= International Prize for Arabic Fiction =

- Awarded for: Best novel published in Arabic
- Location: Arab world
- First award: 2008
- Currently held by: Basem Khandakji
- Website: http://www.arabicfiction.org

The International Prize for Arabic Fiction (IPAF) (Arabic: الجائزة العالمية للرواية العربية), also known as "the Arabic Booker", is regarded as the most prestigious and important literary prize in the Arab world.

Its aim is to reward excellence in contemporary Arabic creative writing and to encourage the readership of high-quality Arabic literature internationally through the translation and publication of winning and shortlisted novels in other major languages. In addition to the prize itself, IPAF supports other literary initiatives. In 2009, IPAF launched its inaugural nadwa (writers' workshop) for emerging writers of fiction in Arabic.

The prize is administered by the Booker Prize Foundation in London, and is currently funded by Department of Culture and Tourism, Abu Dhabi (DCT).

Each year, the winner of the prize receives US$50,000, and the six shortlisted authors receive US$10,000 each.

== Notable trustees ==
- Yasir Suleiman CBE, Professor of Arabic, University of Cambridge, Chair of Trustees
- Evelyn Smith, Booker Prize Foundation, Company Secretary
- Isobel Abulhoul OBE, CEO, Emirates Literature Foundation
- Yassin Adnan, Moroccan journalist, broadcaster and writer
- Nujoom Alghanem, poet, script writer and a multi-award-winning Emirati filmmaker
- Rasheed El-Enany, Egyptian literary scholar, Professor Emeritus of the University of Exeter
- Omar Ghobash, Emirati author, businessman, and diplomat
- Zaki Nusseibeh, UAE Minister of State
- Ahdaf Soueif, Egyptian author and political and cultural commentator
- Jonathan Taylor, former chair of the Booker Prize Foundation

== Winners and nominees ==
= winner

Winner and nominees
Year	Status	Author	Title	Country	Publisher
2008	Winner	Bahaa Taher	Sunset Oasis	Egypt	na
2008	Shortlist	Jabbour Douaihy	June's Rain	Lebanon	Dar An Nahar, Beirut
2008	Shortlist	Elias Farkouh	The Land of Purgatory	Jordan	na
2008	Shortlist	Khaled Khalifa	In Praise of Hatred	Syria	Amisa, Damascus
2008	Shortlist	May Menassa	Walking in the Dust	Lebanon	na
2008	Shortlist	Mekkaoui Said	Swan Song	Egypt	na
2009	Winner	Youssef Ziedan	Azazeel	Egypt	na
2009	Shortlist	Inaam Kachachi	The American Granddaughter	Iraq	Dar Al-Jadid, Beirut
2009	Shortlist	Mohamed El-Bisatie	Hunger	Egypt	Dar Al-Adab, Beirut
2009	Shortlist	Habib Selmi	The Scents of Marie-Claire	Tunisia	Dar Al-Adab, Beirut
2009	Shortlist	Ibrahim Nasrallah	Time of White Horses	Palestine/Jordan	Arab Scientific Publishers, Beirut and Algiers
2009	Shortlist	Fawaz Haddad	The Unfaithful Translator	Syria	na
2009	Longlist	Ezzedine Choukri Fishere	Intensive Care	Egypt	na
2009	Longlist	Abdelkarim Jouaiti	Platoon of Rain	Morocco	na
2009	Longlist	Ali al-Muqri	Black Taste, Black Odour	Yemen	Dar Al-Saqi, Beirut
2009	Longlist	Ali Bader	The Tobacco Guard	Iraq	na
2009	Longlist	Ibrahim al-Koni	The Tumour	Libya	Arab Instt. for Publishing and Studies, Beirut
2009	Longlist	Muhammed Abu Maatouk	The Bottle and the Genie	Syria	Al Kawkab, Beirut
2009	Longlist	Renée Hayek	Prayer for the Family	Lebanon	na
2009	Longlist	Bensalem Himmich	The Man from Andalucia	Morocco	Dar Al-Adab, Beirut
2009	Longlist	Yahya Yakhlif	Ma' Al Sama'	Palestine	Dar al Shorouk, Amman
2009	Longlist	Rabee Jaber	The Confessions	Lebanon	na
2010	Winner	Abdo Khal	Throwing Sparks	Saudi Arabia	na
2010	Shortlist	Rabai al-Madhoun	The Lady from Tel Aviv	Palestine	Arab Institute for Research and Publishing, Beirut
2010	Shortlist	Mansoura Ez Eldin	Beyond Paradise	Egypt	na
2010	Shortlist	Rabee Jaber	America	Lebanon	Arab Cultural Centre, Morocco and Lebanon
2010	Shortlist	Mohamed Mansi Qandil	A Cloudy Day on the West Side	Egypt	Dar El-Shorouk, Cairo
2010	Shortlist	Jamal Naji	When the Wolves Grow Old	Jordan	Ministry of Culture Publications, Amman
2010	Longlist	Omaima Abdullah Al-Khamis	The Leafy Tree	Saudi Arabia	Dar Al-Mada, Damascus
2010	Longlist	Ali Bader	Kings of the Sands	Iraq	Kaleem Publishing, Abu Dhabi
2010	Longlist	Muhsin Al-Ramli	Fingers of Dates	Iraq	Arab Scientific Publishers, Beirut
2010	Longlist	Abdullah Bin Bakheet	Street of Affections	Saudi Arabia	Dar Al-Saqi, Beirut
2010	Longlist	Samir Kacimi	A Great Day to Die	Algeria	Al-Ikhtilaf, Algeria
2010	Longlist	Alawiya Sobh	It's Called Love	Lebanon	na
2010	Longlist	Hassan Daoud	180 Sunsets	Lebanon	Dar Al-Saqi, Beirut
2010	Longlist	Rosa Yaseen Hasan	The Guards of the Air	Syria	Al-Kawkab, Beirut
2010	Longlist	Mahmoud al-Rimawy	Who Will Cheer up the Lady?	Palestine	na
2010	Longlist	Sahar Khalifeh	Origin and Branch	Palestine	na
2011	Winner	Mohammed Achaari	The Arch and the Butterfly	Morocco	na
2011	Winner	Raja'a Alem	The Dove's Necklace	Saudi Arabia	na
2011	Shortlist	Bensalem Himmich	My Tormentor	Morocco	na
2011	Shortlist	Miral al-Tahawy	Brooklyn Heights	Egypt	na
2011	Shortlist	Amir Tag Elsir	The Hunter of the Chrysalises	Sudan	Thaqafa I-al-Nashr - Cultural Publications
2011	Shortlist	Khaled al-Berry	An Oriental Dance	Egypt	na
2011	Longlist	Renée Hayek	A Short Life	Lebanon	na
2011	Longlist	Fatin al-Murr	Common Sins	Lebanon	na
2011	Longlist	Ibtisam Ibrahim Teresa	The Eye of the Sun	Syria	na
2011	Longlist	Khairy Shalaby	Istasia	Egypt	na
2011	Longlist	Maha Hassan	Umbilical Cord	Syria	na
2011	Longlist	Maqbul Moussa al-Alawi	Turmoil in Jeddah	Saudi Arabia	na
2011	Longlist	Razan Naim al-Maghrabi	Women of Wind	Libya	na
2011	Longlist	Waciny Laredj	The Andalucian House	Algeria	na
2011	Longlist	Fawaz Haddad	God's Soldiers	Syria	na
2011	Longlist	Ali al-Muqri	The Handsome Jew	Yemen	na
2012	Winner	Rabee Jaber	The Druze of Belgrade	Lebanon	na
2012	Shortlist	Jabbour Douaihy	The Vagrant	Lebanon	na
2012	Shortlist	Ezzedine Choukri Fishere	Embrace on Brooklyn Bridge	Egypt	na
2012	Shortlist	Nasr Iraq	The Unemployed	Egypt	na
2012	Shortlist	Bachir Mufti	Toy of Fire	Algeria	na
2012	Shortlist	Habib Selmi	The Women of al-Basatin	Tunisia	na
2012	Longlist	Fadi Azzam	Sarmada	Syria	na
2012	Longlist	Rashid al-Daif	Paving the Sea	Lebanon	na
2012	Longlist	Sharbel Qatan	Suitcases of Memory	Lebanon	na
2012	Longlist	Hawra al-Nadawi	Under the Copenhagen Sky	Iraq	na
2012	Longlist	Youssef Ziedan	The Nabatean	Egypt	na
2012	Longlist	Mohamed al-Refai	Nocturnal Creatures of Sadness	Egypt	na
2012	Longlist	Ibrahim al-Zaarur	The Amazing Journey of Khair al-Din ibn Zard	Palestine	na
2013	Winner	Saud Alsanousi	The Bamboo Stalk	Kuwait	Arab Scientific Publishers
2013	Shortlist	Sinan Antoon	Ave Maria	Iraq	Al-Jamal
2013	Shortlist	Jana Elhassan	I, She and Other Women	Lebanon	Arab Scientific Publishers
2013	Shortlist	Mohammed Hassan Alwan	The Beaver	Saudi Arabia	Dar al-Saqi
2013	Shortlist	Ibrahim Issa	Our Master	Egypt	Bloomsbury Qatar Foundation
2013	Shortlist	Hussein Al-Wad	His Excellency the Minister	Tunisia	Dar al-Janub
2013	Longlist	Ashraf El-Ashmawi	Toya	Egypt	Al-Dar al-Masriya al-Lubnaniya
2013	Longlist	Hoda Barakat	The Kingdom of this Earth	Lebanon	Dar al-Adab
2013	Longlist	Anwar Hamed	Jaffa Prepares Morning Coffee	Palestine	Arab Instt. for Research and Publishing
2013	Longlist	Rabee Jaber	The Birds of the Holiday Inn	Lebanon	Dar al-Tanwir
2013	Longlist	Elias Khoury	Sinalkul	Lebanon	Dar al-Adab
2013	Longlist	Waciny Laredj	Lolita's Fingers	Algeria	Dar al-Adab
2013	Longlist	Mohammed Abdel Nabi	The Return of the Sheikh	Egypt	Rawafid
2013	Longlist	Ibrahim Nasrallah	Lanterns of the King of Galilee	Palestine/Jordan	Arab Scientific Publishers
2013	Longlist	Muhsin al-Ramly	The President's Gardens	Iraq	Thaqafa
2013	Longlist	Amin Zaoui	The Goatherd	Algeria	Al-Ikhtilef
2014	Winner	Ahmed Saadawi	Frankenstein in Baghdad	Iraq	Al-Jamal
2014	Shortlist	Youssef Fadel	A Rare Blue Bird that Flies with Me	Morocco	Dar al-Adab
2014	Shortlist	Inaam Kachachi	Tashari	Iraq	Dar al-Jadid
2014	Shortlist	Khaled Khalifa	No Knives in this City's Kitchens	Syria	Dar al-Ain
2014	Shortlist	Abdelrahim Lahbibi	The Journeys of 'Abdi	Morocco	Africa East
2014	Shortlist	Ahmed Mourad	The Blue Elephant	Egypt	Dar al-Shorouq
2014	Longlist	Ibrahim Abdel Meguid	Clouds Over Alexandria	Egypt	Dar al-Shorouq
2014	Longlist	Badryah El-Bishr	Love Stories on al-Asha Street	Saudi Arabia	Dar al-Saqi
2014	Longlist	Antoine Douaihy	The Bearer of the Purple Rose	Lebanon	Arab Scientific Publishers
2014	Longlist	Amir Tag Elsir	366	Sudan	Arab Scientific Publishers
2014	Longlist	Ismail Ghazali	The Season of Pike Fishing	Morocco	Dar al-Ain
2014	Longlist	Ismail Fahd Ismail	The Phoenix and the Faithful Friend	Kuwait	Arab Scientific Publishers
2014	Longlist	Ashraf al-Khamaisi	God's Land of Exile	Egypt	Al-Hadara
2014	Longlist	Waciny Laredj	Ashes of the East: The Wolf who Grew Up in the Wilderness	Algeria	Al-Jamal
2014	Longlist	Ibrahim Nasrallah	The Edge of the Abyss	Palestine/Jordan	Arab Scientific Publishers
2014	Longlist	Abdel Khaliq al-Rikabi	The Sad Night of Ali Baba	Iraq	Arab Institute for Research and Publishing
2015	Winner	Shukri Mabkhout	The Italian	Tunisia	na
2015	Shortlist	Atef Abu Saif	A Suspended Life	Palestine	na
2015	Shortlist	Jana ElHassan	Floor 99	Lebanon	na
2015	Shortlist	Lina Hawyan Elhassan	Diamonds and Women	Syria	na
2015	Shortlist	Hammour Ziada	The Longing of the Dervish	Sudan	na
2015	Shortlist	Ahmed el-Madini	Willow Alley	Morocco	na
2015	Longlist	Antoine Douaihy	Drowning in Lake Morez	Lebanon	na
2015	Longlist	Ashraf al-Khamaisi	Sharp Turning	Egypt	na
2015	Longlist	Mohammed Berrada	Far from Clamour, Close to Silence	Morocco	na
2015	Longlist	Hadia Hussein	Riyam and Kafa	Iraq	na
2015	Longlist	Abdel Wahab al-Hamadi	Don't Tell Your Nightmare!	Kuwait	na
2015	Longlist	Hisham al-Khashin	Graphite	Egypt	na
2015	Longlist	Habib Abdulrab Sarori	The Daughter of Suslov	Yemen	na
2015	Longlist	Muna al-Sheemi	The Size of a Grape	Egypt	na
2015	Longlist	Jabbour Douaihy	The American Neighbourhood	Lebanon	na
2015	Longlist	Maha Hassan	Female Voices	Syria	na
2016	Winner	Rabai al-Madhoun	Destinies: Concerto of the Holocaust and the Nakba	Palestine	na
2016	Shortlist	Mohamed Rabie	Mercury	Egypt	na
2016	Shortlist	Shahla Ujayli	A Sky Close to Our House	Syria	na
2016	Shortlist	Tareq Bakari	Numedia	Morocco	na
2016	Shortlist	Mahmoud Shukair	Praise for the Women of the Family	Palestine	na
2016	Shortlist	George Yaraq	The Guard of the Dead	Lebanon	na
2016	Longlist	Taleb Alrefai	Here	Kuwait	na
2016	Longlist	Laila al-Atrash	Hymns of Temptation	Palestine	na
2016	Longlist	Ibrahim Farghali	The Temple of Silken Fingers	Egypt	na
2016	Longlist	Janan Jasim Halawi	People of the Palms	Iraq	na
2016	Longlist	Mahmoud Hasan al-Jasim	Mariam's Journey	Syria	na
2016	Longlist	Hazim Kamaledin	Desertified Waters	Iraq	na
2016	Longlist	Abdennour Mezzine	Letters of the Storm	Morocco	na
2016	Longlist	Ahmed Muhsin	Warsaw a Little While Ago	Lebanon	na
2016	Longlist	Hamed al-Nazir	The Prophecy of Saqqa	Sudan	na
2016	Longlist	Mohamed Mansi Qandil	The Black Brigade	Egypt	na
2017	Winner	Mohammed Hasan Alwan	A Small Death	Saudi Arabia	na
2017	Shortlist	Najwa Binshatwan	The Slave Pens	Libya	na
2017	Shortlist	Ismail Fahd Ismail	Al-Sabiliat	Kuwait	na
2017	Shortlist	Elias Khoury	Children of the Ghetto	Lebanon	na
2017	Shortlist	Mohammed Abdel Nabi	In the Spider's Room	Egypt	na
2017	Shortlist	Saad Mohammed Raheem	The Bookseller's Murder	Iraq	na
2017	Longlist	Yassin Adnan	Hot Maroc	Morocco	na
2017	Longlist	Sultan Al Ameemi	One Room Is Not Enough	United Arab Emirates	na
2017	Longlist	Amir Tag Elsir	The Witches' Resort	Sudan	na
2017	Longlist	Sinan Antoon	Index	Iraq	na
2017	Longlist	Ali Ghadeer	Swastika	Iraq	na
2017	Longlist	Zuheir al-Hiti	Days of Dust	Iraq	na
2017	Longlist	Abdelkarim Jouaiti	The North Africans	Morocco	na
2017	Longlist	Taissier Khalaf	The Slaughter of the Philosophers	Syria	na
2017	Longlist	Youssef Rakha	Paolo	Egypt	na
2017	Longlist	Renée Hayek	The Year of the Radio	Lebanon	na
2018	Winner	Ibrahim Nasrallah	The Second War of the Dog	Palestine/Jordan	Arab Scientific Publishers
2018	Shortlist	Dima Wannous	The Frightened Ones	Syria	Dar al-Adab
2018	Shortlist	Aziz Mohammed	The Critical Case of K	Saudi Arabia	Dar Tanweer, Lebanon
2018	Shortlist	Shahad Al Rawi	The Baghdad Clock	Iraq	Dar al-Hikma, London
2018	Shortlist	Walid Shurafa	The Heir of the Tombstones	Palestine	Al Ahlia
2018	Shortlist	Amir Tag Elsir	Flowers in Flames	Sudan	Dar Al Saqi
2018	Longlist	Antoine Douaihy	The Last Country	Lebanon	Arab Scientific Publishers
2018	Longlist	Ahmad Abdulatif	The Earthen Fortress	Egypt	Dar al-Ain
2018	Longlist	Hamed al-Nazir	The Black Peacock	Sudan	Medad
2018	Longlist	Rasha Adly	Passion	Egypt	Arab Scientific Publishers
2018	Longlist	Amin Zaoui	Leg Over Leg - in the Sighting of the Lovers' Crescent	Algeria	Al-Ikhtilef
2018	Longlist	Fadi Azzam	Huddud's House	Syria	Dar al-Adab
2018	Longlist	Amjad Nasser	Here is the Rose	Jordan	Dar al-Adab
2018	Longlist	Atef Abu Saif	Christina	Palestine	Al Ahlia
2018	Longlist	Hussein Yassin	Ali, the Story of an Honourable Man	Palestine	Dar al-Ru'aat
2018	Longlist	Taleb al-Refai	Al-Najdi	Kuwait	That al-Salasil
2019	Winner	Hoda Barakat	The Night Mail	Lebanon	Dar al-Adab
2019	Shortlist	Adel Esmat	The Commandments	Egypt	Kotob Khan
2019	Shortlist	Inaam Kachachi	The Outcast	Iraq	Dar al-Jadid
2019	Shortlist	Mohammed Al-Maazuz	What Sin Caused Her to Die?	Morocco	Cultural Book Center
2019	Shortlist	Shahla Ujayli	Summer with the Enemy	Syria	Difaf Publishing
2019	Shortlist	Kafa Al-Zou'bi	Cold White Sun	Jordan	Dar al-Adab
2019	Longlist	Mohammed Abi Samra	Women Without Trace	Lebanon	Riyad al-Rayyes
2019	Longlist	Jalal Barjas	Women of the Five Senses	Jordan	Arabic Institute for Research and Publishing
2019	Longlist	Mbarek Rabi	Western Mediterranean	Morocco	Arabic Institute for Research and Publishing
2019	Longlist	Omaima Abdullah Al-Khamis	Voyage of the Cranes in the Cities of Agate	Saudi Arabia	Dar Al Saqi
2019	Longlist	Iman Yehia	The Mexican Wife	Egypt	Dar al-Shorouk
2019	Longlist	Maysalun Hadi	Mohammed's Brothers	Iraq	Dar al-Dhakira
2019	Longlist	Habib Sayah	Me and Haim	Algeria	Dar Mim
2019	Longlist	May Menassa	I Killed My Mother in Order to Live	Lebanon	Riyad al-Rayyes
2019	Longlist	Haji Jaber	Black Foam	Eritrea	Dar Tanweer (Lebanon)
2019	Longlist	Waciny Laredj	May — the Nights of Isis Copia	Algeria	Dar al-Adab
2020	Winner	Abdelouahab Aissaoui	The Spartan Court	Algeria	Dar Min
2020	Shortlist	Alia Mamdouh	The Tank	Iraq	Al-Mutawassit
2020	Shortlist	Khalil Alrez	The Russian Quarter	Syria	Difaf Publishing
2020	Shortlist	Jabbour Douaihy	The King of India	Lebanon	Dar Al Saqi
2020	Shortlist	Said Khatibi	Firewood of Sarajevo	Algeria	Al-Ikhtilef
2020	Shortlist	Youssef Ziedan	Fardeqan – the Detention of the Great Sheikh	Egypt	Dar al-Shorouk
2020	Longlist	Salim Barakat	What About Rachel, the Jewish Lady?	Syria	Arabic Institute for Research and Publishing
2020	Longlist	Aisha Ibrahim	The War of the Gazelle	Libya	Tripoli Scientific Bookshop
2020	Longlist	Samir Kacimi	The Stairs of Trolar	Algeria	Editions Barzakh
2020	Longlist	Bachir Mefti	The Mingling of the Seasons	Algeria	Al-Ikhtilef
2020	Longlist	Rasha Adly	The Last Days of the Pasha	Egypt	Arab Scientific Publishers
2020	Longlist	Azher Jerjis	Sleeping in the Cherry Field	Iraq	Dar al-Rafidain
2020	Longlist	Magbool Al-Alawi	Seferberlik	Saudi Arabia	Dar Al Saqi
2020	Longlist	Khaled Khalifa	No One Prayed Over Their Graves	Syria	Hachette Antoine/Naufal
2020	Longlist	Mohammed Eissa al-Mu'adab	Hammam Dhahab	Tunisia	Mesaa
2020	Longlist	Hassan Aourid	Al-Mutanabbi's Rabat	Morocco	Al-Markez al-Thaqafi al-Arabia
2021	Winner	Jalal Barjas	Notebooks of the Bookseller	Jordan	The Arabic Institute for Research and Publishing
2021	Shortlist	Abdulatif Ould Abdullah	The Eye of Hammurabi	Algeria	Dar Mim
2021	Shortlist	Amira Ghenim	Calamity of the Nobility	Tunisia	Dar Mesaa
2021	Shortlist	Dunya Mikhail	The Bird Tattoo	Iraq	Dar al-Rafidain
2021	Shortlist	Habib Selmi	Longing for the Woman Next Door	Tunisia	Dar al-Adab
2021	Shortlist	Abdelmajid Sebbata	File 42	Morocco	Al-Markez al-Thaqafi al-Arabi
2021	Longlist	Youssef Fadel	The Life of Butterflies	Morocco	Al-Mutawassit
2021	Longlist	Abdullah Al-Eyaf	Hole to Heaven	Saudi Arabia	Dar Rashm
2021	Longlist	Sara al-Nams	J	Algeria	Dar al-Adab
2021	Longlist	Abbas Baydoun	Boxes of Desire	Lebanon	Dar al-Ain
2021	Longlist	Hamed al-Nazir	Two Green Eyes	Sudan	Dar Tanweer - Lebanon
2021	Longlist	Amara Lakhous	The Night Bird	Algeria	Manshurat al-Hibr
2021	Longlist	Abdullah Albsais	M for Murderer: S for Sa'id	Kuwait	Riwayat
2021	Longlist	Ahmed Zein	Fruit for the Crows	Yemen	Al-Mutawassit
2021	Longlist	Muhsin Al-Ramli	Daughter of the Tigris	Iraq	Dar al-Mada
2021	Longlist	Mansoura Ez Eldin	The Orchards of Basra	Egypt	Dar al-Shorouk
2022	Winner	Mohamed Alnaas	Bread on Uncle Milad's Table	Libya	Rashm
2022	Shortlist	Khalid Al-Nasrallah	The White Line of Night	Kuwait	Dar Al Saqi
2022	Shortlist	Mohsine Loukili	The Prisoner of the Portuguese	Morocco	Dar Mim
2022	Shortlist	Reem al-Kamali	Rose's Diary	UAE	Dar al-Adab
2022	Shortlist	Bushra Khalfan	Dilshad	Oman	Takween
2022	Shortlist	Tarek Emam	Cairo Maquette	Egypt	Al-Mutawassit
2022	Longlist	Dima Al Shukr	Where Is My Name?	Syria	Dar Al Adab
2022	Longlist	Yaa'rab al-Eissa	The White Minaret	Syria	Al-Mutawassit
2022	Longlist	Mohamed Tawfik	The Whisper of the Scorpion	Egypt	Dar al-Ain
2022	Longlist	Mona al-Shammari	The Maids of the Shrine	Kuwait	Dar Al Saqi
2022	Longlist	Rouchdi Redouane	The Hungarian	Algeria	Dar al-Adab
2022	Longlist	Boumediene Belkebir	The Alley of the Italians	Algeria	Al-Ikhtilef
2022	Longlist	Haji Jabir	The Abyssinian Rimbaud	Eritrea	Takween
2022	Longlist	Belal Fadl	Mother of Mimi	Egypt	Dar al-Mada
2022	Longlist	Nizar Aghri	In Search of Azar	Syria	Al Kotob Khan
2022	Longlist	Ezzedine Choukri Fishere	Farah's Story	Egypt	Dar al-Shorouk
2023	Winner	Zahran Alqasmi	The Exile of the Water Diviner	Oman	Rashm
2023	Shortlist	Fatima Abdulhamid	The Highest Part of the Horizon	Saudi Arabia	Masciliana
2023	Shortlist	Al-Sadiq Haj Ahmed	Drought	Algeria	Dar Dwaya
2023	Shortlist	Najwa Binshatwan	Concerto Qurina Eduardo	Libya	Takween - Iraq
2023	Shortlist	Azher Jirjees	The Stone of Happiness	Iraq	Dar Al-Rafidain - Lebanon
2023	Shortlist	Miral al-Tahawy	Days of the Shining Sun	Egypt	Dar al-Ain
2023	Longlist	Ahmad Abdulatif	The Ages of Daniel in the City of Threads	Egypt	Dar al-Ain
2023	Longlist	Lina Huyan Elhassan	The Ruler of the Two Fortresses	Syria	Dar al-Adab
2023	Longlist	Ahmed El-Fakharany	Bar Lialina	Egypt	Dar al-Shorouk
2023	Longlist	Mohammed Harradi	The Melody of the Rabbit	Morocco	Al-Mutawassit
2023	Longlist	Sausan Jamil Hasan	My Name Is Zayzafoune	Syria	Al-Rabie
2023	Longlist	Aisha Ibrahim	The Box of Sand	Libya	Al-Mutawassit
2023	Longlist	Nasser Iraq	The Antikkhana	Egypt	Dar al-Shorouk
2023	Longlist	Rabia Raihane	The Family House	Morocco	Dar al-Ain
2023	Longlist	Qassem Tawfik	One Night is Enough	Jordan	Al Aan
2023	Longlist	May Telmissany	They All Say I Love You	Egypt	Dar al-Shorouk
2024	Winner	Basim Khandaqji	A Mask, the Color of the Sky	Palestine	Dar al-Adab
2024	Shortlist	Rima Bali	Suleima’s Ring	Syria	Tanmia Publishing
2024	Shortlist	Osama Al-Eissa	The Seventh Heaven of Jerusalem	Palestine	Al Mutawassit
2024	Shortlist	Raja Alem	Bahbel: Makkah Multiverse 1945-2009	Saudi Arabia	Dar Tanweer
2024	Shortlist	Ahmed Al-Morsi	Gambling on the Honor of Lady Mitsy	Egypt	Dar Dawen
2024	Shortlist	Eissa Nasiri	The Mosaicist	Morocco	Masciliana
2024	Longlist	Mohammed Abdel Nabi	Nearly Every Day	Egypt	Markez al-Mahrusa
2024	Longlist	Badriya Albadri	Foumbi	Oman	Dar Al Saqi
2024	Longlist	Sara Alsarraf	I Heard Everything	Iraq	Dar al-Hikma
2024	Longlist	Rashid al-Daif	The Other Face of the Shadow	Lebanon	Dar Al Saqi
2024	Longlist	Dorra al-Fazi'	I Hide Passion	Tunisia	Sindbad
2024	Longlist	Saleh al-Hamad	Eye of the Kite	Saudi Arabia	Dar Rashm
2024	Longlist	Ahmed Menour	Storm Over the Islands	Algeria	Dar al-Tanweer Algeria
2024	Longlist	Salha Obeid	Spice Circle	UAE	Al-Mutawassit
2024	Longlist	Sufyan Rajab	Reader of the Tanners' Alley	Tunisia	Masciliana
2024	Longlist	Amin Zaoui	The Idols	Algeria	Daliman
2025	Winner	Mohamed Samir Nada	The Prayer of Anxiety	Egypt	Masciliana
2025	Shortlist	Taissier Khalaf	The Andalusian Messiah	Palestine - Syria	Al Mutawassit
2025	Shortlist	Ahmed Vall Ould Dine	Danishmand	Mauritania	Masciliana
2025	Shortlist	Nadia Najar	The Touch of Light	UAE	Al Mutawassit
2025	Shortlist	Azher Jirjees	The Valley of the Butterflies	Iraq	Dar al-Rafidain
2025	Shortlist	Haneen Al-Sayegh	The Women’s Covenant	Lebanon	Dar Al-Adab
2025	Longlist	Jan Dost	The French Prisoner	Syria	Dar Al Saqi
2025	Longlist	Ahmed Al-Malawany	Happy Dreams	Egypt	Kotopia
2025	Longlist	Sausan Jamil Hasan	Heiress of the Keys	Syria	Al-Rabie Publications
2025	Longlist	Inam Bioud	Houwariya	Algeria	Dar Mim
2025	Longlist	Ayman Ragab Taher	The Lamplighter	Egypt	Kayyan
2025	Longlist	Sumar Shihada	My Life Has Just Begun	Syria	Dar al-Karma
2025	Longlist	Iman Humaydan	Songs for the Darkness	Lebanon	Dar Al Saqi
2025	Longlist	Hasan Kamal	The Stolen Novel	Egypt	Diwan
2025	Longlist	Aqeel Almusawi	The Weepers	Kuwait	Takween
2025	Longlist	Rashid al-Daif	What Zeina Saw and What She Didn’t	Lebanon	Dar Al Saqi
2026	Winner	Said Khatibi	Swimming Against the Tide	Algeria	Hachette Antoine
2026	Shortlist	Ahmad Abdulatif	The Origin of Species	Egypt	Hayat Publications
2026	Shortlist	Najwa Barakat	The Absence of Mai	Lebanon	Dar al-Adab
2026	Shortlist	Doaa Ibrahim	A Cloud Above My Head	Egypt	Dar al-Ain
2026	Shortlist	Diaa Jubaili	The Seer	Iraq	Dar Rashm
2026	Shortlist	Amin Zaoui	Siesta Dream	Algeria	Dar al-Ain
2026	Longlist	Omaima Al-Khamis	The Al Musharaq Family’s Aunt	Saudi Arabia	Dar Al Saqi
2026	Longlist	Abdelouahab Aissaoui	Grandma Touma's Cord	Algeria	Tashkeel
2026	Longlist	Nizar Chakroun	Days of the Murdered Fatimid	Tunisia	Dar Safsafa
2026	Longlist	Marwan Al-Ghafouri	Five Houses for God and a Room for My Grandmother	Yemen	Dar Al Saqi
2026	Longlist	Abdelsalem Ibrahim	The Solitude of the Kangaroo	Egypt	Tanmia
2026	Longlist	Abdelmajid Sebbata	In the Labyrinths of Mr. F N	Morocco	Al-Markez al-Thaqafi al-Arabi
2026	Longlist	Khalil Sweileh	Water of the Bride	Syria	All Prints
2026	Longlist	Sherifa Al-Toubi	The Flag: The Blowing of the Wind	Oman	Alaan Publishing
2026	Longlist	Abdo Wazen	Life Is Not a Novel	Lebanon	Al-Mutawassit
2026	Longlist	Essam El Zayaat	Hiding in a Hamster Wheel	Egypt	Dar Dawen

=== 2008 ===
The winner was announced on 10 March 2008. The shortlist was announced on 29 January 2008, chosen from 131 entries.

=== 2009 ===
The winner was announced on 16 March 2009. The shortlist was announced on 10 December 2008. The longlist was announced on 11 November 2008, chosen from 121 entries.

=== 2010 ===
The winner was announced on 2 March 2010. The shortlist was announced on 15 December 2009. The longlist was announced on 17 November 2009, chosen from 115entries.

=== 2011 ===
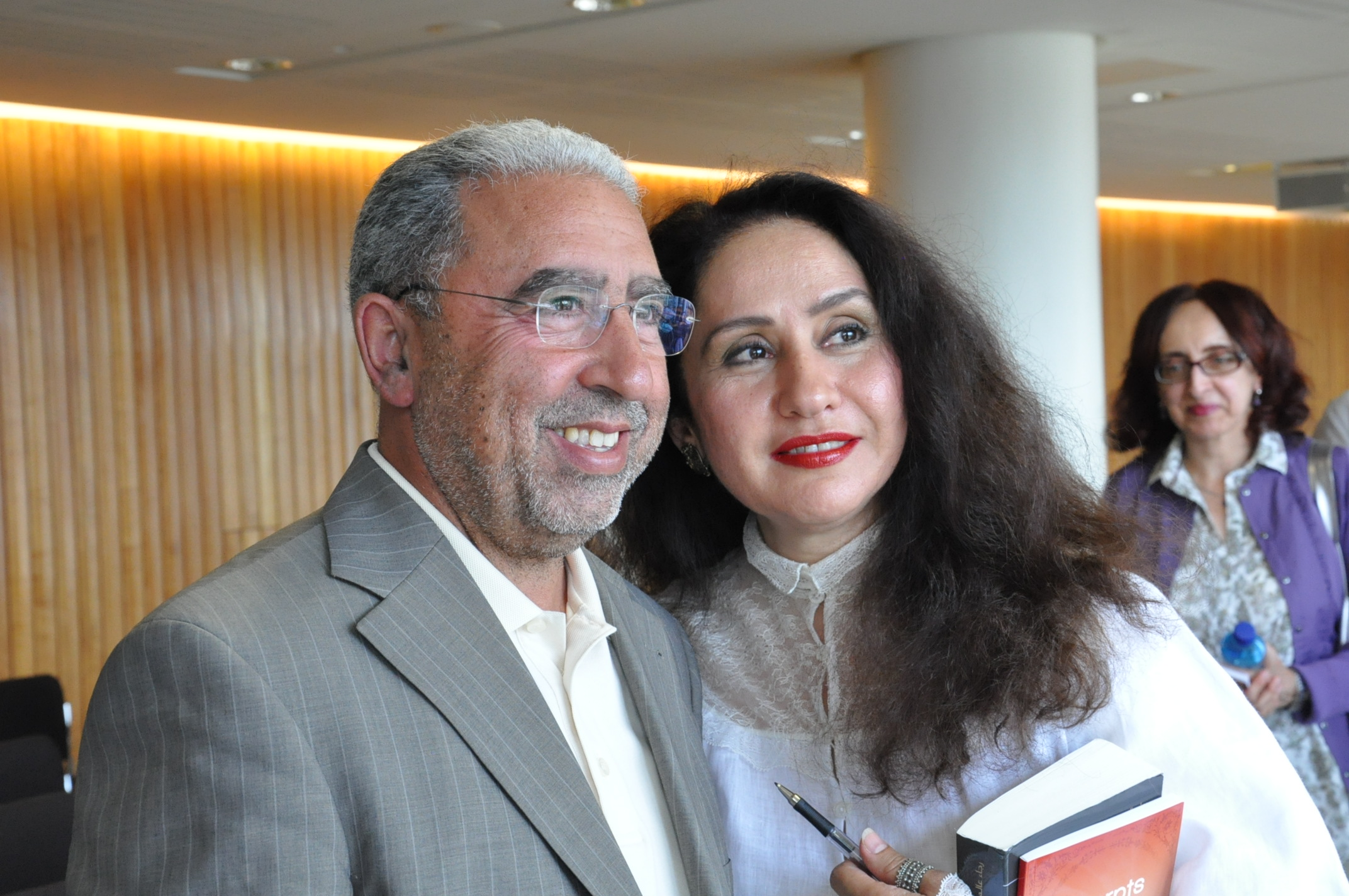
Mohammed Achaari & Raja'a Alem, joint winners of the 2011 prize

The shortlist was announced 9 December 2010, chosen from a total of 123 submissions and a longlist of 16. The winners were announced on 14 March 2011, the eve of the Abu Dhabi International Book Fair. This marked the first time the award had been split, as well as the first female winner (Raja'a Alem).

=== 2012 ===
A total of 101 submissions from 15 countries were whittled down to a longlist of 13. This list was announced in November 2011. The final shortlist of six books was revealed on 11 January 2012. The winner was announced 27 March 2012.

=== 2013 ===
The longlist of 16 books was announced on 6 December 2012. The shortlist of six books was announced on 9 January 2013. The winner was announced on 23 April 2013.

=== 2014 ===
The longlist of 16 books was announced 7 January 2014. The shortlist of 6 books was announced 10 February 2014. The winner was announced 29 April 2014.

=== 2015 ===
On 13 February 2015 the shortlist was announced. The winner was announced 6 May 2015.

=== 2016 ===
The longlist was announced on 12 January 2016. The winner was announced 26 April 2016.

=== 2017 ===
The winner was announced 25 April 2017.

=== 2018 ===
The longlist was announced on 17 January 2018. The winner was announced 24 April 2018.

=== 2019 ===
The shortlist was announced on 5 February 2019, chosen from a total of 134 submissions from 9 Arab countries. The shortlist titles

=== 2020 ===
The winner was announced on 14 April 2020. The shortlist was announced on 4 February 2020. The longlist was announced on 17 December 2019, chosen from 128 entries.

=== 2021 ===
The longlist was chosen on 1 March 2021, chosen from 121 entries. The shortlist was announced on 29 March 2021 and the winner on 25 May 2021.

=== 2025 ===
The winner was announced on March the 24th 2025.

== Judges ==
The judges since 2008 are listed below:

=== 2008 ===
- Feissal Darraj
- Ghalia Qabbani
- Mohammed Bennis
- Mohammed Berrada
- Paul Starkey
- Samuel Shimon

=== 2009 ===
- Fakhri Saleh
- Hartmut Faehndrich
- Mohammad al-Murr
- Rasheed El-Enany
- Youmna el Eid

=== 2010 ===
- Taleb Alrefai
- Raja' Ben Salamah
- Saif al-Rahbi
- Frédéric LaGrange

=== 2011 ===
- Fadhil al-Azzawi
- Munira Al-Fadhel
- Isabella Camera D'Afflitto
- Amjad Nasser
- Said Yaktine

=== 2012 ===
- Georges Tarabichi
- Maudie Bitar
- Hoda Elsadda
- Huda al-Naimi
- Gonzalo Fernández Parrilla

=== 2013 ===
- Galal Amin
- Sobhi al-Boustan
- Ali Ferzat
- Barbara Michalak-Pikulska
- Zahia Smail Salhi

=== 2014 ===
- Saad A. Albazei (Chair)
- Ahmed Alfaitouri
- Zhor Gourram
- Abdullah Ibrahim
- Mehmet Hakki Suçin

=== 2015 ===
- Mourid Barghouti (Chair)
- Ayman A. El-Desouky
- Parween Habib
- Najim A. Kadhim
- Kaoru Yamamoto

=== 2019 ===
- Chair: Charafdin Majdolin, Moroccan critic and academic
- Fowziya Abu Khalid, Saudi Arabian poet, writer, academic and researcher i social and political issues
- Zulaikha Aburisha, Jordanian poet and activist
- Latif Zeitouni, Lebanese academic and literary critic
- Zhang Hong Yi, Chinese translator and researcher

=== 2020 ===
- Chair: Muhsin al-Musawi, an Iraqi literary critic and Professor of Classical and Modern Arabic Literature, Comparative and Cultural Studies at Columbia University
- Pierre Abi Saab, a Lebanese critic, journalist and co-founder of the Lebanese Al-Akhbar newspaper
- Reem Magued, an Eqyptian broadcaster, television journalist and trainer in journalism and media
- Amin Zaoui, an Algerian novelist who writes in both Arabic and French, and Professor of Comparative Literature and Contemporary Thought at the Central University of Algiers
- Viktoria Zarytovskaya, a Russian academic, researcher and translator of numerous works of Arabic literature into Russian including Ahmed Saadawi's Frankenstein in Baghdad, winner of the prize in 2014

=== 2021 ===
- Chair: Chawki Bazih, Lebanese poet and author
- Mohammed Ait Hanna, a Moroccan writer, translator and lecturer of Philosophy at the Regional Centre for Teaching Careers and Training in Casablanca
- Safa Jubran, a lecturer of Arabic Language and Modern Literature at the University of San Paolo in Brazil
- Ali Al-Muqri, a Yemeni writer twice longlisted for IPAF in 2009 and 2011 respectively
- Ayesha Sultan, an Emirati author, journalist, founding director of Warrak Publishing House and Vice President of the Emirates Writers Union

=== 2022 ===
- Shukri Mabkhout
- Ashur Etwebi
- Iman Humaydan
- Saadiah Mufarreh
- Baian Rayhanova

=== 2025 ===
- Mona Baker
- Said Bengrad
- Maryam Al-Hashimi
- Sampsa Peltonen
- Bilal Orfali

== Statistics ==
As of 2020, the following authors have been nominated at least three times:

Three nominations

- Antoine Douaihy
- Inaam Kachachi
- Khaled Khalifa
- Renée Hayek
- Youssef Ziedan

Four nominations

- Amir Tag Elsir
- Ibrahim Nasrallah
- Jabbour Douaihy
- Rabee Jaber
- Waciny Laredj

Countries

The countries with the most nominations are:

- Egypt, 34
- Lebanon, 30
- Iraq, 22
- Syria, 20

Sudan, Eritrea and the UAE have one nomination each.

== IPAF Nadwa ==
- For details of the annual writers' workshop, see International Prize for Arabic Fiction Nadwa.
