= Khaled al-Berry =

Egyptian writer (born 1972)

Khaled al-Berry (born June 27, 1972) is an Egyptian writer and journalist.

Al-Berry received a degree in medicine from Cairo University and moved to London in 1999.

Al-Berry is best known for his autobiography Life is More Beautiful than Paradise: A Jihadist's Own Story, which stemmed from his experience with an Islamic Group student group during his adolescence. Former BBC news host Liliane Daoud, then a student of sociology at Lebanese University, Lebanese University professor Waddah Sharara, and Lebanese editor of An-Nahar Mohammed Abi Samra encouraged him to write the book. The first edition of the book was published in July 2001 as a series of articles posted in the Lebanese newspaper An-Nahar. Two months later, after the September 11 attacks, the novel received worldwide attention, and it new translations were published in French, Italian, Spanish, and Dutch. Publishers continued to reach out about new translations, and eventually the English version was published, translated by Humphrey T. Davies. The novel was published online in 2009 and on paper in 2017 and 2020.

Al-Berry has also written several novels, including Negative, a novel about a masochistic relationship between a dreamer reminiscent of Nasser's regime and a woman who fell for someone who abandoned his patriotism. He struggled with censorship in trying to print the book, and one print shop refused to print because of a sex scene contained within the book. His publisher convinced him privately to bribe the worker in order to print, and Al-Berry paid the worker 20 Egyptian pounds so that the book could be published. He has since expressed hope for a less censored society:

"I'm looking forward to a more transparent society that allows access to information and paves the way to the production of 'more valid' books... In absence of a regime that monopolise[s] 'public services,' I hope we will have a sector of business people who care to build public libraries and to support publishing. That's the real struggle."

Al-Berry's novel An Oriental Dance which was nominated for the Arabic Booker Prize. In 2012, he participated in the International Writing Program's Fall Residency at the University of Iowa in Iowa City, IA.

Al-Berry was married to former BBC host Liliane Daoud for 6 years and had a daughter with her. He witnessed Daoud's deportation under Abdel Fattah el-Sisi in 2016 and posted online about the incident.

== Works ==
- Life Is More Beautiful Than Paradise: A Jihadist's Own Story (2009)
- Negative
- An Oriental Dance (2010)
