= Abdelrahim Lahbibi =

Moroccan novelist (born 1950)

Abdelrahim Lahbibi (Arabic: عبد الرحيم لحبيبي; born 1950) is a Moroccan novelist.

== Early life ==
He was born in Safi and attended university in Fez. He studied Arabic at the College of Arts and Human Sciences, graduating with a BA in 1970.

== Career ==
He has worked as a teacher and educationist ever since. His novel The Journeys of 'Abdi, known as Son of Hamriya (Arabic: تغريبة العبدي, المشهورة أيضا بولد الحمرية) was shortlisted for the 2013 Arabic Booker Prize.

== Novels ==
- Bread, Hashish and Fish (2008)
- The Best of Luck (2010)
- The Journeys of 'Abdi, known as Son of Hamriya (2013)
