= Zahran Alqasmi =

Omani writer (born 1974)

Zahran Alqasmi (born 1974) is an Omani writer. He was born in Dima Wattayeen. He is the author of four novels, ten poetry collections, short stories and non-fiction works. His 2021 novel Exile of the Water Diviner was nominated for the Arabic Booker Prize.

== Works ==
- Mountain of the Horseradish Tree (2013)
- The Sniper (2014)
- Hunger for Honey (2017)
- Exile of the Water Diviner (2021)
- Biography of the Stone 1 (2009)
- Biography of the Stone 2 (2011)
