= Abdullah Albsais =

Kuwaiti poet and novelist (born 1980)

Abdullah Albsais (born 1980) is a Kuwaiti poet and novelist. He studied in Canada and Kuwait.

His books include:

- Al-Diwaniyya (short stories, 2011)
- The Wall (short stories, 2012)
- Ponderings (poetry, 2017)
- Prodigal Memories (sometimes translated as Stray Memories) (novel, 2014)
- The Taste of Guilt (novel, 2016)
- M for Murderer: S for Sa’id (novel, 2019)

His work has been described as combining interest in literature and philosophy with folk stories. During his youth, he participated in poetry competitions.

His 2019 novel M for Murderer: S for Sa'id was longlisted for the Arabic Booker Prize in 2021. He also won an award in 2017 at the Sharjah Book Fair.

His 2014 novel was banned by authorities in Kuwait, particularly the Kuwaiti Ministry of Information, for raising an allegedly "sensitive" topic.
