= Ahmed El-Fakharany =

Egyptian writer

Ahmed El-Fakharany (born 1981) is an Egyptian writer. He was born in Alexandria. He is the author of six novels:

- Mandourla (2013),
- The Story of the Pasha (2016),
- The Family of Jado (2017),
- Souk of the Syrians (2019),
- Taming the Dog (2021) and
- Bar Lialina (2022)

Both Souk of the Syrians and Mandourla have been honoured at the Sawiris Cultural Awards. His latest work Bar Lialina has been nominated for the Arabic Booker Prize.

He has also written a book of short stories, The Kingdom of the Orange Juice (2011), and a book of poetry, Simple Decoration (2017).
