= Amira Ghenim =

Tunisian writer and academic

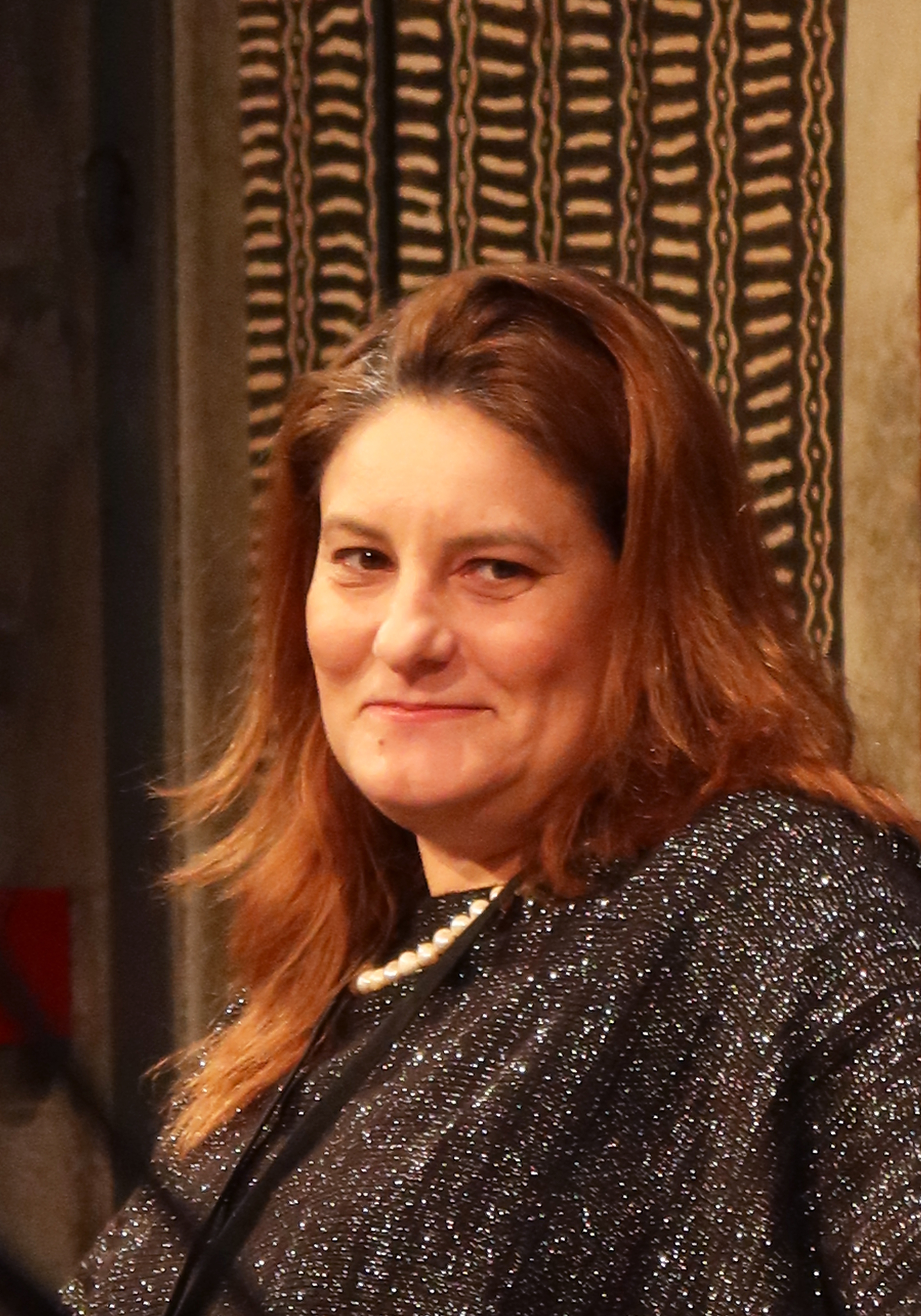
Image of Amira Ghenim

Amira Ghenim is a Tunisian writer and academic. She was born in 1978 in Sousse. She obtained a PhD in linguistics, teaches at Tunis University, and is involved in academic publishing about linguistics and translation both as an editor and a writer. In addition, she has written and published two novels to date:

- The Yellow Dossier (2019), which won the Sheikh Rashid Bin Hamad Prize in 2020
- The Calamity of the Nobility (2020), which was shortlisted for the Arabic Booker Prize in 2021

She is also involved in radio production, and her show "Women of My Country" won an award from the Arab Radios Union in 2014.
