= Mahmoud Hasan al-Jasim =

Syrian writer and academic

Mahmoud Hasan al-Jasim (born 1966) is a Syrian writer and academic. He taught for many years in Aleppo before moving to Qatar University in 2012. He has published three novels: Forgive Me, Mother (2014), Brazen Looks (2015) and Mariam's Journey (2015), the last of which was nominated for the Arabic Booker Prize.
