= Abdelkarim Jouaiti =

- Born: May 13, 1962 (age 63); Beni Mellal
- Occupations: Writer; Novelist; Translator; Civil servant

Abdelkarim Jouaiti (Arabic: عبد الكريم جويطي) (born 1962) is a Moroccan novelist.

== Early life ==
Born in Beni Mellal, he works in the Moroccan civil service and was at one point the Ministry of Culture's regional director in Tadla-Azilal.

== Career ==
He is the author of several novels including:

- Night of the Sun (1992)
- Celebrations of Death (1996)
- Yellow Morella (2002)
- Platoon of Ruin (2007)

Platoon of Ruin was longlisted for the Arabic Booker Prize in 2009.
