= Georges Tarabichi =

Syrian writer, literary critic and translator

George Tarabishi (1939 – March 16, 2016; Arabic: جورج طرابيشي) was a Syrian writer, literary critic and translator. He translated over 200 books into Arabic, including works by Hegel, Freud, Sartre and Simone de Beauvoir.

== Life ==
Born in Aleppo, George Tarabishi was educated at the University of Damascus, where he gained a B.A. in Arabic and a M.A. in Education. He was director of Damascus Radio from 1963 to 1964. He was chief editor of the Journal for Arab Studies from 1972 to 1984 and of Unity Magazine from 1984 to 1989. He left Lebanon for France during the Lebanese Civil War, and settled in Paris. He spent 20 years writing a four volume critique of the Moroccan philosopher Mohamed Abed al-Jabri's Naqd al-ʿaql al-ʿArabī (Critique of Arab Reason), culminating in his work, naqd naqd al-‘aql al-‘arabī (Critique of the Critique of Arab Reason).

In 2012 Tarabishi was chair of judges for the International Prize for Arabic Fiction. Georges Tarabishi died on March 16, 2016, in Paris, France at the age of 77.

== Selected works ==
- Sartre and Marxism (Sartar wa-l-marksiyyah; Beirut: Dar al-Tali'ah, 1964).
- The Sino-Soviet Split: A Critical-Ideological Study (al-Niza' al-sufyati al-sini: dirasah aydiyulujiyyah naqdiyyah; Beirut: Dar al-Adab, 1968).
- God in Naguib Mahfouz's Symbolistic Journey (Allah fi rihlat Najib Mahfuz al-ramziyyah; Beirut: Dar al-Tali'ah li-l-Tiba'ah wa-l-Nashr, 1973).
- East and West: Masculinity and Femininity (Sharq wa-gharb: rujulah wa-unuthah; Beirut: Dar al-Tali'ah li-l-Tiba'ah wa-l-Nashr, 1977).
- The Symbolism of the Woman in the Arabic Novel and Other Studies (Ramziyyah al-mar'ah fi al-riwayah al-'arabiyyah wa-dirasat ukhra; Beirut: Dar al-Tali'ah, 1981).
- The Regional State and the Theory of Nationalism (al-Dawlah al-qutriyyah wa-l-nazariyyah al-qawmiyyah; Beirut: Dar al-Tali'ah, 1982).
- The Oedipus Complex in the Arabic Novel ('Uqdat Udib fi al-riwayah al-'arabiyyah; Beirut: Dar al-Tali'ah, 1982).
- Masculinity and the Ideology of Masculinity in the Arabic Novel (al-Rujulah wa-aydiyulujiyya al-rujulah fi al-riwayah al-'arabiyyah; Beirut: Dar al-Tali'ah, 1983).
- Woman Against Her Sex: A Psychoanalytic Study of the Literature of Nawal al-Sa'dawi (Untha didd al-unuthah: dirasah fi adab Nawal al-Sa'dawi 'ala daw' al-tahlil al-nafsi; Beirut: Dar al-Tali'ah, 1984).
- The Slaughter of Heritage in Contemporary Arab Culture (Madhbahat al-turath fi al-thaqafah al-'arabiyyah al-mu'asirah; London: Dar al-Saqi, 1993).
- Arab Intellectuals and Heritage: Psychological Analysis of a Collective Neurosis (al-Muthaqqafun al-'arab wa-l-turath: al-tahlil al-nafsi li-'usab jama'i; London: Riyad al-Rayyis, 1991).
- The Novelist and His Hero: Approaching the Unconscious in the Arabic Novel (al-Riwa'i wa-bataluh: muqarabat al-la shu'ur fi al-riwayah al-'arabiyyah; Beirut: Dar al-Adab,1995).
- On the Culture of Democracy (Fi thaqafat al-dimuqratiyyah; Beirut: Dar al-Tali'ah, 1998).
- Destinies of Philosophy in Christianity and Islam (Masa'ir al-falsafah fi-l-masihiyyah wa-l-islam; Beirut: Dar al-Saqi, 1998).
- The Problematics of Democracy in the Arab World (Ishkaliyyat al-dimuqratiyyah fi al-watan al-'arabi; Amman: Muntada 'Abd al-Hamid Shoman al-thaqafi, 1998).
- From Renaissance to Apostasy: Divergences in Arab Culture in the Age of Globalization (Min al-nahdah ila al-riddah: tamazzuqat al-thaqafah al-'arabiyyah fi 'asr al-'awlamah; London: Dar al-Saqi, 2000).
- Critique of Jaberi's Critique of Arab Reason (Naqd naqd al-'aql al-'arabi, 4 volumes; Beirut: Dar al-Saqi, 1999-2004).
- Reason in Retirement in Islam (al-'Aql al-mustaqil fi al-islam; Beirut: Dar al-Saqi, 2004).
- Sick with the West (al-Marad bi-l-gharb; Damascus: Dar Bitra li-l-nashr wa-l-tawzi', 2005).
- Heresies, vol. 1: On Democracy, Secularism, Modernism and Arab Resistance (Hartaqat: 'an al-dimuqratiyyah wa-l-'almaniyyah wa-l-hadathah wa-l-mumana'ah al-'arabiyyah, vol. 1; Beirut: Dar al-Saqi, 2006).
- Heresies, vol. 2: On Secularism as an Intra-Islamic Problematic (Hartaqat: 'an al-'almaniyyah ka-ishkaliyyah islamiyyah-islamiyyah; Beirut: Dar al-Saqi, 2006).
- Secularism in the Arab East (al-'Almaniyyah fi al-mashriq al-'arabi; Damascus: Dar al-Bitra li-l-nashr wa-l-tawzi', 2007).
- The Miracle, or The Slumber of Reason in Islam (al-Mu'jizah, aw Subat al-'aql fi al-islam; Beirut: Dar al-Saqi, 2008).
- From the Islam of the Qur'an to the Islam of the Hadith: An Emergence Resumed (Min islam al-qur'an ila islam al-hadith: al-nash'ah al-musta'nafah; Beirut: Dar al-Saqi, 2010).
