= Abdelmajid Sebbata =

Moroccan writer and translator (born 1989)

- عبد المجيد سباطة
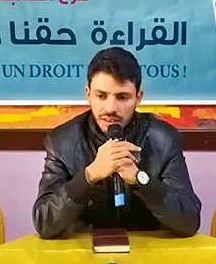
- Abdelmajid Sebbata
- Born: 1989 (age 36–37); Rabat, Morocco
- Education: Abdelmalek Essaadi University, King Fahd School of Translation
- Occupations: Writer, translator, engineer
- Writing career
- Period: 2010s–present
- Genres: Fiction, non-fiction
- Notable work: The Outcast (2019)
- Notable awards: Shortlisted for the International Prize for Arabic Fiction (2020)

Abdelmajid Sebbata (Arabic: عبد المجيد سباطة; born 1989) is a Moroccan writer and translator.

== Life ==
He was born in Rabat and studied engineering at Abdelmalek Essaadi University in Tangiers. He has also studied at the King Fahd School of Translation in Tangiers.

In addition to being an award-winning author, Sabata is also a translator. He has translated two novels by the French writer Michel Bussi.

Sabata's 2020 novel File 42 was shortlisted for the International Prize for Arabic Fiction in 2021 (also called the "Arabic Booker Prize"). He was among the youngest writers on that year's list, at the time 32 years of age.

== Works ==
He has written three novels:

- Behind the Wall of Passion (2015),
- The Zero Hour 00:00 (2017) (winner of the Moroccan Book Award)
- File 42 (2020) (nominated for the Arabic Booker Prize)
