= Mohammed Harradi =

Moroccan writer

Mohammed Harradi (born 1946) is a Moroccan writer. He was born in Kenitra. A lifelong public servant, he worked primarily in the field of education.

As a writer, he has published in a range of genres: novels, short stories, and non-fiction. His 2022 novel Melody of the Rabbit was nominated for the Arabic Booker Prize.

== Works ==
- The Bitter Almond (novel, 1980)
- Dreams of a Cow (novel, 1988)
- Rooster of the North (novel, 2001)
- Dante (novel, 2015)
- Melody of the Rabbit (novel, 2022).
- The Cat's Tail (short stories, 1990)
- Noubir Amaoui: On the Summit of a Mountain (biography, 1995)
