= Ahmed Alfaitouri =

Libyan writer

Ahmed Alfaitouri (born 1955) is a Libyan writer and journalist. He was born in Benghazi, and started out as a journalist when he was in his teens, co-founding a theatre group and editing its in-house journal. He went on become a noted cultural correspondent, at outlets such as the al-Fajr al-Jadid newspaper and The Cultural Week magazine.

He fell foul of the Gaddafi dictatorship and spent a decade in prison from 1978 to 1988. Here too he brought out a prison publication called al-Nawafir (Fountains). After his release, he co-founded and edited No magazine. Most recently, he runs the al-Mayadin weekly out of Benghazi.

Alfaitouri has published several books including novels and literary criticism. He served on the judging panel of the 2014 Arabic Booker Prize.
