= Ahmed Vall Ould Dine =

Mauritanian journalist, writer and novelist

- أحمد فال الدين
- Education: PhD; Master's degree in Comparative Religion
- Occupations: Journalist, writer and novelist
- Years active: 2004–present
- Employer: Al Jazeera Media Network
- Notable work: Hosted by the Gaddafi Brigades; Al-Hadaqi; Al-Shaybani; The Stone of Earth; Danishmand
- Awards: Leading African Journalist (2026)

Ahmed Vall Ould Dine (Arabic: أحمد فال الدين; also rendered as Ahmed Vall Dine, Ahmed Fal Al Din and Ahmed Vall Ould el-Dine) is a Mauritanian journalist, writer and novelist. He has worked for Al Jazeera Media Network as a correspondent, journalist, editor and programme presenter, and has published fiction, biography and journalistic nonfiction.

Ahmed Vall Ould Dine (Arabic: أحمد فال الدين; also rendered as Ahmed Vall Dine, Ahmed Fal Al Din and Ahmed Vall Ould el-Dine) is a Mauritanian journalist, writer and novelist. He has worked for Al Jazeera Media Network as a correspondent, journalist, editor and programme presenter, and has published fiction, biography and journalistic nonfiction.

== Early life and education ==
Ould Dine grew up in Mauritania in an environment strongly influenced by classical Arabic literature. His father was knowledgeable about Arabic poetry, history and literature and had memorised Maqamat al-Hariri. Ould Dine has recalled memorising dozens of poems from the pre-Islamic and Islamic periods during his early years, an experience that deepened his connection with classical Arabic and later influenced his writing.

He holds a master's degree in Comparative Religion. In 2025, he defended a doctoral thesis on the representation of the Other in the works of the Abbasid writer al-Jahiz. The thesis examined representations of ethnic, religious and geographical Others in al-Jahiz's writings.

== Career ==
=== Journalism ===
Ould Dine worked as a journalist for various Mauritanian newspapers from 2004 to 2007. From 2007 to 2008, he worked at the Qatari newspaper Al Arab as an editor, translator and weekly columnist. He joined Al Jazeera in 2008 as a correspondent in Johannesburg, South Africa. From 2010 to 2013, he worked in Al Jazeera's newsroom as a senior journalist, political affairs editor and part-time correspondent, and from 2013 to 2021 he worked as a senior producer in Al Jazeera English's Editorial Standards and Quality Division.

In March 2011, while reporting for Al Jazeera during the Libyan civil war, Ould Dine was detained by forces loyal to Muammar Gaddafi. He and three other Al Jazeera journalists had entered Libya through the Tunisian border and were covering fighting between rebels and pro-Gaddafi forces around Zawiya, west of Tripoli.

The detention prompted efforts in Mauritania to secure his release. The Mauritanian Journalists' Union said that Libyan authorities had confirmed that Ould Dine was in good health and that arrangements were being pursued for his release. The Mauritanian News Agency reported on 11 April that Libyan authorities had released him following mediation by Mauritanian President Mohamed Ould Abdel Aziz. Reporters Without Borders also recorded his release on 11 April.

The experience became the basis for his book Hosted by the Gaddafi Brigades, published in 2012. The work recounts his detention in Libya and was later translated into English as In Gaddafi's Clutches.

Since 2021, Ould Dine has worked as a journalist and correspondent for Al Jazeera and has presented African Tales on the network's Atheer platform. In 2026, Al Jazeera named him Leading African Journalist for his work on the programme.

=== Literary career ===
Ould Dine's literary work includes fiction, biography and journalistic nonfiction. His novels Al-Hadaqi and Al-Shaybani were published in 2018 and 2019 respectively. His 2021 book The Stone of the Earth: The Struggle of Conquerors and Protectors in Afghanistan draws on his reporting from Afghanistan and places contemporary events within the country's political and social history.

His work has also received attention from international literary publications. New Lines Magazine described Danishmand as his fifth book and noted the connection between his work as an Al Jazeera correspondent and his interest in historical archives and fiction. Asymptote has featured his work under the name Ahmed Fal Al Din and reported on his selection for the 2025 International Prize for Arabic Fiction shortlist.

== Danishmand ==
Ould Dine's novel Danishmand was published in 2023. It is a fictionalised biography of the Islamic theologian and philosopher Al-Ghazali, following his intellectual and spiritual development and his movement between scholarship, political life and spiritual retreat.

Ould Dine has said that his interest in al-Ghazali began when he was 18, when he read Deliverance from Error, al-Ghazali's account of his philosophical and spiritual journey. The idea remained with him until he began writing novels, when it returned as the basis for Danishmand.

For the novel, Ould Dine carried out extensive historical research. He read al-Ghazali's surviving works and biographies, studied historical chronicles covering the period of his life, consulted accounts by travellers who visited the cities associated with him, and read contemporary scholarship on his thought and philosophy.

Danishmand was included on the longlist for the International Prize for Arabic Fiction in 2025. The longlist source identifies Ould Dine as one of the debut authors on that year's list and Danishmand as a Mauritanian novel published by Masciliana Editions.

The novel subsequently reached the six-book shortlist for the 2025 prize. ArabLit described it as the first Mauritanian novel to reach the shortlist, while Asymptote also identified Ould Dine as a first-time IPAF nominee.

Ould Dine has described the novel's achievement as significant for Mauritanian literature, where poetry has traditionally occupied a more established place than the novel. In discussing the shortlist, he said that Mauritanian writers working in Arabic have limited institutional and publishing support and that greater opportunities for younger writers could help develop the country's novelistic tradition.

== Bibliography ==
- Hosted by the Gaddafi Brigades (2012)
- Al-Hadaqi (2018)
- Al-Shaybani (2019)
- The Stone of the Earth: The Struggle of Conquerors and Protectors in Afghanistan (2021)
- Danishmand (2023)
- Mirrors of Abu Uthman: Images of Peoples and Religions in the Legacy of al-Jahiz (2026)
