= Yaa'rab al-Eissa =

Syrian journalist and writer

Yaa'rab al-Eissa is a Syrian writer and journalist. He was born near Hama in 1969. Based in Damascus, he has worked as a professional journalist for more than three decades. His debut novel The White Minaret was nominated for the Arabic Booker Prize in 2022.
