= Rabia Raihane =

Moroccan writer

Rabia Raihane (Arabic: ربيعة ريحان; born 1951) is a Moroccan writer.

She has published eight short story collections, among them the prize-winning 1999 book Women’s Rain. She has also published several novels:

- The Family House (2022)
- Ways of Loving (2013)
- Aunt Um Hani (2020)

The Family House was nominated for the Arabic Booker Prize. Her work has been published in Banipal magazine, and has been translated into several European languages.

She is a former head of the Moroccan Writers' Union.
