= George Yaraq =

Lebanese journalist and novelist

George Yaraq (born 1958) is a Lebanese journalist and novelist.

His first novel Night was published in 2013. His second novel Guard of the Dead was shortlisted for the 2016 Arabic Booker Prize.
