= Nasser Iraq =

Egyptian writer and journalist

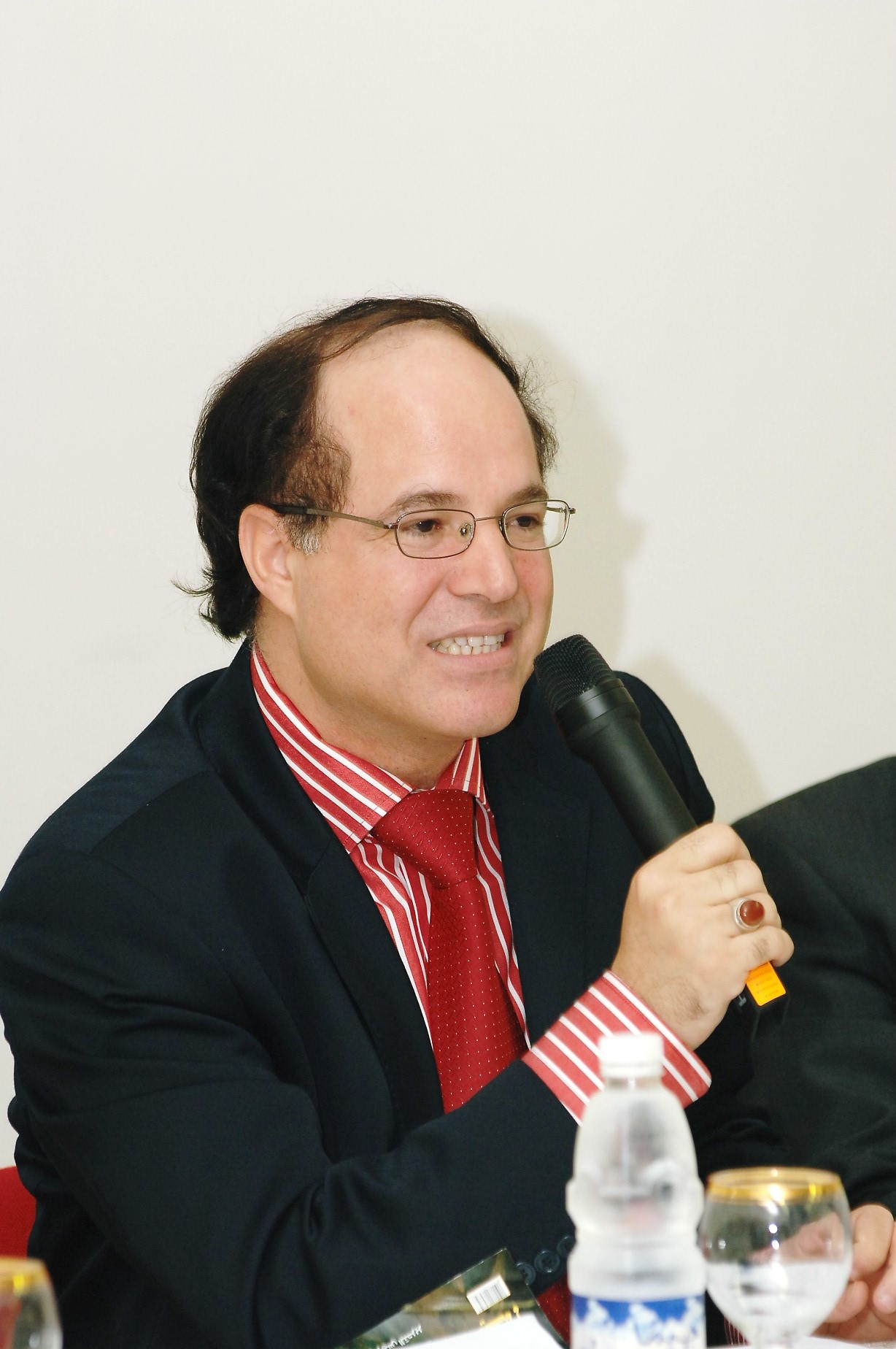
Nasser Iraq, a Journalist and an Egyptian writer

Nasser Abelfatah Ibrahim Iraq is an Egyptian writer and journalist. A graduate of Cairo University, he has worked as a cultural correspondent in both Egypt and Dubai. He is the co-founder and managing editor of the Dubai-based Al-Thaqafiya magazine.

His books include:

- A History of Journalistic Art in Egypt (2002) (winner of the inaugural Ahmad Bahaa al-Din Prize)
- Times of the Dust (2006)
- From the Excess of Love (2008)
- The Green and the Damaged (2009)
- The Unemployed (2011) (nominated for the Arabic Booker Prize)
- ‘’Al Ezbkeya’’ (2016) winner of the katara prize

He lives and works in Dubai.
