= Ahmed Muhsin =

Lebanese writer

Ahmed Muhsin (born 1984) is a Lebanese writer. He studied economics at Beirut Arab University, and has since worked as a journalist for various Lebanese newspapers. His first book The Maker of Games was longlisted for the Sheikh Zayed Book Award in 2014-15, while his second novel Warsaw a Little While Ago was nominated for the Arabic Booker Prize.
