= Umaima al-Khamis =

Saudi Arabian novelist (born 1966)

Umaima Abdullah al-Khamis (Arabic: أميمة الخميس, romanized: Umaymah al-Khamīs; born 1966) is a Saudi Arabian writer and novelist. She was born in Riyadh and studied Arabic literature at King Saud University. She works in the Saudi civil service.

Al-Khamis has published a number of books, including short story collections, children's books and novels. Her two novels to date are: Sailors and The Leafy Tree. The latter was longlisted for the 2010 Arabic Booker Prize.

== Works ==
- Sailors
- The Leafy Tree
- The Book Smuggler 2021
