= Siddik Hadj-Ahmed =

Algerian writer (born 1967)

Siddik Hadj-Ahmed (born 1967) is an Algerian writer. He was born in Adrar, where he now teaches linguistics at Adrar University.

He is known for his writings on the Sahara desert. He has written three novels: The Kingdom of Ziwan (2013), Comrade (2016), and Drought (2021), the last of which was shortlisted for the Arabic Booker Prize.
