= Maudie Bitar =

Lebanese journalist and critic

Maudie Bitar (Arabic: مودي بيطار) is a Lebanese journalist and critic. She has worked for and published extensively in an-Nahar (Lebanon) and al-Hayat (London) newspapers. She writes a regular column on Western literature in al-Hayat. Her articles have also appeared in al-Wasat, and Banipal published her original review of Syrian author Haifa Bitar in an English translation by Issa Boullata. In January 2012, she was named as a judge for the 2012 Arabic Booker Prize.
