= Ismail Ghazali =

Moroccan writer

Ismail Ghazali (Arabic: إسماعيل غزالي; born 1977) is a Moroccan writer. He was born in the Berber village of M'rirt in northern Morocco. He studied Arabic literature at university.

To date, he has published several novels and novellas and six collections of short stories. His book Garden of the Spotted Gazelle was shortlisted for the Moroccan Book Prize in 2012. His novel The Season of Pike Fishing was longlisted for the 2014 Arabic Booker Prize.
