= Antoine Douaihy =

Lebanese novelist and poet

Antoine Douaihy (Arabic: أنطوان الدويهي; born 1948) is a Lebanese novelist and poet. He obtained a PhD in anthropology from the Sorbonne in Paris in 1979. He stayed in France till the nineties before returning to Lebanon, where he now teaches at the Lebanese University. His novels include:

- The Book of the Current State (1993)
- The Garden of Dawn (1999)
- Hierarchies of Absence (2000)
- Royal Solitude (2001)
- Crossing Over Rubble (2003)
- The Bearer of the Purple Rose (2013)

His latest novel The Bearer of the Purple Rose was longlisted for the 2014 Arabic Booker Prize.
