= Ahmed Menour =

Algerian writer

Ahmed Menour (born 1945) is an Algerian writer. He was born in El Ançor in the outskirts of Oran. He taught at the University of Algiers for many years. He writes fiction for both adults and young readers.

His works include:

- For Both Their Sakes, I Lived (2019)
- The Prince Returns in the Middle of the Night (2021)
- The Great Bazaar (2022)
- Storm over the Islands (2022)

Storm over the Islands was nominated for the Arabic Booker Prize.
