= Ashraf al-Khamaisi =

Egyptian novelist and short story writer (born 1967)

- Born: 1967 (age 58–59); Luxor
- Occupation: Egyptian novelist

Ashraf al-Khamaisi (born 1967) is an Egyptian novelist and short story writer. He was born in Luxor.

== Career ==
To date, he has published three collections of short stories and two novels. His 2013 novel God's Land of Exile was longlisted for the Arabic Booker Prize. Earlier, his short story "The Four Wheels of the Hand-Pushed Cart" won the top prize in a pan-Arab short story competition organised by Akhbar al-Adab.

He lives and works in Cairo, as an editor for Al-Thaqafa Al-Jadida magazine.
