= Tareq Bakari =

Moroccan writer (born 1988)

Tareq Bakari (born 1988) is a Moroccan writer. He was born in Missour in eastern Morocco, and studied Arabic literature at Sidi Mohamed Ben Abdellah University in Fes. His debut novel Numedia (2015) was nominated for the Arabic Booker Prize. He works as an Arabic language teacher in Meknes.
