= Abdulatif Ould Abdullah =

Algerian writer (born 1988)

Abdelatif Ouldabdallah
- عبد اللطيف ولد عبد الله
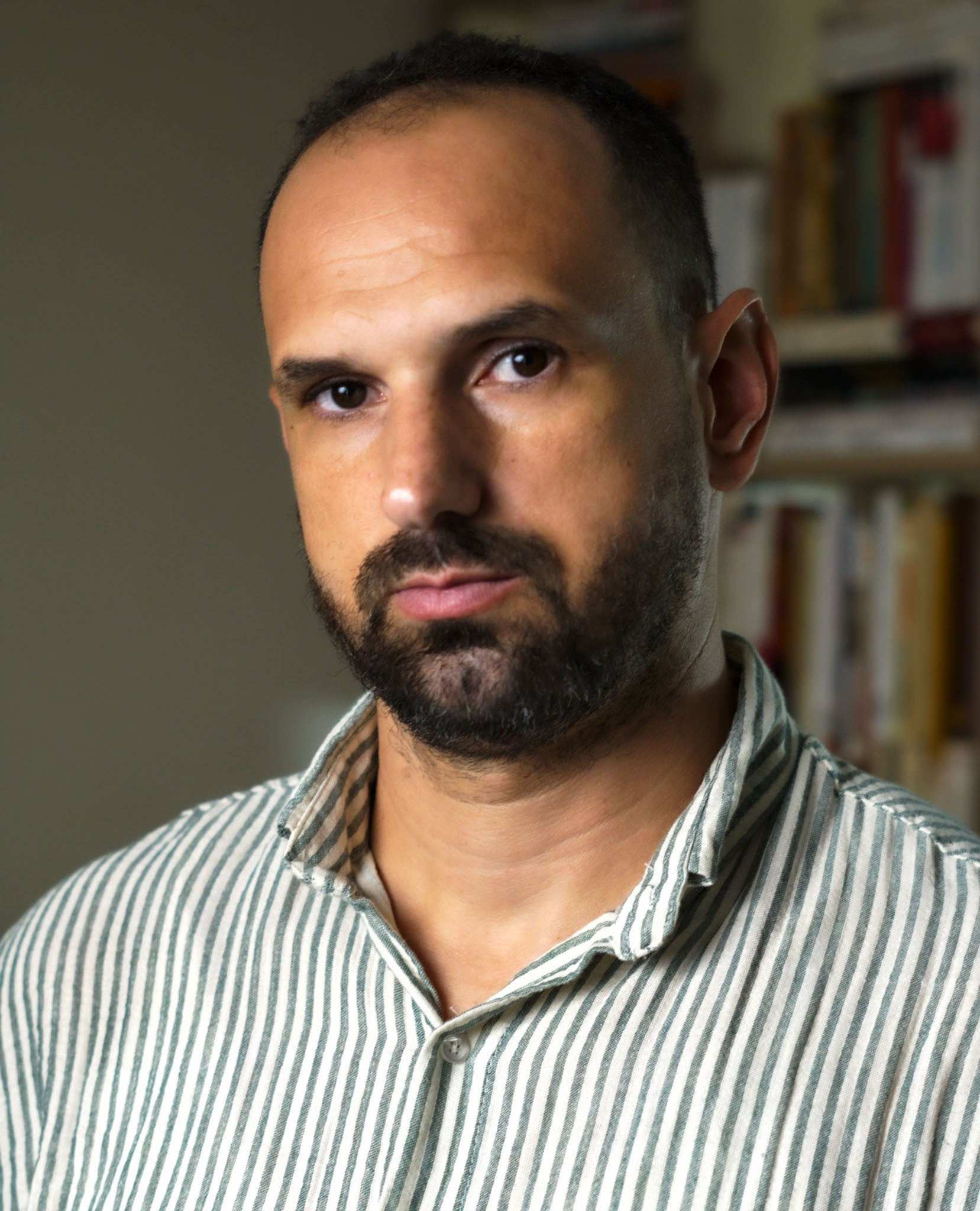
- Born: 1988 (age 37–38); Mostaganem, Algeria
- Education: University of Mostaganem (Architecture)
- Occupation: Writer
- Writing career
- Language: Arabic
- Notable works: Out of Control (2016), Flaunting Finery (2018), The Eye of Hammurabi (2020)
- Notable awards: Shortlisted for the International Prize for Arabic Fiction (2021)

Abdelatif Ouldabdallah is an Algerian writer. He was born in 1988 in the city of Mostaganem. He studied architecture at the University of Algiers.

He has written three novels:

- Out of Control (2016)
- Flaunting Finery (2018)
- The Eye of Hammurabi (2020)

He was shortlisted for the International Prize for Arabic Fiction in 2021.
