= Janan Jasim Halawi =

Iraqi writer and poet

- Born: 1956; Iraq
- Resting place: Sweden
- Education: BA in Electronic Engineering
- Occupation(s): Writer, poet

Janan Jasim Halawi (Arabic:جنان جاسم حلاوي) (born 1956)، an Iraqi writer and novelist, was born in 1956. He has published three poetry collections, seven short story collections, and six novels including “People of the Palms” which was nominated for the long list of the International Prize for Arabic Fiction in 2016.

== ِEducation and career ==
Jana Jassim Hillawi was born in Iraq on September 6, 1956. He obtained a bachelor’s degree in Electrical Engineering in Iraq. He worked as a journalist for the Lebanese newspaper Al-Nahar. He migrated to Sweden in 1992.

Hillawi Began his writing career in the early 1980s, when he published his first short story collection entitled “Mermaid of the Sea” publishing by Ministry of Culture of Iraq in 1981. Then he published his first novel “Ya Kokti” in 1991. Hillawi writes poetry, short stories and novels. Until now, he has published three poetry collections, seven short story collections, and six novels including “Paths and Dust” and “People of the Palms” which was nominate for the long list of the International Prize for Arabic Fiction in 2016. Also, his novel “Night of the Land” was translated into French and was publishing by Act Saute in 2005. His 2015 novel People of the Palms was nominated for the Arabic Booker Prize.

== Works ==
- Mermaid of the Sea (original title: Ara’s al-bahr), 1981
- Ya Kokti (original title: Yā kawkatī), 1991
- Love Stories, War stories (original title: Qisas al-hob qisas al-harb), 1998
- Night of the Land (original title: Layl al-bilād), 2002
- Paths and Dust (original title: Durūb wa ġubār), 2003
- Hot Places (original title: Amākin ḥārraẗ), 2006
- Not Much Air (original title: Hawāʼ qalīl ), 2009
- People of the Palms (original title: Ahl al-nak̲īl), 2015
