= Badriya Albadri =

Omani poet and writer

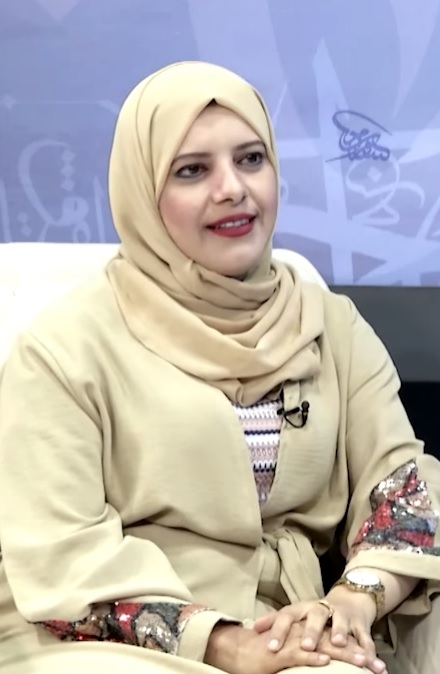
Omani poet Badria al-Badri, Bayt al-Qasida program, Alrafidain TV - Aug 19, 2019

Badriya al-Badri is an Omani author. She was born in Muscat in 1975.

She writes in a variety of genres: classical and contemporary Arabic poetry, fiction for adults and children, writings for magazines and TV. Her work has appeared in many Arabic-language outlets. She is a long-time contributor to the children's magazine Murshid, and she is also a scriptwriter for children's TV.

Al-Badri took part in the IPAF Nadwa literary workshop in 2017. In 2024, her novel Foumbi was nominated for the Arabic Booker Prize. She has also won a number of literary prizes for her work.

In translation, her writing has appeared in Arablit Quarterly and Writers Without Borders. Her novel The Last Crossing was translated into English by Katherine Van De Vate and came out in 2024.

== Selected works ==
- Narrow Valley (2018, poetry)
- Closer to the Waving of a Poem (2019, poetry)
- Behind Loss (2015, novel)
- The Last Crossing (2017, novel)
- The Shadow of Hermaphroditus (2018, novel)
- Foumbi (2022, novel)
- Smoothie, the Adventurer (2021, children's book)
- The Scarecrow (2021, children's book)
