= Ahmad Abdulatif =

Egyptian writer and translator

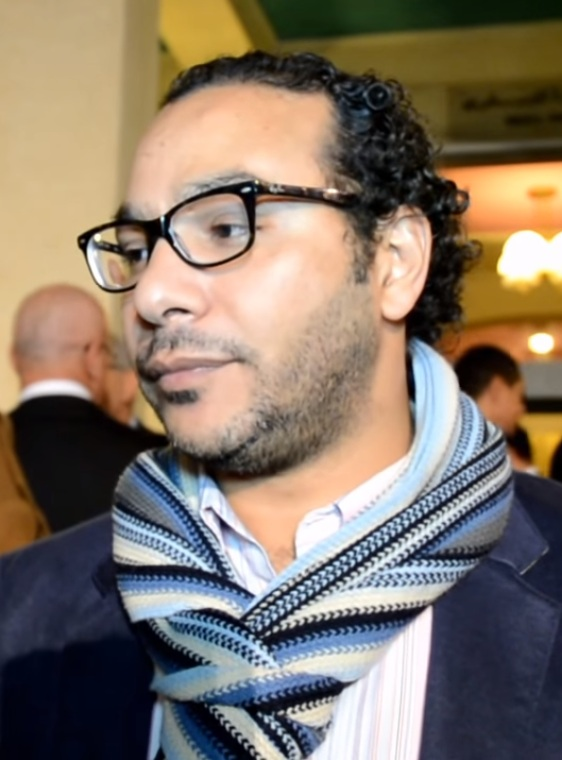
Ahmad Abdulatif, January 2016

Ahmad Abdulatif (born 1978) is an Egyptian writer and translator. He studied BA and Arabic in Madrid and Granada. He has written five novels and has won several prizes.

== Selected works ==
- The Keymaker (2010), winner of the 2011 the National Prize of novel
- The Clairvoyant (2012)
- The Book of the Sculptor (2013), winner of the 2015 Sawiris Cultural Award
- Elias (2014)
- The Earthen Fortress (2017), nominated for the 2018 International Prize for Arabic Fiction
- The Origin of Species, shortlisted for the 2026 International Prize for Arabic Fiction
