= Mohammed Al-Maazuz =

Moroccan scholar and writer

Mohammed Al-Maazuz (born 1959) is a Moroccan scholar and writer. He has a PhD in Political Anthropology from the Sorbonne in Paris and another PhD in Arabic Thought (Philosophy) from Mohammed V University in Rabat. He is an author in the field of political anthropology. He is also a novelist. His 2007 novel The Flutter of Seasons won the Moroccan Book Prize. A more recent novel What Sin Caused Her to Die? was nominated for the Arabic Booker Prize.

== Selected works ==
- Islam and Politics (2001)
- Aesthetics in Classical Arabic Thought (2002)
- Political Preoccupations: Documenting Standpoints (2016)
- The Flutter of Seasons (novel)
- What Sin Caused Her to Die? (novel)
