= Sausan Jamil Hasan =

Syrian doctor and writer (born 1957)

Sausan Jamil Hasan (born 1957) is a Syrian doctor and writer. She trained in medicine at Tishreen University in Latakia. After three decades of working as a doctor at both home and abroad, she gave up her medical career to become a full-time writer. Her works include:

- Harir al-Zalam (Silk of Darkness) 2009,
- Alf Layla fi Layla (A Thousand Nights in One Night) 2010,
- Al-Nabbashun (The Waste Pickers) 2012,
- Qamis al-Layl (Night Gown) 2014.

Her 2022 novel My Name is Zayzafoune was nominated for the Arabic Booker Prize.
