= Hussein Yassin =

Palestinian writer (born 1943)

Hussein Yassin (born 1943) (Arabic: حسين ياسين) is a Palestinian writer. He was born in the village of Arrabat al-Battuf in northern Galilee. He studied economics and accounting in Leningrad and Haifa respectively. An accountant by profession, he retired in 2010 and now lives in Jerusalem. He has written three novels: Lanterns of Gloom (2006); Duha (2012) and Ali, the Story of an Honourable Man (2017), the last of which was nominated for the Arabic Booker Prize.
