= Ibrahim al-Zaarur =

Palestinian writer

Ibrahim al-Zaarur (born 1939) (Arabic: إبراهيم زعرور) is a Palestinian short story writer, novelist and journalist. He has written eight novels and his most recent book The Amazing Journey of Khair al-Din ibn Zard was nominated for the 2012 Arabic Booker Prize. Zaarur lives in Amman, Jordan.
