= Mohamed al-Refai =

Egyptian critic, novelist and writer

Mohamed al-Refai is an Egyptian critic, novelist and writer. Since 1980, he has been writing for the Egyptian magazine Sabah al-Khair. He has also written a number of books, radio plays, television series, and film scripts. Al-Refai's novel Nocturnal Creatures of Sadness was nominated for the Arabic Booker Prize in 2012.

Al-Refai lives and works in Cairo.

== Selected works ==
=== Books ===
- Palestine in Egyptian Theatre
- Experiments in Arab Theatre

=== Radio plays ===
- A Journey in Olden Times
- Paradise Lost
- Papers of the Barada River

=== TV series ===
- The Overcoat (based on Nikolai Gogol's short story)
- The White (based on a novel by Yusef Idriss)
- The Extoller of the Moon (based on the life of the Egyptian composer Baligh Hamdi)

=== Film scripts ===
- The Case of Mr. Mungid
- Stolen Dreams
