= Shahad Al Rawi =

Iraqi writer (born 1986)

- شهد الراوي
- Born: 1 February 1986 (age 40); Baghdad, Iraq
- Occupations: Novelist, short-story writer, essayist, Anthropologist
- Writing career
- Period: 2016–present
- Genres: Fiction, magical realism, postmodernism, Bildungsroman, realism
- Notable works: The Baghdad Clock (novel) (2016); Over The Jumhuriya Bridge (novel) (2020)
- Notable awards: First Book Award at the Edinburgh International Book Festival (2018)

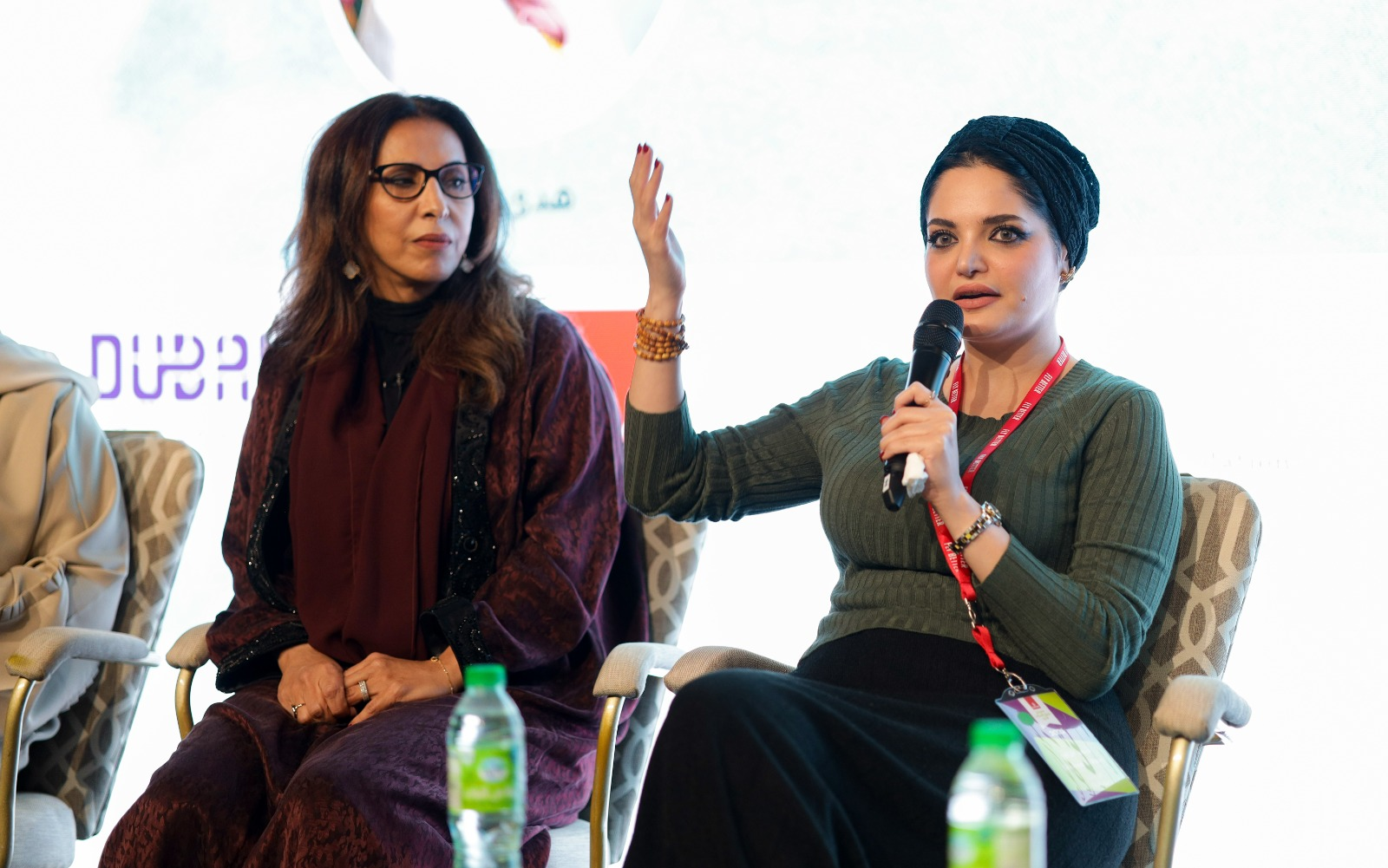

Shahad Al Rawi (Arabic: شهد الراوي) is an Iraqi author, Anthropologist, and novelist. She was born and raised in Baghdad, Iraq. Her debut novel The Baghdad Clock (2016) was nominated for the Arabic Booker Prize and was shortlisted, marking herself the youngest author to reach the list at that time. It has also been translated into more than 20 languages. The Baghdad Clock won the First Book Award at the Edinburgh International Book Festival.

== Biography ==
Al-Rawi was born in Baghdad, Iraq on February 1, 1986, to Iraqi parents, her origins go back to the city of Rawa, in the Anbar Province, in western Iraq. She completed her high school education in Baghdad and then left Iraq for Syria after 2003. She completed her college degree at Damascus University (Syria) obtaining a bachelor's degree from the College of Management and Economics in Business Administration. She then obtained a master's degree in Human Resource Management at the same university. Shahd Al-Rawi completed her PhD with Distinction in Administrative Anthropology in 2019 in the United Arab Emirates.

She was raised by a middle class Iraqi family, where her father was an economist and her mother a pharmacist. She mentions them as a major influence in encouraging her to write and have supported her along her journey.

== Writing career ==
Al-Rawi's career began through publishing a number of essays and poems in major Arab newspapers, publications, and through social media platforms, which garnered the public's attention to the relatively young author's writing. Writing almost exclusively in the Arabic language, Al-Rawi displays a deep understanding of her audience, in particular middle class Iraqi females, and the general Iraqi and Arab population. Her background in the humanities, in particular Anthropology, has been reflected through her novels, representing individual and ethnographic changes in pre-war, post-war, and at war populations. Some of these represent the Mahalla المحلة as a ship at sea, its inhabitants reflecting a demographic voiced through their day to day conversations throughout her debut novel The Baghdad Clock in particular.

== The Baghdad Clock (2016) ==
The author's debut novel The Baghdad Clock received acclaim for its technical prowess in channeling time as a narrator within an unconventional structure. Its narrative is described by critics as carrying a boldness in which the author goes beyond the logical and temporal succession of events, incorporating dreams, memories and illusions into reality and vice versa, to tell the story of a generation born to war, and raised under sanctions only to usher in yet another war.

During an interview Al-Rawi says, “My novel about the people of my generation and my city, Baghdad, which I left and did not leave me, about our childhood, adolescence, youth, and our hopes and dreams which I tried to protect from forgetfulness and prevent from being lost". Incorporating memory and illusion, after limiting the role of reason and logic in drawing the expected natural endings, the author allows for open ended and unanswered questions, as does life in its entirety. And she adds, “Technically, I owe a lot not to the great international novelists who I have read some of their works, but to the young female novelists who have begun to take their rightful places in the postmodern novel, especially in the US, Canada, Australia and the United Kingdom, and whom I consider the first wave of female novelists of the era. Such authors I've been influenced by include Emma Cline, Jojo Moyes, H. L. Dennis and others, as the novel has become with them a world of deep emotional flow, which does not hesitate to accept illusions and dreams as a real part of the living reality, and they have no problem for magic to interfere in changing the direction of events and its reformulation without sacrificing reality".

== Over the Jumhuriya Bridge (2020) ==
In what some critics described as a temporal continuation of Al-Rawi's debut novel, in Over The Jumhuriya Bridge (2020) the reader follows scenes from the US led invasion of Iraq in 2003 and events immediately leading up to them, affecting not one but three generations at once: grandparents, parents and children, and how one site, The Jumhuriya Bridge (The Republican Bridge) in the capital city of Baghdad, played a major role in the lives of one family representing the typical middle class Iraqi family.

The heroine of "Over the Jumhuriya Bridge" recalls how American tanks crossed into the heart of Baghdad, indicating the end of Iraq that everyone knew and the beginning of the unknown journey that many people had to take.

In “Over the Jumhuriya Bridge,” a theme is that of escaping and longing for the past. A mother's longing for the past is shown when she talks about her school, and while people often look romantically at the past, in the novel even good times are tinged with sadness, such as the death of her uncle during the first war that Iraq suffered in the 1980s.

Following Al-Rawi's debut novel, readers can observe a sense of maturity in the novel, perhaps evident in the way in which all the characters are given space to form a bond with the readers, all of which are multidimensional with flaws and attractive qualities. Basically, these characters have been humanized through their contradictory qualities, bringing a sense of realism readers can connect with.

"Over the Bridge of the Republic" has been suggested for those dealing with loss as a model for accepting reality.
