= Aziz Mohammed =

Aziz Mohammed (Arabic: عزيز محمد; born 1987) is a Saudi Arabian writer who was born in Al-Khobar. He has written in a variety of genres, like poetry, short stories and film reviews. His first novel entitled The Critical Case of K was nominated for the Arabic Booker Prize and has been translated into English by Humphrey Davies.
