= Mohammed ʽEissa al-Muʼadab =

Tunisian writer (born 1966)

Mohammed ʽEissa al-Muʼadab (Arabic: محمد عيسى المؤدب) is a Tunisian writer. He was born in 1966.

His books include:

- Wedding of Fire (short stories, 1995), winner of the Tunisian National Short Story Prize
- Which Woman Am I? (short stories, 2013)
- Soft Jihad (novel, 2017), winner of the 2017 Tunisian Golden Comar Prize
- Hammam Dhahab ("Bath of Gold," novel, 2019), nominated for the Arabic Booker Prize
