= Lina Hawyani al-Hasan =

Syrian novelist, journalist and writer (born 1975)

Lina Hawyani al-Hasan (Arabic: لينا هوياني الحسن) (born 1975) is a Syrian novelist, journalist and writer. She studied philosophy at the University of Damascus. She runs the literary supplement of the Damascus newspaper al-Thawra. As a writer, al-Hasan has published more than half a dozen books, including novels and non-fiction. In 2010, she was selected to take part in the second IPAF Nadwa, a workshop for young writers held under the aegis of the International Prize for Arabic Fiction and Sheikh Hamdan of the UAE.
