= Sara al-Nams =

Algerian writer

Sara al-Nams is an Algerian writer and editor. She was born in 1989 in Tiaret. She studied English at Ferhat Abbas University in Sétif. She currently manages the Algerian publishing house Ajniha. She has authored several books:

- Love With An Algerian Flavour (2012)
- Water and Salt–Letters to a Palestinian Prisoner (2016)
- J (Dar al-Adab, 2019)

Her latest novel, J, was nominated for the Arabic Booker Prize in 2021.

== See also ==
- 2021 interview with Sara al-Nams by the International Prize for Arabic Fiction
