= Nizar Aghri =

Syrian-Kurdish writer and translator

- نزار آغري
- Born: 1961 (age 64–65)
- Writing career
- Language: Arabic, English

Nizar Aghri (born 1961) is a Syrian-Kurdish writer and translator. He was born in Turkey and currently lives in Oslo.

He has published three novels:

- The Papers of Mullah Za’afran (2005),
- Salem Street (2017) and
- In Search of Azar (2021).

In Search of Azar was nominated for the Arabic Booker Prize in 2022. He has also translated several books by the Italian writer Erri De Luca.
