= Boumediene Belkebir =

Algerian academic

Boumediene Belkebir (born 1979) is an Algerian academic and writer. He has published three novels: The Myth of the Strong Man (2016), Zoudj el Beghal (2018) and The Alley of the Italians (2021), the last of which was nominated for the Arabic Booker Prize. The Alley of the Italians has also been optioned for translation into Amazigh.

Belkebir teaches management at the University of Guelma, and has written academic works on his subject. He lives in Annaba.
