= Zulaikha Abu Risha =

Jordanian poet and activist

- Born: 1942 (age 83–84); Acre, Mandatory Palestine
- Education: University of Jordan (B.A., 1966; M.A., 1989); University of Exeter (PhD)
- Occupations: Poet; short story writer; columnist; editor; activist
- Writing career
- Period: 1987-present
- Genres: Poetry; Short stories
- Subjects: Art; children's literature; feminism; literature

Zulaikha Abd ar-Rahman Abu Risha (born 1942; Arabic: زليخة أبو ريشة) is a Jordanian poet and activist. She has been a vocal advocate of women's rights, particularly concerning making the Arabic language more gender-inclusive.

== Early life and education ==
Zulaikha Abu Risha was born in 1942 in Acre, a city in what is now Israel. She describes herself as having Palestinian, Jordanian, and Syrian roots.

She studied Arabic literature at the University of Jordan, graduating with a bachelor's degree in 1966 and a master's in 1989. She later pursued a doctorate at the University of Exeter, where she wrote her thesis on "Women in Arabic Feminist Literature"

== Career ==
Abu Risha is perhaps best known for her work as a poet and fiction writer. She has been considered a prominent member of the Jordanian literary scene.

In 1987, Abu Risha published the short story collection In the Cell, for which she won a prize from the University of Jordan. She has also written at least 10 books of poetry beginning in 1998, as well as a book of autobiographical essays, Ghajarul ma'a, in 1999. And she has produced several works of children's literature, as well as a 2002 academic study of the genre, Towards a Theory of Children’s Literature (2002).

Through hosting events in which refugees told folktales, she produced the book Timeless Tales: Folktales Told by Syrian Refugees, containing 21 folk stories.

Abu Risha also writes nonfiction on feminist criticism, literature, art, and gender and language. She has been a columnist for newspapers and magazines in Jordan and across the Arab world. She has also served as editor of the magazines al-Mu'allim/at-talib (published by UNESCO/UNRWA) and Al-Funun (an art journal published by the Jordanian Ministry of Culture), and as director of al-Warraqat li-d-dirasat wal-buhuth, a feminist publishing house. In 2019, she served as a judge for the International Prize for Arabic Fiction.

She has also worked as a university lecturer and served as director of the Center for Women's Studies in Amman, Jordan.

Abu Risha is also known for her work as a human rights and women's rights activist. She has fought to make the Arabic language more inclusive of women, writing two books on the subject: The Absent Language: Towards a Gender-Neutral Language (1996) and The Language Female: Papers on Discourse and Gender (2009). Her women's rights advocacy since the early 1980s has made her a target of extremist groups, which have sought to incite violence against her. She has also been the target of lawsuits from Amman's Public Prosecution Office for comments on Islam.
