= Bashir Mufti =

Algerian novelist and writer (born 1969)

Bashir Mufti (born 1969) (sometimes spelled Bachir Mufti or Bachir Mefti) is an Algerian novelist and writer. He was born in Algiers and started writing in the mid-1980s. He has published a number of novels and short story collections.

He has been nominated twice for the International Prize for Arabic Fiction, first for Toy of Fire in 2012 (which made the Prize's shortlist) and secondly for The Mingling of the Seasons in 2020.

Mufti's work has been translated into French and English. His writing has also been featured in Banipal magazine, most prominently in the Spring 2020 issue dedicated to contemporary Algerian literature. Mufti has also contributed journalistic pieces and works in Algerian television as a producer of cultural programmes.

== Selected books ==
- Ceremonies and Funerals (1998)
- Archipelago of Flies (2000)
- Witness of the Darkness (2002)
- Perfumes of the Mirage (2005)
- Trees of the Resurrection (2007)
- Maps of Nightly Passion (2009)
- Toy of Fire (novel) (2011)
- The Mingling of the Seasons (2019)
- Alone at Night (forthcoming)
