= Samir Qasimi =

Algerian writer (born 1974)

Samir Qasimi (Arabic: سمير قسيمي; born 1974) is a critically acclaimed Algerian writer.

He has published four novels:

- The Loss of a Permit (2009)
- A Great Day to Die (2009)
- Infertile Woman in Love (2012)
- The Stairs of Trolar (2019)

He has been long-listed twice for the International Prize for Arabic Fiction, first for A Great Day to Die in 2010 and secondly for The Stairs of Trolar in 2020.
