= Rouchdi Redouane =

- رشدي رضوان
- Born: 1979 (age 46–47)
- Occupations: Writer and journalist

Rouchdi Redouane (Arabic: رشدي رضوان, romanized: Rushdī Riḍwān; born 1979) is an Algerian writer and journalist. He has published across several genres including poetry, fiction and non-fiction. His books of poetry include: For Example (2010) and 33 (2013). He has won several prizes for his poetry, among them the President of the Republic Prize for Poetry (2008) and the Al-Babtain Prize for Young Poets (2016). In 2013, he published a book of travel writing titled Rixos.. Before the Fall of Gaddafi. In 2022, his novel The Hungarian was nominated for the Arabic Booker Prize.
