= Muna al-Sheemi =

Egyptian writer (born 1968)

mona elshimi (born 1968) is an Egyptian writer. She obtained a degree in archaeology from Cairo University, and currently works as a history teacher. She has published more than half a dozen works of fiction, including novels and short stories. Her work has also been published in leading Arab newspapers and magazines such as Al-Watan, Akhbar al-Adab and Al-Arabi.

Her latest book The Size of a Grape was nominated for the 2015 Arabic Booker Prize. Previously she was awarded the Egyptian General Authority for Cultural Palaces Prize for her novel A Colour Runaway from the Rainbow and the Story Club Prize for her novel The Weightier Scale.

== Publications ==
- A Colour Runaway from the Rainbow
- The Weightier Scale
- Jangling of the Bracelets
- The Size of a Grape

== Awards and nominations ==
1. The Egyptian General Authority for Cultural Palaces Prize, 2004
2. The Story Club Prize, 2004
3. BBC Radio Prize, 2014
