= Sara Alsarraf =

Iraqi writer

- سارة الصرّاف
- Born: 1975 (age 50–51)
- Education: Al Mustansiriya University

Sara Alsarraf (1975) is an Iraqi novelist and journalist. She was born in France. Her maternal grandfather was the prominent Iraqi intellectual Ahmed Susa. Her mother Alia, a World Bank staffer, died in the Canal Hotel suicide bomb attack in Baghdad in August 2003.

Alsarraf graduated from Al Mustansiriya University in Baghdad, and then turned to a career in media and journalism. She currently lives and works in the UAE. Her debut novel I Heard Everything appeared in 2023 and was nominated for the Arabic Booker Prize.
