= Khalid Al-Nasrallah =

Kuwaiti writer (born 1987)

Khalid Nasrallah (born 1987) is a Kuwaiti writer.

He obtained a BA in physical education and worked as a state employee. He writes regularly for Kuwaiti news outlets such as Al-Wasat and Al Qabas. He has also published fiction. He won a short story competition organized by Al-Araby magazine. Among his novels, The Highest Depth was nominated for Sheikh Zayed Book Award in 2017, while The White Line of Night was nominated for the 2022 Arabic Booker Prize.
