= Hazim Kamaledin =

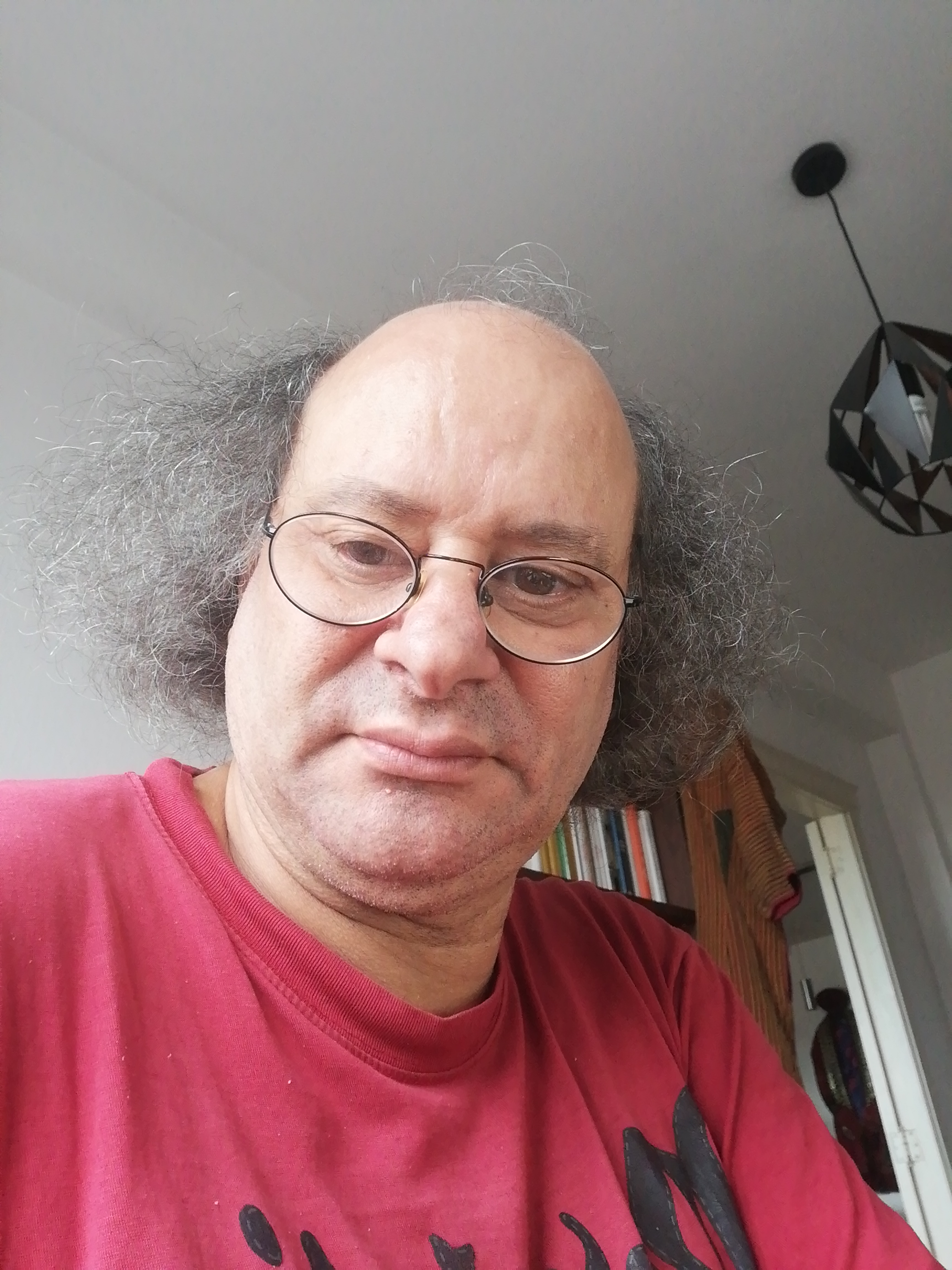
Selfie by Hazim Kamaledin

Hazim Kamaledin (Arabic: حازم كمال الدين; born in Babylon, Iraq in 1954) is an Iraqi playwright, theatre director, actor, author (novel, short story, translation), and editor, born in Babylon, Iraq. In 2014, The Arab Theatre Institute proclaimed him best playwright of the year.

== Life ==
Kamaledin studied at the Academy of Fine Arts in Baghdad, Iraq. In the late seventies. Kamaledin fled from Iraq after he had been threatened, arrested and tortured. He also made a satirical play for which he was sentenced to death. He settled in Belgium and became artistic leader of two companies: Woestijn ’93 [Desert '93] and Cactusbloem [Cactus Flower]. Kamaledin was a board member of PEN Vlaanderen PEN Vlaanderen from 2016 to 2018. He lives and works in Antwerp, Belgium.

== Awards ==
- In 2014 he was pronounced Best Theatre Writer of the Year by the Arabic Theatre Institute.
- In 2016 his novel 'Desertified Water' was nominated for the International Prize for Arabic Fiction.

== Books (as novelist, translator & playwright) ==
Novels:

- 1994 Tomb of silence (prose - anthology) published by Woestijn '93, in Arabic
- 2014 Cabaret, in Arabic كاباريهت
- 2016 Desertified Water, in Arabic
- 2016 Schoonheid raast in mij tot ik sterf, in Dutch Beauty Will Rage Within Me Until the Day I Die Flanders literature
- 2019 Meadows of Hell, in Arabic
- 2020 The Confusing Episodes of The Lady of The Necrophilia, in Arabic
- 2022 Dalia Rushie's Affaires, in Arabic
- 2023 Koninkrijken, proza/drama, in Dutch
- 2024 The heir, in Arabic

Drama:

- 2003 El Addade, in Dutch, published by Woestijn '93
- 2011 The Tomb of the Lady, four monologues, In Arabic, published by Dar Alghaoon, Lebanon
- 2016 Premeditated Insanity, in Arabic السادرون في الجنون, United Arab Emirates, published by Arab Theater Institute

Translations:

- 2019 Theater, Three monologues for an actor, by Jan Fabre, from Dutch into Arabic
- 2020 Poetry, The Armpits of the Goat, by Annemarie Estor, from Dutch into Arabic
- 2022 Theatre, The Towers of Beirut, by Paul Verrept, from Dutch to Arabic

== Theatre productions (as author & director) ==
- 1994–1995, Blauw van as
- 1995-1996 Les ombres dans le sable
- 1996-1997 Heupen met hersens
- 1997-1998 Gamma van stilte
- 1998-2000 De uren nul
- 1999-2000 Het oog van de dadel
- 1999-2000 Pijnboom
- 2001-2002 Foto's in de storm
- 2001-2002 De Kop van de Mameluk Djaber
- 2003-2004 Balling
- 2003-2004 El Sherife
- 2003-2004 El Addade
- 2004-2005 De tochten
- 2005-2006 Vvredestad
- 2007-2008 Bagdad bazaar
- 2008-2009 Oraal
- 2009-2010 De graftombe van de dame
