= Munira Al-Fadhel =

Munira A. Al-Fadhel (born 1958) is a Bahraini poet, editor, writer and academic.

== Personal life and education ==
Al-Fadhel was born in 1958, and studied at the University of Essex, completing a doctorate in comparative literature.

She was a Fulbright Scholar during the 1997–1998 academic year.

Al-Fadhel lives in Bahrain and Boston.

== Career ==
She has worked as an assistant professor at the University of Bahrain's department of English since 1994.

In 2013, Al-Fadhel was one of five Bahraini women writers invited to attend a dinner reception with the wife of the Palestinian Ambassador to Bahrain.

She has published numerous short works of literary criticism and analysis and has served on the judging panel of the 2011 Arabic Booker Prize.

== Selected works ==
=== Books (as an author) ===
- Al-Remora, short stories
- For the Voice, For the Fragile Echo, novella (The Brooklyn Rail, 2011)
- Woman, Place and Memory, critical essays on Arab women's writing

=== Book chapters ===
- From localism to cosmopolitanism: a Bahreini perspective, chapter in Cosmopolitanism, Identity and Authenticity in the Middle East (Routledge, 1999) ISBN 978-1-315-02736-4

=== Books (as a co-editor) ===
- Pearl, Dreams of Shell (Howling Dog Press, 2007, ISBN 978-1-882863-79-2), an anthology of modern Bahraini poetry in English translation.

=== Poetry ===
- Namaskar
