= Dorra al-Fazi' =

Tunisian writer

- Born: Tunis
- Citizenship: Tunisia
- Occupations: Novelist, Screenwriter, Lawyer, Academic

Dorra al-Fazi is a Tunisian writer. She was born in Tunis into a literary family; her father is the writer Taher Fazaa. She studied literature at university, followed by further degrees in law.

Dorra won critical acclaim with her first novel Something of the Sea in Us (2020). The novel won the Abdelouahab Ben Ayad Prize. Her second novel I Hide Passion (2022) was nominated for the Arabic Booker Prize.

Dorra also writes screenplays for Arabic-language TV series, such as Destiny, Bolice, and The Days.
