= Mona al-Shammari =

Mona Al-Shamari (born 1966) is a Kuwaiti novelist and writer. She studied theatre and drama at Kuwait University. She started publishing short stories in the late 1980s; in 1990, one of her stories ("The Funeral's Meow") won a prize from the Emirati Writers' Union. Her first collection of stories was published in 2012. Among her novels are No Music in Al Ahmadi, which was adapted for the screen, and The Maids of the Shrine, which was nominated for the Arabic Booker Prize.

Her work has appeared in English translation in Banipal magazine.
