= Doaa Ibrahim =

Egyptian doctor and novelist

- Born: 1988 (age 37–38); Egypt
- Occupations: Pediatrician and Novelist

Doaa Ibrahim (Arabic: دعاء إبراهيم; born 1988) is an Egyptian novelist.

== Education ==
Ibrahim studied Medicine and Surgery at Alexandria University. She has a MA in pediatrics.

== Writing ==
Her novel A Cloud Above My Head (فوق رأسي سحابة), is about a Middle Eastern woman who moves to Japan, with themes on childhood trauma and revenge. It was shortlisted for the 2026 International Prize for Arabic Fiction.
