= Abdennour Mezzine =

Moroccan doctor and writer (born 1965)

Abdennour Mezzine (Arabic: عبد النور مزين; born 1965) is a Moroccan doctor and writer. He was born in the town of Ben Ahmed in northern Morocco. He has been practicing medicine since the 1990s. He started his literary career by publishing French-language poetry in the Al-Ra'i newspaper in Rabat, followed by Arabic short stories that appeared in the Al Ittihad Al Ichtiraki newspaper in Casablanca. He has published a number of books, among them The Mustard Gas Kiss (short stories, 2010), Commandments of the Sea (poetry, 2013) and Letters of the Storm (novel, 2015) which was nominated for the 2016 Arabic Booker Prize.
