= Maqbul Moussa al-Alawi =

Saudi Arabian novelist (born 1968)

Magbool Al-Alawi مقبول موسى العلوي
- Born: 1968 (age 57–58); Saudi Arabia
- Education: Umm al-Qura University
- Occupations: Teacher, Novelist

Maqbul Moussa al-Alawi (Arabic: مقبول موسى العلوي) (born 1968), or Magbool Al-Alawi, is a Saudi Arabian novelist. He graduated from the University College of Mecca (affiliated with Umm al-Qura University) with a BA in Artistic Education and has worked as a teacher.

His first novel Turmoil in Jeddah (2010), a work of historical fiction, was longlisted for the 2011 International Prize for Arabic Fiction. His second novel Love and Transgression (2011) was shortlisted for the Saudi Arabia Novel Award in 2012. His 2019 Seferberlik was longlisted for the 2020 International Prize for Arabic Fiction.
