= Azher Jerjis =

Iraqi writer

- Born: 1973 (age 52–53); Baghdad
- Occupations: Interpreter, editor, writer, journalist

Azher Jerjis is a critically acclaimed Iraqi writer. He is a member of the PEN International society for writers. He was born in Baghdad in 1973 and is currently living in Norway. He has published numerous short works, including fictional stories and newspaper essays, and his novel "al-Nawm fī ḥaql al-karz" (Sleeping in the Cherry Field) was long-listed for the International Prize for Arabic Fiction in 2020.

== Writer's career ==
Since the American invasion of Iraq in 2003, Jerjis has worked as journalist. During this time, he wrote numerous essays and stories that were published in a number of Arabic-language newspapers, both locally and elsewhere in the region. Most of his writings lean towards comedy and black comedy.

He currently works as a cultural editor at the Norwegian newspaper Telemark and as an interpreter between Arabic and Norwegian.

He started writing books in 2005, with his first, "Terror ... earthly hell", a sarcastic book about terrorist militias in Iraq. He has been subjected to an assassination attempt because of the book, which led him to flee from Iraq to Syria, then to Casablanca in Morocco, before settling in the kingdom of Norway.

Azher Jerjis published his first novel, "al-Nawm fī ḥaql al-karz" (Sleeping in the Cherry Field), with Dar Al-Rafidain Printing, Publishing & Distribution in 2019. It got nominated for the long list in the International Prize for Arabic Fiction for the year 2020.

== Works ==
- fawq bilad as-suwad, or Above the Country of Blackness (published by Arab Institute for Research & Publishing, 2015).
- Ṣāniʻ al-ḥalwá, or The Sweetmaker (published by AlMutawassit Books, 2017)
- al-Nawm fī ḥaql al-karz, or Sleeping in the Cherry Field (published by Dar Al-Rafidain, 2019).
