= Aisha Ibrahim (writer) =

Libyan novelist

Aisha Ibrahim (born 1969) (Arabic: عائشة إبراهيم) is a critically-acclaimed Libyan novelist. She was born in Beni Walid in 1969. She studied mathematics and statistics at university and went on to become a teacher, editor, and government worker at the Libyan Ministry of Culture.

She has published three books to-date:

- The World Ends in Tripoli (short story anthology, 2019)
- Qasil (novel, 2016)
- The War of the Gazelle (novel, 2019)

Among her first awards was the State Prize for Students for Theatrical Writing, which she won in 1990. Her most recent novel, The War of the Gazelle, was nominated for the Arabic Booker Prize in 2020. The author has stated that the novel was inspired by the prehistoric rock art of the Tadrart Akakus.
