= Ashraf El-Ashmawi =

Egyptian judge

Ashraf El-Ashmawi (Arabic:أشرف العشماوي) is an Egyptian author, judge and legal scholar. He worked in the public prosecutor's office for many years and served as a judge in the Egyptian court of appeals. More recently, he has worked as legal advisor to the Supreme Council of Antiquities. He has written extensively on crime prevention, including a recent book entitled Legal Thefts: Stories of Thefts of Egyptian Antiquities, Their Smuggling and Attempts to Recover Them.

In 2012, he served as an investigating judge in a case involving illegal foreign funding of Egyptian NGOs.

El-Ashmawi contributes regularly to newspapers and websites, touching on social and political issues as well as more specialized subjects such as the history of Egyptian antiquities. His first two novels were The Time of the Hyenas and Toya. The latter was longlisted for the 2013 Arabic Booker Prize. In 2018, he published the novel Lady of Zamalek, which takes place in Zamalek (a famous district of Cairo).
