= Iman Yehia =

Egyptian physician and writer

Iman Yehia (born 1954) is an Egyptian physician and writer. He was trained as a surgeon in the USSR and now teaches medicine at Suez Canal University. His debut novel Writing with the Scalpel appeared in 2013. His second novel The Mexican Wife (2018) was nominated for the Arabic Booker Prize. He has won the “Sewaris prize” first place for it. He has also translated several works from Russian into Arabic.
