= Saad Mohammed Raheem =

Iraqi writer (1957–2018)

- Saad Mohammed Raheem
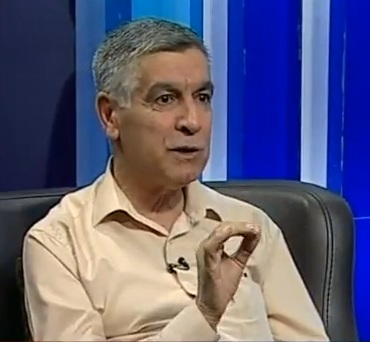
- Born: 1957; Diyala
- Died: April 9, 2018; Sulaymaniyah
- Known for: Award-winning writer

Saad Mohammed Raheem (1957–2018) was an Iraqi writer. He was born in Diyala Governorate in eastern Iraq in 1957. He studied economics at Mustansiriya University, graduating with a bachelor's degree in 1980.

Saad wrote several collections of short stories during his career, among them Almond Blossom (2009) which won the 2010 Creativity Prize for the Short Story. He also published three novels: Twilight of the Wader (2000), which won the 2000 Creativity Award for Fiction, The Song of a Woman, Twilight of the Sea (2012), and The Bookseller's Murder (2016), which was nominated for the Arabic Booker Prize. A well-known journalist in his native Iraq, he won the 2005 Iraqi Award for Best Investigative Journalism.

He died of a stroke in Sulaymaniyah on April 9, 2018.
