= Mekkawi Said =

Egyptian novelist and short story writer

- Born: 6 July 1955; Cairo
- Citizenship: Egypt
- Occupations: Writer, Screenwriter, Novelist

Mekkawi Said (Arabic: مكاوي سعيد; 6 July 1956 – 2 December 2017) was an Egyptian novelist and short story writer.

== Early life ==
He studied at Cairo University. He worked as a scriptwriter and publisher, operating the Al-Dar publishing house in Cairo.

== Career ==
Said published his first book, a collection of short stories, in 1981. Since then, he has published several more short story collections and two novels. His second novel Cairo Swan Song was a bestseller and was nominated for the inaugural Arabic Booker Prize in 2008. The novel has also been translated into English by Adam Talib and published by the AUC Press.

== Awards and honors ==
Said was a recipient of the Egyptian State Prize for Literature.
