= Habib Sayah =

Algerian novelist

Habib Sayah (born 1950) is an Algerian novelist. He studied literature at Oran University, graduating in 1980. He has written ten novels, several of which have been translated into French. He won the Abdelhamid ben Hadouga Prize for the Novel in 2003 and was nominated for the Arabic Booker Prize in 2019.
