= Abdel Wahab al-Hamadi =

Kuwaiti writer (born 1979)

Abdel Wahab al-Hamadi (born 1979) is a Kuwaiti writer. He has written three books till date: Andalusian Paths (travel, 2011), Ababeel Birds (novel, 2012) and Don't Tell Your Nightmare! (novel, 2014). The last-mentioned was nominated for the Arabic Booker Prize in 2015. Al-Hamadi also writes for the Al-Qabas newspaper in Kuwait.
