= Bushra Khalfan =

Omani writer

Bushra Khalfan (born 1969) is an Omani writer. She is mainly known for her short stories, novels and essays. Between 2002 and 2011, she was a columnist for Omani newspapers such as Al-Watan and Al-Ru’ya. At present, she writes for the Oman journal. She is involved with various literary endeavours in Oman, including creative writing workshops, and has also conducted workshops in other Gulf countries, such as Kuwait.

== Life and work ==
In 2022, ArabLit magazine published an interview with Khalfan, where she spoke of her motivation and research for her historical novel Dilshad, her first novel Al-Bagh (The Garden) and the literary scene in Oman.

Her prose collection Dust (2008) was awarded the Omani Writers’ Association Prize, and her second novel Dilshad was shortlisted for the 2022 International Prize for Arabic Fiction, aka the Arabic Booker Prize.
