= Dima Al Shukr =

Syrian writer and translator

Dima al-Shukr (born 1972) is a Syrian writer, critic and translator. She was born in Damascus. Her books on literary criticism include Prosody, Past and Present and Arabic Prosody in the 13th Century (Post Al-Khalil ibn Ahmad). As a translator from French to Arabic, she has translated the work of Régis Debray and Jean-Pierre Filiu. In 2022, her novel Where Is My Name? was nominated for the Arabic Booker Prize.

She lives in Paris.
