= Fatima Abdulhamid =

Saudi Arabian writer (born 1982)

Fatima Abdulhamid (Arabic: فاطمة عبد الحميد; born 1982) is a Saudi Arabian writer. Born in Jeddah, she studied psychology at university and has worked as a teacher and a psychologist. Her books include the short story collection Like a Paper Plane (2010) and several novels. Her 2022 novel The Highest Part of the Horizon was nominated for the Arabic Booker Prize. Her other novels include The Edge of Silver (2013) and F for Female (2016).
