= Reem al-Kamali =

Reem Al-Kamali
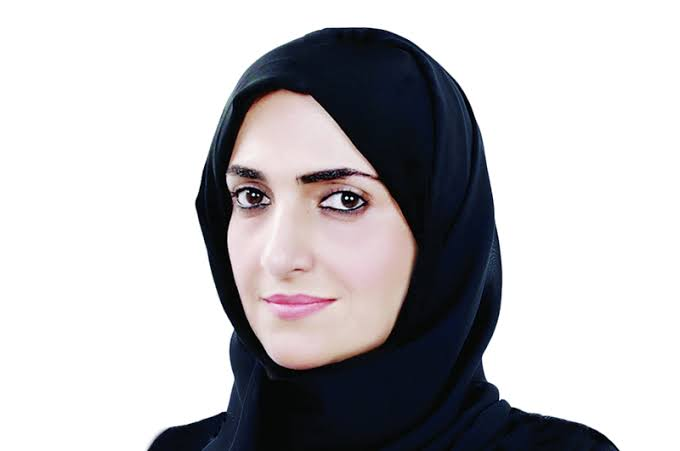
- Born: 1979 (age 46–47)
- Education: Lebanese University (BA)
- Occupations: Author, Journalist
- Children: 2
- Writing career
- Notable work: Rose's Diary
- Notable awards: Al-Owais Creative Award Sheikh Zayed Book Award

Reem Al-Kamali is an Emirati author and journalist. She was born in 1979 in Dubai, United Arab Emirates. She is primarily interested in heritage and ancient languages.

== Biography ==
Al-Kamali completed her high school education in Al-Ittihad School in Dubai. She obtained a Diploma in Social Studies from Al-Ain Scientific College. Then, she went on to obtain her Bachelor's Degree in History from the Lebanese University in Beirut.

She worked as a columnist in Emirati newspapers from 1996-2000. She also worked as an editor for political and cultural columns from 2001-2008. She has been working at Al-Bayan newspaper since 2008, and she works as designer of her cultural column known as 'Masarat.' She has been the newspaper's librarian since 2015.

== Memberships ==
Al-Kamali is a member of various organizations and literary unions, including:

- The Emirati Journalists' Union
- The Emirati Writers' Union
- Al-Owais Creative Award Assembly
- The GCC History and Archeology Association

== Her works ==
- The Sultanate of Hormuz (2013), Owais Prize for Creativity in 2015
- The Statue of Dalma (2018), winner of the Sharjah Award for Arab Creativity
- Rose’s Diary (2021), shortlisted for the Arabic Booker Prize in 2022

== Awards ==
- Al-Owais Creative Award for The Sultanate of Hormuz, 2015
- The Sharjah International Book Fair Best Emirati Book Award for The Statue of Dalma, 2018.
- Her novel, Rose's Diary, was shortlisted for the Poker Award in 2022 and was longlisted for the Sheikh Zayed Book Award for 2021.
