= Mohamed Tawfik =

Egyptian writer

Mohamed Tawfik (born 1956) is an Egyptian novelist, engineer and diplomat. His published works include a trilogy of novels in Arabic:

- One Night in the Life of Abd al-Tawab Tootoo (1996)
- A Naughty Boy Called Antar (2003)
- Candy Girl (2010) (part of the curriculum at American University in Cairo)

He has also published two short story collections and a novella. In English he has published a short story collection The Day the Moon Fell and two novels: Murder in the Tower of Happiness and Candy Girl, translated from Arabic. His 2021 Arabic novel The Whisper of the Scorpion was longlisted for the Arabic Booker Prize.

A longtime diplomat, he served as Egyptian ambassador to Lebanon, to Australia and to the United States.
