= Latif Zeitouni =

Lebanese academic and literary critic

Latif Zeitouni is a Lebanese academic and literary critic. He has two PhDs, one in literature (narratology), and the other in linguistics and translation (the latter from St Joseph's University in Beirut). He is the author of many books and journal papers. He is also an academic translator. Translated works into Arabic include: Questions Générales de Littérature by Emmanuel Fraisse and Bernard Mouralis (2004) and Les Problèmes Théoriques de la Traduction by Georges Mounin (2013). He has served on many judging panels in the Arab world, including that for the Arabic Booker Prize. He teaches narratology at the Lebanese American University in Beirut.

== Selected works ==
- The Translation Movement during the Arab Renaissance (1994)
- The Semiotics of Travel (in French, 1997)
- The Dictionary of Narratology (2002)
- The Arabic Novel: Structure and Narrative Metamorphosis (2012)
- The Novel and Moral Values (2018).
