= Kafa Al-Zou'bi =

Jordanian author

- Born: 1965 (age 60–61); Ar-Ramtha, Jordan
- Occupation: Author
- Awards: Shortlisted for International Prize for Arabic Fiction

Kafa Al-Zou'bi (Arabic: كفى الزعبي, born 1965) is a Jordanian author. Her novel Cold White Sun was shortlisted for the International Prize for Arabic Fiction in 2019.

== Biography ==
Kafa Al-Zou'bi was born in 1965 in Ar-Ramtha, Jordan. She graduated from Ramtha Secondary School for Girls in 1984. She earned a B.Sc. in civil engineering from Leningrad State University in 1992. She lived in St. Petersburg, Russia for a substantial period of time, experiencing the end of the Soviet Union. She left Saint Petersburg in 2006, and now lives in Amman, Jordan, where she works as a journalist as well as a novelist, though she maintains strong ties to both cities.

== Novels ==
Al-Zou'bi has written six novels, five in Arabic and one in Russian. Al-Zou'bi's novels are generally interested in Arab intellectual life and existentialism.

- سقف من طين (Saqf min ṭīn ("A Clay Roof")). Damascus: Arab Writers Union, 2000.
- ليلى والثلج ولودميلا (Laylá wa-al-thalj wa-Lūdmīlā) "Laila, the Snow and Ludmilla")). Beirut: The Arab Institute for Studies and Publishing, 2007. Also published in Russian, Moscow: Admarginen, 2010.
- Go Back Home, Khalil, published only in Russian. Moscow, 2009.
- ابن الحرام (Ibn Al-Harām). Damascus and Beirut: Dār al-Takwīn, 2012.
- س (Sīn ("S")). Damascus: Dār al-Takwīn, 2014.
- شمس بيضاء باردة (Shams Baidha' Baridah ("Cold White Sun")). Beirut: Dar al-Adab, 2018.

=== Reception ===
The novels S and Laila, the Snow and Ludmilla were the subject of a symposium debate between translator Alexander Habash and the novelist Faten Al-Murr at the 2015 Beirut International Book Fair. The discussion focused on interpreting the two novels as potentially feminist texts. The literary critic Ali Hassan Al-Fawaz responded with an article rejecting the premise, describing Al-Zou'bi's writing as transcending simple political interpretations; Al-Zou'bi's novels, he argues, require a reader who will rise to the semiotic challenges of her symbolic writing.

Cold White Sun was shortlisted for the International Prize for Arabic Fiction in 2019. As a shortlisted book, it was one of 6 titles selected from 134 candidates. Being shortlisted comes with a prize of $10,000. Despite this international success, the novel faced censorship in Jordan. In February 2018, the Media Commission forbade circulation of the novel within Jordan and asked distributors to re-export any copies they had in their possession. The Commission declined to give a specific reason for the ban. The novel is about a young intellectual who feels alienated from the conservative society of Amman. Much of the book takes the form of the diary of an old man who was the prior occupant of his windowless room. This narrative raises existential questions about eternity and futility, and the suppression of Arab intellectual culture. The literary critic Walid Abu Bakr described the novel as a combination of the myth of Enkidu in the Epic of Gilgamesh and the myth Sisyphus, contrasting heroic and absurd models of eternity.

Issue 66 of Banipal, the Magazine of Modern Arab Literature takes Al-Zou'bi as its featured author, with an essay on her literary influences, an excerpt of Cold White Sun translated into English, and a review of the novel. This excerpt is the only writing by Al-Zou'bi available in English, as of 2019.
