= Mohammed Abdel Nabi =

Egyptian writer

Mohammed Abdel Nabi (Arabic: محمد عبد النبي; born 1977) is an Egyptian writer. He studied languages at Al-Azhar University.

Abdel Nabi has published books in a number of genres, including short stories, novellas and novels. A freelance translator by profession, Abdel Nabi also runs a creative writing workshop.

== Awards and honors ==
His novel The Return of the Sheikh was nominated for the Arabic Booker Prize. In 2010, his short story collection The Ghost of Anton Chekhov won the Sawiris Literature Prize. His novel In the Spider's Room was shortlisted for the 2017 International Prize for Arabic Fiction.
