= Walid Shurafa =

Palestinian playwright

- Born: 1973 (age 52–53); Palestine
- Education: PhD in Arabic Literature
- Alma mater: University of Birzeit
- Occupations: writer, novelist
- Years active: 1991 - present

Walid Al Shurafa (Arabic: وليد الشرفا) (born 1973) is a Palestinian playwright, novelist, and media studies academic. He was born in Nablus, and now teaches at Birzeit University. Shurafa has published a play, The People's Court (1991), and two novels, Coming from the Resurrection (2013) and Heir of the Tombstones (2017). Heir of the Tombstones was shortlisted for the 2018 International Prize for Arabic Fiction. He is also the author of nonfiction books From Discourse Power to Power of Discourse, on the use of media by Al Jazeera and the Muslim Brotherhood during the Arab Spring uprisings, and Edward Said and Criticism of the Reincarnation of Orientalism, on the representation of Eastern cultures in Western media.

== Works ==
=== Play ===
- The People's Court (Original title: Makamat Al Sha'ab), 1991

=== Novels ===
- Coming from the Resurrection (Original title: Qakem Min Al Qiyama), 2013
- Heir of the Tombstons (Original title: Warth Al Shawahad), 2017
