= Zuheir al-Hiti =

Iraqi writer and journalist

Zuheir al-Hiti (born 1957) is an Iraqi writer and journalist. He has published three novels: My Distant Day (2002), American Dust (2009) and Days of Dust (2016), the last of which was nominated for the Arabic Booker Prize. He has also written a work of literary criticism, The Image of the Iraqi in the Arabic Novel (2006).
