= Ahmed Al-Morsi =

Egyptian writer (born 1992)

Ahmed al-Morsi (born 1992) is an Egyptian writer.

Al-Morsi graduated from Cairo University with a degree in journalism. He has worked for Dream TV and the Rotana media network.

As an author, he has published three novels: What is Left of the Sun (2020), which won the Sawiris Prize in 2021, Written (2021), and Gambling on the Honour of Lady Mitsy (2023), which was nominated for the Arabic Booker Prize in 2024. The plot revolves around horse-racing in Cairo in the early part of the 20th century.
