= Zhor Gourram =

Moroccan academic and novelist

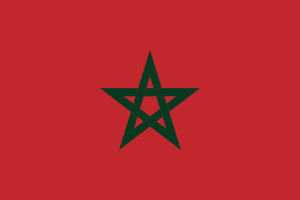
- Born: February 15, 1961 (age 65); Settat
- Citizenship: Morocco
- Occupations: academic, writer
- Awards: Katara Prize for Arabic Fiction

Zhor Gourram also spelled Zuhur Kiram (Arabic: زهور كرام) (15 February 1961, Settat, Morocco) she is a Moroccan novelist, critic, academic and professor of higher education Ibn Tufail University in kenitra, Morocco. She's Head of Scientific Projects and PhD research units, and Head of the language creativity and new media Laboratory.

She is considered one of the most active names in the Moroccan literary scene.

== About her life ==
She holds a state doctorate in the analysis of narrative discourse.

== Memberships ==
She did several memberships including:

- A former member of jury committees, including AL Owais prize, the book prize for the Moroccan Ministry of culture and other jury committees.
- Member of advisory and scientific boards for Moroccan and Arab magazines. Member of the committees of reading manuscripts for Moroccan and Arab publishing houses.
- An organization of Arab and international conferences and symposia.

== Awards ==
- She received the royal Moroccan sash (national Efficiency) among 14 Moroccan and International personalities in 2012 at the Casablanca International Book Fair.
- Katara Prize for Arabic Novel, in the critical studies Branch for the year 2016, for the study "Towards Awareness of the Transformations of the Arab Narrative Narrative".
- Nominated for Sheikh Zayed Book Prize in 2021, in the category "Art and Critical Studies".

== Works ==
- Mahdi Elmandjra : le futurologue marocain, 2019, Casablanca, Centre Culturel du Livre, ISBN 978-9920-975018--8
- A Body and a City, Dar and Leila, 1996
- Travel in Man, Al-Bukili Publications, 1998
- In the Hospitality of Censorship, Time Publications, 2001
- Carnation necklace, House of culture, 2004
- Bibliography of Maghreb innovators, Dar Al-Aman, in partnership with Dr. Muhammad Qasimi, 2006
- The Birth of the Soul, Publications of the Short Story Research Group, 2008
- The speech of the gods of narcotics, "An Approach to the Arab and Moroccan Women's Speech", Roya Publishing and Distribution, 2009
- Digital Literature "Cultural Questions and Conceptual Reflections", Vision for Publishing and Distribution, 2009
- The Arabic Novel and the Time of Formation from a Contextual Perspective, Arab House for Science Publishers, 2012
- Future Enlightenment Thought on Curriculum, Dar Al-Aman for Publishing and Distribution, 2018
- The Enlightenment Thought of Al-Mahdi Al-Manjar, New Dilmun House, 2019
- Humanities and Digital in the Post-Corona Era, Spaces for Publishing and Distribution, 2020

== Publications about her ==
- "The Sedition of Creativity and the Critical Question in the Experience of Zuhour Karam" issued by the Moroccan Institution of Approaches to Publishing, presented by Said Yaktine.
