= Mohammed Abi Samra =

Lebanese journalist and novelist

Mohammed Abi Samra (born 1953) is a Lebanese journalist and novelist. He studied at the Lebanese University, and has been a cultural journalist at leading Arabic publications such as Al-Safir, Al-Nahar and Al-Hayat. His novels include:

- Pauline and Her Ghosts (1990)
- The Former Man (1995)
- Inhabitants of the Pictures (2003)
- Women Without Influence (2017)
- Women Without Trace (2019)

Women Without Trace was nominated for the Arabic Booker Prize.
