= Jana Elhassan =

Lebanese novelist and short story writer

Jana Elhassan (Arabic: جنى الحسن; born 1985) is a Lebanese award-winning novelist and short story writer from Lebanon. She has worked as a newspaper journalist and television writer since 2008.

Elhassan was born in Btouratij, Koura District. Her first novel Forbidden Desires won the Simon Hayek Award, and both her second novel, Me, She and Other Women, and third novel, Ninety Ninth Floor, were shortlisted for the International Prize of Arabic Fiction. Her third novel was the first to be translated into English. Both the shortlisted novels are translated into Italian.

In 2015, Elhassan was listed among the BBC's 100 women, a two-week season program featuring inspiring women around the world.
