= Qasim Tawfiq =

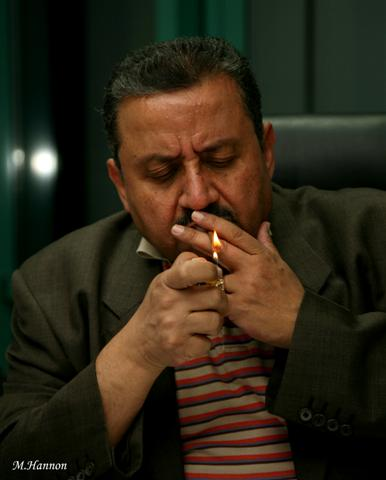
- Born: Qasim Muhammad Tawfiq Al-Hajj; January 27, 1954 (age 72); Jenin, Palestine
- Notable work: Mary Rose Crossing the City of the Sun, A More Beautiful Land, Amman, One Last Return, Al Shindagha Novel, Stories of Peace, Oman, Peace, O Star, Stories of the Lover.

Qasim Tawfiq is a Jordanian novelist and short story writer. He spent his childhood and youth and is still residing in Amman, studied in its schools, and completed his university education at the University of Jordan. He graduated with a BA in Literature. He worked in the banking sector since graduating from the University of Jordan in several Arab countries and the world until he retired to devote himself to his literary project, the novel, in 2013 as an assistant general manager in a Jordanian bank.

== His life ==
He began writing in 1974, publishing several short stories in Jordanian and Arab newspapers and magazines. He published his first collection of short stories while studying at the University of Jordan, entitled It Is Time for Us to Rejoice, in 1977. His name emerged in the world of literature locally and in the Arab world with the publication of his first novel, Mary Rose Crossing the City of the Sun, which received broad responses for its creativity at the subject and text level; the novel was reprinted in 2007 in Ramallah, Palestine, by Shepherd House, and its third edition was issued in Amman 2010. He won the Katara Prize for Arabic Fiction in 2018 for his novel Bleeding of the Little Bird, which was translated into English and released in 2019 by Katara.

Qasim Tawfiq is considered the first to write about Amman, unlike what was prevalent among most Jordanian writers who were heading to "the nowhere" in their writings.

== Literary biography ==
Many studies, books, doctoral and master theses have dealt with the literature of Qasim Tawfiq, whose authors reveal Qasim Tawfiq's literary and human capabilities, including:

1 - The Book “Narrative Philosophy - A Critical Approach to the Dynamics” of Narrative Expression by Qasim Tawfiq, by Dr. Muhammad Saber Obaid, Dar Ghaida Publishing, Amman - Jordan, 2015.

2 - Book “The Black Pearl” Secrets of the Narrative Treasure in the Imaginary of Qasim Tawfiq, Dialogue Encounters with Qasim Tawfiq, moderated by Dr. Muhammad Saber Obaid, Ghaida Publishing House, Amman-Jordan, 2015. This book is a long dialogue with Qasim Tawfiq that reveals a significant part of his biography. Own.

3- “Roots of the Existential Current”,The Novel "Mary Rose Crosses the City of the Sun," the book "The Obsessions of the Jordanian Novel," Dr. Suleiman Al-Azra'i, now publishers and distributors, Amman - Jordan, 2015.

4 – “National Dreams and Human Aspirations - "Al-Shindagha,"” the book "The Obsessions of the Jordanian Novel" by Dr. Suleiman Al-Azra'i, now publishers and distributors, Amman - Jordan, 2015.

5- Documenting the folklore - the novel "Mary Rose Crosses the City of the Sun," the book "The Obsessions of the Jordanian Novel," Dr. Suleiman Al-Azra'i, now publishers and distributors, Amman - Jordan, 2015.

6 - "Al-Shindagha" unity in plurality - A book intrusive into narration, Hamid Saeed, Tala Publishing House, Syria, 2010.

7 - Parallel Narrator and Lover Narrator - The Novel "A Tale Named Love," Muhammad Mutasim, Morocco's Swinging Website.

8 - "The Smell of Bitter Almonds" as a Freudian Laboratory, Dr. Ghassan Ismail Abdel Khaleq, Al Jasra Al Thaqafia.

9 - Novel "Noisy" - Awareness of the Novel and Novel of Consciousness... A Socio-textual Approach, Dr. Ibrahim Mustafa Al-Hamad, Tikrit University.

10 - The Introductory Narrative Formation - A Study in the Novel "Shuck," Prof. Dr. Falih Mudhi Al-Samarrai, Al-Madina International University, Shah Alam, Malaysia.

11- The presence of the character of Al-Masry in the novel "A Tavern Above the Dust," Dr. Faten Al-Hayani, Al-Ra'i Jordanian newspaper, December 2015.

12 – “Personality formation and event mirrors” a reading of the novels of Qasim Tawfiq, Dr. Muhammad Saber Obaid, Jordanian Afkar magazine, No. 312.

13 - The book “Components of Novelist Discourse” A Reading of Qasim Tawfiq's Novelistic Experience, Prof. Dr. Sawsan Al-Bayati, University of Mosul, 2016.

14 - Dismantling the awareness of the female self of her identity and the other, including or excluding, in the novel “Hustle”, Prof. Dr. Nadia Hanawi Saadoun, manuscript.

15 - Reading in the novel "A Tale called Love" by Dr. Dalal Al-Antawi, a civilized dialogue site.

16 - Book of “the novelist experience of Qasim Tawfiq”. A group of Arab critics and professors (nine studies). Prepared, presented, and shared by Dr. Khalil Hayas. Ghaida Publishing House. Amman. Jordan 2018.

== Ph.D. and MA theses specialized in the literature of Qasim Tawfiq ==
• Qasim Tawfiq as a novelist, master's thesis, student Nisreen Al-Rawashdeh, Mutah University, Jordan, 2011.

• Manifestations of the body in the novels of Qasim Tawfiq, Ph.D. thesis in Arabic literature, student Musa Abd Darb Al-Jubouri, University of Mosul, Iraq, 2017.

• Techniques of Narrative Narrative - A Study in the Novels of Qasim Tawfiq, Ph.D. thesis in Arabic literature, student Kosubi Issa, Al-Madinah International University, Malaysia. (in progress).

• Types of characters in the novel "Frodmal" by Qasim Tawfik. Master's thesis student Ali Ayden. Tikrit University. Iraq, 2018.

• The narrative language of Qasim Tawfiq - (boldness, stylistics, symbolism). Meaning enough. Supervision of Prof. Dr. Muhammad Shereen Chakar. Ankara University, Turkey.

== Novels ==
- “Mary rose Tabur Madeenat Alshams” (Marie Rose Crossing the City of the Sun), Beirut, 1985.
- “Ard Akthar Jamalan” (A More Beautiful Land), Beirut, 1987.
- “Amman Wardun Akheer” (Amman, a recent reply), Beirut, 1992.
- “Warakat Altoot” (The Raspberry Paper), Cairo, 2000.
- ”Al Shindagha”, Ramallah, 2006.
- “Hikayat Ismuha Alhub” (A story called Love), Ramallah, 2009.
- “Albox” (Box), Amman, 2012.
- “Raihat Allawz Allmmur” (The smell of bitter almonds), Amman, 2014.
- “Sakhab” (Bustle), Beirut, 2015.
- “Hana Fawka Alturab” (Pub above the dirt), Amman, 2015.
- ”Frodemal”, Amman, 2016.
- “Nazeef Altaer Alsageer”(Bleeding the Little Bird), Beirut 2017.
- “Mira”. Amman. 2018.
- “Nasheed Alrajul Alttayeb” (Praise the good man). Beirut, Cairo, Algeria, 2020

Short stories

- "It is time for us to rejoice", Amman, 1977.
- "Introductions to the Time of War", Beirut, 1980.
- "Peace, Amman, Peace, Star", Beirut, 1982.
- "Al-Asheq", Amman, 1987.
- "Dhul-Qarnayn", Amman, 2009.

Important note: Qasim Tawfiq has provided electronic copies of most of his novels for free through his official website

Official Website:https://www.qasemtawfiq.com
