= Marwan al-Ghafory =

Yemeni novelist and writer

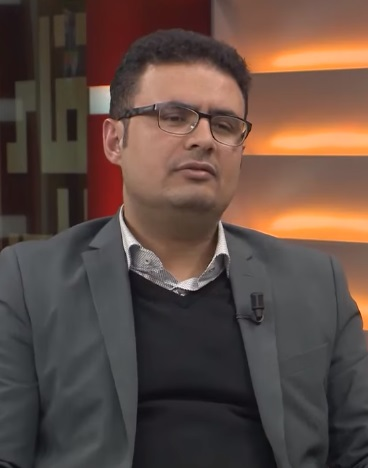
- Marwan al-Ghafory on 15 February 2015
- Born: 1980 (age 45–46); Taiz Governorate, Yemen
- Occupations: Novelist, writer, cardiologist

Marwan Ahmed al-Ghafory (Arabic: مروان الغفوري, born in 1980) is a Yemeni novelist, writer and cardiologist. He has been based in Germany since 2011. He has published many literary books and was awarded Sharjah Prize for Arab Creativity for his poetry work entitled, Layal, (Nights), in 2005. He is known for his political articles.

== Early life and education ==
Al-Ghafory was born in 1980 in Taiz Governorate. Marwan grew up and studied his basic education in Taiz, Yemen. In 1998 Marwan got a scholarship from the government to pursue higher studies in Egypt. He obtained a bachelor in medicine from Ain Shams University Faculty of Medicine in 2006. Then he received a master in Cardiovascular Medicine from Cairo University in 2009. Marwan left to Germany in 2011 and obtained a certificate of specialization in 2016. He has been working there as cardiologist since then. He also writes in many local and international newspapers.

== Publications ==
=== Poetry ===
- Layal (Nights), 2004

=== Novels ===
- Waiting for the Prophecy of Yathrib, 2006
- Code Blue, 2008
- Al-Khazraji, 2013
- Jada’eel Saada, 2014
- Taghribet Mansour Al-Araj, 2015.

== Awards ==
- Sharjah Prize for Arab Creativity for his poetry work, Layal, (Nights), 2005
- Dar Naji Nouman Award for his poetry work, Moden fy Na'al El-Mushah, “Cities in Pedestrian Slippers", 2008
