= Ahmed al-Madini =

Moroccan scholar, novelist, poet and translator

Ahmed el-Madini (Arabic:أحمد المديني) is a scholar, a novelist, a poet, and a translator from Morocco.

== Bibliography ==
Benmarek Mariam, An annotated translation of five short stories of the Moroccan writer Ahmad Al madini, 2005

Novels:

- Al’unfu fid Dimagh (العنف في الدماغ)
- Al-Janaza, (الجنازة)
- Ihtimalat Al-Balad Al-Azraq (احتمالات البلد الأزرق)
- Ro’ya Seen (رؤية سين)

Poetry Collections:

- Bardul Masafat (برد المسافات)
- Andalus Al-Raghba (أندلس الرغبة)
- Baqaya Gheyab (بقايا غياب)
