= List of Arabic short story writers =

This is a list of story writers in Arabic and short story writers from Arab world.

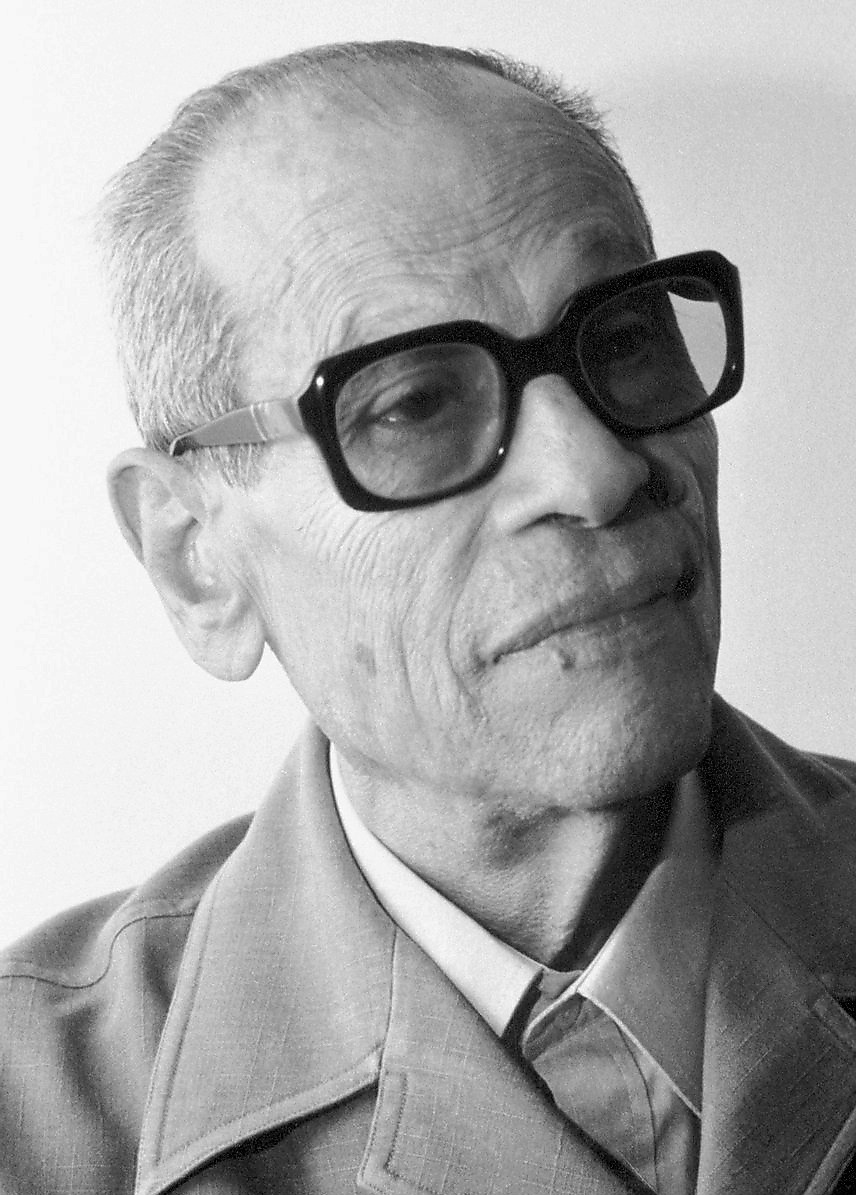
Naguib Mahfouz

== A ==
- Zain Abdul-Hadi
- Samir abdul-Fattah
- Mohammad Al-Azab
- Yosuf al-Alamy
- Osama Alomar
- Alaa Al Aswany
- Muhammad Aladdin
- Tawfiq Yusuf 'Awwad
- Fatimah Yousif al-Ali
- Wasino Al-Araj
- Ibtisam Abdallah
- Rabi' Alamoddin
- Leila Abu al-Ela
- Lana Abdel Rahman

== B ==
- Liana Badr
- Ali Bader
- Idris Ali
- Ibrahim Aslan
- Salwa Bakr
- Mohammad al-Bisatie
- Latifa Baka
- Abdul-Majid Ben Jalloun
- Mohammed Berrada
- Ahmed Bouzfour
- Hassan Blasim
- Ya'qub Bilbul
- Badryah El-Bishr
- Issa J. Boullata
- Khalil Beidas
- Abdallah Salim Bawazir
- Bahiya Bubsit

== C ==
- Mohamed Choukri

== D ==
- Izzat Darwaza
- Jabbour Douaihy
- Nasser al-Dhaheri
- Hassan Daoud

== E ==
- Tarek Emam
- Mansour Eid

== G ==
- Hamdi Abu Golayyel
- Ali Ghadeer
- Abdelkrim Ghallab

== H ==
- Emile Habibi
- Rosa Yaseen Hasan
- Muhammad Husayn Haykal
- Tawfiq al-Hakim
- Yahya Haqqi
- Renée Hayek
- Abdelhamid ben Hadouga
- Anwar Hamed
- Jokha al-Harthi

== I ==
- Yusuf Idris

== J ==
- Kahlil Gibran
- Sara al-Jarwan
- Laila al-Juhani

== K ==
- Ghassan Kanafani
- Edwar al-Kharrat
- Driss El Khouri
- Umaima al-Khamis
- Ziad Khaddash

== L ==
- Mohammed Lotfy Gomaa

== M ==
- Rabai al-Madhoun
- Naguib Mahfouz
- Mohamed Makhzangi
- Mohamed Mustagab
- Mohammad Al Murr
- Hassan Mutlak
- Mustafa Lutfi al-Manfaluti
- Muhammad Abdallah Muthanna
- Ali El-Maak
- Yousef Al-Mohaimeed
- Muhammed Abu Maatouk
- Razan Naiem Almoghrabi
- Bashir Mufti
- Fatin al-Murr

== N ==
- Nesma Idris
- Emily Nasrallah
- Jamal Naji

== O ==
- Laila al-Ouhaydib
- Omar Ben Salem

== Q ==
- Mohamed Mansi Qandil

== R ==
- Mahmoud al-Rimawy
- Somaya Ramadan
- Yusuf Abu Rayya
- Muhsin al-Ramli
- Mubarak Rabi
- Mohamed Said Raihani
- Alifa Rifaat

== S ==
- Habib Selmi
- Mekkawi Said
- Ibtihal Salem
- Driss Seghir
- Abdelhak Serhane
- Ghada al-Samman
- Anton Shammas
- Habib Abdulrab Sarori
- Hanan al-Shaykh
- Mohammad Shaheen
- Salah Abu Seif
- Saud Alsanousi
- Alawiya Sobh
- Amina Said

== T ==
- Miral al-Tahawy
- Sahar Tawfiq
- May Telmissany
- Zakaria Tamer
- Ibtisam Ibrahim Teresa
- May Telmissany

== W ==
- Dima Wannous

== Y ==
- Samar Yazbek
- Yahya Yakhlif

== Z ==
- Amina Zaydan
- Mohamed Zafzaf
- Ibrahim al-Zaarur

== See also ==
- Arabic literature
- Arabic short story
