= Yamani =

Yamani, Al-Yamani or El Yamani (Arabic: "from Yemen") may refer to:

== Al-Yamani ==
- Al-Yamani (Shiism), a pre-messianic figure in Shia Islamic eschatology
  - Ahmad al-Hasan al-Yamani, a Basra Shia Iraqi who in the 2000s claimed to be the messenger of the Imam Mahdi
- al-Mu'allimi, known as al-Mu'allimi al-Yamani, Yemeni Islamic scholar
- Issam Al Yamani, Palestinian in Canada
- Khaled al-Yamani, Yemeni politician
- Mokhtar Al-Yamani; Yemeni swimmer
- Saeed Al Yamani, Bahraini academic
- Umara al-Yamani, Yemenite Sunni historian

== El Yamani ==
- Ayman El Yamani, Egyptian football player and manager
- Khalil El-Yamani, Moroccan basketball player
- Mohamed El Yamani, Egyptian footballer

== Yamani ==
- Ahmad Yamani, Egyptian poet
- Ahmed Zaki Yamani, Saudi Arabian politician and petroleum and mineral minister
- Bakhshat Yamani, village in Saudi Arabia
- Kazuhisa Yamani, Japanese rower
- Mai Yamani, Saudi scholar
- Yamani Hafez Musa, Malaysian politician
- Yamani Saied, Panamanian model
