= International Prize for Arabic Fiction Nadwa =

Writers' workshop

The International Prize for Arabic Fiction Nadwa is an annual writers' workshop for young writers from the Arab world. Held under the aegis of the International Prize for Arabic Fiction (itself funded by the Emirates Foundation in Abu Dhabi), the nadwa is the first such workshop for Arab writers and has been an annual event since 2009.

The nadwa (Arabic: ندوة; 'assembly', 'symposium') benefits from the patronage of the Emirati prince Sheikh Hamdan bin Zayed Al-Nahyan, and takes place at the Qasr Al Sarab resort in Abu Dhabi.

The small group of emerging writers is accompanied and assisted by two established authors who work as their "mentors". The literary output of the first workshop was collected and published in a volume called Emerging Arab Voices (Saqi Books, London 2011).

The coordinator of the nadwa was Dr Peter Clark in 2009 and 2010 and Fleur Montanaro in 2011.

== Participants ==
=== 2009 ===
- Lana Abdel Rahman, Lebanon/Egypt
- Mansour El Souwaim, Sudan
- Mansoura Ez Eldin, Egypt
- Mohammed Hasan Alwan, Saudi Arabia
- Nadia Alkokabani, Yemen
- Kamel Riahi, Tunisia
- Mohamed Salah El Azab, Egypt
- Nasser al-Dhaheri, UAE

Mentors

- Jabbour Douaihy, Lebanon
- Inaam Kachachi, Iraq

=== 2010 ===
- Wajdi al-Ahdal, Yemen
- Mariam Al Saedi, UAE
- Akram Msallam, Palestine
- Rania Mamoun, Sudan
- Anis Arrafai, Morocco
- Lina Hawyana al-Hasan, Syria
- Tareq Emam, Egypt

Mentors:

- Jabbour Douaihy, Lebanon
- Mansoura Ez Eldin, Egypt

=== 2011 ===
- Ali Ghadeer, Iraq
- Jokha al-Harthi, Oman
- Mahmoud al-Rahby, Oman
- Mohamed ould Mohamed Salem, Mauritania
- Muhsin Suleiman, UAE
- Rasha al-Atrash, Lebanon
- Sara Abd al-Wehab al-Drees, Kuwait
- Waleed Abdulla Hashim, Bahrain

Mentors:

- Mansoura Ez Eldin, Egypt
- Amir Tag Elsir, Sudan

=== 2012 ===
- Huda al-Attas, Yemen
- Sara al-Jarwan, UAE
- Charbel Kattan, Lebanon
- Waleed Ouda, Palestine
- Mohammad Rabie, Egypt
- Ahmed Saadawi, Iraq

Mentors:

- Inaam Kachachi, Iraq
- Amir Tag Elsir, Sudan

=== 2013 ===
- Ayman Otoom (Jordan)
- Hicham Benchchaoui (Morocco)
- Samir Kacimi (Algeria)
- Noha Mahmoud (Egypt)
- Lulwah al-Mansuri (UAE)
- Bushra al-Maqtari (Yemen)
- Abdullah Mohammed Alobaid (Saudi Arabia)
- Nasrin Trabulsi (Syria)

Mentors:

- Mohammed Achaari (Morocco)
- May Menassa (Lebanon)

=== 2019 ===
- Eman Al Yousuf
- Wiam Al Madadi
- Laila Abdullah
- Salha Obeid
- Mamoun Sharaa
- Yasmin Haj
- Hasan Akram

Mentors:

- Muhsin Al-Ramli
- Iman Humaydan

== See also ==
- Beirut 39
