= Beirut39 =

List of Arab writers under age 39

Beirut39 is a collaborative project between the Hay Festival, Beirut UNESCO's World Book Capital 2009 celebrations, Banipal magazine and the British Council among others in order to identify 39 of the most promising Arab writers under the age of 39. The project was carried out during 2009-10 and followed on the success of Bogotá39, an earlier contest held in 2007 to identify the most promising young Latin American writers. In connection with Port Harcourt being World Book Capital 2014, Africa39 was launched by the Hay Festival, featuring 39 writers under the age of 40 from sub-Saharan Africa.

Beirut39's requirements for eligibity stipulated that the author be born in or after 1970, be of Arab heritage and have at least one publication. The judges for the contest included Egyptian literary critic Gaber Asfour, Lebanese poet and journalist Abdo Wazen, Lebanese writer Alawiya Sobh and Omani poet and journalist Saif Al Rahbi. The project resulted in a literary anthology called Beirut39: New Writing from the Arab World, edited by Samuel Shimon of Banipal magazine and published by Bloomsbury in 2010.

== The list ==
- Morocco – Abdelaziz Errachidi (born 1978)
- Netherlands – Abdelkader Benali (born 1975)
- Morocco – Abdellah Taïa (born 1973)
- Morocco – Abderrahim Elkhassar (born 1975)
- Algeria – Abderrazak Boukebba (born 1977)
- Saudi Arabia – Abdullah Thabit (born 1973)
- Palestine – Adania Shibli (born 1974)
- Iraq – Ahmad Saadawi (born 1973)
- Egypt – Ahmad Yamani (born 1970)
- Palestine – Ala Hlehel (born 1974)
- Iraq – Bassim al Ansar (born 1970)
- Syria – Dima Wannous (born 1982)
- France – Faïza Guène (born 1985)
- Lebanon – Hala Kawtharani (born 1977)
- Egypt – Hamdy el Gazzar (born 1970)
- Oman – Hussein al Abri (born 1972)
- Jordan – Hussein Jelaad (born 1970)
- Lebanon – Hyam Yared (born 1975)
- Jordan – Islam Samhan (born 1982)
- Lebanon – Joumana Haddad (born 1970)
- Tunisia – Kamel Riahi (born 1974)
- Sudan – Mansour El Souwaim (born 1970)
- Egypt – Mansoura Ez Eldin (born 1976)
- Saudi Arabia – Mohammad Hassan Alwan (born 1979)
- Egypt – Mohammad Salah al Azab (born 1981)
- Egypt – Nagat Ali (born 1975)
- Libya – Najwa Binshatwan (born 1970)
- Palestine – Najwan Darwish (born 1978)
- Lebanon – Nazem El Sayed (born 1975)
- Lebanon – Rabee Jaber (born 1972)
- USA – Randa Jarrar (born 1978)
- Syria – Rosa Yassin Hassan (born 1974)
- Syria – Samar Yezbek (born 1970)
- Lebanon – Samer Abou Hawwash (born 1972)
- Yemen – Wajdi al Ahdal (born 1973)
- Saudi Arabia – Yahya Amqassim (born 1971)
- Morocco – Yassin Adnan (born 1970)
- Egypt – Youssef Rakha (born 1976)
- Lebanon – Zaki Baydoun (born 1981)

== See also ==
- Granta magazine's list Best of Young British Novelists
- IPAF Nadwa
