= Madadi =

Madadi is a surname. Notable people with the name include:

- Ahmad Madadi (born 1994), Qatari handball player
- Chaitanya Rao Madadi (born 1989), Indian actor in Telugu cinema
- Hamad Madadi (born 1988), Iranian-born Qatari handball player
- Mohammad Ali Madadi (born 1959), Iranian politician
- Moses Obimbo Madadi, Kenyan clinician, scientist, researcher, and educator
- Reza Madadi (born 1978), Iranian-Swedish mixed martial artist
- Wiam Al Madadi (born 1989), Moroccan writer

== See also ==
- Mana Mecchida Madadi, a 1963 Indian Kannada-language film
