= Yared (surname) =

Yared is a variation of the surname Jared, a given name. Notable people with the surname include:

- Gabriel Yared, a Lebanese-French composer
- Petra Yared, an Australian actress
- Marlon Yared, a Brazilian volleyball player
- Christiane Yared, a Brazilian politician
- Pierre Yared, a Lebanese-American economist
- Nazik Yared, a Lebanese novelist and academist
- Hyam Yared, a Lebanese writer

== See also ==
- Yared, an Ethiopian composer in the 6th century.
