= Nahla Karam =

Egyptian writer

- Born: 1989 (age 36–37); Cairo
- Education: University of Cairo
- Occupation: Author
- Writing career
- Language: Arabic
- Notable awards: Sawiris award

Nahla Karam is an Egyptian writer born in 1989 in Cairo. She graduated from the University of Cairo, school of media in 2010, and published multiple works including: "To hang in the air" by Al-Tanweer publishing house in 2013, "Death wants me to accept his apology" by Al-Ain publishing house in 2017, "On Freud's couch" by Al-Thaqafa Al-Jadeedah publishing house in 2015 and "Backseats" by the Egyptian-Lebanese publishing house.

== About the writer ==
Nahla Karam's "To Hang in the Air", was her first story collection published in 2013. Her story, "Tale from the Back Lines" was one of the winning stories in the "Goethe" Centre workshop where she won a trip to the Frankfurt Book Fair, and her novel, "On Freud’s Couch" was shortlisted for the Sawiris Prize in 2015. The story featured here comes from her latest collection, published in 2017. In 2019 Nahla Karam wrote a short documentary film named "Karakeeb" directed by Ahmed Nader that talks about the Egyptian culture around "clutter" and why Egyptians keep so much stuff in their houses. Nahla talks about various topics in her books such as toxic relationships and why people, especially women, enter such relationships and have difficulty getting out.

== Published work ==
- "To hang in the air" by Al-Tanweer publishing house in 2013
- "Death wants me to accept his apology" by Al-Ain publishing house in 2017
- "On Freud's couch" by Al-Thaqafa Al-Jadeedah publishing house in 2015
- "Backseats" published by the Egyptian-Lebanese publishing house
- The Book of Cairo: A City in Short Fiction, Published 16 June 2019 by Comma Press
- The flamingo trick, published by the Egyptian-Lebanese publishing house

== Awards ==
- "On Freud’s Couch" was shortlisted for the Sawiris Prize in 2015.
