= Ahmad Al Mallawani =

Ahmed Al-Malawani
- Born: 23 August 1980 (age 46); Alexandria
- Occupations: Writer, playwright and novelist

Ahmed Al-Malawani is an Egyptian writer, playwright and novelist.

== Early life and education ==
He was born in the city of Alexandria, and graduated from Alexandria University in 2001.

== Career ==
He began his literary career in 2007 by publishing in websites, magazines, and cultural and literary newspapers. He joined the literary hospice group in 2008. He was awarded the Nabil Farouk Prize for Science Fiction Literature in 2009. He published his first novel, Zeus Must Die in 2010 as part of the "Hospice Editions" series. In 2011, he won the award of the Egyptian Cultural Palaces Authority given to young people in Egypt for his short story collection A Rusty Sword and an Explosive Belt, which was published in a book in 2013 by Dar Sama Al-Kuwaiti. In the same year, he published another collection of short stories entitled "The Hashish Crisis".

In 2014, he released his second novel, Introducing the Resurrection, and won for the second time the Egyptian Culture Palaces Award for an unpublished novel entitled Shadow of Satan. In 2015, he issued a collection of horror stories entitled "The Spiritual" for the publishing house Juice al-Kutub, and the number of its eight editions exceeded in less than a year. He won other awards, including the Akhbar Newspaper Award for the novel A Strawberry Rose, and the Cultural Award of the Sawiris Foundation for Social Development in its fourteenth session in the branch of the best fiction work for young writers, for his novel Al-Fabrikah issued by the Egyptian House. Lebanese.

Al-Malwani decided to write drama, and presents himself as a comic playwright through his work in the fourth season of the “Teatro Egypt” program between 2016 and 2017.

== His writings ==
- «Zeus Must Die», a novel, Dar Aktub for Publishing and Distribution, 2012, number of pages: 240.
- Beating the Dead”, a translated play, 2009, number of pages: 173.
- “What looks like murder”, a novel, The Egyptian Lebanese House, 2020, number of pages: 256.
- "Wardiyat Strawberry", Dar Al-Masry for Publishing and Distribution, 2016.
- “The Cannabis Crisis, a short story collection”, a novel, Al-Asriya for Publishing and Distribution, 2013.
- “Al-Rouhani, a collection of short stories”, Asir Al-Kutub for Publishing and Distribution, 2015.
- “Opening for Resurrection”, a novel, fantasy, 2014.
- “A rusty sword and an explosive belt, a collection of short stories”, Dar Sama / Kuwait, 2013.
- "Al-Fabrikah", a novel, the Egyptian Lebanese House, 2017, pages: 415.

Drama

- “Theatro Egypt” season four, 2016.
- "Shash fi Qattan series", 2017 (Author)
- “A comfortable Passport” play, 2019 (Author).
- “The Al-Fakari Family Play”, 2020 (Author).

== Awards ==
- 2009 Nabil Farouk Prize for Science Fiction Literature, first place.
- 2011 Second place in the central competition of the General Authority for Cultural Palaces, the section of the short story collection for the group (rusty sword... and an explosive belt).
- 2013 Salah Hilal Prize for Short Story. Second place.
- 2014 Third place in the Central Competition of the General Authority for Cultural Palaces, Novel Branch, for the novel (Shadow of Satan).
- 2015 Ihsan Abdul Quddus Salon Award. First place, short story.
- 2015 Literary News Award, Novel Branch, first place, for the novel (Strawberry Pink).
- 2015 Third place in the Talent Competition - the Supreme Council of Culture - Story Collection Branch.
- 2015 Second place in the Rabie Muftah Prize for Fiction - for the novel (Futtahir for the Resurrection).
- 2019 Sawiris Cultural Prize - first place, for the novel (Al-Fabrikah).
- 2019 Cairo Show Award for Theatrical Script, second place, for the play (Aa El Hawa).
