= Nesma =

Nesma may refer to:

== Given name ==
- Nesma Idris (born 1970), Egyptian short story writer
- Nesma Mahgoub (born 1989), Egyptian singer and actress
- Angelli Nesma Medina, Mexican producer

== See also ==
- Nesma Airlines, Egyptian airline and subsidiary
