= Arab speculative fiction =

Literary genre

Arab speculative fiction is speculative fiction written by writers of Arab descent, whether it is written in Arabic or other languages. Arab writers in this genre have been active both inside the Arab world and in the Arab diaspora. One prominent example is Amal El-Mohtar, a Canadian of Lebanese descent, who has won the prestigious Hugo and Nebula awards.

== Themes ==
Arab speculative fiction commonly portrays themes of repression, cyclical violence, and the concept of a utopia long lost by years of destruction. Arab-American speculative fiction is portrayed through the involvement of the United States in the country-specific subgenres of Arabic speculative fiction. Culture specific subgenres have their own distinct themes from one another characterized by the experiences of those within their respective states. Two such states, the land referred to as Palestine, and Egypt, each have themes specific to their individual histories and cultural experiences. Examples of themes in Palestinian speculative fiction include settler occupation, lost futures, and stoicism in the face of opposition, while themes in Egyptian speculative fiction include militant governments, repressed uprisings, and totalitarianism.

== Palestinian speculative fiction ==
Palestinian speculative fiction if a sub-genre of Arabic speculative fiction written through the lens of a people experiencing settler occupation after the State of Israel was established in 1948, along with the concurrent effort to expel Palestinians from the claimed land, called Nakba.

This sub-genre includes different mediums of expression, including art, film, and literature. The works focus on a range of futures for Palestine, some tied to the permanent damage and trauma done to Palestinian land and its people, such as Tarzan and Arab's short film Condom Lead, which portrays a Palestinian family trapped underneath a 22-day-long Israeli assault, with depictions of troubled childcare, anxiety, and deprivation of sexual pleasure. Other speculate Palestinian futures rendered impossible by the reality of the present, as a way to call attention to current issues and events like Rabah's The Palestinian Museum of Natural History, a conceptual exhibit. That exhibit is an exercise in the purpose and execution of museums, depicting a land and culture whose legitimacy is questioned.

Amongst the themes present in Palestinian speculative fiction, there is the concept and practice of Sumūd, which is a uniquely Palestinian form of stoicism, and in Palestinian speculative fiction, portrays a form of rebellion in the act of endurance and perseverance in the face of constant struggle. This passive resistance is the effort to fend off the erasure of Palestinian knowledge and cultural norms that comes with the acknowledgement that systemic destruction of the Palestinian people is a possibility. This concept is present in Shibli's novella Masās, which depicts the third-person perspective of an unnamed Palestinian girl's life, who interprets her overwhelming surroundings through colors. As she grows, she takes in the major and minute details of her surroundings, becoming resolute in the instability of her home and life by the time she's married at the end of the novel.

Themes of Palestinian and cultural destruction have multiple levels, one of which being the act of Palestinian reproduction, and the deprivation of sexual recreation and pleasure. These themes are presented both through the lens of children and afflicted adults under the assumption that ‘life must go on’, and many things must be left behind.

== Egyptian speculative fiction ==
Egyptian speculative fiction arguably dates back to as early as 1906. In recent years, people from Egypt have been writing speculative fiction in response to the injustices they face.

Since a military coup in 2013, Egypt has been under a military rule. President Abdel Fattah al-Sisi has enforced an authoritative rule by severely punishing anyone who opposes, or has the threat of opposing, their actions. Since then, people have been arrested for protesting, and have faced extreme punishments if the security forces have even suspicions of disagreeing with those in power. Because of the strict laws around protesting, many citizens switch to creative critiques instead. Since 2014, the security forces have shut down and prevented any public expression of the arts, calling them “suspicious”. With activism and creativity being silenced and oppressed, many literary critics have turned to speculative fiction to express and comment on the dystopian qualities of their daily lives.

The works of Egyptian speculative writers, express themes such as anxiety of the possible punishment of expression, the pain that Egyptians are enduring under the military regime, and the effect of violence on the citizens. One example of speculative fiction is Otared by Egyptian writer Mohammed Rabie which follows an apocalyptic future in Egypt that ends in many deaths. Rabie expresses the pain of living under a military regime, that leads to love. Another author who works in the speculative genre is Ahmed Khaled Towfik. He is one of the first Arab writers to write science-fiction. He inspired other authors such as Ahmed Mourad. Nawal El Saadawi was a feminist writer who wrote from the unique perspective of experience womanhood in a politically oppressive state. Her 1975 novel, Woman at Point Zero, is based on a woman facing execution. The novel is the woman's account of the oppression she faced as a woman in Egyptian society and goes on to express the feminist idea of female agency.

Much of the speculative works coming from Egypt express the hopelessness that they feel under an authoritative rule. Many authors, however, still hold onto their agency as writers and critics.

== See also ==
- Speculative fiction by writers of color
