= Altaher Sharqawi =

Egyptian novelist

Altaher Muhammad Hussein Sharqawi
- Born: Egypt
- Other name: Taher Sharqawi
- Occupation: Writer
- Notable work: About Who Raises a Stone in His House

Altaher Sharqawi, (Arabic: الطاهر شرقاوي) Altaher Muhammad Hussein Sharqawi, an Egyptian novelist, graduated from the Faculty of Commerce Al-Azhar University. He was born in Armant, Luxor Governorate.

== Origin and beginning ==
The writer grew up in a simple environment and was influenced by this environment and by his mother. He was the son of a small village, in south of Egypt. He read books and magazines that he exchanges with his friends. He began his first attempts at writing in high school, where he composed poetry, imitating the poems he was studying, and their topics mostly revolved around the homeland, his beloved, and some religious poems. Then he discovered that poetry was unable to express what he had in mind, or perhaps it was because, he was unable to master the science of prosody perfectly, according to the writer. His Arabic teachers reviewed and corrected him, and they always encouraged him to continue with poetry, although there were many syllables with broken rhyme scheme in his pomes. Back then, the writer was not able to determine his destination, or what he wants to write, and he thinks he needs another type of writing more openness, at the same time gives him the ability to express himself, so they were primitive attempts in the short story. It developed into short story collections and then turned to writing the novel because he saw it is more comfortable than the short story and gives him more space and freedom to express. The short story is close to poetry with certain rules, while the novel has a space to highlight his skills as a writer and create a world and animate it at the same time.

== Literary works ==
The author has published a collection of books:

- "About Who Raises a Stone in His House, (Arabic: ean aladhi yurbaa hajaran fi baytih)" novel, Al kotob Khan Publishing House, Cairo, 2013.
- "Old people sitting on bench, (Arabic: eajayiz qaeidun ealaa aldakk)" Collection of Stories, Nahdet Misr Publishing House, Cairo, 2010.
- "Vanilla (Arabic: fanilya)", Novel, Sharqiyat Publishing House, Cairo, 2008.
- "The Voice of the Violin, (Arabic: sawt alkaman)" Collection of Stories, General Egyptian Book Organization, 2004.
- "The Musk's Lap, (Arabic: hadn almisk)" a story collection, Creative Series, General Organization of Culture Palaces, 2002.
- "The Girl Who Combs Her Hair, (Arabic: albint alati tumashit shaerah)" Story Collection, Family House Bookshop, 2001.

== Awards ==
- Best Novel Award for "About Who Raises a Stone in His House" Cairo International Book Fair 2013.
- First place in the novel "Vanilla," Youth Book Branch, Sawiris Cultural Award, 2010.
- First place: Story Collection of the Central Competition of the General Organization of Culture Palaces, 2004–2005.
- First place in the short story, Ihsan Abdel Kouddous story Competition, 2004.
- Second place: Story Collection of the Central Competition of the General Organization of Culture Palaces, 1999/2000.
