= Ahmad Magdy Hammam =

- أحمد مجدي همام
- Born: 1983 (age 42–43); United Arab Emirates
- Title: Writer
- Awards: Sawiris Cultural Award

Ahmad Magdy Hammam (Arabic: أحمد مجدي همام) is an Egyptian novelist, storyteller and journalist. He was born in the United Arab Emirates on 9 April 1983. He moved to Cairo in 2000, and he started working in the cultural press since 2010. He has published works in the Egyptian and the Arab periodicals, publications, and websites, including (Al-Ahram and Akhbar elyom, Albawabh News, Al-Dostor, Alhayat News, Al-Akhbar News and Al-Quds News. He worked as the editor-in-chief of the "World of Book" magazine, issued by the Egyptian Ministry of Culture, represented by the Egyptian General Book Authority. He has published many fictional and short stories. Also, he won many awards and honors, and participated in many cultural and artistic conferences and events in Egypt and abroad.

== Works ==
- The novel "From Cairo" (original text: qahry) was published by "Nefer" in Cairo, in 2008.
- The novel "Ibn Awaa's Pain" (original text: 'awjae abn awaa) published by "Merit" publishing house in Cairo, in 2011.
- Story collection "The gentleman prefers losing cases" (original text: aljintulman yufa'dil alqa'daya alkhasira) was published by the "Rawafed" publishing house in Cairo, in 2014.
- "The Story Factory" (original text: masnae alhikayat) (25 interviews) was published by Medad House in Dubai, in 2016.
- The novel "Ayyash" was published by Dar Al-Saqi in Beirut, in 2017.
- The novel "Recipe No. 7" two editions were published in 2017 and 2018 by The Egyptian Lebanese House in Cairo.
- "Reports to Sarah" (diaries) (original text: taqarir 'iilaa sara) issued in 2019 by Dar "Athr" in Dammam.
- The novel "Organized death" (original text: mut mun'dm) published by the "Hachette Antoine" house in Beirut, in 2021.

== Awards and grants ==
- He obtained the production grant from the Cultural Resource Foundation in 2013.
- Received a grant from the Arab Fund for Arts and Culture in 2015.
- He won the "Sawiris" Cultural Award, he got the first place, in the short story, in the Young Writers Branch.
- He arrived at the short list of the "Asfari" award, presented by the American University of Beirut, 2019.
