= Mansour El Souwaim =

Sudanese writer (born 1970)

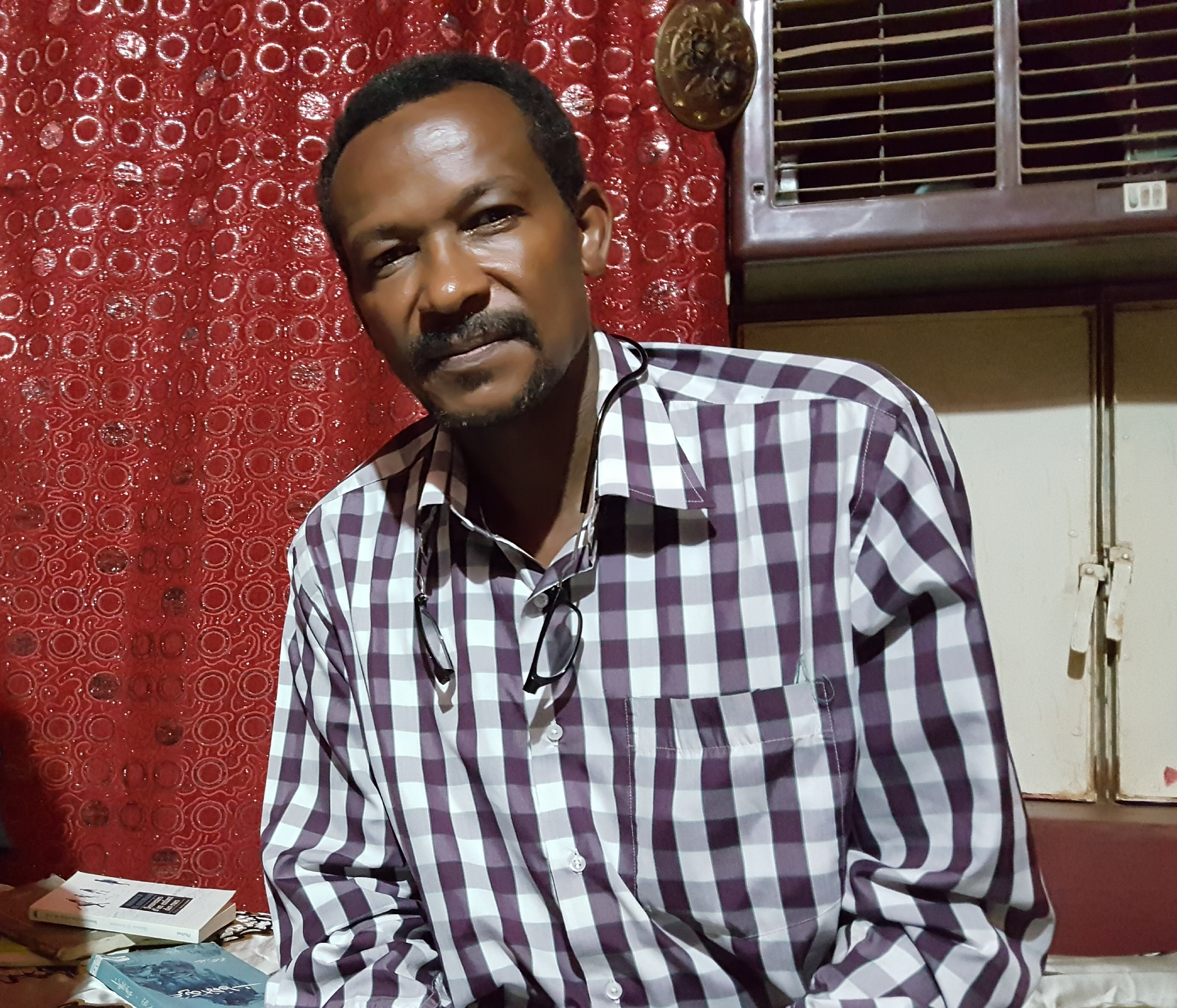
Mansour El Souwaim

Mansour El Souwaim (Arabic: منصور الصويم, born 1970 in Nyala, Sudan) is a Sudanese writer and journalist. He has published both novels and short stories. He was invited to join the first IPAF Nadwa (Arab writers' workshop) as well as the Beirut39 young Arab writers project, and has received international recognition through translations of his novels into English and French.

== Biography ==
El Souwaim was born in Nyala in southern Darfur, and lives and works in the Sudanese capital Khartoum. He started writing in 1990 and was first published in 1995. Up to 2021, he has released five novels and two collections of short stories. His first novel was called Tukhoum Ar-Ramad (Boundaries of Ash) and translated into English in 2012. His second novel, entitled Dhakirat Shirrir (Memoirs of a Villain), received the Tayeb Salih Award for Creative Writing, named after the famous Sudanese novelist, in 2005. It was published in French in 2021 and received a positive review in the literary section of Le Monde newspaper.

In 2009, El Souwaim was invited by the inaugural IPAF Nadwa (Arab writers' workshop). In 2010, he was one of the Beirut39, a group of 39 Arab writers under the age of 40, chosen through a contest organised by Banipal magazine and the Hay Festival. In 2011, El Souwaim received a grant by the Arab Fund for Arts and Culture (AFAC) for his next project, a historical novel entitled The Last Sultan. In 2023, he was awarded his second Tayeb Salih International Award for Creative Writing for his novel Blue Algae.

== Works in Arabic and in translation ==
- Tukhoum Ar-Ramad (Boundaries of Ash), 1995, English translation 2012
- Dhakirat Shirrir (Memories of a Bad Boy), 2005 French translation: Souvenirs d'un enfant des rues. 2012. ISBN 978-2752905123
- Ashbāḥ Faransāwī (French ghosts), 2014
- Ākhir al-salāṭīn: ḥurūb al-sulṭān ʻAlī Dīnār ʻalá tukhūm madāfin al-salāṭīn, (The Fall of the Sultans: Sultan Ali Dinar's Wars on the Borders of the Sultans' Tombs) 2016
- ʻArabat al-amwāt (The Chariot of the Dead), 2016
- Kānat, wa kān, wa kānat al ukhrā (She was, he was, and the other one was), short stories, 2021

== See also ==
- Sudanese literature
- List of Sudanese writers
- Modern Arabic literature
