= Zaki Baydoun =

Lebanese poet and painter (born 1981)

Zaki Baydoun (born 1981) is a Lebanese poet and painter. Born in Tyre, he studied philosophy at the Université de St Denis in Paris. He has published several collections of poetry and short stories. As an artist, he has also exhibited in Lebanon. In 2009, he was named as one of the Beirut39, a selection of the best young writers in the Arab world.
