= Lana Abdel Rahman =

Lebanese writer and journalist

Lana Abdul Rahman
- لنا عبد الرحمن
- Education: Lebanese University, The American University in Cairo
- Occupations: Writer; journalist; author

Lana Abdel Rahman (Arabic: لنا عبد الرحمن) is a Lebanese writer and journalist. She studied at the Lebanese University in Beirut and the American University in Cairo. She lives in Cairo and works as a journalist. Abdel Rahman is the author of three novels and two short story collections. In 2009, she was chosen as one of the eight participants in the inaugural IPAF Nadwa (writers' workshop). An extract from her latest novel Song for Margaret was published in the Nadwa anthology under the title "Letters to Yann Andrea".

== Biography ==
Lina Abdel Rahman earned a BA in Arabic language from Beirut University in 1997, an MA in literary studies from the Arabic Language Department in 2007, and a PhD in autobiography in the Lebanese female novel in 2010. She has worked in cultural journalism since 2000.

== Writing ==
Lana Abdel Rahman has worked for several Arab newspapers, including As-Safir, Al-Quds Al-Arabi, Akhbar Al-Adab, Al-Bayan, and Al-Hayat. She worked for Al-Kifah Al-Arabi newspaper in Beirut from 2001 to 2003. She currently works as deputy editor-in-chief of the Egyptian Sawt Al-Balad newspaper and editor-in-chief of Noqtat Daw website, a cultural website. Her first novel, "Mirage Gardens," was published in 2006. She lives in Egypt and is a member of the Egyptian Journalists Syndicate, the Federation of Arab Journalists, the Egyptian Writers Union, and the Cairo Story Club.
