= Nazem El Sayed =

Lebanese poet (born 1975)

Nazem El Sayed (born 1975) is a Lebanese and American poet and journalist. He studied Arabic literature at the Lebanese University. He has published several collections of Arabic prose poetry, and his work has been frequently anthologized. He was one of the writers included in the Beirut39 selection of young Arab writers.

El Sayed lives in Washington, D.C.
