= Akram Msallam =

Palestinian journalist and writer

Akram Msallam' (Arabic: أكرم مسلّم) (born 1971) is a Palestinian novelist. He was born in the village of Talfit in Nablus Governorate and studied Arabic literature at Bir Zeit University. He has published two novels. He has also edited the diaries of the Palestinian scholar Khalil Sakakini. Msallam was a participant in the 2010 IPAF Nadwa.
