= Hussein al Abri =

Omani writer and novelist

- حسين العبري
- Born: 1972 (age 52–53); Oman
- Occupation(s): psychiatric, writer, novelist

Hussein al-Abri (Arabic:حسين العبرى), an Omani writer of short stories and novels, born in 1972. He is a psychiatrist and works at the General psychiatric Hospital in Muscat. Abri has published 5 novels, short stories and numerous articles. He won the "Beirut 39" festival of Hay Festival Foundation in cooperation with the Lebanese Ministry of Culture 2009.

== Education and career ==
Hussein al-Abri was born in the state of Hamra in Oman. He began writing stories while he was at the university and publishing some articles and short stories in local and daily newspapers. In 2000, he published his first novel Diazepam.

In his writings, Abri discusses social and political issues. In 2005, his second novel Tingling was banned for a while since he touched upon the Omani security services. Whereas, his third novel Ship of Fools which was published in 2015, tells about mentally ill patients and the obstacles the doctor faces in a hospital that does not care about public health.

Al Abri also translated into Arabic a philosophy book entitled What Does It All Mean? by Thomas Nagel. Later, he translated another book, with the contribution of Hamad Sinan Al-Ghaithi, entitled Neanderthal Man: In Search of Lost Genomes by Svante Paabo. In 2009, al Abri won the Hay Festival Beirut 39.

== Awards ==
- He was awarded the Sultan Qaboos Medal for Literature and Arts in 2007
- He won the "Beirut 39" festival in 2009.
