= Saif al-Rahbi =

Omani poet, essayist and writer (born 1956)

Saif al-Rahbi (born 1956) is an Omani poet, essayist and writer. He was born in Oman in a village called Suroor. In 1970, while he was still in his early teens, al-Rahbi was sent to school in Cairo. Afterwards, he lived and worked abroad for many years, in Cairo, Damascus, Algeria, Paris and London among others.

Al-Rahbi's third poetry collection The Bells of Rapture (1985) marked his arrival as an important new voice in Arabic poetry. At the time he was living in Paris. Eventually, he returned to Oman and established Nizwa, Oman's leading quarterly cultural magazine. Currently, he is editor-in-chief of the magazine.

Al-Rahbi has published several books of poetry and prose till date. His work has appeared in Banipal magazine, where he also serves as a consulting editor. He was on the judging panel of the 2010 Arabic Booker Prize, and he was also a judge of Beirut39, a competition held in 2009-10 to identify the most promising young Arab writers.
