= Waleed Ouda =

Palestinian novelist (born 1973)

Waleed Ouda (born 1973) is a Palestinian novelist. He was born in Kuwait. He has a PhD in computer engineering and currently works in the United Arab Emirates. He has written four novels. He was a participant in the 2012 International Prize for Arabic Fiction Nadwa.
