= Jan Beagle =

New Zealand diplomat

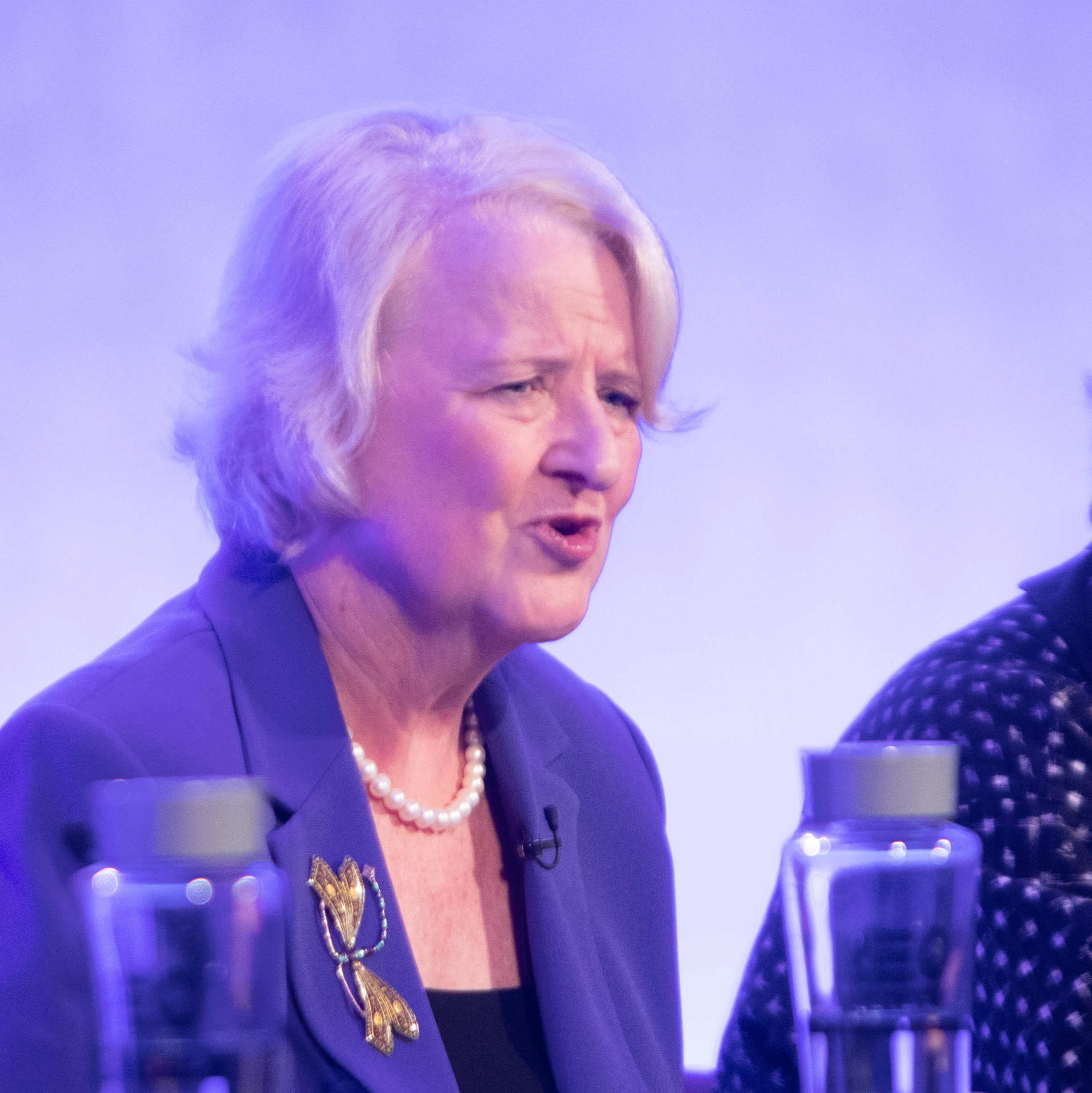
Discussing Safeguarding in 2018

Jan Margaret Beagle is a diplomat from New Zealand who has been serving as the Director-General of the International Development Law Organization (IDLO) since 2020 after retiring from the UN system. From 2017 until 2019, she was the Under-Secretary-General of the United Nations for Management, appointed to this position by United Nations Secretary-General António Guterres on 1 June 2017. She then served as Special Advisor to the Secretary-General on Systemwide Implementation of Chief Executive Board decisions.

Earlier in her career, Beagle held the position of Deputy Executive Director of the Joint United Nations Programme on HIV/AIDS, known as UNAIDS. From 2008 to 2009, she was the Deputy Director-General of the United Nations Office at Geneva, and from 2005 to 2007, Assistant Secretary-General for Human Resources Management.

== Education ==
Beagle holds a master's degree with first class honours in History and International Relations from the University of Auckland, New Zealand. In 2018, Beagle was a recipient of the University of Auckland Distinguished Alumni Award.

== Career ==
Beginning her career in the New Zealand Ministry of Foreign Affairs, including as a delegate to the United Nations in New York, Beagle worked across the peace and security, human rights, development, management and gender sectors.

As Assistant Secretary-General and Deputy Executive Director of UNAIDS, Beagle oversaw the development of the UNAIDS Strategy 2016-2021, the first UN system strategy to be fully aligned with the Sustainable Development Goals (SDGs) following their adoption in September 2015. While working for UNAIDS, Beagle led a programme to increase the number of women working in senior positions across the agency.

Beagle also served as Deputy Director-General of the United Nations Office at Geneva (UNOG).

Beagle has also held senior positions in the Executive Office of the Secretary-General, the Office of the Administrator of UNDP, and the Department of Political and Security Council Affairs. She has represented the Secretary-General as spokesperson for the system in the General Assembly, International Civil Service Commission (ICSC) and the Pension Board, and as a member of the Boards of the United Nations System Staff College and UNITAR. She also served as the Chair of the Assistant Secretary-General Advisory Group of the United Nations Development Group.

In 2019, Guterres appointed Beagle as his Special Adviser on System-wide Implementation of Chief Executive Board (CEB) decisions.

Since 2020, Beagle has been serving as Director-General of the International Development Law Organization (IDLO), succeeding Irene Khan.

=== Controversies ===
In 2017, she was investigated over harassment claims. The UNAIDS executive director, Michel Sidibé, recommended the case be closed following an internal investigation that found the allegations were unsubstantiated. Shortly following the internal investigation at UNAIDS, in November 2017, Beagle was appointed to lead the United Nations' High-Level Task-Force on Sexual Harassment, which is charged with improving support for sexual harassment victims and strengthening internal investigations. In May 2018, she launched the organization's screening system to prevent former employees guilty of sexual misconduct from finding new jobs with its agencies or other charities.

On 10 February 2020 the Administrative Tribunal of the International Labour Organization (ILOAT), during its 129st session, in case 4241, ruled that claims of harassment were indeed substantiated and that UNAIDS "...incurred liability towards the complainant on account of this harassment..." Further, the tribunal ruled that the UN body had "breached its duty of care" and mishandled the complaints of harassment. It ruled that there was "sufficient evidence that the complainant suffered harassment over a period of time." Beagle commented that she was disappointed by the tribunal's decision, and argued that the initial investigation conducted had been very thorough, denying misconduct.

In the second Guardian expose on the matter, Beagle commented:

“At no time was I aware that she considered my decisions offending – on the contrary, I continued to ask my colleagues to try to support her, as I did myself,” she said.

== Other activities ==
- International Gender Champions (IGC), Member of the Global Advisory Board
- United Nations System Staff College (UNSSC), Member of the Board of Governors
