= Hussein Jelaad =

Jordanian writer

Hussein Jelaad (born 1970) is a Jordanian writer. He studied political science at Yarmouk University, before becoming a journalist. He has worked at Al Jazeera since 2007. Hussein has published several books, among them the poetry collections Eternal Crucifixion of the Prominent (1999) and As Prophets Lose (2007). His most recent book, a short story collection titled The Eyes of the Drowned, appeared in 2023.

In 2009, Jelaad was named by the Beirut39 project as one of the most promising writers in the Arab world.
