= Sawiris Foundation for Social Development =

Egyptian charity

Sawiris Foundation for Social Development مؤسسة ساويرس للتنمية الإجتماعية
- Founded: 2001
- Type: Non-profit
- Location: Garden City Cairo
- Key people: Mohamed I Shaker (Chairman); Ismail Serageldin (Vice-Chairman)
- Website: Official website

Sawiris Foundation for Social Development (Arabic: مؤسسة ساويرس للتنمية الإجتماعية) is an Egyptian charity organization linked to the Sawiris Family established in 2001 and a prominent institution of economic and social aid in Egypt. It has been described as "Egypt's first modern family grant-making foundation".

== History ==
The foundation was established with support from Yousreya Loza-Sawiris with support from Ibrahim Shihata.

Initially funded with an endowment of corporate shares, this arrangement was challenged by the Ministry of Social Solidarity, the shares were liquidated, and the foundation now has a cash endowment.

== Activities ==
Its activities include:

- Creating projects that provide job opportunities for Egyptians, including the 'Yalla neshtaghal' programme for the garment industry
- Training particularly in economic sectors and professions that are not adequately available in the Egyptian market
- Placement of qualified Egyptians in the job market
- Scholarships in various colleges and universities with particular programs for scholarships at Queen Mary at University of London and at ETH Zurich.

Since 2005, the foundation also distributes annual literary prizes under the name Sawiris Foundation Awards for Egyptian Literature (in Arabic جائزة مؤسسة ساويرس للأدب المصري) in novels, story collections, short stories, best scenario on long feature movies, best first-time scenario written for cinema. Among the recent winners is novelist Reem Bassiouney.

The Sawiris Foundation is recognised for evaluating the impact of its interventions, including through randomized controlled trials.
