= Abderrahim Elkhassar =

Moroccan poet

Abderrahim Elkhassar (Arabic: عبد الرحيم الخصار; born 1975) is a Moroccan poet. He was born in the town of Safi on the Atlantic coast. Although of Amazigh origin, he writes primary in the Arabic language. He published his first book of poetry (At last winter came) in 2004. As of 2018, he has published half a dozen volumes. In 2010, he was chosen as one of the Beirut39, a selection of the best young writers in the Arab world, the 39 best Arab writers below the age of 40.
