= Federation of Journalists of Iraq =

Iraqi Journalists Syndicate نقابة الصحفيين العراقيين
- Founded: 1969
- Type: Gov. organization
- Purpose: Journalism, press freedom
- Location: Iraq
- Members: 120+
- Key people: "Moaid Allami"(Arabic: مؤيد اللامي), President
- Website: iraqijs.org/index.php

The Federation of Journalists of Iraq (Arabic: (IJS) نقابة الصحفيين العراقيين) is a journalists association in Iraq founded on 11 June 1969. It was formed out of several local associations and unions that were formed by journalists in provinces such as Baghdad. Its current President is Moaid Allami.

== See also ==
- International Federation of Journalists
