= Abdullah Thabit =

Saudi Arabian writer

Abdullah Thabit (Arabic: عبد الله ثابت, born 1973) is a Saudi Arabian poet, novelist and journalist. He was born in the city of Abha in the southern province of Asir. He studied Arabic literature at King Khaled University, and works as a journalist at the Saudi daily Al-Watan.

Thabit has published several volumes of poetry. He has also written a bestselling novel titled Terrorist Number 20 (2006). The book recalls his teenage years as a religious extremist and was inspired in part by Ahmad Alnami, one of the 9/11 hijackers and a fellow resident of Abha who was vaguely familiar to Thabit. In April 2006, three months after the release of the book, Thabit was forced to move from Abha to Jeddah with his family after receiving death threats.

In 2009-10, Thabit was recognised by the Beirut39 project as one of the best writers in the Arab world under the age of 40. His work has appeared in English translation in the Beirut39 anthology, edited by Samuel Shimon.

In 2012, Thabit participated in the International Writing Program's Fall Residency at the University of Iowa in Iowa City, Iowa.
