= Federation of Arab Journalists =

Arabic organization

Federation of Arab Journalists الاتحاد العام للصحفيين العرب
- Founded: 1964
- Type: organization
- Purpose: Journalism, press freedom
- Location: Cairo, Egypt
- Members: +19 Syndicates
- Key people: "Moaid Allami"(Arabic: مؤيد اللامي), President
- Website: faj.org.eg

The Federation of Arab Journalists (Arabic: الاتحاد العام للصحفيين العرب, romanized: al-Ittiḥād al-ʻāmm lil-Ṣuḥufīyīn al-ʻArab) is an Arab professional organization with permanent headquarters in Cairo. Its slogan is “Freedom and Responsibility”. Its preparatory committee was established in February 1964 and held its meetings at the headquarters of the Egyptian Journalists Syndicate in Cairo. It includes more than 19 Arab journalistic unions under its umbrella.

The current president is Moaid Allami (Arabic: مؤيد اللامي).

== See also ==
- International Federation of Journalists
