= Abdelaziz Errachidi =

Moroccan writer

Abdelaziz Errachidi (Arabic: عبد العزيز الراشدي; born 1978) is a Moroccan writer. He was born in Zagora and now lives in Agadir. He has published several novels and short story collections, including Nomads on the Cliff (2006), Alley of Death (2004), Childhood of a Frog (2005), and Sands of Pain, House Faces (2007). He has also published a volume of essays Foreigners at My Table (2008). The winner of several literary prizes, he was selected as one of the Beirut39, a selection of the best young writers writing in the Arabic language.
