= International Development Law Organization =

Intergovernmental organization

- Abbreviation: IDLO
- Formation: January 1, 1983; 43 years ago
- Founded: 1988
- Type: IGO
- Headquarters: Rome, Italy
- Region served: Worldwide
- Members: 37
- Director-General: Jan Beagle
- Affiliations: United Nations
- Website: idlo.int

The International Development Law Organization (IDLO) is an intergovernmental organization dedicated to the promotion of the rule of law.

With a joint focus on the promotion of rule of law and development, it works to empower people and communities to claim their rights, and provides governments with the know-how to realize them. It supports emerging economies and middle-income countries to strengthen their legal capacity and rule of law framework for sustainable development and economic opportunity. It is the only intergovernmental organization with an exclusive mandate to promote the rule of law and has experience working in 63 countries around the world.

IDLO is headquartered in Rome, Italy and has a branch office in The Hague and New York, and is one of a number of entities that are United Nations General Assembly observers.

IDLO has operated in dozens of sovereign states, focusing on institution-building and legal empowerment. Its alumni network includes more than 20,000 legal professionals in 175 countries and 46 independent alumni associations. According to the Financial Statement of 2025, IDLO had 15 country offices in addition to branch offices in The Hague and New York, and carried out programmes in 42 countries.

IDLO has signed MoUs with United Nations agencies, governments, universities, and other entities. Major financial contributions to IDLO have come from the Australian Agency for International Development, Gates Foundation, Center for International Forestry Research, European Bank for Reconstruction and Development, European Union, Ford Foundation, Deutsche Gesellschaft für Internationale Zusammenarbeit, International Fund for Agricultural Development, Institute of Medicine, Kuwait Fund for Arab Economic Development, OPEC Fund for International Development, United Nations Development Programme, and UNICEF as well as numerous countries, namely Canada, China, Denmark, France, Ireland, Italy, Netherlands, Sweden, Switzerland, United Kingdom, and the United States.

Jan Beagle is the current Director-General of IDLO.

== History ==
IDLO began in 1983 as a non-governmental organization (then called International Development Law Institute) founded by three legal advisors to cooperation agencies in Egypt: L. Michael Hager (USA), William T. Loris (USA) and Gilles Blanchi (France), with the Board presided by Dr Ibrahim Shihata (founder of the OPEC Fund for International Development and Senior Vice-President and General Counsel of the World Bank from 1983 to 1998). The Board also included, among others, Professor René David. The Governments of the United States and Italy provided the start-up seed money and the Headquarters establishment agreement was signed in Rome in 1988. The Institute evolved to an intergovernmental organization in 1991 after its first Assembly of Member States in 1990. After the Fall of the Berlin Wall, increased training and assistance was provided in the field of legal and judicial reform in developing and transition countries. In the second half of the 90s, greater attention was also given to sustainable development and the civil society as well as to countries emerging from conflicts if not genocides (e.g. Cambodia, Rwanda). In 2002, the Institute was renamed International Development Law Organisation. In 2001, IDLO was granted Permanent Observer Status at the United Nations. In 2014, IDLO opened a branch office in The Hague.

== Governance ==
=== Member states ===
As an intergovernmental organization, membership to the organization is made up of signatories to the Establishment Agreement of IDLO. The thirty-seven Parties to IDLO's Establishment Agreement are:

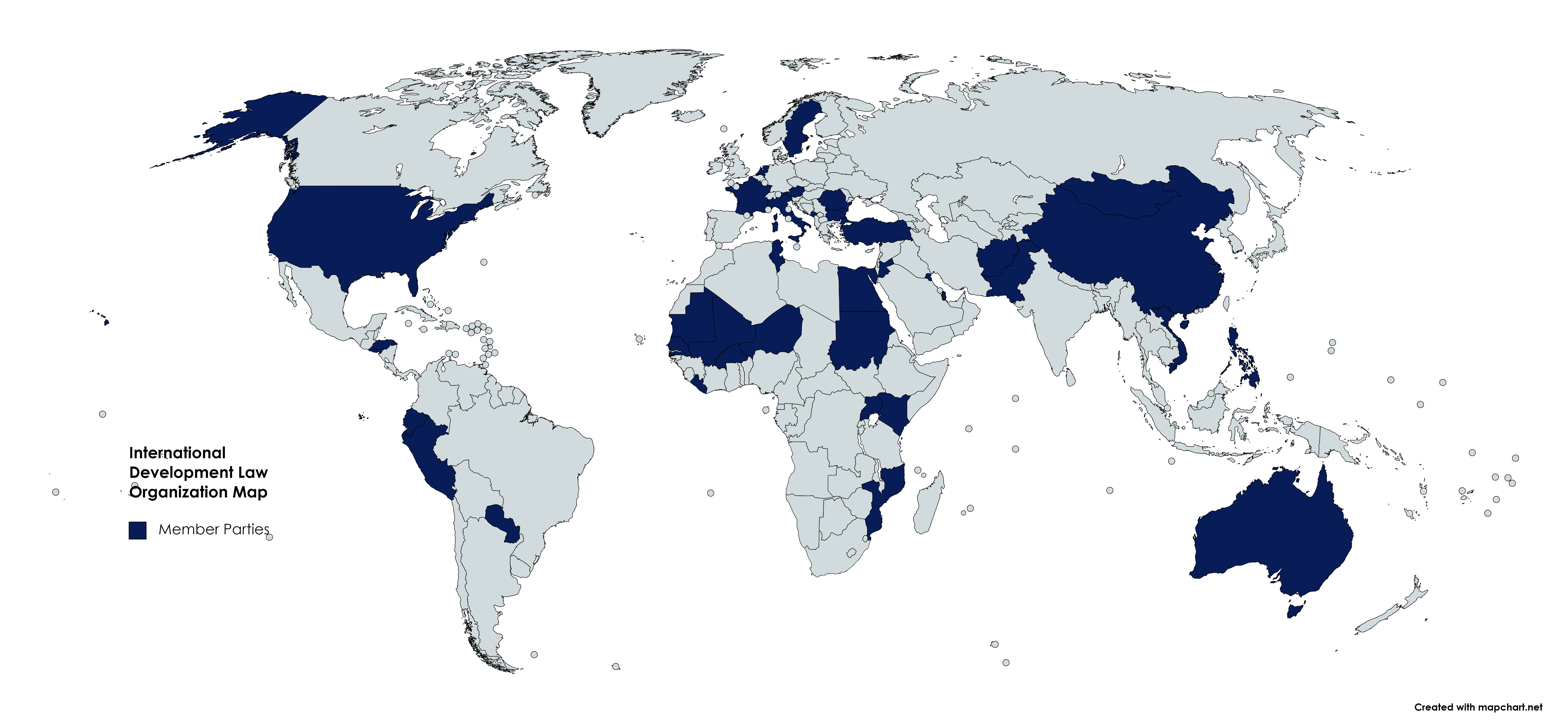
International Development Law Organization Map - Member Parties

- Afghanistan
- Australia
- Austria
- Bulgaria
- Burkina Faso
- China
- Ecuador
- Egypt
- El Salvador
- France
- Honduras
- Italy [Vice President ex officio]
- Jordan
- Kenya
- Kuwait
- Liberia
- Mali
- Mauritania
- Mongolia
- Montenegro
- Mozambique
- Netherlands
- Niger
- OFID
- Pakistan
- Paraguay
- Peru
- Philippines
- Qatar
- Romania
- Senegal
- Sudan
- Sweden
- Tunisia
- Turkey
- Uganda
- Vietnam

=== Former member states ===
- United States

=== Governance Structure ===
==== Assembly of Parties ====
Member Party states form the Assembly of Parties, IDLO's highest decision-making body. Kuwait currently sits as President of the Assembly of parties while the US has won the vice-president post. The role of the Assembly is to determine the IDLO's policies and oversee the work of the Director-General.

==== Director-General ====
Jan Beagle is the current Director-General of IDLO. She was first elected by Member Parties on 13 November 2019 and formally assumed office on 1 January 2020 for a four-year term. On 13 November 2023, she was re-elected for a second four-year term beginning in January 2024.

==== International Advisory Council ====
IDLO's International Advisory Council is composed of:

- Abdel-Latif Al-Hamad: Chairman and CEO, Arab Fund for Economic and Social Development
- Abdou Diouf: Former President of the Republic of Senegal
- Willy Mutunga: Former Chief Justice of Kenya
- Thomas Pickering: Former United States Ambassador and Under Secretary of State
- Mary Robinson: Former UN High Commissioner for Human Rights
- Albie Sachs: Former Justice, Constitutional Court of South Africa
- Muhammad Yunus: Nobel Peace Laureate, Chairman of Yunus Centre and Founder of Grameen Bank

==== Senior Management ====
- Haroun Atallah: Director of Finance and Support Services
- Ilaria Bottigliero: Director of Policy, Research and Learning
- Henk-Jan Brinkman: Permanent Observer to the United Nations (New York)
- Mark Cassayre: Permanent Observer to the United Nations (Geneva)
- Liliana De Marco: Director of External Relations and Partnerships
- Fabricio Guariglia: Director, The Hague Office
- Karen Johnson: General Counsel
- Romualdo Mavedzenge: Director of Programmes
- Cornelia Moussa: Director of Human Resources and Office Services
- Kartik Sharma: Director of the Director General

== Work ==
IDLO has worked in dozens of countries around the world, with the belief that justice means ensuring fair outcomes in concrete, local terms. From 2024-2026, funding went to 41 countries, including Ukraine, Somalia, Afghanistan, Uganda, Kenya, the Philippines, DRC, Moldova, Liberia, Tunisia, Burkina Faso, Mali, Niger, Honduras, Mongolia, Tanzania, Indonesia, Mozambique, the Bahamas, the Gambia, Rwanda, Bangladesh, Ghana, Sri Lanka, Nepal, Thailand, Myanmar, North Macedonia, Montenegro, Guatemala, Mauritius, Sierra Leone, Senegal, Jordan, the Kyrgyz Republic, Tajikistan, Uzbekistan, Ethiopia, and Malawi.

=== Somalia ===
IDLO has been working in Somalia for the last thirty years, providing training to Somali legal professionals and technical assistance to the judiciary. Somali Prime Minister, Dr. Abdiweli Mohamed Ali has called IDLO "a premiere institution that is supporting Somalia on its journey to peace and stability."

In recent years, IDLO has worked on supporting the development of a Somali constitution and in the integration of customary justice. In 2011 IDLO created an assessment of traditional and customary justice, arguing that linking customary and traditional justice in a bottom up approach would be most effective.

Financed by the Italian government, IDLO worked with local experts on the country's provisional Constitution, holding consultative sessions with Mogadishu residents, refugees, and the Somali diaspora.

Towards the adoption of the Constitution, IDLO helped produce a comparative analysis of the new draft Constitution, the Constitution of 1960 and the Transitional Federal Charter of 2004 and supported the Constitutional Affairs and Reconciliation Ministry in hosting a conference on fundamental rights and transitional justice.

Following the adoption of the constitution by the National Constitution Assembly on 1 August 2012 IDLO drafted a report on providing analysis and suggestions for Justice and Security development under the new constitutional order. The report provides a description of steps to be taken during the implementation phase of the constitution, including the establishment of institutions, development and revision of legislative frameworks, and capacity building. It also sketches out dispute resolution mechanisms of the three legal systems in Somalia: xeer, Shari’ah, and the statutory judiciary.

Comparing the draft constitution to those from 53 of the 56 member states of the Organization of the Islamic Cooperation, as well as the constitutions of Italy and the United States of America, IDLO found that it contained 36 of the 45 fundamental rights - placing it in the top five of the countries surveyed. The organization also stated that the Somali draft constitution contained 15 more than the Constitution of the United States of America.

=== Afghanistan ===
IDLO has been active in Afghanistan since 2002, stating their intent has been to restore rule of law in the country and develop a new idea of justice, while respecting the principles of Islam. Primarily Afghan staff have been used to train legal professionals in the country.

Following a survey taken by the IDLO in 2013, which found that women made up just over 8 percent of the country's judges, 6 percent of prosecutors and less than one fifth of lawyers, IDLO's Director General Irene Khan called for greater participation of women in Afghanistan's justice sector.

==== Women's Rights ====
Whilst the Constitution of Afghanistan offers protection to women, domestic and sexual violence are common and considered a family matter, dealt through informal justice systems composed of male elders. In June 2009, IDLO launched Afghanistan's first Violence against Women Unit, with support from the office of the Attorney General of Afghanistan. IDLO reports that in 2010 the unit handled more than 300 cases.

In December 2010 The U.S. Department of State's Bureau of International Narcotics and Law Enforcement Affairs (INL) contributed $12.1 million to expand and improve legal aid services to the poor and disempowered, increase public awareness of legal issues, rights and services, and improve the investigation and prosecution of crimes against women and girls.

On 11 April 2013 INL announced it would provide IDLO a further $59 million for programmes in Afghanistan: $47 million to fund IDLO implement training programmes for the Afghan justice sector – the Justice Training Transition Program (JTTP) – and another $12 million for a separate IDLO program to provide support and training for prosecution of crimes against women.

==== Allegations of Lack of Oversight ====
In January 2014 the Special Inspector General for Afghanistan Reconstruction (SIGAR) released a report highlighting it believed there to be a lack of oversight requirements in INL's 2013 contract with IDLO in relation to JTTP . SIGAR had previously warned of a lack of monitoring in an ‘alert-letter’ to the State Department sent to the State Department on July 22, 2013. The letter also accused IDLO of refusing to provide SIGAR with information regarding its budget, organizational structure and financial relationship with the US government.

In response to SIGAR's 2013 statement, State Department deputy spokeswoman Marie Harf said that there were no allegations or evidence of fraud, waste or mismanagement in the program and that oversight was provided through daily contact on the ground. In a letter responding to SIGAR's claims, INL highlighted mechanisms of accountability and stated their confidence in the IDLO program.

In a statement posted on their website IDLO called their monitoring and evaluation mechanisms ‘robust and extensive’. IDLO also refuted SIGAR's statement that it had refused to provide information writing that they had met with SIGAR staff in April and May 2013.

=== South Sudan ===
IDLO provided the newly established country of South Sudan with technical legal assistance; training the judiciary in both the fundamentals of common law and, during the process of transition away from a Shari’ah based legal system, in ‘legal’ English.

With funding from the European Union in 2014, IDLO scaled up their work in South Sudan, delivering a series of context-specific training courses to 150 newly appointed judges and judicial support staff.

IDLO also stated it was providing technical assistance in drafting a permanent Constitution for South Sudan.

=== Kenya ===
Working with constitutional scholars Zachary Elkins and Tom Ginsberg, IDLO sponsored a group of constitutional scholars from universities in America to review drafts of the Kenyan constitution and provide feedback to the Kenyan Parliament.

In 2013, USAID partnered with IDLO to assist the Government of Kenya develop the comprehensive laws and policies required under the new Constitution, assisting the Kenyan Parliament in reviewing, analysing and passing 55 laws, including 16 required by the Constitution. Investigators in the project used data and analyzed from over 3000 constitutions in the world to share with Kenya's Commission for the Implementation of the Constitution (CIC) an analysis of the constitutional implementation process. IDLO also implemented projects to strengthen the capacity of the judiciary and engage the public in the process. IDLO has also stated that they are working with the government of Kenya to advance gender equality across the country and enact gender provisions contained in the Constitution.

An independent report found that its work in Kenya had provided support and services were delivered to fulfil identified needs COE and ensured the delivery trainings to educate Kenyans on the proposed Constitution before it was put to a national referendum. Despite some challenges, the report notes, IDLO consultants produced and delivered high quality technical reports and services which eventually contributed to the final version of the Constitution of KenyaRolene Guilland (17 November 2009). Supporting the Committee of Experts on cCnstitutional Review (PDF) (Report). Archived from the original (PDF) on 6 May 2015..

A permanent IDLO regional office was set up in Kenya in 2011.

=== Women and Girls ===
In a speech at the Graduate Institute of International and Development Studies in Geneva, Director-General Irene Khan highlighted the importance of law in empowering women:

"A core principle of the rule of law is that we are all equal - equally protected by the law and equally accountable to it."

The organization's website states that across all of its programs, IDLO works to empower women. In February 2013 IDLO released a report on women's access to justice, with a focus on improving customary justice for women.

=== Customary Justice ===
IDLO has a number of times, including at the UN, emphasized the importance of working with informal or customary justice systems and has released multiple edited volumes on customary justice.
