= Yahya Qassim =

Saudi Arabian writer

Yahya Qasim Sabi known in Bareqi Arabic as Yahya Amqassim (Arabic: يحيى امقاسم; born 1971) is a Saudi Arabian writer. A graduate of King Saud University, he is currently a foreign diplomat and has served in the Saudi embassies in Paris and Beirut. He has written two books: Stories from Saudi Arabia (2004) and Saq al-Ghurab (The Crow Leg, 2008). In 2009-10, he was chosen by the Beirut39 project as one of the best young writers from the Arab world. His work has appeared in English translation in the Beirut39 anthology, edited by Samuel Shimon.
