= Abderrazak Boukebba =

Algerian writer, poet (born 1977)

- Born: عبد الرزاق بوكبة; 1977 (age 48–49); Awlad J'hish village, Algeria
- Education: BA degree in 1996 in Algeria
- Occupations: Journalist, author & television presenter

Abderrazak Boukebba (Arabic: عبد الرزاق بوكبة ) (born 1977) is an Algerian journalist, author and television presenter. He was born in a village called Awlad J'hish in eastern Algeria. He studied literature at university, earning a BA degree in 1996. Initially, he worked as a consultant to the Algerian National Library before moving on to become an editor of television and radio programmes. He has worked for Algeria's national broadcaster ENTV.

As an author, Boukebba has published short story collections, volumes of poetry and novels. He has received the President Award in Algeria for his writing. In 2009–10, he was selected as one of the most promising Arab authors under the age of 40 by the Beirut39 project conducted under the aegis of the Hay Festival. His work appeared in translation in the Beirut39 anthology edited by Samuel Shimon.

In May 2010, Boukebba went on hunger strike to protest working conditions at ENTV, where he had worked for the previous five years as a producer and presenter of cultural programmes.

== Selected works ==
- Who Hid Sibawayh's Footwear in the Sand (2004, short stories)
- Wings for the Mood of the White Wolf (2008, short stories)
- The Skin of the Shadow (2009, novel)
