= Nagat Ali =

Egyptian poet

Nagat Ali (born 2 November 1975) is an Egyptian poet. She was born and raised in Cairo. She studied Arabic literature at university, and is working on a PhD dissertation on Naguib Mahfouz. The author of three books of poetry, she was named as one of the Beirut39 list of young Arab writers.
