= Najwa Binshatwan =

Libyan academic and author

Najwa Bin Shatwan
- Born: 1970 (age 55–56); Ajdabiya, Libya
- Occupations: Novelist; Academic

Najwa Bin Shatwan (Arabic: نجوى بن شتوان) is a Libyan academic and novelist, the first Libyan to ever be shortlisted for the International Prize for Arabic Fiction (in 2017).

She has authored four novels: Waber Al Ahssina (The Horses’ Hair); Madmum Burtuqali (Orange Content); Zareeb Al-Abeed (The Slave Yards) and Roma Termini, in addition to several collections of short stories, plays and contributions to anthologies. She was chosen as one of the thirty-nine best Arab authors under the age of forty by Hay Festival’s Beirut 39 project (2009). In 2018, she was chosen from hundreds of Arab writers for the 2018 Banipal Writing Fellowship Residency at the University of Durham and in 2020, she was chosen to co-lead a series of creative writing workshops in Sharjah (World Capital of the year book 2019) for Arab writers. Also, she was chosen as a member of jury in various literary awards.

== Biography ==
Najwa Binshatwan was born in 1970 in Ajdabiya, Libya. She obtained a master's degree in education, after which she worked as a lecturer at Garyounis University. She also completed a doctoral degree in humanities from La Sapienza University in Rome, Italy. Her doctoral research focused on the slave trade in Libya and the repercussions on Libyan society and organization in the Ottoman period (1552-1911).

== Works ==
Bibliography taken from the Beirut39 writers' biographies.

=== Novels ===
- Binshatwan, Najwa (2005). Waber Al Ahssina (The Horses' Hair) (in Arabic). Sharjah: Dar Rewayat. ISBN 9789948347774.
- Binshatwan, Najwa (2021). Roma Termini (in Arabic). Sharjah: Dar Rewayat. ISBN 9789948258285.
- “Waber Al Ahssina” (The Horses' Hair) – "Best Arabic Novel Prize" at the Sudanese al-Begrawiya Festival in Khartoum – (2005). It was published by “Dar Rewayat” – Sharjah – (2020)
- "Zareeb Al-Abeed" – “Dar Al-Saqi” – Beirut – (2016) – Shortlisted in the International Award for Arabic Fiction – (2017)
- “Madmum Burtuqali” (Orange Content) – “Dar Charquiat” – Cairo– (2008)

=== Translated Books ===
- “Catalogue of a Private Life” – Stories – (in English) – “Dedalus Books” – UK – (2021)
- “The Slave Yards” – Novel (in English) – “Syracuse University Press” – USA – (2020)

=== Short Stories Collection ===
- “Eshrown Hala Kunto Fiha Wahidan” (Twenty Situations I Was Alone) – “Dar Mintad” – Kuwait – (2019)
- "Soudfa Jariaa"(An Ongoing Coincidence) –“Riad El-Rayyes Books” – Beirut – (2019)
- “Cataloug Hayat Khasa” (Catalogue of a Private Life) – “Dar Athar” – Saudi Arabia – (2018)
- “al-Jadaa Salha” (Grandma Salha) – “Dar al-Khayal” – Beirut – (2012) (translated into Spanish/not published yet)
- “al-Malika” (The Queen) – “General Cultural Council” – Libya– (2007) – (Translated and published in Italian)
- “Toufl Al Waw” (The Waw Child) – “General Cultural Council” – Libya – (2006)
- “Qissass Laysat Lil-Rijal” (Stories Not for Men) – “Dar Al-Hadara Al-Arabiya” – (2004)

=== Plays ===
- Al-Metaf [The Coat], (2003).

=== Anthologies ===
- “Armando’s Virtuous Crime” – “Disruption: New Short Fiction from Africa” – “Catalyst Press” – USA – (September 2021)
- “Aljadaa Salha” – “The American Way” – “Comma Press” – UK – (August 2021)
- "Artistic Suicide” –ArabLit Magazine – (2021)
- “The Eid” – “Circle, Surface, Sun: from somewhere in the Mediterranean” – Vienna – (2020)
- “The Fish Market” – Index on Censorship Magazine – (2020)
- "A Happy Accident" –ArabLit Magazine – (2020)
- “Where Are You Running to This Evening?” – Adi Magazine – (2019)
- "The Reeling City" – The Offing Magazine – (2019)
- "Run, George!", Words Without Borders Magazine – (2019)
- The Government Sea – ArabLit Magazine – (2019)
- “Return Ticket” – “Banthology: Stories from Unwanted Nations” – “Comma Press” – UK – (2018)
- “His Excellency the Eminence of the Void” – Banipal Magazine – issue No. 40 about collection of Libyan Fiction – UK – (2011)
- “The Pools and the Piano” – "Beirut 39: New Writing from the Arab World" – “Bloomsbury” – USA – (2009)
- “The Spontaneous Journey” – “Translating Libya: In Search of the Libyan Short Story” – al-Saqi Books – UK – (2008)

== Awards ==
- “Armando’s Virtuous Crime” – longlisted in the Short Story Day Africa Prize – (2020)
- “Catalogue of a Private Life” – won the English PEN Translates award – (2019)
- "Soudfa Jariaa" (An Ongoing Coincidence) – longlisted in AlMultaqa Prize for the Arabic Short Story – (2019)
- “The Sharp Bend at Al-Bakur” – won the ArabLit Story Prize – (2019)
- The Banipal Visiting Writer Fellowship – St Aidan's College – University of Durham – (2018)
- "Zareeb Al-Abeed" (The Slave Yards) – shortlisted in the International Award for Arabic Fiction – (2017)
- “Beirut 39” – Hay Festival – she was chosen as one of the 39 best Arab authors under the age of 40 – (2009)
- "Waber Al Ahssina" (The Horses Hair) – "Best Arabic Novel Prize" at the Sudanese al-Begrawiya Festival in Khartoum – (2005)
- "Al Metaf" (The Coat) – the Sharjah Festival award of Arab Creativity – (2003)
