= Islam Samhan =

Jordanian poet of Palestinian origin (born 1981)

Islam Samhan (born 1981/82?) is a Jordanian poet of Palestinian origin. He was born in Amman where he is still based. His first collection of poems titled Graceful as a Shadow was published in 2007. He was accused of blasphemy for including phrases from the Quran in this volume, and was arrested as a result. He was later released. He has since published several more collections; two of his books have also been translated into Italian.

He was named by the Hay Festival as one of the Beirut39, a selection of the best young writers in the Arab world.
