= Hala Kawtharani =

Lebanese writer

Hala Kawtharani (Arabic: هالة كوثراني, born 1977) is a Lebanese writer. She was born in Beirut and studied at the American University of Beirut. Primarily a fiction writer, she was named as one of the Beirut39, a 2009 selection of the most promising young writers in the Arab world. Her major titles include "The Last Week" (2006), "Beirut Studio" (2008), "Ali Al-Amirikani" (2012) and "Charisma" ( 2014).
