= Wiam Al Madadi =

Moroccan writer

Wiam Al Madadi (born 1989) is a Moroccan writer. She is currently working towards her PhD in translation at Abdel Malik Al Saadi University in Tetouan. She is best known for her novel The Gypsy (2015) which is set in the aftermath of the 1990 Iraq War. The novel won the Tayeb Salih International Award for Creative Writing. She also writes short stories, several of which have won literary awards. In 2019, she took part in the IPAF Nadwa.
