= Saeed Al Yamani =

Bahraini academic and politician

- Occupations: Academic; politician

Saeed Ahmed Abdullah Hussein Al Yamani (Arabic: سعيد أحمد عبد الله حسين اليماني) is a Bahraini academic and politician. He was appointed to the Consultative Council, the nation's upper house of Parliament, in 2012.

== Career ==
Al Yamani received a Bachelor of Science for science education with an emphasis on biology and chemistry from Qatar University in 1981 and a Doctor of Education with an emphasis on Science Pedagogy from the University of Bath in the United Kingdom in 1988.

Al Yamani taught science at Abdul-Rahman al-Dakhil Boys School from 1981 to 1983. He later became an assistant professor at Arabian Gulf University, where he taught full-time from 1988 to 1992, part-time from 1992 to 2000, and as an associate professor from 2000 to 2012. He has remained on staff part-time since his appointment to the Consultative (or Shura) Council in 2012. He worked part-time as an assistant professor at the University of Bahrain from 1991 to 1992 and was promoted to assistant professor there, where he served until 1997.

Al Yamani worked as a financial advisor at Eagle Star Insurance from 1997 to 1998, then in a senior position there from 1999 to 2000, in between serving as a sales manager at Arabia Insurance from 1998 to 1999. He served as Director of Clubs Affairs at the General Organization for Youth and Sports from 2004 to 2007. In 2012, he was appointed to the Shura Council to succeed Salah bin Ali Mohammed Abdulrahman upon the latter's appointment as Minister of State for Human Rights.
