= Ibrahim Shihata =

Egyptian diplomat (1937–2001)

- Born: 1937; Cairo, Egypt
- Died: May 28, 2001 (aged 63); Washington D.C., United States
- Education: BA in Law, PhD in International Law
- Alma mater: Cairo University Law School, Harvard Law School
- Known for: Senior Vice President & General Counsel to the World Bank
- Spouse: Samia S Farid
- Children: 3 - Sharif Shihata, Yasmine Shihata, Nadia Shihata

Dr. Ibrahim F. I. Shihata (1937–2001) was an expert on international development and the Senior Vice President and General Counsel of the World Bank from 1983 to 2000.

== Early life and education ==
At the age of 20, Ibrahim Shihata graduated with a BA in law from Cairo University Law School at the top of his class. He originally planned to continue his education in the United States, but then received an offer from the Conseil d’Etat to work as a legal advisor in the Ministry of Health.

In the following year, he was moved to the technical bureau of the President of the Conseil. During Egypt and Syria's failed unification, he was seconded to the office of the President of the Republic. During his tenure, a senior official fell ill, and recommended Ibrahim Shihata take his place in drafting the constitution of the United Arab Republics. Although working full-time, he managed to complete two graduate diplomas, earning distinctions on both.

During his service with the then Unified Republic, Dr. Shihata was informed that he had been granted a scholarship for study in the United States. He had only applied to Harvard University, where he completed his PhD in International Law. He completed the degree in 1964, in just under 4 years. His professor spoke highly of his dissertation, stating that the paper increased the value of a PhD degree from Harvard, and the value of the university as a whole.

== Early professional career ==
Upon completion of his PhD, Dr. Shihata returned to Egypt to teach at Ain Shams University at both undergraduate and graduate levels. Two years later, he was offered a position to work as Legal Counsel of the Kuwait Fund for Arab Economic development. He worked as legal counsel in the role, based in Kuwait, for eight years.

== The OPEC Fund for International Development ==
Dr. Shihata was appointed as Director General of the then OPEC Special Fund at its creation in 1976. Under his leadership, the OPEC Special Fund developed into the long-standing institution that is known as today—the OPEC Fund for International Development. During his tenure, Dr. Shihata was known for his contribution towards addressing the issue of poverty, primarily in the southern areas of the world.

While working at the OPEC Fund, Dr Shihata also served as an Executive Director at the International Fund for Agricultural Development. He was the first Chairman of the International Development Law Institute he contributed establishing in 1983.

== World Bank ==
In 1983, Dr Shihata was appointed as Senior Vice President & General Counsel for the World Bank and Secretary-General of the International Center for Settlement of Investment Disputes (ICSID). He was handpicked by then President, Tom Clawsen, and was the first person from a developing country to be appointed to the position.

Dr. Shihata is most well known for his creation of the Multilateral Investment Guarantee Agency (MIGA) Organisation. Founded in 1985, the purpose of the organization was to encourage direct foreign investment to developing countries for economic development, while providing insurance against non-commercial risks such as war and famine. He made a significant contribution to the Global Environment Facility (GEF) a joint program with the United Nations that promoted environmentally friendly development. He was responsible for the expansion of the International Center for Settlement of Investment Disputes (ICSID). During his 17-year tenure at the World Bank, Dr. Shihata developed these organizations into world-renowned entities. Dr. Shihata was known for his achievements as general counsel, and the numerous books and articles he authored on the World Bank, international law and international economics. They include The World Bank Legal Papers, The World Bank Inspection Panel: in practice, The MIGA and foreign investment, among others. He wrote his famous book (in Arabic) about Egypt, Waseyati Li Beladi (My Will for My Country), which analyzed Egypt's major problems at the time and predicted the Egyptian Revolution.

== Retirement and death ==
Dr. Ibrahim Shihata retired in 2000 as Senior Vice-President and Special Adviser to the World Bank's President. On May 28, 2001, Dr. Ibrahim Shihata died in Washington D.C., from complications due to liver disease.
