= Ziad Khaddash =

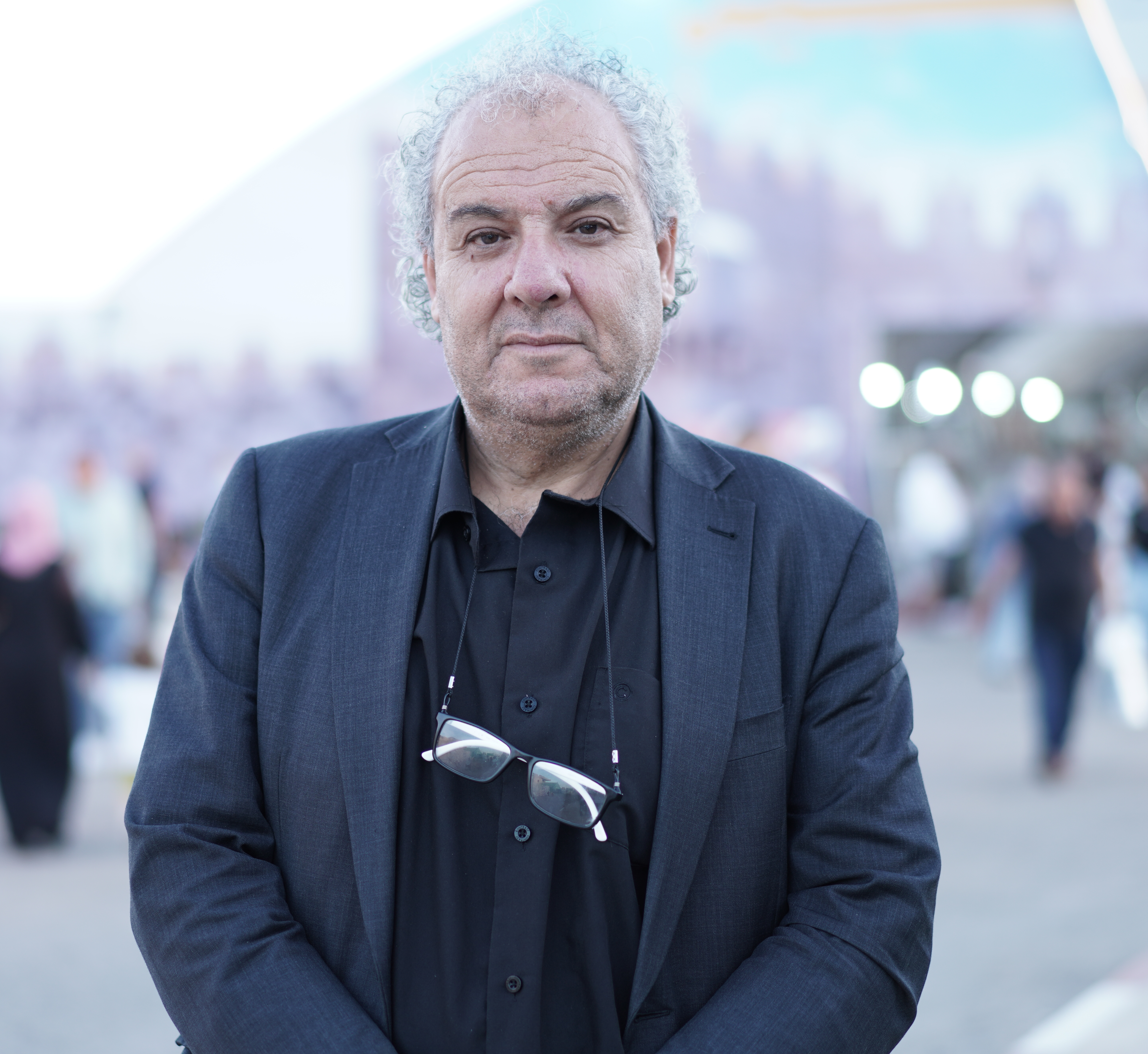
- Born: 28 June 1964 (age 61); Jerusalem
- Occupations: Author, short story writers, school teacher
- Known for: Writing

Ziad Khaddash (Arabic: زياد خداش) is a Palestinian short-story writer, born in Jerusalem in 1964. He has twelve short story collections in his credit. He works as a teacher of creative writing in Ramallah schools. He received the Appreciation Award for the State of Palestine, and was qualified for the short list in the Literary Forum competition for the Arabic story in Kuwait for the year 2015.

== Biography ==
Khaddash works as a teacher of the Arabic language. He participated in festivals and literary events in several countries like the World Story Forum in Istanbul, Bashir Talmudi Cultural Festival in Tunisia, International Poetry Festival in Manama, He also participated in several story nights in Dubai, Casablanca, Tunis and Beirut.

== Published works ==
- نوما هادئا يا رام الله, Have a good night's sleep, Ramallah (1993)
- خذيني آلة موتي, Take me my death machine (1996)
- الشرفات ترحل ايضاً, Balconies go too (1999)
- كأن شخصا ثالثا كان بيننا, As if there was a third person among us (2000)
- شتاء ثقيل وامراة خفيفة, Heavy winter and light woman (2021)
- أوقات جميلة لاخطائنا النضرة, Beautiful times for our fresh mistakes (2022)
- خطأ النادل, waiter's fault (2006)
- أسباب رائعة للبكاء, Great reasons to cry (2015)

== Awards ==
- Winner of the Palestine Prize for Literature in 2015.
