= Laila Abdullah =

Omani writer (born 1982)

- ليلة عبدالله
- Born: 1982 (39-40 years)
- Occupations: Writer, poet, and critic
- Writing career
- Pen name: Laila Al Balooshi
- Language: Arabic
- Notable works: Aimless Silence, Farho's Notebooks

Laila Abdullah (Arabic: ليلة عبدالله) (born 1982) is an Omani writer, poet, and critic living in the UAE. She is known for her novel revolving upon children's life in war, Farho's Notebooks.

== Career ==
Abdullah used to write a blog titled Breathing Slowly. and a weekly column in some Omani and Arab newspapers including Emirati and Omani newspapers AlRoeya, and London newspaper Al-Arab.

She has a number of published works including poetry, children literature, literary studies, and short story collections, and her poetical works were translated into several languages including Polish and Spanish.

She started her career off with free verse poetry, but later on she leaned more towards storytelling.

== List of Publications ==
Absurd Silence	Her Ninth Heart
Farho's Notebooks	Sofa, a Book, a Cup of Coffee
Children's Literature in the UAE	Presumed Love Letters between Henry Miller and Annaise Nin
The Qualms of the World Chamber	My Storytelling Creatures

== Awards ==
- The Qualms of the Room of the Worlds (هواجس غرفة العالم - 2014) - 2015 Best Essay Edition Award in Muscat
- My Storytelling Creatures (كائناتي السردية - 2015) - 2016 Best Short Story Book Award in Muscat
- Farho's Notebooks (2018 - دفاتر فارهو) - shortlisted for Sheikh Zayed Book Award in 2019

== Reviews ==
Talib Al-Rafai expressed in his article how Laila Abdullah tends to show knowledge upon a novel's dimension, and recognizing the elements of a fiction scene, delivering portrayals of Arab and Western Citizens through the landscape she expresses in the novel.

Additionally, a review in Independent Arabia discusses how in Farho's Notebooks, Abdullah's narrative transfers through different forms of storytelling, one that is inclined towards the beginning, becoming heavy throughout the details upon the conflict of the novel, transferring to an ordinary form eventually to describe the course of a normal life.

== See also ==
- Sheikh Zayed Book Award
- Children's literature
