= Moses Obimbo Madadi =

Moses Obimbo Madadi is a Kenyan clinician - scientist, researcher, and educator. He is Professor and Chairman of the Department of Human Anatomy and Medical Physiology at the University of Nairobi; and serves as an obstetrician and gynaecologist at The Kenyatta National Hospital. Obimbo is also the Honorary Secretary of The Kenya Obstetrical and Gynaecological Society.

He also serves as acting Associate Dean - Faculty of Health Sciences in acting capacity at the University of Nairobi and Principal Investigator at – Basic, Clinical and Translational (BCTr) Research Laboratory, and the Kenya Aids Vaccine Initiative, Institute of Clinical Research (KAVI – ICR).

In November 2021, Obimbo was awarded the Calestous Juma Science Leadership Fellow by the Bill and Melinda Gates Foundation "to develop tools to study the vaginal microbiome and metabolites during pregnancy." Furthermore, he holds the position of Editor-in-Chief for the Journal of Obstetrics and Gynaecology for Eastern and Central Africa (JOGECA).

== Early life and education ==
He obtained a Bachelor of Medicine and Bachelor of Surgery (MBChB) degree from the University of Nairobi in 2006. He furthered his education by acquiring a Postgraduate Diploma in Accreditation of Laboratory Animal Science Education from Uppsala University in 2008. Afterwards, Obimbo pursued a Master of Science in Human Anatomy from the University of Nairobi and later a Master of Medicine in Obstetrics and Gynaecology at the same university, completing it in 2016. He had earned a PhD degree in Human Anatomy in 2014. He studied the anatomy of the uterine vascular system and the impact of HIV and antiretrovirals on the placental milieu from the University of Nairobi in 2014.

In 2016, Obimbo pursued a Postdoctoral fellowship as a Fogarty Global Health Fellow at the University of California Global Health Institute, expanding his expertise in global health issues and research methodologies. Subsequently, in 2017, he engaged in another Postdoctoral fellowship with the Preterm Birth Initiative at the University of California, San Francisco, concentrating on addressing the critical issue of preterm birth.

== Career and research ==
From 2007 to 2010, Obimbo served as a Tutorial Fellow in the Department of Human Anatomy at The University of Nairobi, before transitioning into a dual role as a lecturer in Obstetrics and Gynaecology and Human Anatomy in 2011. Concurrently, he expanded his educational reach by serving as a Part-time Lecturer at Kenyatta University. From 2016 to date, Obimbo transitioned to clinical practice as a specialist Obstetrician and Gynaecologist and a researcher. He later transitioned to the role of Research Scholar at the Centre of Reproductive Sciences, University of California San Francisco (UCSF) in 2017, under the mentorship of faculty members Professor Susan Fisher and Professor Craig Cohen. Additionally, Obimbo has been the Principal Investigator at the Basic, Clinical, and Translational laboratory – Placenta Lab since 2018.

Presently, he holds the position of Professor and Chair of the Department of Human Anatomy and Medical Physiology at the University of Nairobi. In this capacity, he oversees academic programs and research endeavors. After being awarded the Calestous Juma Leadership Fellowship in 2021, Obimbo is investigating vaginal tract infections, pathways associated with the deranged vaginal microbiome and metabolomics, to help identify predictive biomarkers and intervention strategies for improving pregnancy outcomes in Kenya. These data will be used to develop artificial intelligence-assisted prediction models that could be used as valuable screening tools to identify at-risk pregnancies for early interventions.

In his pursuit of excellence in women's health, he led a team in successfully launching the world's first-ever Postpartum Hemorrhage awareness run—'Run for Her'—held in Nairobi. This groundbreaking initiative was designed to raise awareness of postpartum hemorrhage, the leading threat to maternal health. The event has since gained both regional and international traction.

== Awards and honours ==
- Calestous Juma Science Leadership Fellowship, 2021–2026
- Preterm Birth Initiative, University of California San Francisco, 2017
- GloCal Health Fellowship from University of California Global Health Institute at the University of California San Francisco, 2016 -2017
- International Mentored Scientist Award in HIV/AIDS from the University of California San Francisco, Fall 2014/2015
- John J. Sciarra IJGO Prize Paper Award Honorable mention 2010. Best clinical research article from low/middle income country

== Publications ==
1. Lwamulungi, E.; Qureshi, Z.; Obimbo, M.; Ogutu, O.; Cheserem, E.; Kosgei, R. J.; Walong, E.; Inyangala, D.; Nyakundi, G. G.; Ndavi, P. M.; Osoti, A. O.; Ondieki, D. K.; Pulei, A. N.; Njoroge, A.; Masyuko, S.; Wachira, C. M. (2023). "Placental characteristics and neonatal weights among women with malaria-preeclampsia comorbidity and healthy pregnancies". PLOS ONE. 18 (10) e0291172. doi:10.1371/journal.pone.0291172. PMC 10586625. PMID 37856468.
2. Anangwe, D.; Obimbo, M. M.; Ongidi, I. H.; Gichangi, P. B. (2023). "Reversible effect of castration induced hypogonadism on the morphology of the left coronary arteries in adult male rabbits". Anatomy & Cell Biology. 57 (1): 61–69. doi:10.5115/acb.23.196. PMC 10968183. PMID 38030134.
3. Omosa-Manyonyi, G. S.; De Kam, M.; Tostmann, A.; Masido, M. A.; Nyagah, N.; Obimbo, M. M.; Van Der Ven, A. J.; Oever, J. T. (2023). "Evaluation and optimization of the syndromic management of female genital tract infections in Nairobi, Kenya". BMC Infectious Diseases. 23 (1): 547. doi:10.1186/s12879-023-08442-2. PMC 10463802. PMID 37608250.
4. Obimbo, Moses; Omanwa, Kireki (2023). "Rhesus isoimmunization: An underappreciated reproductive risk". Journal of Obstetrics and Gynaecology of Eastern and Central Africa. 35 (2): 74. doi:10.59692/jogeca.v35i2.36.
5. Karau, Paul Bundi; Odula, Paul; Obimbo, Moses; Ihunwo, Amadi Ogonda; Nkomozepi, Pilani; Karau, Muriira (2024). "Changes in Glial Fibrillary Acidic Protein-Immunoreactive Astrocytes in the Prefrontal Cortex of the Male Rat following Chronic Khat Use". Journal of Microscopy and Ultrastructure. 12 (2): 75–80. doi:10.4103/jmau.jmau_26_22. PMC 11245132. PMID 39006043.
6. Kobia, Francis M.; Maiti, Kaushik; Obimbo, Moses M.; Smith, Roger; Gitaka, Jesse (2022). "Potential pharmacologic interventions targeting TLR signaling in placental malaria". Trends in Parasitology. 38 (7): 513–524. doi:10.1016/j.pt.2022.04.002. PMC 7614649. PMID 35537977.
7. Gesaka, S. R.; Obimbo, M. M.; Wanyoro, A. (2022). "Coronavirus disease 2019 and the placenta: A literature review". Placenta. 126: 209–223. doi:10.1016/j.placenta.2022.07.007. PMC 9293390. PMID 35872511.
8. Otieno, Mohamed; Ndung'u, Bernard; Kigera, James; Kaisha, Wycliffe; Kimanthi, Cyrus; Obimbo, Moses (2022). "Morphometry of Placentae of Anaemic and Non-anaemic Preeclamptic Patients". International Journal of Medical Students. doi:10.5195/ijms.2022.1748.
9. Kabare, Gloria; Muthuuri, Nikita; Sarna, Krishan; Gwala, Fidel; Amuti, Thomas; Olabu, Beda; Obimbo, Moses; Ogeng'o, Julius (2022). "Perception and challenges of health science students toward e-learning in a Sub-Saharan African country: A multi-institutional study". Annals of African Surgery. 19: 16–22. doi:10.4314/aas.v19i1.4.
10. Singoei, M.; Obimbo, M. M.; Odula, P. O.; Gitaka, J.; Ongidi, I. H. (2021). "Changes in the structure of chorioamniotic membrane in patients with malaria in pregnancy". Placenta. 114: 42–49. doi:10.1016/j.placenta.2021.08.054. PMID 34425402.
