= Nasser al-Dhaheri =

Emirati writer and journalist

- ناصر الظاهري
- Born: United Arab Emirates
- Occupations: Writer, journalist
- Writing career
- Language: Arabic

Nasser al-Dhaheri (Arabic: ناصر الظاهري; born 1960) is an Emirati writer and journalist.

== Early life and education ==
He was born in al-Ain, Abu Dhabi in the United Arab Emirates. He was educated in the UAE and in France. He has published several volumes of fiction and non-fiction, including short story collections and novels.

== Career ==
As a journalist, he has been involved with a number of publications, such as al-Ittihad newspaper, Fairuz magazine, al-Idari magazine, and Faris magazine. He is the publisher and chief editor of Hudhud, an electronic newspaper which appears in Arabic, English, French and Spanish.

In 2009, al-Dhaheri was a participant in the inaugural IPAF Nadwa. His work has appeared in English translation in Banipal magazine.
