= Moaid Allami =

Iraqi journalist

Moaid Allami مؤيد اللامي
- Born: Amarah, Iraq
- Education: University of Baghdad
- Occupation(s): Journalist, president of the Federation of Journalists of Iraq

Moaid Aziz Allami (Arabic: مؤيد اللامي) (born in Amarah) is an Iraqi journalist and president of the Federation of Journalists of Iraq. He holds a BA degree from Baghdad University. In 2010, he was elected a member of the Executive Committee of the International Federation of Journalists in Spain, and is currently President of the General Federation of Arab Journalists.

== See also ==
- Federation of Journalists of Iraq
- International Federation of Journalists
