= Sara al-Jarwan =

Sara al-Jarwan (Arabic: سارة الجروان; born 1969) is an Emirati novelist, short story writer and playwright. Born in Ajman, she joined the UAE armed forces as a soldier just before the 1991 Gulf War. This experience was the basis of a book (Yawmiyaat Mujannada or Diary of a Recruit) as well as a play. She also served as an editor of Dara al-Watan, the magazine of the armed forces.

She is regarded as the first Emirati woman to have published a novel (Shajan Bint Al-Qadar Al-Hazeen, published in 1992). Since then, she has written three more novels, a short story collection, and a book of Emirati folk tales. She has won several awards including the Best Emirati Book prize in 2003 and the Al Owais Prize for best novel in 2012.

She was a participant in the 2012 IPAF Nadwa. Her work has appeared in translation in Banipal magazine.

== Novels ==
- n Bint Al Qadar Al Hazin, Sharjah, 1992 (novel)
- Ayqounat Al Hilm (The Dream’s Icon), Dar Al-Shurooq, Amman, 2003 (short stories, winner of Best Emirati Book award)
- Risa’il ’Ila Al Sultan (Letters to the Sultan), Dar Al-Shurooq, Amman, 2003 (novel)
- Turous ’Ila Moulay Al-Sultan, Al-Kitab Al-Awwal (Letters to My Lord The Sultan, Part One), Dar Al-Adab, Beirut, 2009 (novel)
- ‘Udhraa’ wa Wali wa Saahir (A Virgin, a Saint and a Magician), Arab Scientific Publishers Inc, Beirut, 2011 (novel, winner of Al-Owais Prize)
