= Mohammad Rabie =

Egyptian writer (born 1978)

Mohammad Rabie (born 1978) is an Egyptian writer. He studied civil engineering in Higher Technological Institute. His novel Kawkab Anbar (2011) won the Sawiris Cultural Award in 2011. He has since published two more novels: Year of the Dragon (2012) and Otared (2014). Otared was nominated for the International Prize for Arabic Fiction in 2016.

Rabie was also a participant at the 2012 International Prize for Arabic Fiction Nadwa, an annual workshop for promising young Arab writers.
