= Ahmad Yamani =

Egyptian poet and translator

- أحمد يماني
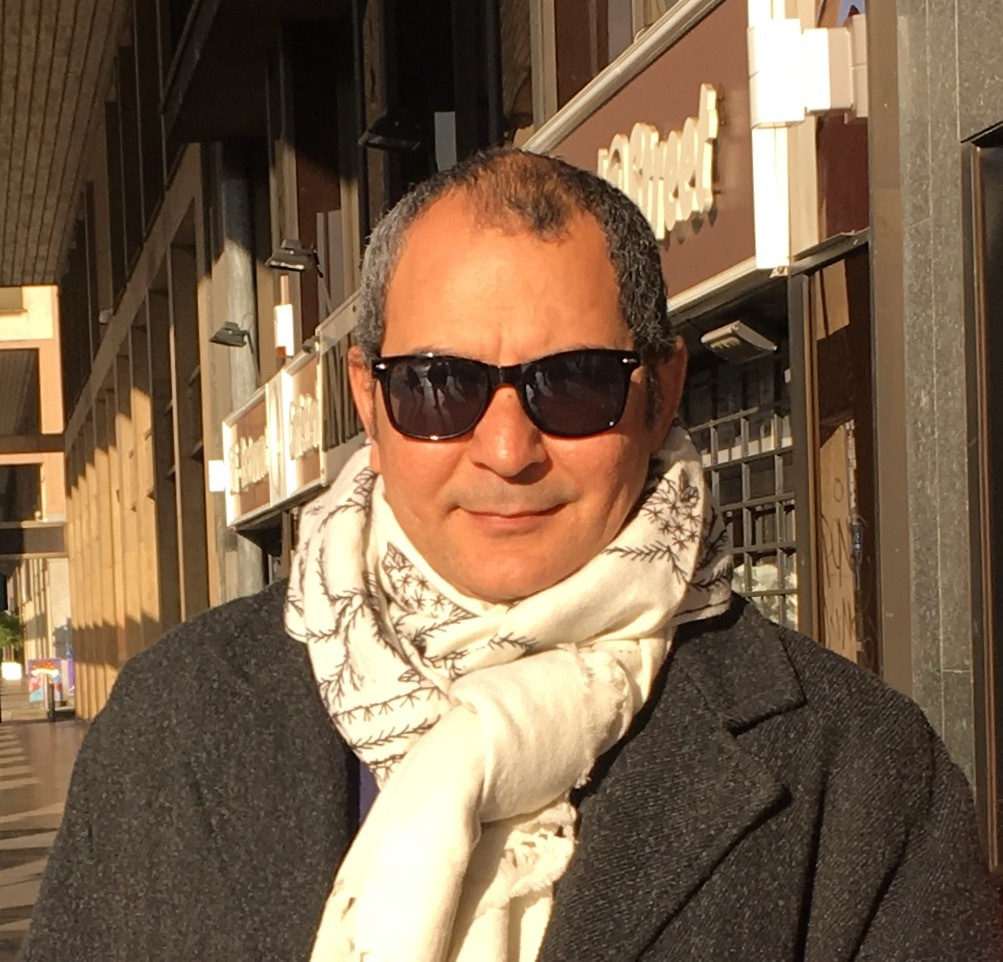
- Born: 1970 (age 55–56); Egypt
- Occupations: poet, writer, translator, broadcaster

Ahmad Yamani (Arabic: أحمد يماني; born 1970, Cairo) is an Egyptian poet and translator. He graduated from Cairo University in 1992 and got his PhD in Arabic philology from Complutense University in Madrid. He now lives in Spain where he works at the broadcaster RTVE.

Clarissa C. Burt, writing the Journal of Arabic Literature, classifies Yamani as a "nineties poet". She wrote "...his work is gross, revolting, disturbing, abusive, even as it reveals occasional remarkable turns of phrase, and inspired use of poetic tools."

Youssef Rakha, writing in The Kenyon Review, characterized the poetry of Yamani and the other young nineties poets as posing a political challenge to followers of Gamal Abdel Nasser (1918-1970), the influential Egyptian leader.

He has published several books of poetry in Arabic, and one in his adopted language Spanish. Yamani has translated numerous Spanish-language writers into Arabic, among them José Ángel Valente, Rubén Darío, César Vallejo, Adolfo Bioy Casares, Miguel Casado, Rosendo Tello, Ángel Guinda, Agustín Porras, and Roberto Bolaño.

In 2010, he was named as one of the Beirut39, a selection of the best young writers in the Arab world. Samuel Shimon devoted a chapter of his 2012 book, Beirut39: New Writing from the Arab World, to Yamani, publishing English translations of eight of his poems.

== Poetry collections ==
- 2013 Montasaf al-huyuraat
- 2008 Amaken jati’a
- 2001 Wardat fi’l-raás
- 1998 Tahta shagara-t al-aíla
- 1995 Shawaria al-ábyad wa’l-áswad
- 2015 Refugio de huesos (in Spanish)
- Various authors (2023). Jarquín, Carlos Javier (ed.). Canto planetario: hermandad en la Tierra. Costa Rica: HC Editores. ISBN 979-8850092115.
