= Sawiris Cultural Award =

Egyptian literary prize

The Sawiris Cultural Award is an Egyptian literary prize, awarded annually by the Sawiris Foundation for Social Development. It was inaugurated in 2005 with prizes in two categories: novels and short stories. Since then, additional categories in screenplays and playwriting have been added. Each award is also divided into two sub-categories: senior writers and junior writers.

== Winners ==
=== 2023 ===
A Tale of a Feather and a Fish" (Hekayet Reesha we Samaka) won the Best Script Award for Established Writers. It was written by Ibrahim El-Batout and Ahmed El-Hawarey.

=== 2022 ===
Novel

- Abel Assad Merry, The Fabric threads of the Self
- Mohamed Abu-Zeid, A Spider in the Heart

Short Stories

- Ossama Habachi, Try not to see me
- Mohamed Abdel-Naby, Once Upon A Time

=== 2021 ===
==== Novel ====
- Ahmad Al Mallawani

=== 2011 (7th round) ===
==== Novel ====
- Ibrahim Abdel-Meguid, In Every Week There Is a Friday, Senior Writers
- Mohammed Rabie, Amber Planet, Young Writers / First Place
- Mohamed Salah al-Azab, Sidi Barani, Young Writers / Second Place

==== Short stories ====
- Ahmed El-Khamissi, Canary, Senior Writers
- Tareq Imam, The Story of a Man: Whenever He Dreams of a City, He Dies In It, Young Writers / First Place
- Sherif Saleh, Love Triangle, Young Writers / Second Place

==== Screenplay ====
- none awarded in Senior Writers category
- Mohammed Salah al-Azab, Two-Bedroom Apartment (adapted from the original novel by Ibrahim Aslan), Young Writers

==== Playwriting ====
- Imad Motawie, Insomniacs

=== 2010 (6th round) ===
==== Novel ====
- Ahmed Sabry Abul-Futuh, The Saraswa Epic: Genesis, Volume 1, Senior Writers
- Al-Taher Sharkawi, Vanilla, Young Writers / First Place
- Manal El-Sayed, The Singing of the Crazy, Young Writers / Second Place
- Mohamed Maarouf, The Boat Cleopatra, Young Writers / Second Place

=== Short stories ===
- Mahmoud El-Wardani, A Morning Party, Senior Writers
- Mohamed Abdel-Nabi, Anton Chekov’s Ghost, Young Writers / First Place
- Mohamed Khair, Ghosts of the Radio, Young Writers / Second Place
- Ahmed Hemdan, The Delegation, Young Writers / Second Place

=== 2009 ===
==== Novel ====
- Montaser El-Qafash, Masaalet Waqt, Senior Writers
- Reem Basyouni, Dr. Hanaa, Young Writers / First Place
- Hani Abel-Moreed, Kirialison, Young Writers / Second Place

==== Short stories ====
- Hanaa Attia, Onf Al-Zel, Senior Writers
- Muhammad Fathy, Begwar Ragol A’refaho, Young Writers / First Place
- Hasan Kamal Mahmoud, Koshari Masr, Young Writers / Second Place

==== Screenplay ====
- Esam Helmy Rahim, Niran Sadiqa, Senior Writers
- Ahmad Nabil Tawfik, El-Feel El-Nono El-Ghalabawi, Young Writers

==== Playwriting ====
- Mansour Mekawy, Ekhnatoun
- Ahmad Al-Attar, El-Hayah Helwa

=== 2008 ===
==== Novel ====
- Muhammad Albosaty, Daq Altubool, Senior Writers
- Hedra Gerges Zakhari, Mawaqeet Alta’ari, Young Writers / First Place
- Tareq Imam, Hedo’a Alkatalah, Young Writers / Second Place

==== Short stories ====
- Hossam Ahmed Fakhr, Hekayat Amina, Senior Writers
- Sherif M. Abdelmeguid Saleh, Khadamat Mabad Al Bayie, Young Writers / First Place
- Basma M. Abd el Aziz, Alashan Rabena Ysahel, Young Writers / Second Place

==== Screenplay ====
- Hasan Abdel-Rahman (El Nouni), Al Gotha Raqam 13, Senior Writers
- Gyhan Seliman, Al nouras valentine, Young Writers

=== 2007 ===
==== Novel ====
- Muhammad Youssef AlQaeed, Qesmat Alghorama’a, Senior Writers
- Ahmad Abou Khnegar, Elamma Okht Alrigal, Young Writers / First Place
- Ehab Abd el hamid, Oshaq kha’eboon, Young Writers / Second Place

==== Short stories ====
- Muhammad Kamal, Aqasis Masrya, Senior Writers
- Gamal Zaki Maqar, Sefr Altufula Wa Nassri Wa Al homar, Senior Writers
- Mohammed Okasha, Asdaa Bela Aswat, Young Writers / First Place
- Eman Abd el Hamid, Mohawalat leltakhafy, Young Writers / Second Place
- Alaa Ahmad Abou zaid, Al haffah, Young Writers / Second Place

==== Screenplay ====
- Dawood Abdelsayed Dawood, Rasa’al Albahr, Senior Writers
- Gamal Sedki Youssef, Al Hayat Helwa, Senior Writers
- Mariam Na3om, Wahd/Sefr, Young Writers

=== 2006 ===
==== Novel ====
- Muhammad Almansi Qandil, Kamar Ali Samarqand, Senior Writers
- Hamdi Algazzar, Sehr Aswad, Young Writers / First Place
- Ahmad Alaidi, An Takon Abbas Alabd, Young Writers / Second place

==== Short stories ====
- Ibrahim Aslan, Hekayat Men Fadlallah Othman, Senior Writers
- Mustafa Zekry, Mera’at 202, Young Writers / First Place
- Wael Elashry, Sa’am New York, Young Writers / Second Place

=== 2005 ===
==== Novel ====
- Haggag Hasan Adol, Ma3touk El kheir, Senior Writers
- Yasser Abd el latif, Qanoun Elweratha, Young Writers / 1st Place
- Hasan Abd el mawgoud, Ain Al kott, Young Writers / 2nd Place

==== Short stories ====
- Mohammed Al Makhzangy, Awtar Al maa, Senior Writers
- Haytham Alwardany, Gam3at Aladab Alnaqis, Young Writers / 1st Place
- Nessma Youssef Edrees, Malek Wala Ketaba, Young Writers / 2nd Place
