= Abdallah Salim Bawazir =

Sheikh Abdallah Salim Bawazir (Arabic: عبد الله سالم باوزير; March 30, 1938 – October 7, 2004) was a renowned Yemeni novelist, short story writer, columnist and author. He was born in the town of Ghayl Bawazir into the Abbasid Mashaikh Bawazir tribe in Hadhramaut province. He finished his formal schooling at the age of 16 and, due to his family's poverty, went off to Aden in search of work. He worked there for several years in various commercial stores before returning to Hadhramaut in 1962. However his stay in Mukalla, the capital of Hadhramaut, proved short-lived and he went back to Aden in 1963, working as manager of a well-known commercial store for the next 33 years. In 1997, he tried one more time to settle down in Mukalla but this attempt too proved unsuccessful. He went back to Aden for the last time to live out the final years of his life.

Bawazir was a prolific author and worked across a range of genres including short stories, novels, plays, children's books, and autobiography, not to mention shorter journalistic pieces for newspapers and magazines. As early as the 1950s, he was writing a column in Angham (Melodies) magazine. His first published short story entitled "Hikaya" (A Tale) came out in 1961 in the pages of Al-Taliyaa, an Mukalla newspaper. Another of his stories for Al-Taliyaa entitled "The Devil's Tree" was eventually included in the national school curriculum. Al-Taliyaa also published his first play Al-Muhakama (The Trial) in 1962. His works heavily reflected the turbulent social and political scene of the 1960s.

His first collection of short stories was called Al-Rimal al-Dhahabiya (The Golden Sands) and was published in 1965, bringing together stories that had previously appeared in various newspapers in Mukalla and Aden. His second collection was called Thawrat al-Burkan (The Eruption, 1968). He published several more short story collections throughout his career, the last one coming out in 1999. Bawazir is considered one of the pioneers of the short story format in Yemen.

His many other books included novels, journalistic compilations, collections of plays and books for children. He also wrote a three-volume autobiography that was released posthumously in 2007. Bawazir died on October 7, 2004, at the age of 66 and was buried in Aden.

Bawazir's work has been translated into Italian and was included in a 2009 anthology on Yemeni literature called Perle dello Yemen.
