= Muhammad Abdallah Muthanna =

Yemeni author and playwright

Muhammad Abdallah Muthanna (born 1945 or 1947) is a Yemeni novelist, playwright and short story writer.

He was born in Hudaida and was educated in Cairo. In the 1970s, he was jailed several times by the authorities for his activities as a political dissident. He has worked in journalism as well as in government.

He is a prolific writer of fiction and drama and is well known for his short stories, which have been translated into English and Italian. His first collection of stories, entitled Fi giawf al-layl (In the Heart of the Night), came out in 1976. Subsequent collections include Al-jabal yabtasim aydan (1978) and Rihlat al-umr (2002). In 1990, he won an Arabic short story award presented in Alexandria, Egypt.
