= Ali Ghadeer =

Iraqi writer and journalist

Ali Ghadeer (Arabic: علي غدير) (born Jan. 1st 1971) is an Iraqi writer and journalist. He studied military science at a military college, and obtained his BA in 1993. As a journalist, he has worked for a number of Iraqi news outlets. He has published several books till date, including short stories, poetry and a novel.

In 2011, he was chosen to participate in the third IPAF Nadwa, a writers' workshop in Abu Dhabi, held under the aegis of the International Prize for Arabic Fiction and Sheikh Hamdan bin Zayed Al-Nahyan.
