= Reem Bassiouney =

Egyptian writer

Reem A. Bassiouney
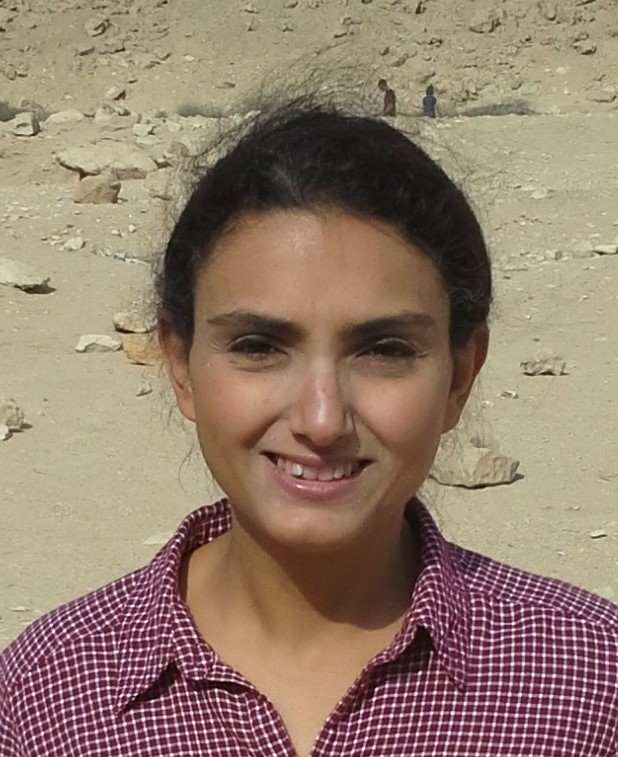
- Born: March 6, 1973; Alexandria, Egypt
- Occupation: Professor
- Notable work: Dr. Hanaa, The Mumluk Trilogy, Fountain of the Drowning, Ibn Tulun Trilogy
- Awards: Sawiris Cultural Award, King Fahd Center for Middle East and Islamic Studies Translation of Arabic Literature Award, Naguib Mahfouz Award, National Prize for Excellence in Literature, Sheikh Zaid Award, and an honorary degree from Cape Breton University for her significant contributions to culture, history, and society

Reem Bassiouney (Egyptian Arabic: ريم بسيونى Rīm Basyūni [ɾiːm bæsˈjuːni]; March 6, 1973) is an Egyptian author, professor of sociolinguistics and Chair Department of Applied Linguistics and Education at The American University in Cairo. Bassiouney is the editor of the Routledge Series of Language and Identity. She is also the editor and creator of the journal Arabic Sociolinguistics Edinburgh. She has written several novels and a number of short stories and won the 2009 Sawiris Foundation Literary Prize for Young Writers for her novel Dr. Hanaa. While much of her fiction has yet to be translated into English, her novel The Pistachio Seller was published by Syracuse University Press in 2009, and won the 2009 King Fahd Center for Middle East and Islamic Studies Translation of Arabic Literature Award. Bassiouney also won Naguib Mahfouz Award from Egypt's Supreme Council for Culture in the best Egyptian novel category for her novel Sons of the People: The Mamluk Trilogy. She was also the winner of the National Prize for Excellence in Literature of the year 2022 from the Egyptian Ministry of Culture. Bassiouney won the Sheikh Zaid Literature Award for her novel Al Halwani: The Fatimid Trilogy in 2024. Reem Bassiouney is the first Egyptian woman to earn her MA (1998) and PhD (2002) in linguistics from Oxford University in the UK, the first linguist to write a book on Arabic sociolinguistics in 2009, titled "Arabic Sociolinguistics” and covering topics such as gender, variation, politics, language policy, code switching, and diglossia, and the first woman to win the Naguib Mahfouz Literature Award from Egypt's Supreme Council for Culture in 2020. Bassiouney was awarded an honorary degree by Cape Breton University for her significant contributions to culture, history, and society.

The Times Literary Supplement wrote of Bassiouney’s Al-Qata’i: Ibn Tulun’s City Without Walls that "the Egyptian author Reem Bassiouney has made a name for herself with a series of popular historical novels that bring sweeping and vivid life to this story. Having already written about the late-nineteenth-century and Mamluk eras of Cairo – the two periods that have done the most to define the city before the current one – Bassiouney now turns her attention to a more obscure, obliterated period of Egypt’s history....As in the coffeehouses of old Cairo, where the medieval epics were recited until the last century, the pleasure here is to be found in the storytelling itself ..." (Times Literary Supplement).

== Education and career ==
Reem Bassiouney was born in Alexandria in 1973. She attended El Nasr Girls' College, and studied English literature at Alexandria University. After graduating, she was appointed at the University, but decided to pursue her studies abroad. She was accepted for a graduate degree in linguistics at the University of Oxford, where she became a member of Somerville College. She obtained her doctorate from the University of Oxford, and worked briefly in the UK, before moving to the United States, where she was appointed professor of linguistics at the University of Utah. From there she moved to Georgetown University and then returned to her native Egypt when she joined the faculty of The American University in Cairo in 2013.

She has written several fictional works and multiple books on Arabic linguistics/sociolinguistics.

== Awards and Honours ==
- Sawiris Cultural Award (2010, for Professor Hanaa)
- King Fahd Center for Middle East and Islamic Studies Translation of Arabic Literature Award (for The Pistachio Seller)
- Naguib Mahfouz Award (2020, for Sons of the People: The Mamluk Trilogy)
- National Prize for Excellence in Literature (2022)
- Sheikh Zayed Book Award (2024, for Al-Qata'i: Ibn Tulun's City Without Walls)
- Honorary Doctorate (2025, from Cape Breton University)

== Bibliography ==
=== Fiction ===
- The Smell of the Sea, 2005. رائحة البحر.
- The Pistachio Seller, 2007. بائع الفستق. English translation, 2009. Winner of the 2009 King Fahd Center for Middle East and Islamic Studies Translation of Arabic Literature Award.
- Dr. Hanaa, 2008. دكتورة هناء. Winner of the 2009 Sawiris Foundation Literary Prize for Young Writers. English translation, 2011. Spanish and Greek translation.
- Love, Arab style, 2009. الحب على الطريقة العربية.
- Mortal Designs, 2010. أشياء رائعة.
- The Tour Guide, 2010. مرشد سياحي.
- Sons of the People: The Mamluk Trilogy, 2018. اولاد الناس: ثلاثية المماليك. Best seller and winner of the 2019- 2020 Naguib Mahfouz Award in the best Egyptian novel category from Egypt's Supreme. Council for Culture. English Translation, 2022
- Fountain of the Drowning: The Path of Land and Sea, 2020. سبيل الغارق الطريق والبحر. English Translation. (translated by Roger Allen as Al-Qata'i Ibn Tulun's City Without Walls)
- Ibn Tulun Trilogy, 2021 القطائع ثلاثية ابن طولون
- The Fatimid Trilogy, 2022 الحلواني ثلاثية الفاطميين Best seller and winner of Sheikh Zaid Literature Award (2024)
- Mario and Abu Al-Abbas, 2023 ماريو وأبو العباس
- The diver: Abu Hamid al-Ghazzali, 2024 الغواص: أبو حامد الغرالي
- Kom El Nour: Abbas Hilmi II, 2026 كوم النور عباس حلمي الثاني

=== Academic Books ===
- Functions of Code-Switching in Egypt, 2006.
- Arabic Sociolinguistics, 2009.
- Arabic and the Media: Linguistic Analyses and Applications, 2010. Edited volume.
- Arabic Language and Linguistics, 2012. Edited volume.
- Language and Identity in Modern Egypt, 2014.
- The Routledge Handbook of Arabic Linguistics, 2018. Edited volume.
- Identity and Dialect Performance A Study of Communities and Dialects, 2018. Edited volume.
- The Routledge Handbook of Arabic and Identity, 2020. Edited volume.
- The Pursuit of Happiness, 2023 البحث عن السعادة رحلة في الفكر الصوفي وأسرار اللغة
- ّIn the Company of Abu Hamid al-Ghazali: Purification of the Heart, 2025 برفقة أبو حامد الغزالي إصلاح القلب
- Facing the colonizer: The long-lost diaries of Abbas Hilmi II, 2026
