= Tarek Emam =

Egyptian writer

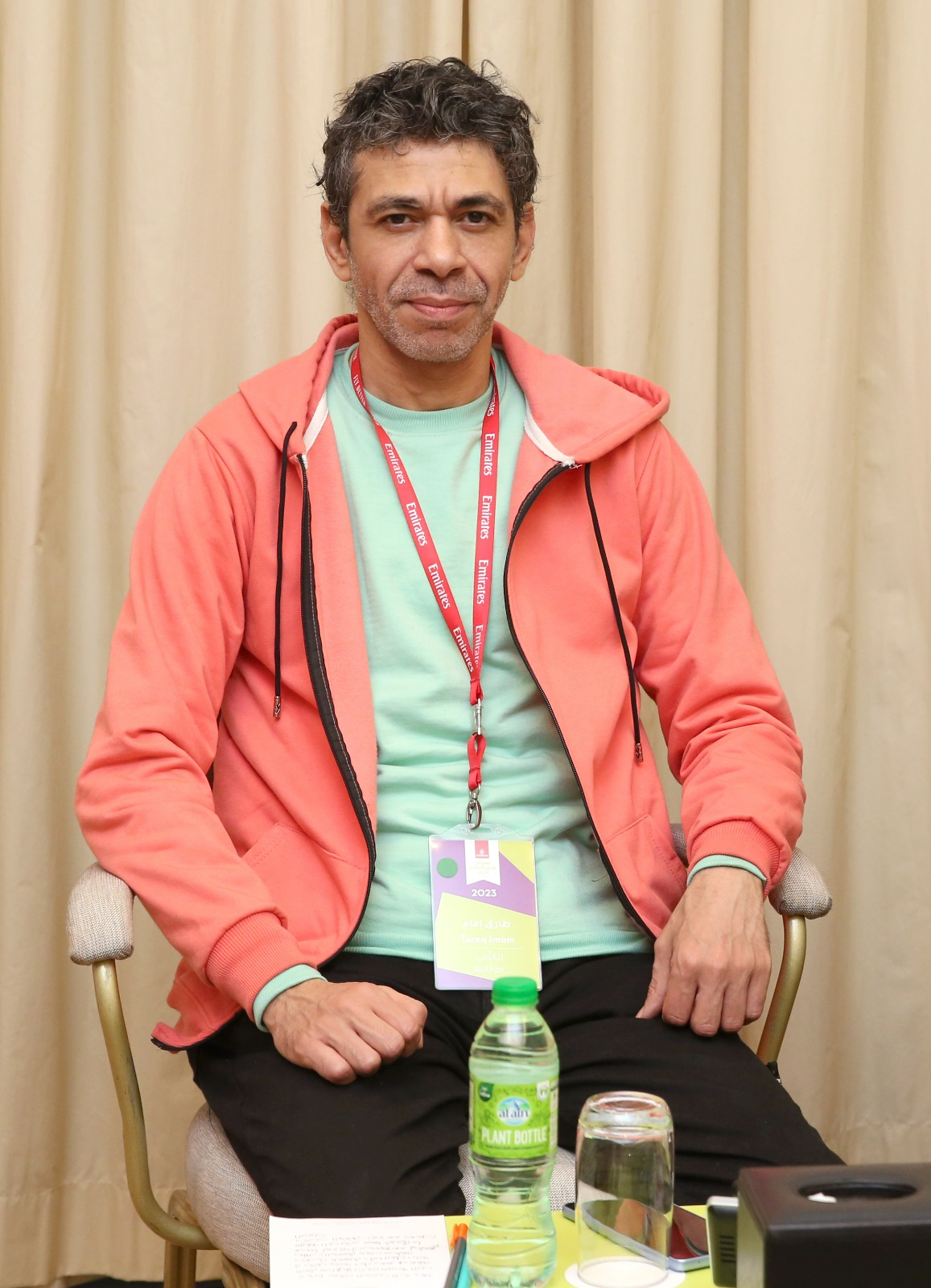

Tarek Emam (born 1977) is an Egyptian writer.

== Early life ==
He studied at the University of Alexandria and works as a radio journalist. He published his first book, a collection of short stories, in 1995 at the age of 18. He has published several more volumes of fiction since then, including both novels and short stories. In 2010, Emam was selected to participate in the second IPAF Nadwa, a writers' workshop held under the aegis of the International Prize for Arabic Fiction.

== Awards ==
- Sawiris Prize, 2008 - Second prize in the Young Writers category for the novel Hedo'a Alkatalah
