= Mansoura Ez-Eldin =

Egyptian novelist and journalist

- منصورة عزّ الدين
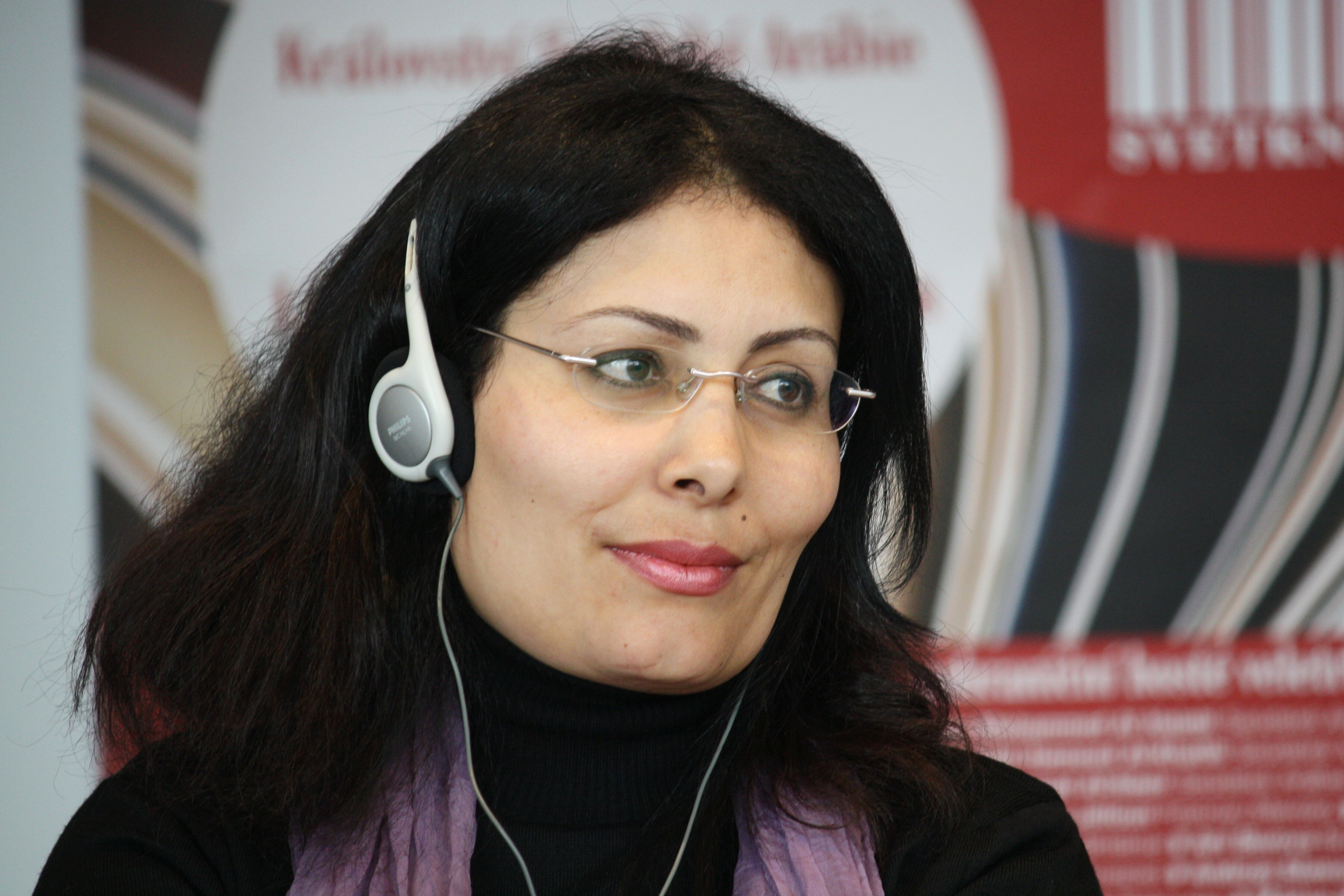
- Born: 1976 (age 49–50); Nile Delta, Egypt
- Education: Studied journalism at Cairo University
- Occupations: Novelist, Journalist
- Writing career
- Language: Arabic
- Years active: 2001–present
- Genres: Fiction, Short Stories
- Notable works: Shaken Light (2001), Mariam's Maze (2004), Beyond Paradise (2009), Towards Madness (2013), Emerald Mountain (2014), Shadow Play (2017), Shelter of Absence (2018), The Orchards of Basra (2020), Disappearance Atlas (2021)
- Notable awards: Cairo International Book Fair Award (2014), Sharjah International Book Fair Award (2014), Shortlisted for Arabic Booker Prize (2010)

Mansoura Ez-Eldin (Arabic: منصورة عزّ الدين; born 1976) is an Egyptian novelist and journalist.

== Biography ==
Mansoura Ez Eldin was born in Delta, Egypt in 1976.

She studied journalism at the Faculty of Media, Cairo University, graduating in 1988, and has since published short stories in various newspapers and magazines. She is currently the deputy editor-in-chief of the cultural weekly Akhbar Al-Adab. Her work has also appeared in international publications such as The New York Times.

She published her first collection of short stories, Shaken Light, in 2001. This was followed by two more short story collections and six novels. Her work has been translated into a number of languages, including an English translation of Maryam's Maze by the American University in Cairo (AUC) Press, which came out in 2007 and German and Italian translations of her work, too.

She won awards at the Cairo International Book Fair in 2014 for Towards Madness and from the Sharjah International Book Fair that same year for Emerald Mountain. Her second novel, Beyond Paradise, was shortlisted for the Arabic Booker Prize in 2010, making her the youngest writer to ever reach the shortlist and the first Egyptian woman writer to do so as well. Her 2020 novel The Orchards of Basra was later longlisted for the same prize.

In 2009, she was selected for the Beirut39 as one of the 39 best Arab authors below the age of 40. She was also a participant in the inaugural Nadwa (writers’ workshop) held by the International Prize for Arabic Fiction in Abu Dhabi.

== Select Bibliography ==
- Shaken Light (short story collection, 2001)
- Mariam's Maze (novel, 2004)
- Beyond Paradise (novel, 2009)
- Towards Madness (short story collection, 2013)
- Emerald Mountain (novel, 2014)
- Shadow Play (novel, 2017)
- Shelter of Absence (short story collection, 2018)
- The Orchards of Basra (novel, 2020)
- Disappearance Atlas (novel, 2021)
