= Kamel Riahi =

Tunisian writer

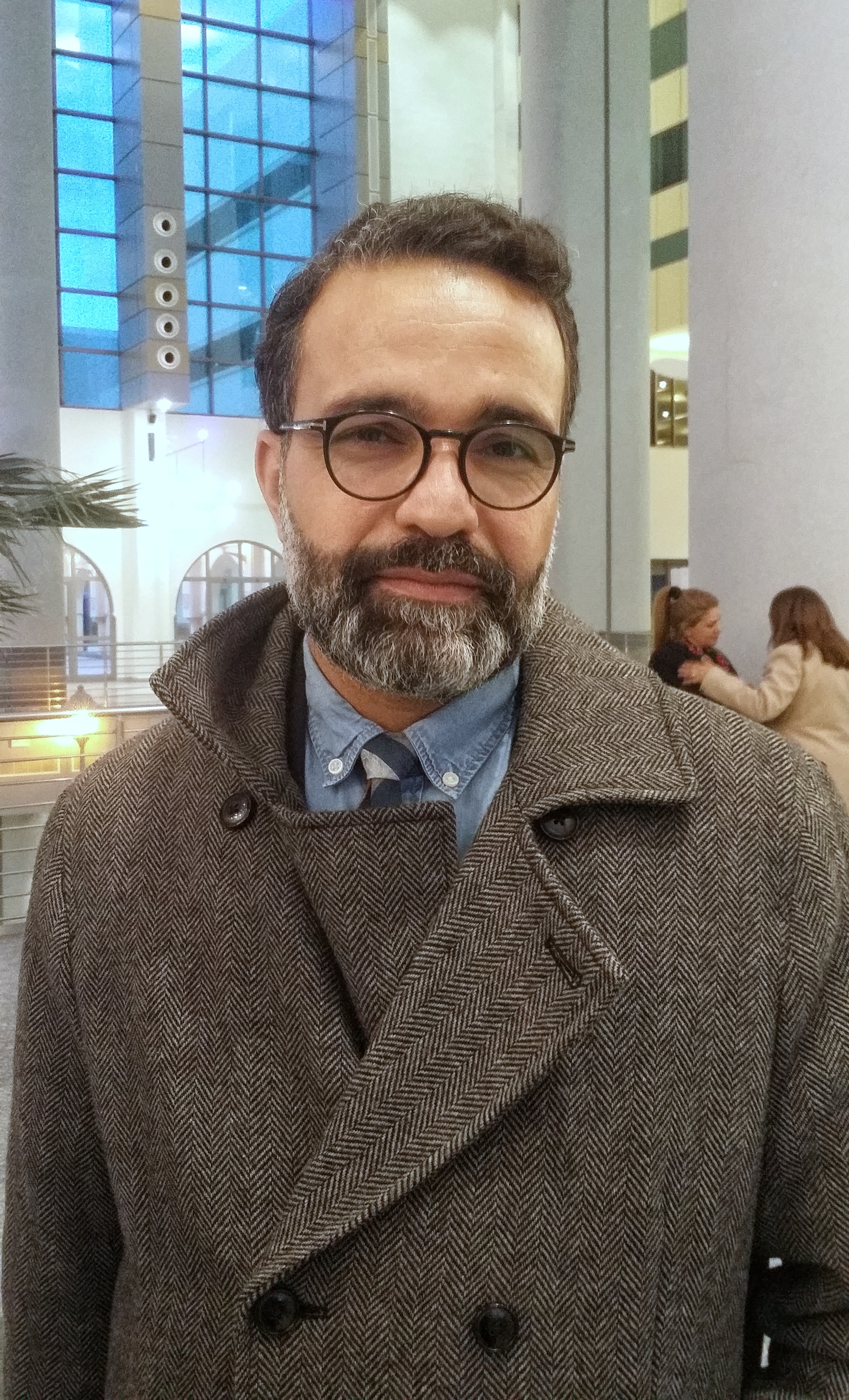
Kamel Riahi

Kamel Riahi or Kamal Riahi (Arabic: كمال الرياحي), born 1974 in Manafikh, Tunisia), is a Tunisian writer. He teaches in Algeria. Excerpts from two of his novels have been translated into English: The Scalpel and Gorilla. Riahi has been translated into English, French, Italian and Hebrew. He was one of the 39 Arab writers under 40 years who were selected for the anthology Beirut39.

In an interview 'White Skin, Black Mask', Kamel Riahi explained: "It might come as a surprise to you to learn that Negro was the term people called my black grandfather. I consider myself as someone of a Negro descent, although I am not black. Perhaps my wide nose proves this theory. Therefore, I am sympathetic towards the blacks ideologically, by heritage and by history. We, the whites, will not be liberated until we liberate ourselves from the racist views we have of other races and religions."

kamal Riahi : Novelist, critic, broadcaster who produces and presents programmes for radio and television.

Initiated and founded Beit al-Riwaya (Centre for the Novel) and behind the Beit al Khayal (House of Fiction) salon and creative-writing lab.

Since the 1990s regular contributor to Arab and international cultural media.

Writes and presents programmes about the novel on Tunisian radio and television: Beit al-Khayal on El Watania 1, and Inhiyaz (Bias) on Radio Tunisie Culture.

Run a large number of workshops in creative, journalistic, and critical writing in Tunisia and the Arab world.

From 2009–2010 headed the translation department at the Arab Higher Institute for Translation in Algeria, and served as director of the Ibn Khaldun Cultural Centre and the Centre for the Novel in the Tunisian City of Culture.

Selected works:

Literature

• Nawaris al-Dhakira (Seagulls of Memory) – short story collection, 1999.

• Suriqa Wajhi (My Face Was Stolen) – short story collection, 2001.

• Al-Mishrat (The Scalpel) – novel, winner of the Comar d’or prize 2006; 2nd edn, Dar al-Junoub, Tunis, 2007; 3rd edn, Dar al-Saqi, Beirut, 2012.

• Al-Ghorila (Gorilla/One Night in Tunis) ¬– novel, Dar al-Saqi 2011.

• ‘Ashiqat al-Nadhl (The Rogue's Lovers) – novel, Dar al-Saqi, 2015.

• Wahid Sifr llqatil (The slain)-journal, al-Mutawassit, 2018.

• al-Beretta Yaksibu Da’iman ( Beretta Always Wins),  al-Mutawassit, 2020. 

Criticism

• Harakat al-Sard al-Riwa’i (The Movement of Fictional Narrative) – Dar Mijdalawi, Jordan, 2005.

• Al-Kitaba al-Riwa’iya ‘ind Wacini Laraj (The Novels of Wacini Laraj) – Karim Sharif Publications, Tunis, 2009.

• Thus Spoke Philippe Lejeune ¬– Interview in the Hakadha Tahaddatha (Thus Spoke) series, 2010.

• Thus Spoke Wacini Laraj¬ – Interview in the Hakadha Tahaddatha (Thus Spoke) series, 2010.

• Nasr Hamed Abu Zeid: Al-Tafkir fi Wajh al-Takfir (Nasr Hamed Abu Zeid: Thinking in the face of takfir) ¬– Karim Sharif Publications, Tunis, 2014.

• Wahid-Sifr lil-Qatil (One-Nil to the Dead Man) – diary, al-Mutawassit Publications, Milan, Italy, 2018.

• Fann al-Riwaya (The Art of the Novel) – Algeria Reads, 2018; 2nd edn, Sotumedias, Tunis, 2019.

Complete works and selections have been translated into French, Italian, English, Portuguese, Swedish, Spanish, Polish, and Persian.

Awards

• Ibn Battuta Prize for Memoir in 2018 for Wahid-Sifr lil-Qatil.

• Academy Prize for best cultural programme on Tunisian television for House of Fiction, 2015

• Hay Festival Prize for the 39 best Arab writers.

• Comar d’or Prize for best Tunisian novel 2007 for Al-Mishrat.

• Only Tunisian writer to be included in the Beirut 39, 2009.

• Selected as one of the five best writers under forty for the IPAF, 2010.

• Short Story Prize, Cairo, Diwan al-Arab, 2005.

== Works ==
- in Samuel Shimon (ed.) (2010): Beirut 39: New Writing From The Arab World. New York: Bloomsbury. ISBN 978-1-4088-0612-8. -- excerpt from al-Mishraṭ (The Scalpel).
- 1999 Nawāris al-dhākira. Tunis:
- 2001 Suriq wajhī. Tunis: Kamāl al-Riyāḥī. ISBN 9973301498
- 2005 Ḥarakat Al-sard Al-riwaʾī Fi Istirātijiyāt Al-tashkīl. Amman: Dar Majdalawi Lil-Nashr Wa-al-Tawzi. ISBN 9789957021955
- 2006 al-Mishraṭ : min sīrat Khadījah wa-aḥzānihā. Tūnis : Dār al-Janūb lil-Nashr
- 2009 al-Kitābah al-riwāʼīyah ʻinda Wāsīnī al-Aʻraj : qirāʼah fī al-tashkīl al-riwāʼī li-Ḥārisat al-ẓilāl . Tūnis : Manshūrāt Kārim al-Sharīf.
- 2009 Ainsi parlait Philippe Lejeune : écriture de soi, autobiographie, journal intime, autofiction, mémoires. Tunis: Travelling.
- 2011 al-Ġūrīlā: riwāya. Bayrūt : Dār al-Sāqī. ISBN 1855168111
- 2015 ʻAshīqāt al-nadhl : riwāyah. Bayrūt : Dār al-Sāqī.
- 2020 Beretta Always Wins), al-Mutawassit, 2020
