= Samer Abu Hawwash =

Palestinian writer and translator (born 1972)

- Born: 1972 (age 53–54); Lebanon
- Title: writer and translator

Samer Abu Hawwash (born 1972) is a Palestinian writer and translator. He was born in Lebanon to a Palestinian refugee family. He has published around ten volumes of poetry, starting with his debut collection Life is Printed in New York (1997). He is also a prolific translator of English-language fiction and non-fiction. Among his notable translations are works by Charles Bukowski, Langston Hughes, Jack Kerouac, Yann Martel, Hanif Kureishi, Denis Johnson and Marilynne Robinson.

He lives in the UAE.
