= Nesma Idris =

Egyptian short story writer (born 1973)

Nesma Idris (born 1973) is an Egyptian short story writer. Born in Jīzah, she is the daughter of famed Egyptian author Yusuf Idris. Her 2003 collection of short stories Malek walla Ketaba (Head or Tail) was runner-up for the Sawiris Prize in the "young writers" category. She has also been involved with the Egyptian feminist group Women and Memory Forum.
