= Hyam Yared =

Lebanese writer (born 1975)

Hiam Yared (born in Beirut in 1975) is a Lebanese writer, who has received numerous awards for her publications.

She is the president of The Lebanese PEN Center.

== Early life and education ==
Hiam was born in 1975 into a middle-class Christian family, and studied sociology at Saint Joseph University in Beirut. She first published a collection of poetry "Moon Reflections" in 2013, winning the gold medal for the Francophone Games in 2004, and published the second collection, "Water Wounds" in 2001. The publication of her collections has led to awards and invitations. Numerous poetry festivals, particularly in Canada, Portugal, Mexico and Sweden. She also participated in many literary evenings in several countries and was the winner of the DUCA6 Stock Exchange awarded by the French Language Academy in 2007. Her work has been characterized by focusing on issues related to freedom, union, traditions, and societal hypocrisy.

== Lebanese Pen Center ==
Yared is the founder and president of the Lebanese PEN Center. Hiam started this position after her discussion with Eugene Shulgin, who expressed a desire to allow literature to be freer in the face of censorship and any form of fear.

== Works ==
- Reflections from the Moon, Beirut 2001.
- Cabinet of Shadows, Paris, 2006.
- Damn it, France 2012.
- Aesthetics of predation, Montreal 2013.
- Everything is a hallucination, Paris "French Literature" 2016.
