= Mohamed Salah El Azab =

Egyptian writer & novelist (born 1981)

- محمد صلاح العزب
- Born: 19 September 1981 (age 44); Cairo, Egypt
- Occupations: writer, novelist

Mohamed Salah El Azab (Arabic: محمد صلاح العزب; born 19 September 1981) is an Egyptian writer and novelist.

== Early life ==
He was born in Cairo. He has published several novels and short story collections, and has won multiple awards for his fiction. He has been described by Al-Ahram newspaper as "one of Egypt's rising literary talents".

== Career ==
His first novel A Long Cellar with a Low Ceiling Making You Crouch was published from Kuwait in 2003. This was followed in 2007 by his second novel Repeated Stopping, published by Dar Merit. His third novel was The Italian's Bed and his fourth Sidi Barrani, the latter published in 2010. He has also published a short story collection called Blue In a Sad Way (2003).

El Azab has won several literary awards, including:

- the Suad Al-Sabah Award for the Novel (Kuwait)
- the Egyptian Higher Council for Culture award for the short story in 1999 and 2004
- the Egyptian Higher Council For Culture award for the novel for 2004

El Azab's work appeared in English translation in Banipal magazine in 2008. He was a participant in the inaugural IPAF Nadwa in 2009. Also in 2009-10, he was selected as one of the Beirut39, a Hay Festival project to highlight the most promising young writers in the Arab world. He participated in the Beirut Hay Festival in April 2010. Jadaliyya magazine published a long interview with El Azab in 2011.

== See also ==
- List of Egyptian authors
- List of Egyptian writers
