= Il Sirente =

Italian book publisher

Coordinates: 42.155084°N 13.345480°E

- Parent company: Independent
- Status: Active
- Founded: 1998
- Country of origin: Italy
- Headquarters location: Fagnano Alto
- Distribution: Worldwide
- Key people: Simone Benvenuti
- Publication types: Books
- Imprints: 58
- No. of employees: 3
- Official website: sirente.it

Editrice il Sirente is an Italian book publisher with specialisms in human rights and international law, Arabic fiction and comics, investigation, actuality.

The company was founded in 1998. The catalog, including works of nonfiction on topics mainly attributable to politics and international law, works of fiction and fantastic intertwined with the theme of marginality as detailed in the manifesto Pensieri dal carcere (Quelques messages personnels) by Pierre Clémenti. In his long catalog provides many Canadian authors such as Hubert Aquin, François Barcelo, Norman Nawrocki, Gaëtan Brulotte and Italian Giovanni Conso, Piero Fassino, Flavia Lattanzi, Umberto Leanza, Antonio Marchesi, Danilo Zolo, and Paolo Benvenuti. Among others, more recently, some Arab writers like Khaled Al Khamissi, Nawal al-Sa‘dawi and Magdy El Shafee of the series Altriarabi, and others like Steve LeVine in the series Inchieste.

== Principal authors published ==
Albania:

- Topi, Eneida

Angola:

- Ondjaki

Brazil:

- Almino, João
- Carvalho, Bernardo

Canada:

- Aquin, Hubert
- Barcelo, François
- Carpentier, André
- Brulotte, Gaëtan
- Nawrocki, Norman
- Schabas, William A.

Egypt:

- Aladdin, Muhammad
- Khamissi, Khaled Al
- El Kamhawi, Ezzat
- Nàgi, Ahmed
- Sa‘dawi, Nawal al-
- Shafee, Magdy El

Netherlands:

- Al Galidi, Rodaan

France:

- Clémenti, Pierre
- Ruiller, Jerome
- Guène, Faïza
- Adimi, Kaouther
- Azzeddine, Saphia

Germany:

- Khider, Abbas

Iraq:

- Blasim, Hassan

Italy:

- Benvenuti, Paolo
- Chiuppani, Beppe
- Conso, Giovanni
- Di Pasquale, Massimiliano
- Fassino, Piero
- Latino, Agostina
- Lattanzi, Flavia
- Leanza, Umberto
- Marchesi, Antonio
- Moccia, Gabriele
- Prikedelik
- Santori, Valeria
- Zeno-Zencovich, Vincenzo
- Zolo, Danilo

Lebanon:

- Zankoul, Maya

Palestine:

- Abu Oksa Daoud, Suheir
- Bakriyyah, Raja'
- Hlehel, Ala
- Musallam, Akram
- Naffa', Hisham
- Shalash, Bashir
- Taha, Muhammad Ali

Syria:

- Dibo, Mohammed
- Haji, Golan
- Sirees, Nihad

United States:

- LeVine, Steve
- Spitzmiller, Rebecca

South Africa:

- Mpe, Phaswane

United Kingdom:

- Dabbagh, Selma
- Sukkar, Sumia

Uganda:

- Daniel Nsereko

== Series ==
=== Diritto (1999) ===
Series devoted to essays on international law.

=== Fuori (2007) ===
Series open, graphically represented as a cyclical book: the front cover is the first page of the novel to give the reader a chance to plunge immediately into the story, until graphic image placed on the back cover, giving the reader a chance to continue reading, again from the beginning. The first issue comes out on November 3, 2007.

N.	Italian title	Original title and year	Author	Nationality	Year in Italy
1	L'Anarchico e il Diavolo fanno cabaret	(The Anarchist and the Devil Do Cabaret), 2002	Norman Nawrocki	Canada	2007
2	Pensieri dal carcere	(Quelques messages personnels), 2001	Pierre Clémenti	France	2007
3	Agénor, Agénor, Agénor e Agénor	(Agénor, Agénor, Agénor et Agénor), 1981	François Barcelo	Canada	2009
4	Doppia esposizione	(L'emprise), 1978	Gaëtan Brulotte	Canada	2008
5	L'amore di Narciso e altri racconti	(L’amore di Narciso e altri racconti, 2010)	Eneida Topi	Albania	2010
6	L'invenzione della morte	(L'invention de la mort), 1991	Hubert Aquin	Canada	2010
7	Prossimo episodio	(Prochain épisode), 1965	Hubert Aquin	Canada	2011
8	Racconti cubisti	(Racconti cubisti), 2011	Prikedelik	Italy	2011
9	Medio Occidente	(Medio Occidente), 2014	Beppi Chiuppani	Italy	2014
10	Golem XIV	(Golem XIV), 1981	Stanisław Lem	Poland	2017
11	Cazzarola! Anarchia, Rom, Amore, Italia	(Cazzarola! Anarchy, Romani, Love, Italy), 2015	Norman Nawrocki	Canada	2018

=== Altriarabi (2008) ===
Series dedicated to the contemporary and unaligned voices of Arab world. The first issue comes out on September 13, 2008.

N.	Italian title	Original title and year	Author	Nationality	Year in Italy
1	Taxi. Le strade del Cairo si raccontano	(Taxi. Hawadit al-mashawir, 2006)	Khaled Al Khamissi	Egypt	2008
2	L'amore ai tempi del petrolio	(Al-Hubb Fi Zaman Al-Naft: Riwayah, 2001)	Nawal al-Sa‘dawi	Egypt	2009
3	Rogers e la Via del Drago divorato dal Sole	(Rogers, 2007)	Ahmed Nàgi	Egypt	2010
4	Metro	(Metro, 2008)	Magdy El Shafee	Egypt	2010
5	La danza dello scorpione	(Sîrat al-'aqrab alladhî yatasabbabu 'araqan, 2008)	Akram Musallam	Palestine	2011
6	Amalgam	(Amalgam, 2009)	Maya Zankoul	Lebanon	2011
7	Amalgam 2	(Amalgam Vol. 2, 2010)	Maya Zankoul	Lebanon	2012
8	Il matto di Piazza della Libertà	(Majnun sahat al-hurriyya, 2009)	Hassan Blasim	Iraq	2012
9	Qui finisce la terra		Suheir Abu Oksa Daoud, Raja' Bakriyyah, Ala Hlehel, Akram Musallam, Hisham Naffa', Bashir Shalash, Muhammad Ali Taha	Palestine	2012
10	L’autunno qui, è magico e immenso		Golan Haji	Syria	2013
11	Il silenzio e il tumulto	(As-Samt wa-s-sakhab, 2004)	Nihad Sirees	Syria	2014
12	La città del piacere	(Madīnat al-ladhdha, 1997)	Ezzat El Kamhawi	Egypt	2015
13	Cani sciolti	(Kalb balady mudarrab, 2014)	Muhammad Aladdin	Egypt	2015
14	E se fossi morto?	(Kaman Yushaid mawtihi, 2012)	Mohammed Dibo	Syria	2015
15	Vita: istruzioni per l'uso	(Istikhdam al-Hayat, 2014)	Ahmed Nàgi	Egypt	2016

=== Altriarabi Migrante (2015) ===
In 2015 born the sub-series Migrante dedicated to the Arabic second and third generation of writers in Europe, selected for EU co-funding. The project's supports cultural and linguistic diversity, promotes the transnational circulation of European literature and intends to achieve the widest possible accessibility. It undertakes the translation of eight works from five countries in the EU (France, Germany, Netherlands, Sweden, and the UK) into Italian.

Series	N.	Italian title	Original title and year	Author	Nationality	Year in Italy
Altriarabi migrante	1	Se ti chiami Mohammed	(Les Mohammed, 2011)	Jérôme Ruiller	France	2015
Altriarabi migrante	2	L'autistico e il piccione viaggiatore	(De autist en de postduif, 2009)	Rodaan Al Galidi	Holland	2016
Altriarabi migrante	3	I miracoli	(Der falsche Inder, 2008)	Abbas Khider	Germany	2016
Altriarabi migrante	4	Il ragazzo di Aleppo che ha dipinto la guerra	(The boy from Aleppo, 2013)	Sumia Sukkar	United Kingdom	2016
Altriarabi migrante	5	La Mecca-Phuket	(La Mecque-Phuket, 2010)	Saphia Azzeddine	France	2016
Altriarabi migrante	6	Un uomo non piange mai	(Un homme, ça ne pleure pas, 2014)	Faïza Guène	France	2017
Altriarabi migrante	7	Le ballerine di Papicha	(L’envers des autres, 2010)	Kaouther Adimi	France	2017
Altriarabi migrante	8	Fuori da Gaza	(Out Of It, 2011)	Selma Dabbagh	United Kingdom	2017

=== Inchieste (2009) ===
Series dedicated to news reports.

N.	Italian title	Original title and year	Author	Nationality	Year in Italy
1	Il petrolio e la gloria. La corsa al dominio e alle ricchezze della regione del Mar Caspio	(The Oil and the Glory: The Pursuit of Empire and Fortune on the Caspian Sea), 2007	Steve LeVine	USA	2009
2	Il labirinto di Putin. Spie, omicidi e il cuore nero della nuova Russia	(Putin's Labyrinth: Spies, Murder, and the Dark Heart of the New Russia), 2008	Steve LeVine	USA	2010
3	Ucraina terra di confine. Viaggio nell'Europa sconosciuta		Massimiliano Di Pasquale	Italy	2012
4	Riga magica. Cronache dal Baltico		Massimiliano Di Pasquale	Italy	2015
5	Fùcino. Acqua, terra, infanzia		Roberto Carvelli	Italy	2018

=== Nuovi percorsi (2011) ===
Series devoted to topical subjects, published under license Creative Commons and available in version eBook on the web.

N.	Italian title	Author	Nationality	Year in Italy
1	Ci vuole poco per fare una università migliore	Vincenzo Zeno-Zencovich	Italy	2011
2	Speranze e paure nel futuro delle rivolte arabe	Gabriele Moccia	Italy	2014
3	Quando studiavamo in America	Beppi Chiuppani	Italy	2016
4	La terza cultura e la mutazione letale	Anna Curir	Italy	2016

=== Comunità alternative (2011) ===
Ten works closed series devoted to post-colonial literature, where are explored forms of interpersonal relationship born of unconventional approaches to sexual identity, ethnicity, cultural and religious diversity, thus offering new ways of conception of social and human relations.

N.	Italian title	Original title and year	Author	Nationality	Year in Italy
1	Benvenuti a Hillbrow	(Welcome to Our Hillbrow, 2001)	Phaswane Mpe	South Africa	2011
2	Le cinque stagioni dell’amore	(As Cinco Estações do Amor, 2001)	João Almino	Brazil	2012
3	NonnaDiciannove e il segreto del sovietico	(AvóDezanove e o Segredo do Soviético, 2008)	Ondjaki	Angola	2014

== Awards and honors ==
- On December 4, 2014, the publishing house received the «Special Award Franco Cuomo International Award» for the «development of new forms of cultural expression, social and human of our time».
- Creative Europe Literally Translation 2015: The Project «Altriarabi Migrante» consists of seven volumes. The selection includes works published between 2003 and 2014 by European Authors of Arab origin (1°-2° generation), born from 1971 to 1992, from France, the United Kingdom, Germany and the Netherlands (countries with the highest percentage of Arab immigrants). The books have a high quality, which has allowed them to win prizes. The works are characterized by an analysis of the sense of belonging and national identity, torn between the land of origin, modernity and Europe and the discomfort this conflict brings. Strong themes of cultural hybridization emerge: in some works it arises from a language mixed with Arabic words and hybrid structures between new and original language. There is a constant reformulation of power relations between real and symbolic centres and fringes.
- Librinfestival 2016 as «Best Publisher»: E se fossi morto? (Kaman Yushaid mawtihi, 2012) by Mohammed Dibo, 2015.
- Librinfestival 2017 as «Best Book»: Il ragazzo di Aleppo che ha dipinto la guerra (The boy from Aleppo, 2013) by Sumia Sukkar, 2016.

== Notes ==
This article was based substantially on its counterpart in the Italian Wikipedia, il Sirente.
