= A Well-Trained Stray =

2014 novel by Muhammad Aladdin

A Well-trained Stray
- First edition
- Author: Muhammad Aladdin
- Original title: كلب بلدي مدرب
- Language: Arabic
- Genre: Novel
- Published: 2014
- Publisher: Elain Publishing House
- Publication place: Egypt
- Media type: Print (paperback)
- Pages: 125 pp (first Ar. edition, paperback)
- ISBN: 978-977-490-267-3 (first Ar. edition, paperback)
- Preceded by: Young Lover, New Lover

A Well-Trained Stray (Arabic: كلب بلدي مدرب ʿKālb Bālādy Mudārab) is a novel by Muhammad Aladdin, an Egyptian author.

The book was publishedin Arabic in 2014. The book, set in 2013 after the 2013 Egyptian coup d'état, is a Picaresque novel. The book is a scathing, minimalistic portrayal of the modern generation in Egyptian society during the 1990s. The novel is set in several unnamed lower and middle class areas in Cairo. The novel also reflects on the porn industry and its impact on modern Egyptian society, referencing porn stars such as Jenna Jameson and Sunny Leone among others.

A Well-Trained Stray had a warm reception upon its publication critically or commercially. "A fresh sophisticated structure" as Akhbar Al-Adab called it, and it is "a renovation on the linguistic, theoretical, and artistic levels" as the notable Egyptian critic Amani Fouad described it. Hasan Marouf, described it being, "monitoring with witty and ironic drive a whole generation." It is also "a witty novel on critique the state and the intelligentsia" as the notable Egyptian Tahrir newspaper called it, another review stating it "generates confusion in the reader's mind, without being direct or loud," as described by the critique of the prolific Lebanese Newspaper An Nahar. On May 14, 2014. The novel was translated and published in Italian in 2016, by Il Sirente, it was presented in Turin international book fair, after a wide warm reception by major Italian publications. Il fatto quotidiano, Il Manifesto, L'Esspresso, among many others, ran critiques of the novel or interviews with the author.

== Plot summary ==
The novel begins with a comedic scene where Ahmad, the main character and the book's narrator, is with his friend Nevine in her car by Cairo-Alexandria desert road. They are nearly caught by the police, but Nevine narrowly manages to escape.

Ahmad writes pornographic stories for a living, using odesk.com. Through it, he found an agent who was interested in Arabic porn stories. After sending a sample, he completed a simple interview and began to work. We know that he's living alone with his aunt after the death of his grandmother and that his father has remarried after the death of his mother. We get to know two of his best friends - El Loul, a failed TV director who is now trying to promote his scriptwriting as well as managing C-rated belly-dancers for cheap satellite channels – Abdullah, a drug addict, and his childhood best friend, who came from a wealthier family and an apathetic of attitude. Through tracking the two characters and their connection to Ahmad we can glimpse the 1990s middle-class generation in Cairo as well as the strange relationship Ahmad and Abdullah had when they were teenagers, and, echoing that, the porn industry and its stars.

Nevine herself is such a character: She's a perfect nymphomaniac who married a guy she despises after returning with her family from the Persian Gulf region, where she spent her childhood. While the husband, who married her for her family's money, is off in the Gulf, she has her revenge by having sex with as many men as she can, only two or three times before hitting on a new man. Through this, she got to know Ahmad and she dumped him as usual before getting to know Ali Luza.

Ali Luza, a "Robin Hood targeting the Sluts", as Ahmad describes him in one point in the novel, escorts them for a while and pays for them, but after his boredom with the liaison, he just mugs them, getting his money back with extra. Ali is a son of a working-class "shaabi" restaurant owner but never lacks for self-esteem. He has a brother, Hamousa, a drug addict, and he's serving as a local thug. Nevine got mugged by Luza as expected, and from what she said very briefly to Ahmad, she was also gang-raped before he took all of her money, credit cards, with codes, and made her sign a contract selling her expensive car. As Ahmad realizes, the contract will only be used to get more money out of her to get the car back.

Nevine wants to beat Ali up for what he did, and she seeks Ahmad's help. He takes her to see El Loul in one of his favorite night-clubs, and while Tslam Al Ayadi is playing with a C-rated belly-dancer, Ahmad was telling El Loul his idea: He will keep Nevine in his place while sending a belly dancer El Loul knows to seduce Ali, who will go to El Loul's place. There, they would kidnap him till getting Nevine's stuff back. Abdullah agreed to join the scheme for the good money Nevine offered, and so did El Loul.

Indeed, they sent a belly dancer to Ali Louza's father restaurant, which was where he first picked up Nevine and where he used to stay. There, Ali fights with locals and gains the belly dancer's admiration, which makes the plan fall through when Ali falls for her friend. It's a fiasco and facing this truth Ahmad improvises an even crazier scheme: Him and Abdullah, will wait in the spot Ali Louza will come to pick up the money and give back the car, in some alley near downtown. There, they'll attack him, put him in the car, and drive to one of Abdullah's friends homes in Al Rehab (a city in between Cairo and Suez).

Eventually, they went there, wearing two pairs of women's stockings over their heads so as not to be discovered (such a lousy old-fashioned way to masquerade, in tribute to old Egyptian action movies especially Adel Emam's "Al Mashbooh"), and they attacked Ali and Hamousa, who was taken aback. But suddenly another thing happened: The local gang Ali Louza had previously fought ambushed him at the same time, bullets were whizzing around, and Ahmad found himself in front of the bag of money Nevine brought for Ali. He just picked it up without thinking, leaving both Abdullah (who had probably been hit by then) and Nevine, who had fled with the car after the windows had been shot out.

Ahmad ran to a wide street, discovering that he had failed to remove the stocking from his head, and faced a patrol and many people looking at him in shock. He continued to run, both police and people chased him.

== Literary significance and criticism ==
In his article about the novel, Egyptian poet Rami Yehia compared the lead paragraph of the First-person narrative novel with the great opening of Kafka's The Metamorphosis, where both of them, in his opinion, did a great introduction for the world of their novels. Along with Yehia, the two critiques Amani Fouad and Hasan Maarouf wrote in there pieces about how the characters convey that feeling of lost and mechanical way of living, reviewing the condition of those characters and their own lanes in life. It was highly notable that a certain line Aladdin wrote reflected how his protagonist review Egypt and its current condition:

"Nobody has interfered with that fight, which seemed to me like everything in this city: A pseudo-something."

On January 30, Aladdin spoke with Macia Lynx Qualey of Arabic Literature in English blog, stating that " I have built on our lives in the 1990s, and our nightmares in 2013". then he goes more to speak about the novel when asked about its variation of his previous works like The Gospel According to Adam " I guess A Well-trained Stray has more of a 'realistic' kick, the way it can be somehow a part of dirty realism. It has simpler language and more obvious humour. It is like "The Season of Migration to Arkidea" (my latest long story), I guess both the story and the novel marking a new drive for me, putting in mind that I guess I use the right language level on each piece. For me, you can't write A Well-trained Stray with The Gospel According to Adam language level, and vice versa". It is the first time ever Aladdin uses slang-even in dialogue- in his books.
