= Muhammad Aladdin =

Egyptian writer

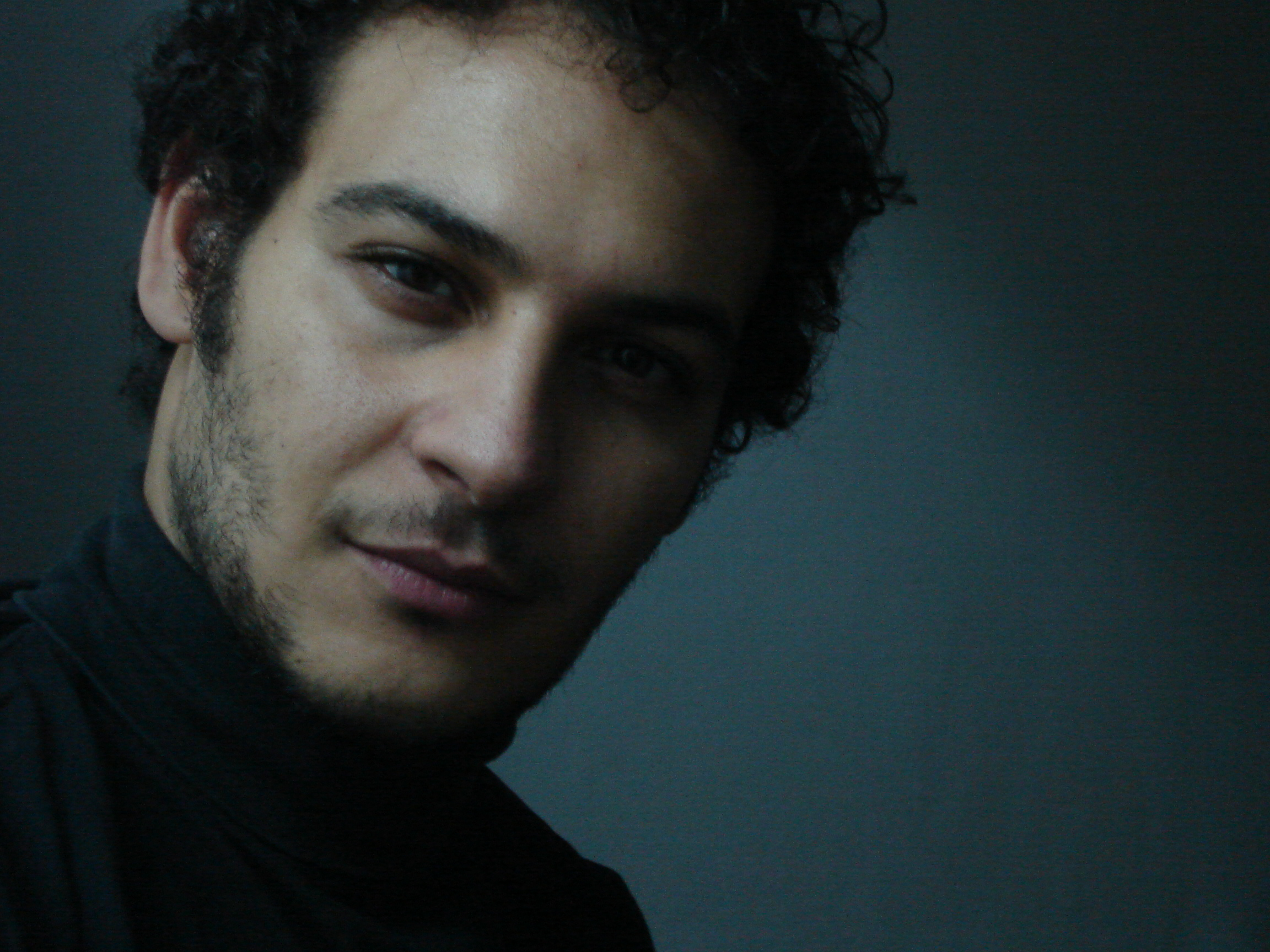
- Born: October 7, 1979 (age 46); Bab El Louk, Cairo, Egypt
- Occupations: novelist, freelance script writer
- Writing career
- Literary movement: Postmodern

Muhammad Aladdin, also known as Alaa Eddin (Arabic:محمـد علاء الديـن) is an Egyptian novelist, short story writer, and script writer. His first collection of short stories was published in 2003, and he is the author of five novels—The Gospel According to Adam, The Twenty-Second Day, The Idol (novel), The Foot (novel), and A Well-Trained Stray—and four short story collections—The Other Shore (Short-stories collection), The Secret Life of Citizen M, Young Lover, New Lover, and The Season of Migration to Arkidea.

A 2017's Sawiris Cultural Award winner; Aladdin has emerged as one of the idiosyncratic talents of the 2000s and of the noted writers in both Egypt and the Arab countries, and has been described as "an innovator in the Arabic literature. Aladdin has gained acclamation for his first novel published ‘’The Gospel According to Adam’’ (Arabic:’’’إنجيل آدم’’’) in January 2006. The work has been hailed by writers like Bahaa Taher and Sonallah Ibrahim to be among the best of a promising new crop. That novel breaks the conventional format of the novel, consisting as it does of a single 60-page-long paragraph that is written in a stream of consciousness style. A reviewer for Al-Ahram’s literary page on May 10, 2006, stated that ‘’The Gospel According to Adam’' reflects “a social reality that has lost all certainties". In his book, "The Arab Novel and the Quest for Renovation" published by Dubi Althaqafia Magazine in May 2011, the Moroccan writer and critic Mohammed Berrada named it as one of five novels that have renovated the Arab novel. The Egyptian writer Ibrahim Farghali wrote about it in the Lebanese newspaper An-Nahar that The Gospel According to Adam is "An experimental and substantial leap in narration style in the modern Egyptian novels", while his latest A Well-Trained Stray, published in 2014, has been described in both Egyptian and Italian critique as "a mirror for a whole generation", sometimes compared to The Great Gatsby. The novel was the only book in Arabic presented at the Turin International Book Fair in May 2016, and the author was named along with renowned writers of Arabic literature like Adunis, Yasmina Khadra, and Tahar Ben Jelloun.

Aladdin was chosen as one of the most important Egyptian writers in the new millennium by the Egyptian magazine Akhbar Al-Adab in 2011, and one of the ‘’Six Egyptian writers you don’t know but you should’’ as the writer Pauls Toutonghi said in The millions.com.

In May 2013, Aladdin gave a keynote speech in the name of the young Egyptian writers, in the First Convention for Egyptian Writers against the Muslim Brotherhood regime ruling Egypt back then, who were claiming to dissolve Egypt’s Ministry of Culture in order to establish a new republic. However, Aladdin spoke openly against the new regime in Egypt after 2013 Egyptian coup d'état and refused to participate in the Second conviction saying to ArabLit magazine, on October 23, 2013, that ‘’They would use us as make-up for the same ugly face’’. As a consequence, he was banned from article writing in Egypt.

Aladdin wrote for MTV’s Rebel Music about Ramy Essam as ‘’The Revolution Singer’’ in November 2013.

== Writings ==
- Aladdin's literary career began in 2000, when he co-wrote the comic, youth-oriented series Maganin (Mad People), published by Al Mobdeoun publishing house. The series have stopped in 2002 after 10 issues, some of which reached 20,000 copies in Egypt and the Arab world. In 2001 he started writing on cinema and light-content essays for 5 issues of another series called Ice Cream from the same publishing house and in 2002 he wrote another series called Comicia for Dar Al Hussam; this lasted for 4 issues.
- In 2002, he was one of two writers to participate in an internationally funded workshop on comic-book creation. The result was the tri-lingual Arabic, English, and French. comic album The Adventures of Prince Seif Ibn Zi Yazan (Cairo, Ahamd El Attar, nd 2004).
- In 2003, he published his first conventionally literary book, Al Daffa Al Ukhra (The Other Shore), a volume of short stories published by The General Organization for Cultural Palaces, an organ of Egypt's ministry of culture. the book was well received by readers and other writers alike.
- In 2004, Aladdin won The General Organization for Cultural Palaces' prize (3rd rank) in its pan-Egyptian central contest, for his unpublished first novel Al Dawa’ir (The Circles). In the same year excerpts from his second novel (was unpublished back then) The Twenty-Second Day (Arabic: اليوم الثاني و العشرون) appeared in the prestigious literary magazine Akhbar al-Adab, then to be published in the Egyptian El-'Ain Publishing House in 2007.
- In 2008, he had 2 new books published, The Idol (novel) (Arabic: الصنم), a novel from El-'Ain publishing, and The Secret Life of Citizen M (Arabic: الحياة السرية للمواطن م), a short-stories collection, from Mezan publishing house. He also had the second printing of The Gospel According to Adam released by Mezan.
- In 2005, he began writing comics for the Saudi children's magazine Basem.
- In October 2009, his story New Lover, Young Lover was published in the American A Public Space in its Cairo portfolio, it was translated by Humphrey T. Davies (The Yacoubian Building, Gate of the Sun (Novel)), and was first published in Arabic in November 2009 by the Egyptian Supreme Council for Culture in a special anthology titled "The Best Egyptian Short Stories.
- In 2009, he published his fourth novel The Foot (novel) (Arabic: القدم) from El-'Ain Publishing house.
- In 2012, he published his short-stories collection Young Lover, New Lover (Arabic: الصغير والحالي) from Merit Publishing house, soon it was chosen as one of the most important books of the year by Al Saqia Al Thaqafia The Cultural Wheel, a notable arts and literature centre in Egypt, it was the only short story collection chosen.

Along with the American translation of the main title story, a Russian translation for one of the stories within it, The Voice (short story), was published by the Russian newspaper Moskovskij Komsomolets in their Egypt edition, translated by Sarali Gintsburg. In March 2014, the same story was translated to Italian by Barbra Benini and published in Editoriaraba, a notable Italian blog dedicated to Arabic Literature, in 24 hours it was reblogged on the blog MedShake on the ISPI website, an Italian prestigious research institute on international politics.

- In January 2014, Aladdin has his fifth novel published, A Well-Trained Stray by Al ‘Ain Publishing. It was released in Italian in September 2015 by the Italian publishing house Il Seriente, under the name Cani Sicolti.
- In January 2014, Aladdin has his fourth short stories collection, as three long story volume The Season of Migration to Arkidea by Merit publishing, The title story was translated into Dutch and Italian before actually published in book in Arabic.

== Other works ==
- He participated in The Arab Short stories Conference, and The Arab Novel Conference, both held 2008 and 2009 respectively, and organized by The Supreme Council for Culture-Egypt.
- In 2010 he gave a lecture about his works in the Edinburgh University's Middle Eastern Society.
- He participated in the Dutch famous festival Writers' Unlimited in 2015.
- Aladdin has held a creative writing workshop for children of Alexandria upon the request of Bibliotheca Alexandrina in 2004.
- Lectured on creative writing in International Labour Organization's (ILO) International Programme on the Elimination of Child Labour (IPEC) Scream program . in Cairo, 2005.
