= Stephen Levine =

Stephen Levine may refer to:

- Stephen B. Levine (born 1942), American psychiatrist and author, known for his work in human sexuality
- Stephen Levine (author) (1937–2016), American poet, author and spiritual teacher best known for his work on death and dying
- Steve Levine, British record producer
- Steve LeVine, American journalist in the area of energy security and geopolitics
