= Neliana Tersigni =

Italian journalist (1945–2026)

- Born: 13 April 1945; Rome, Italy
- Died: 14 July 2026 (aged 81); Rome, Italy
- Occupation: Journalist
- Employer: RAI

Neliana Tersigni (13 April 1945 – 14 July 2026) was an Italian journalist.

== Life and career ==
Tersigni graduated in Russian literature and began her career as a journalist in her early twenties at the daily newspaper Paese Sera, within the Foreign Office, where she was taught by teachers such as Giorgio Signorini and Augusto Livi. She spent three years working for Paese Sera in post-Francisco Franco Spain. In Spain, she wrote from 1976 until 1985, and also wrote for El País.

In 1987, she joined RAI in the editorial staff of TG3, mainly as a war correspondent. From 1987 to 1996, she was in the Middle East. In Beirut, Lebanon, she reported on the last phase of the Israeli-Palestinian war, between 1987 and 1990, but was primarily based in Jerusalem. She covered 1987 and 1993, the first Palestinian intifada, the return of Yasser Arafat, between 1993 and 1996, and the assassination of Yitzhak Rabin on 4 November 1995. Still in the Middle East, between 1990 and 1991, she commented on the first Gulf War, the situation in Saudi Arabia and Baghdad in Iraq, up to the Iraqi missiles on Tel Aviv in 1992.

In 1998 she was appointed correspondent in Russia from Moscow, while in 1999 she moved to Germany, specifically to Berlin. From 2003 to 2010, she was head of the correspondent office in Egypt from Cairo, where she covered the journalistic services of all of North Africa and part of the Arab countries of the Middle East. In 2006, the year in which she was in Lebanon, in a war zone, she won the 5th edition of the "Antonio Russo" National Journalism Award for her war reporting.

After November 2010, she collaborated with Sky TG24. After 2012, she was a correspondent in Libya from Benghazi. She collaborated with the monthly magazine, Lo Straniero, founded by Goffredo Fofi.

Tersigni died on 14 July 2026, at the age of 81.

== Awards and recognitions ==
- In 1996 she received the Alghero Donna Award for the journalism section.

== See also ==
- Khaled Al Khamissi
