= Jonathan Wright (translator) =

British journalist and literary translator

Jonathan Wright (born December 14th, 1953) is a British journalist and literary translator.

== Early life and education ==
Wright was born in 1953 in Andover, Hampshire, and spent his childhood in Canada, Malaysia, Hong Kong, and Germany. He attended Packwood Haugh School from 1966 to 1967 and Shrewsbury School from 1967 to 1971. He studied Arabic, Turkish, and Islamic civilisation at St John's College, Oxford.

== Career ==
Wright joined Reuters news agency in 1980 as a correspondent, and has been based in the Middle East for most of the last three decades. He has served as Reuters' Cairo bureau chief, and has lived and worked throughout the region, including in Egypt, Sudan, Lebanon, Tunisia and the Arabian Gulf region. From 1997 to 2003, he was based in Washington, DC, covering US foreign policy for Reuters. For two years until the autumn of 2011 Wright was editor of the Arab Media & Society Journal, published by the Kamal Adham Center for Journalism Training and Research at the American University in Cairo.

== Translations ==
Year	Title	Author	Original Title	Notes
2008	Taxi	Khaled al-Khamissi	taksi ḥawadīt ʾil-mašawīr	His first major work, published by Aflame Books in 2008 republished by Bloomsbury Qatar in 2012
2009	The Madman of Freedom Square	Hassan Blasim	majnūn sāḥat ʾal-ḥurriyya	A collection of short stories longlisted for the Independent Foreign Fiction Prize in 2010
2011	On the State of Egypt: What Caused the Revolution	Alaa Al-Aswany		A collection of political essays
2012	Judgment Day	Rasha al Ameer	yawm ʾad-dīn	
2012	Life on Hold	Fahd al-Ateeq	kāʾin muʾajjal	
2012	Azazeel	Youssef Ziedan	ʿazāzīl	Won the Arabic Booker prize in 2009. Won the 2013 Banipal Prize for Arabic Literary Translation
2013	The Iraqi Christ	Hassan Blasim	ʾal-masīḥ ʾal-ʿirāqī	Won the Independent Foreign Fiction Prize in 2014
2013	Whatever Happened to the Egyptian Revolution?	Galal Amin	māḏā ḥadaṯa laṯ-ṯawra ʾal-miṣriyya?	
2014	Land of No Rain	Amjad Nasser	ḥaiṯu lā tasquṭ ʾal-ʾamṭār	Commended (runner-up) by the judges of the 2015 Banipal Prize for Arabic Literary Translation
2014	Temple Bar	Bahaa Abdelmegid	khammārat al-maʿbad	
2015	The Bamboo Stalk	Saud Alsanousi	sāq al-bāmbū	Won the Arabic Booker prize in 2013 Won the 2016 Banipal Prize for Arabic Literary Translation
2015	Sleepwalkers	Sa'd Makkawi	ʾas-sāʾirūn niyāman	Awaiting publication
2016	The Televangelist	Ibrahim Eissa	mawlānā	
2016	The Longing of the Dervish	Hammour Ziada	shawq al-darwīsh	Winner of the Naguib Mahfouz Prize
2018	Critique of Religious Discourse	Nasr Hamid Abu Zayd	naqd al-khitāb al-dīnī	
2018	Frankenstein in Baghdad	Ahmed Saadawi	Frankishtayn fī Baghdād	Shortlisted for the Man Booker International Prize Won the Arabic Booker prize in 2014
2019	Jokes for the Gunmen	Mazen Maarouf	Nukāt lil-Musallahīn	Winner of the Multaqa Prize for Arabic Short Stories Longlisted for the Man Booker International Prize
2019	The Book of Collateral Damage	Sinan Antoon	Fihris	Won second prize in the Sheikh Hamad Award for Translation and International Understanding in 2020
2020	The Egyptian Assassin	Ezzedine Choukri Fishere	Abu ʿUmar al-Misrī	
2020	God 99	Hassan Blasim	Allāh 99	Nominated for the Banipal Prize for Arabic Literary Translation in 2021
2021	Here Is A Body	Basma Abdel Aziz	Huna Badan	
2023	The Disappearance of Mr. Nobody	Ahmed Taibaoui	Ikhifā' al-Sayyid La Ahad	Winner of the Naguib Mahfouz Prize
2025	Sololand	Hassan Blasim	Qānūn Sūlūlānd	Includes Bulbul al-Sayyid, a novella written in Iraqi colloquial

== Kidnapping and escape ==
On 29 August 1984, while on a reporting assignment for Reuters in the Bekaa Valley, Lebanon, Wright was detained and held hostage by the Palestinian splinter group led by Abu Nidal in a part of the Lebanon hostage crisis. The group wanted to exchange him for members imprisoned in Britain for shooting the Israeli ambassador, Shlomo Argov, in London in June 1982. Wright spent about one week in a small room in a country house near the town of Barr Elias and was then moved to a large villa near the Chouf mountain town of Bhamdoun, above Beirut. In the early hours of 16 September 1984, Wright escaped from captivity by removing the plank of wood covering a ventilation hole and crawling through the hole, which was about 10 feet above floor level. He reached the hole by dismantling his metal bedstead and using the frame as a ladder. Once outside, he walked along the Beirut-Damascus highway until he reached a checkpoint manned by the mainly Druze Muslim Progressive Socialist Party. The party militia held him incommunicado at Aley police station until 19 September, when party leader Walid Jumblatt told his aides to drive him to the Reuters office in Beirut. Wright has written a detailed account of his kidnapping.

== See also ==
- List of kidnappings
- Lists of solved missing person cases

== Awards and honours ==
- 2013 Banipal Prize for Arabic Literary Translation for the translation of Azazeel by Youssef Ziedan
- 2014 Independent Foreign Fiction Prize for the translation of The Iraqi Christ by Hassan Blassim
- 2016 Banipal Prize for Arabic Literary Translation for his translation of The Bamboo Stalk by Saud Alsanousi
