= Taxi (book) =

Collection of short stories by Khaled Al Khamissi

Taxi. Cabbie Talk
- First edition (Arabic)
- Author: Khaled Al Khamissi
- Original title: Taxi. Hawadith al-mashawir
- Translator: Jonathan Wright
- Language: English
- Publisher: Aflame Book, London
- Publication date: 2006
- Publication place: Egypt
- Media type: Print (paperback)
- Pages: 184 pages
- ISBN: 978-1-906300-02-9

Taxi is a collection of 58 short stories by Khaled Al Khamissi, first published in December 2006.

The book is dedicated "to the life that lives in the words of poor people." Taxi is about urban sociology in the Egyptian capital through the voices of taxi drivers. The author recounts the stories of different taxi drivers he encounters and offers some insight into contemporary Cairo and Egypt.

== Writing ==
Taxi is written mainly in dialect. A tradition of writings in dialect has always existed in the Arab world, but colloquial Arabic has never achieved real literary approbation. However, in recent years a new generation of young Arab authors has begun an innovative literary movement known as al-Riwaya al-Gadida (The New Novel), linked to the phenomenon of bloggers. Taxi is an important literary achievement because it has become a bestseller. Taxi was reprinted 7 times in one year and it sold more than 75,000 copies in a country, Egypt, where 3,000 books sold is considered a success.

Taxi has been translated into English by Jonathan Wright and was published by Aflame Books in 2008.

== Editions ==
- al-Khamissi, Khaled (2006). Taxi. Hawadit al-mashawir. Dar El Shorouk, Cairo. pp. 224, cap. 58. ISBN 978-977-09-1683-4.
- al-Khamissi, Khaled (2008). Taxi. Cabbie talk. Aflame Books, London. pp. 220, cap. 58. ISBN 978-1-906300-02-9.
- al-Khamissi, Khaled (2008). Taxi. Le strade del Cairo si raccontano. collana Altriarabi. il Sirente, Fagnano Alto. pp. 216, cap. 58. ISBN 978-88-87847-14-7.
