= Out of It =

Out of It may refer to:

- Out of It (1969 film), an American comedy film directed by Paul Williams
- Out of It (1977 film), an Australian film
- Out of It (book), a 2011 novel by British-Palestinian author Selma Dabbagh
- "Out of It", 2010 song by Fallulah from The Black Cat Neighborhood
- "Out of It", 2017 song by The Story So Far from Proper Dose
