= Saphia Azzeddine =

French actor, journalist and writer

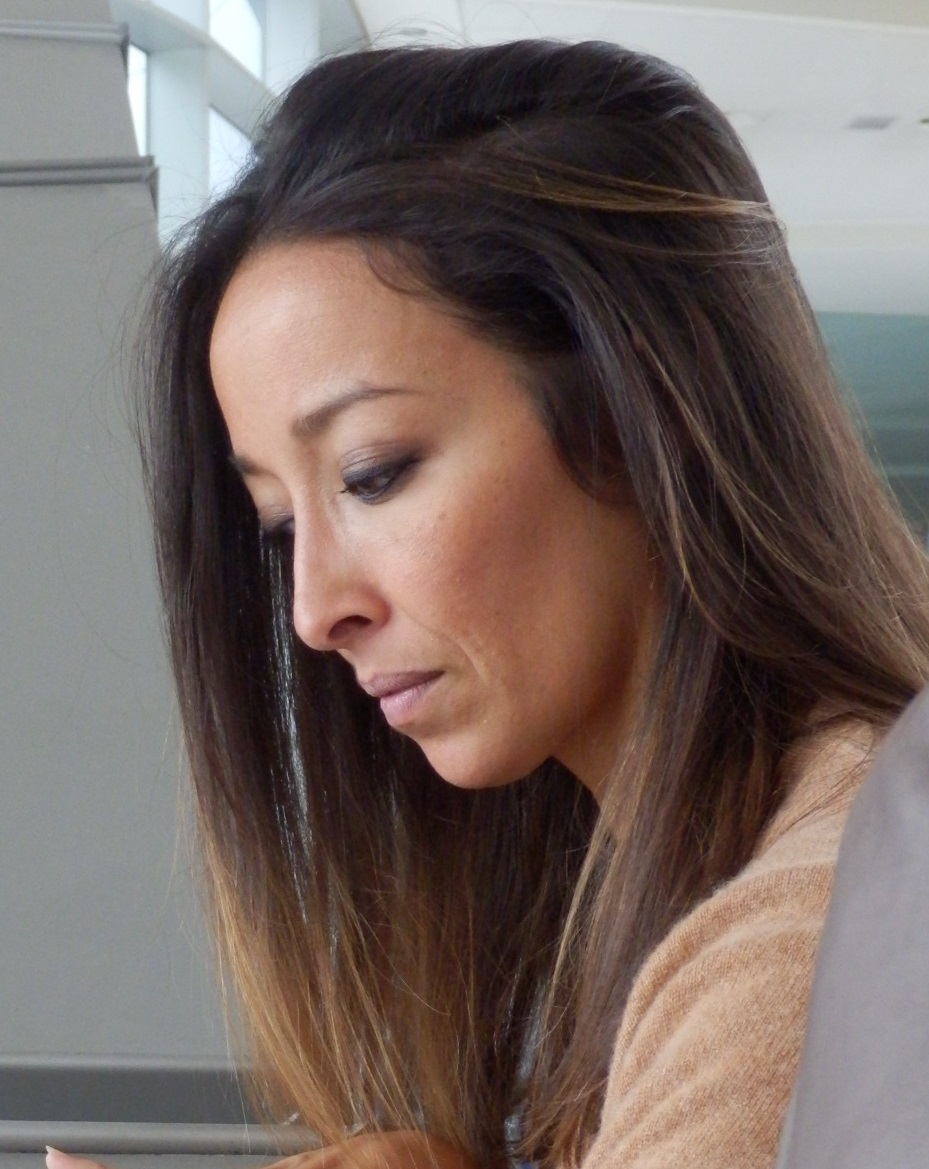
- Born: 12 December 1979 (age 46); Morocco
- Citizenship: France
- Occupations: Writer, actress, and screenwriter

Saphia Azzeddine (born 12 December 1979) is a French naturalized Moroccan writer, actress, and screenwriter.

== Biography ==
Saphia Azzeddine lived in Agadir during her early days of life. At the age of nine, she went to live in France in the city of Ferney-Voltaire, on the border of Switzerland. She continued her studies, earning a classical bachelor's degree and a degree in sociology. Before moving on to writing, she worked as a journalist and screenwriter. In 2002, she interviewed the comedian Jamel Debbouze during his tour in Switzerland for a Geneva magazine. In 2005 she published her first, successful novel, Confidences à Allah, adapted a decade later by Simon Eddy and Marie Avril. In 2011, the film Mon père est femme de ménage was released, of which she is the writer and director. The film was an adaptation of her second novel which was published in 2009.

== Works ==
=== Writing style ===
- Confidences à Allah Léo Scheer Paris
- Mon père est femme de ménage Léo Scheer Paris
- La Mecque-Phuket Léo Scheer Paris
- Héros anonymes Léo Scheer Paris
- Combien veux-tu m'épouser? Paris
- Bilqiss Paris

== Related items ==
- Selma Dabbagh
- Abbas Khider
- Faïza Guène
- Kaouther Adimi
- Rodaan Al Galidi
