= Norman Nawrocki =

- Norman Nawrocki at Chaotic Insurrection Congress

Background information
- Origin: Vancouver, British Columbia
- Genres: Cabaret, punk rock, post rock, spoken word, Klezmer
- Occupations: Comedian, sex educator, cabaret artist, musician, songwriter, author, actor, producer and composer
- Instruments: Violin, vocals, viola, cello, tsymbaly, piano, accordion, concertina, percussion
- Years active: 1985 – present
- Label: Les Pages Noires
- Website: Les Pages Noires

Norman Nawrocki (born in Vancouver, British Columbia), is a Montreal-based comedian, sex educator, cabaret artist, musician, author, actor, producer and composer. Nawrocki together with Sylvain Côté were the founding members of "rock 'n roll cabaret" band Rhythm Activism. Nawrocki owns Les Pages Noires, through which he has published twenty albums and three books.

== Early life and education ==
Nawrocki was born in the East End of Vancouver to Polish/Ukrainian Canadian parents.

== Career ==
In 2001, Nawrocki and Godspeed You! Black Emperor drummer Aidan Girt formed a duo called Bakunin's Bum, named after the anarchist philosopher Mikhail Bakunin. Their recording, Fight to Win! was released in 2001 on G7 Welcoming Committee Records as a benefit for the Ontario Coalition Against Poverty and featured spoken word by anti-poverty activists over instrumental music.

By the end of 2005 Nawrocki was teaching a course at Concordia University's School of Community & Public Affairs on The Arts, Radical Social Change and Community Economic Development. As well as starring in Uncle Eddie's guide to art appreciation, by Donald Goodes.

On 25 February 2010, Norman Nawrocki has signed, together with 500 artists, the call to support the international campaign for Boycott, Divestment and Sanctions against Israeli apartheid.

== Bibliography ==
- Rhythm Activism live (1987) (Les Pages Noires)
- Resist much – obey little (1987) (Les Pages Noires)
- Rebel moon : anarchist rants & poems (1997) ISBN 1-873176-08-2 (AK Press)
- Chasseur de tornades (1998) ISBN 2-9803993-7-X; ISBN 2-9805763-0-1 (EDAM Montréal; Les Pages Noires)
- No masters! No Gods! : dare to dream (1999) ISBN 0-9697112-2-0 (Smarten Up! & get to the point)
- The anarchist & the devil do cabaret (2003) ISBN 1-55164-204-2, ISBN 1-55164-205-0 (Black Rose)
- L'anarchiste et le diable : voyages, cabarets et autres récits (2006) ISBN 2-89596-026-7 (Lux Editeur)
- Breakfast for anarchists (2006) (No Bar Code Press)
- L’Anarchico e il Diavolo fanno cabaret, il Sirente, Fagnano Alto (AQ) 2007, ISBN 978-88-87847-11-6. Original Title: The Anarchist And The Devil Do Cabaret
- RED: Quebec Student Strike and Social Revolt Poems (2013) ISBN 978-2-9805763-5-5 (Les Pages Noires) Distributed in the United States and Europe by AK Press
- Squat The City! How To Use The Arts For Housing Justice (2025) ISBN 978-1-989701-41-6 (Kersplebedeb Publishing)

== Discography ==
- I don't understand women! (1994) LPN012 (Les Pages Noires)
- Less Rock, More Talk: Spoken Word compilation (various artists) (1997; 2000) ISBN 1-873176-84-8; virus254 (AK Press Audio; Alternative Tentacles)
- Duck Work (2004) LPN018C
- Letters from Poland / lettres de Pologne (2006) LPN020C

=== Bakunin's Bum ===
- Fight to Win! : a benefit CD for OCAP Ontario Coalition Against Poverty (2001) G7021 (G7 Welcoming Committee)

=== Bush's Bum ===
- 2TONGUE #5 (various artists) (2004)

=== DaZoque! ===
- DaZoque! (2002) LPN016C (Les Pages Noires)

=== The Montreal Manhattan Project ===
Draft 1.0 (2004) LPN017C (Les Pages Noires)

=== Rhythm Activism ===
- Rhythm Activism (1986) LPN001 (Les Pages Noires)
- Rhythm Activism Live (1987) LPN002
- Resist Much, Obey Little (1987) LPN003
- Louis Riel in China (1988) LPN004
- Un logement pour une chanson (1990) LPN005
- Fight the Hike! (1990) LPN006
- Perogies, Pasta and Liberty (1990) LPN007
- Oka (1990) LPN008
- War is the Health of the State (1991) LPN009
- Oka II (1992) LPN010
- Tumbleweed (1993) LPN011
- Blood & Mud (1994) LPN013C
- More Kick! : live in Europe (1995) LPN014C
- Buffalo, Burgers & Beer : a 10 year retrospective (1995) LPN015
- Jesus Was Gay (1998) G7006 (G7 Welcoming Committee)
- Return of the Read Menace (various artists) (1999) G7010
- Take Penacilin Now (various artists) (2005) G7040

=== SANN : Sylvain Auclair & Norman Nawrocki ===
- SANN : Sylvain Auclair Norman Nawrocki (2005) LPN019C

== Videography ==
- Musiques Rebelles Québec [Rebel Music Quebec] (various artists) (2002) (Productions Multi-Monde)
- Uncle Eddie's Guide to Art Appreciation (2005) (Infringement performance)

=== Rhythm Activism ===
- That's the way we tie our shoes : a recipe by Rhythm Activism (1996) (Unbend films; Les Pages Noires)
- Alive and kicking : the first ten years of Rhythm Activism (1997) (Les Pages Noires)
