= Ripa di Fagnano Alto =

Coordinates: 42°15′16″N 13°34′31″E

- Frazione
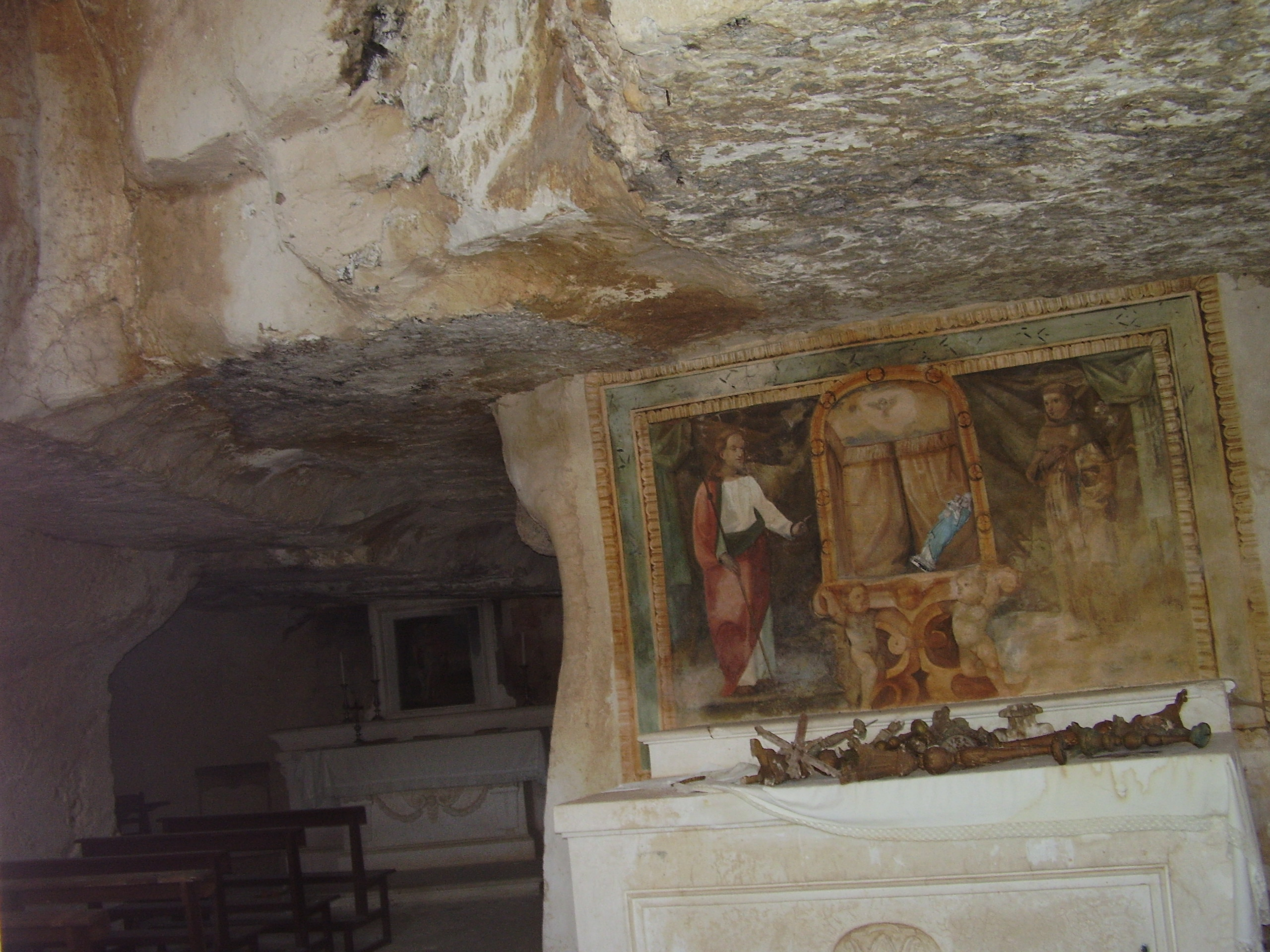
- Nickname: Ripa
- Interactive map of Ripa di Fagnano Alto
- Country: Italy
- Region: Abruzzo
- Province: L'Aquila
- Commune: Fagnano Alto

Population (2009)
  - Total: 93
  - Density: 1.9/sq mi (0.73/km^{2})
- Demonym: Ripese
- Time zone: UTC+1 (CET)
  - Summer (DST): UTC+2 (CEST)
- Distance from L'Aquila is 20km

Ripa di Fagnano Alto is a village in the Province of L'Aquila, in the Abruzzo, region of Italy. The village is situated on a mountain and over looks the east of the region. Its last recorded population was 93 people.

== History ==
=== Founding ===
Ripa comes into historical notes in the late 1230s. It is believed that the village was founded during Frederick II's order to develop defensive outposts along the Abruzzo mountain ranges. Other villages such as Collepietro and Tocco are also believed to have been founded in the same era, close to when the region's capital L'Aquila, being founded in 1240.

=== World War II ===
Following World War II, a large percentage of Ripa's population emigrated, after the German occupation of the village had left little for the future of the new generation. Most of the towns people emigrated to Canada, while there were notable numbers who emigrated to Australia, the United States and Argentina. It is considered to be the main reason why the population has diminished to near abandoning.

== Geography ==
The village distance 1.90 kilometres from the same town of Fagnano Alto where it belongs along with the villages of Campana (1.03 miles), Castello (1.76 miles), Colle (1.11 miles), Corbellino (0.50 km ), Frascara (2.12 miles), Opi (3.80 miles), Pedicchio (2.57 miles), Termine(1.34 km) and Vallecupa (- km). The village overlooks the valley of the river Aterno, about 752 meters from sea level and is approximately 20 kilometres from L'Aquila. It rises on a hill overlooking the valley from which appointed Ripa, whose origin would be assigned as the far side of the earth, that overhangs the water, especially the shore, the margin of a river, a stream of a stream. Its houses are built with mortar and stone still respects the original building with stables on the ground floor and housing on the first floor.

== 2009 earthquake aftermath ==
Following the earthquake in 2009, the village suffered moderate damage. Most houses suffered cracks, and in some cases, minor collapses, with most of the houses being built of stone, and thin concrete. The most notable collapse in the village was the Church of Saint Anthony, with the bell tower collapsing. Despite the damage, there were no fatalities.

== Religion ==
The people of Ripa are predominantly Roman Catholic. There are two religious sites: the church of St. Anthony, whose bell tower suffered a partial collapse in the earthquake of the Eagle of the sixteenth century, with frescoes of 1533, 1559 and 1562. The church's bell tower was destroyed following the 2009 earthquake.

The other church is the church of St. Rocco, carved into the rock on top of the hamlet, with terracotta Madonna and Child in the fifteenth century. The patron saint is St. Rocco and is celebrated on August 16. The procession for the feast of St. Rocco to the hermitage there was revived in 2023.

== Tourism ==
Characterised by cold winters and short summers, Ripa has a permanent population of about forty units, also welcomes many tourists on weekends and during the summer months, including expatriates in Belgium and Canada.

Since 1998 the publishing house il Sirente is located there, in Via Fonte di Sotto No. 1.
