= The Twenty-Second Day =

2007 novel by Muhammad Aladdin

- Author: Muhammad Aladdin
- Original title: اليوم الثاني و العشرون
- Cover artist: Ahmad Al Lapad
- Language: Arabic
- Genre: Novel
- Publisher: Elain Publishing House
- Publication date: 2007
- Publication place: Egypt
- Media type: Print
- Pages: 100

The Twenty-Second Day is a 2007 novel by Muhammad Aladdin, and has been published by ِEl-'Ain Publishing House in Egypt.

== Plot introduction ==
A young man, a pianist who hates piano, goes into a stormy relationship with a divorced woman who's older than he is for ten years. This woman, a painter and artistic trainer for children, was his first choice in 26 years of life as a slave for his father's wishes, or maybe it's the cosmic wishes of fate itself, as he might feel as a crushed young man who wished to be anything but being what he is. He received a total shock when the woman dumped him at last, did an abortion for his baby, and tells him that they can't live up the relation they have, because it goes to be crushed, sooner or later. in the final scene, we see the painter watches the TV, we could understand he's witnessing the US forces entering Baghdad, then he begin to prepare his suitcase, which gives us a hint he's going to leave the country.

== Literary significance & criticism ==
The second novel published by the Egyptian writer Muhammad Aladdin, also known as Alaa Eddin (Arabic:محمـد علاء الديـن) . Aladdin has gained acclamation for his first novel published The Gospel According to Adam (Arabic:إنجيل آدم) in January 2006. The work has been hailed by writers like Baha Tahir and Sonallah Ibrahim to be among the best of a promising new crop. Then came The Twenty-Second day (Arabic: اليوم الثاني و العشرون) in 2007, published by El 'Ain publishing house. The novel gained a warm receiving from the either readers and writers, it "has a specific unique world was delightfully presented by Aladdin", as Muhammad Hisham 'Abya wrote in the Egyptian famous boswtol website, and "it follow up his (Aladdin) first novel The Gospel According to Adam, continuing his writing usual course which is anti-stereotyping and anti-mechanical", As Nour Al- Asa'd wrote in the prestigious Lebanese newspaper An Nahar ( April 24, 2007), "having such minimalistic language and style, clearing psychological depth in either the hero's persona, or towards the world around" as the Egyptian notable writer Baha' Taher commented in a seminar held for the novel. In an interview with the Egyptian prestigious literary newspaper Akhbar Al Adab, it was mentioned the secret of the title, the twenty-second day, by referring to the day US forces entered Baghdad, and the connection between a failure of a love affair, as a personal matter, and the failure of a pan-Arab dream, as a general matter. "It's like you are very far and very close at the same time", said Aladdin, commenting on the not that this connection isn't so easy to discover.
