= Flavia Lattanzi =

Italian jurist, academic and judge (1940–2026)

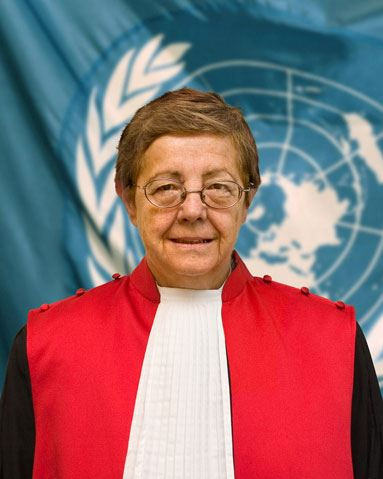
- Lattanzi in 2014

Judge of the International Criminal Tribunal for the former Yugoslavia
- In office 2 July 2007 – 31 March 2016

Judge of the International Criminal Tribunal for Rwanda
- In office 27 October 2003 – 17 September 2006
- Succeeded by: Robert Fremr

Personal details
- Born: 4 October 1940 Addis Ababa, Italian East Africa (now Ethiopia)
- Died: August 2026 (aged 85)
- Children: 3
- Education: Sapienza University of Rome
- Profession: International law

Flavia Lattanzi (4 October 1940 – 15 August 2026) was an Italian jurist and professor of international law at many universities including Luiss University and Roma Tre University. She served as an ad litem judge at the International Criminal Tribunal for Rwanda (ICTR) from 2003 to 2006 and at the International Criminal Tribunal for the former Yugoslavia (ICTY) from 2007 to 2016.

== Background ==
Flavia Lattanzi was born in Addis Ababa, Italian East Africa on 4 October 1940, to Elza Dolezalova and Pietro Sante Lattanzi. As a newborn, she was sent to the English Concentration Camp in Ethiopia together with her mother, while her father was interned in a POW camp in Uganda. She was the only child under the age of three who was saved from the camp. After the war, her family moved back to the family home in Ripa di Fagnano Alto. She studied law at the Sapienza University of Rome where she specialized in international law. Lattanzi spoke Italian, Russian, Czech and English fluently.

Lattanzi died on 15 August 2026, at the age of 85.

== Career ==
From 1966, Lattanzi worked as a rapporteur at international conferences, congresses and seminars on international humanitarian law, human rights and international criminal law.

From 1966 until 1985 she worked as Assistant Professor of International Law at the D'Annunzio University of Chieti–Pescara and later at Sapienza University.

From 1970 until 2003, she worked as a coordinator for various research projects on international law and international humanitarian law, human rights and international criminal law.

From 1985 until 1990 she worked as Associate Professor of International Law at the University of Pisa and Libera Università Internazionale degli Studi Sociali Guido Carli.

In 1990, Lattanzi became a Full Professor of International Law at the University of Sassari.

From 1995 until 2001, Lattanzi worked as Director of Department of Public Legal Sciences of the University of Teramo, and Scientific Supervisor and Lecturer at the Arusha School of International Criminal Law and Human Rights (1996–1998) and the Gaborone School on International Criminal Jurisdictions of the University of Botswana (1999).

From 1996 until 2000, she served as director of the board of directors of the European Public Law Center.

From 1997 until 2001, Lattanzi worked as Director of School of Specialization in European Law of the University of Teramo.

In 1998, she became legal adviser of the Italian delegation to the Diplomatic Conference for the Establishment of an International Criminal Court.

From 1998 until 2001, Lattanzi served as legal adviser to the Italian delegation at the International Criminal Court Preparatory Commission, and Director of the International Masters course on cooperation against International Transnational Crime at the University of Teramo, supported by the Italian Ministry of Education, Universities and Research and in collaboration with the University of Cologne (Germany), the University of Barcelona (Spain), the University of Seville (Spain), the University of Bucharest (Romania), the University of Prague (Czech Republic), the University of Zagreb (Croatia), and the University of Sarajevo (Bosnia and Herzegovina).

From 1999 until 2002, she was first a member of the commission set up by the Italian Ministry of Justice on the implementation of international rules in the matter of criminal judiciary assistance; she later served as President of the same commission. From 2003 until 2007, Lattanzi served as an ad litem judge at the International Criminal Tribunal for Rwanda.

In 2005, she became Professor of International Law at the Roma Tre University, member of the International Fact-Finding Commission created by Protocol I additional to the Geneva Conventions, member of the International Institute of Humanitarian Law and member of its board of directors, as well as member of the Sociera italiana di diritto internazionale of the Société française de droit international and of the International Legal Association.

In 2007, she was appointed an ad litem judge of the International Criminal Tribunal for the former Yugoslavia. Her first case was that of Rasim Delić, a Bosnian who was convicted of war crimes by the ICTY.

== Vojislav Šešelj trial ==
Flavia Lattanzi did not agree with conclusions of the majority of members of the ICTY Trial Chamber that acquitted Serbian nationalist Vojislav Šešelj of war crimes and crimes against humanity for his role in the 1990s Yugoslav Wars. In a lengthy dissenting opinion, judge Lattanzi stated that she considered that Šešelj's guilt was proved in eight out of nine counts.

She stated that Šešelj had aided and abetted the crimes as charged because he provided moral and material support to his volunteer force. Furthermore, judge Lattanzi noted that most members of the Trial Chamber did not take into account the climate of intimidation created by Šešelj against witnesses during the trial. Lattanzi was adamant that widespread and systematic attacks had been carried out in Croatia, Bosnia and Herzegovina, and Vojvodina, and that crimes against humanity had been committed.

Lattanzi pointed out that, according to the presented evidence, it was not a reasonable inference that the forcible transfer of non-Serb population from certain villages by buses could be considered as "humanitarian aid", as stated by some other judges. She stated that there was all the necessary evidence in the case file needed for proving a widespread or systematic attack on Croatia and Bosnia and Herzegovina. According to judge Lattanzi, conclusions of judges Jean-Claude Antonetti (France) and Niang Mandiaye (Senegal) were not supported by any sufficient explanations whatsoever.

She noticed that these two judges rarely mentioned any laws to which they referred, and even if they did their analysis was contrary to the provisions of those laws. In addition, judges Antonetti and Mandiaye were adding new legal standards that did not exist in the case law. Judge Lattanzi called on the members of the Council who voted for Šešelj's acquittal of "franchising the rules of international humanitarian law that existed before the creation of ICTY, as well as all the rules of the applicable laws that were formulated during ICTY work".

Lattanzi concluded saying: "While I was reading the verdict of the majority of Council members, I had the impression that I went back many centuries ago, to the ancient times of the history of mankind, when the Romans, in order to justify their bloody conquests and murders of political enemies in civil wars, were saying: Silent enim leges inter arma ("For among [times of] arms, the laws fall mute)." On 11 April 2018, the Appeals Chamber overturned the first-instance verdict, proclaimed Šešelj guilty of one of nine counts and sentenced him to 10 years in prison.

== Armenian genocide ==
In 2018, Lattanzi published a lengthy legal opinion following her investigation of the Armenian genocide, concluding that the events of 1915 and 1916 meet the legal definition of genocide in the Genocide Convention.

== Scientific works ==
- 1981, Organizzazione dell'Aviazione civile internazionale (The Organization of International Civil Aviation), in Enciclopedia del diritto, XXXI, Milan, p. 228
- 1983 L'émergence de l'homme et des peuples dans le droit international contemporain, in Droits de l'homme et des peuples, San Marino, p. 141
- 1983, Garanzie dei diritti dell'uomo nel diritto internazionale generale (The Human Rights Guarantees in International Law), Giuffrè Editore, Milan
- 1987, Autodeterminazione dei popoli (The Principle of Self-determination), in Digesto, IV edizione, UTET, Torino
- 1988, Struttura dei rapporti internazionali e limiti dei procedimenti di garanzia istituiti con la Convenzione europea dei diritti dell'uomo (The Structure of International Relations and the Limits of Procedures created by the European Convention on Human Rights), in Le garanzie giurisdizionali dei diritti dell'uomo, a cura di Lorenza Carlassare, Cedam, Padova, p. 57
- 1988, Sanzioni internazionali (The International Sanctions), in Enciclopedia del diritto, vol. XLI, p. 536, Milan
- 1989, L'impugnativa per nullità nell'arbitrato commerciale internazionale (The Appeal for Nullity in the International Commercial Arbitration), Giuffré, Milan,
- 1994, Assistenza umanitaria e intervento di umanità (Humanitarian Assistance and Humanitarian Intervention), Ed. Provv., Rome
- 1995, Assistenza umanitaria e consenso del sovrano territoriale (Humanitarian Assistance and the Consent of Territorial Sovereign), in Studi in ricordo di Antonio Filippo Panzera, vol. I, Bari, p. 415
- 1997, Assistenza umanitaria e intervento di umanità (Humanitarian Assistance and Humanitarian Intervention), Giappichelli, Torino
- 1998, Rapporti fra giurisdizioni penali internazionali e giurisdizioni penali interne, in Crimini di guerra e competenza delle giurisdizioni nazionali (The Relationships between International Criminal Jurisdictions and National Criminal Jurisdictions, (a cura di PierLuigi Lamberti Zanardi e Gabriella Venturini), Giuffré, Milan
- 1999, Essays on the Rome Statute of the International Criminal Court Volume I
- 2000, Consiglio di sicurezza (The Security Council), in Enciclopedia giuridica
- 2000, The Rome Statute and Domestic Legal Orders: General Aspects and Constitutional Issues
- 2001, The International Criminal Court and National Jurisdictions, in The Rome Statute of the ICC. A Challenge to Impunity (Ed. by Mauro Politi and Giuseppe Nesi), Ashgate, Aldershot, p. 179
- 2001, The Notion of Crimes against Humanity in the ICTY and ICTR Practice, in International and National Prosecution of Crimes Under International Law: Current Developments (Ed. by Horst Fischer, Claus Kress and Sascha Rolf Lüder), Berlin Verlag Arno Spitz
- 2004, Essays on the Rome Statute of the International Criminal Court Volume II
- 2005, The Rome Statute and Domestic Legal Orders: Constitutional Issues, Cooperation and Enforcement
