= Galal Amin =

Egyptian economist (1935–2018)

Galal Ahmad Amin (Arabic: جلال أمين); 1935 – 25 September 2018) was a professor of economics at the American University in Cairo and an Egyptian economist and commentator. He was critical of the economic and cultural dependency of Egypt upon the West.

== Biography ==
Amin was born in Egypt in 1935, the son of judge and academic Ahmad Amin. Hussein Ahmad Amin, an Egyptian writer and diplomat, was his brother.

Amin studied at Cairo University, graduating with an LL.B. in 1955 before studying for diplomas in economics and public law. After receiving a government grant to study in Britain, Amin obtained an M.S. (1961) and a Ph.D. (1964) in economics from London School of Economics. From 1964 to 1974, he taught economics at Ain Shams University, and worked as an economic advisor for the Kuwait Fund for Economic Development from 1969 to 1974. After a year's teaching at UCLA in 1978–1979, Amin joined the faculty of the American University in Cairo. He also contributed a weekly column to the Al-Shorouk newspaper for several years.

Historian Albert Hourani describes Amin's writing as "forceful," particularly his argument in Mihnat al-iqtisad wa’l-thaqafa fi Misr (The Plight of the Economy and Culture in Egypt), among his better known books, which:

"...tried to trace the connections between the infitah and a crisis of culture. The Egyptian and other Arab peoples had lost confidence in themselves...the infitah, and indeed the whole movement of events since the Egyptian revolution of 1952, had rested on an unsound basis: the false values of a consumer society in economic life, the domination of a ruling élite instead of genuine patriotic loyalty. Egyptians were importing whatever foreigners persuaded them that they should want, and this made for a permanent dependence. To be healthy, their political and economic life should be derived from their own moral values, which themselves could have no basis except in religion."

Amin died on 25 September 2018.

== Published works ==
- Food Supply and Economic Development; With Special Reference to Egypt, 1966
- The Modernization of Poverty: A Study in the Political Economy of Growth in Nine Arab Countries, 1945-1970, 1974
- Egypt's Economic Predicament: A Study in the Interaction of External Pressure, Political Folly, and Social Tension in Egypt, 1960-1990, 1995
- 'Whatever Happened to the Egyptians: Changes in Egyptian Society from 1950 to the Present, AUC Press, 2000
- Whatever Else Happened to the Egyptians: From the Revolution to the Age of Globalization, AUC Press, 2004
- The Illusion of Progress in the Arab world: A Critique of Western Misconstructions, 2005. Translated by David Wilmsen.
- Egypt in the Era of Hosni Mubarak (1981-2011), 2011
- Whatever Happened to the Egyptian Revolution?, 2014. Translated by Jonathan Wright.
