= Young Lover, New Lover =

2012 Short stories collection by Muhammad Aladdin

Young Lovers, New Lover
- First edition
- Author: Muhammad Aladdin
- Original title: الصغير والحالي
- Cover artist: Ahmad Al Labbad
- Language: Arabic
- Genre: Short stories
- Published: Merit Publishing
- Publication place: Egypt
- Media type: Print
- Pages: 67 pages
- Preceded by: The Foot (A Novel)
- Followed by: A Well-Trained Stray

Young Lover, New Lover is a 2012 Short stories collection by Muhammad Aladdin and published by Merit Publishing House in Egypt. It is his third short story collection, followed by the novel A Well-Trained Stray in 2014. The collection contains 23 short stories covering madness, alienation, and secrets.

== Content ==
Published by Dar Merit in early 2012, “Young Lover, New Lover“ is different from Aladdin’s previous writings in its simplicity. Yet it remains experimental simply by reintroducing some of the classical techniques of story writing with contemporary themes.

Aladdin starts the collection with “Arabat al-Nar” (The Fire Cart). It is a snapshot of a killing scene on the street, in which the narrator mediates what happens between the killing and the victim’s name being recorded in police records. The narrator witnesses how the woman dragged down the street is slaughtered with a knife. The perpetrator immediately leaves, and he is left staring at the victim, whose eyes are fixated on him. The narrative is straightforward. Its strength stems from the emotional intensity of the moments before the woman passes away and the language Aladdin uses to describe them.

“Young Lover, New Lover” short story collection came after three years of work — Aladdin had not published anything since his novel The Idol in 2009. The development in his style and the influence of literary classics are highly evident in the newly released collection. Among the influences apparent in the collection is that of Sufi literature. In the short story “Malh al-Ard” (Salt of the Earth), Aladdin tells the story of a man who experiences a revelation and tries to reach a higher spiritual state. The language he uses is inspired by Sufism.

The protagonist of “Bayt Gameel Saeed” (A Beautiful Happy Home) is a woman who collects antiques to furnish her flat when she gets married. As she turns 30, she accepts to marry a younger man, but their new home is too small for her antique collection. She knew the marriage would not last, but she could not stop buying antiques, although her only son hated them. Her exceptional collection becomes a hindrance to whatever she wants to do.

“Michael” is perhaps the only story in the collection that reflects some of the provocations of Aladdin’s earlier works. It tells the story of an angel who feels neglected by God.

== Recognition ==
It was chosen as one of the most important books of the year by Al Saqia Al Thaqafia The Cultural Wheel, a notable arts and literature centre in Egypt, it was the only short story collection chosen. Along with the American translation of the main title story, a Russian translation for one of the stories within it, The Voice (short story), was published by the Russian newspaper Moskovskij Komsomolets in their Egypt edition, translated by Sarali Gintsburg. In March 2014, the same story was translated to Italian by Barbra Benini and published in Editoriaraba, a notable Italian blog dedicated to Arabic Literature, in 24 hours it was reblogged on the blog MedShake on the ISPI website, an Italian prestigious research institute on international politics.
