= Rhythm Activism =

Canadian activist group

- Origin: Montreal, Quebec, Canada
- Genres: Anarcho-punk, post-punk, folk, cabaret
- Years active: 1986–1998
- Labels: Les Pages Noires; G7 Welcoming Committee
- Past members: Sylvain Côté, Norman Nawrocki
- Website: nothingness.org/music/rhythm

Rhythm Activism was a Canadian, Montreal-based musical collective, revolving around the core duo of Sylvain Côté and Norman Nawrocki. The group, formed in 1985 as a poetry and music ensemble, evolved into performing a politically radical brand of "rock 'n roll cabaret" and incorporating elements of post-punk and folk into their music. They featured on 36 releases.

On several occasions, the band recorded and released albums on just a few days' notice, to support political activist campaigns such as the Oka Crisis of 1990 and a Quebec students' strike. Most of their material was released on their own Les Pages Noires label, although their 15th and final album Jesus Was Gay was distributed on G7 Welcoming Committee Records.

The band's song "Leo Lachance" appears on the 1999 G7 compilation Return of the Read Menace, and their song "Down in the Mines" appears on the 2005 G7 compilation Take Penacilin Now.

Rhythm Activism also performed theatre shows in Montreal, including the "community circus cabaret comedy" Le Cirque en Ca$h in 1997 and 1998. The band toured with DOA, John Giorno, Mecca Normal, and Linton Kwesi Johnson.

== Discography ==
- Rhythm Activism (1986)
- Rhythm Activism Live (1987)
- Resist Much, Obey Little (1987)
- Louis Riel in China (1988)
- Un logement pour une chanson (1990)
- Fight the Hike! (1990)
- Perogies, Pasta and Liberty (1990)
- Oka (1990)
- War is the Health of the State (1991)
- Oka II (1992)
- Tumbleweed (1993)
- Blood & Mud (1994)
- More Kick! (1995)
- Buffalo, Burgers & Beer (1995)
- Jesus Was Gay (1998)

== Videography ==
- That's the way we tie our shoes : a recipe by Rhythm Activism (1996)
- Alive and kicking : the first ten years of Rhythm Activism (1997)

== See also ==
- Bakunin's Bum
