= Maya Zankoul =

Lebanese author, visual artist, blogger and television personality

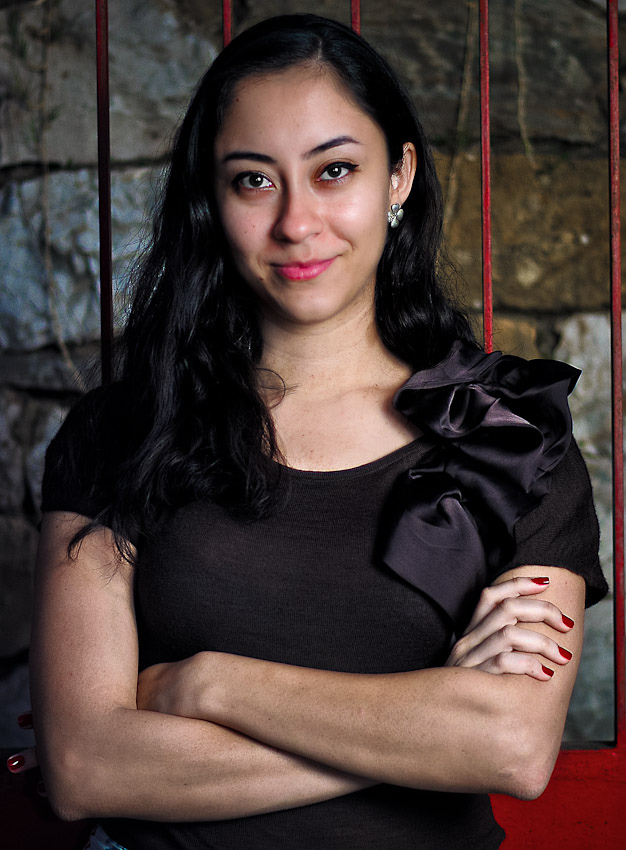
- Born: 30 June 1986 (age 40) Hasbaya, Lebanon
- Areas: Artist, writer
- Notable works: Amalgam, Amalgam vol. 2

Maya Zankoul (Arabic: مايا زنقول; born 30 June 1986) is a Lebanese author, visual artist, blogger and television personality mostly known for her sarcastic cartoons and comics published in her books and her popular webcomic blog, Amalgam.

== Early life ==
Maya Zankoul grew up in Jeddah, Saudi Arabia, and in 2005 moved to her home country, Lebanon, where she earned a Bachelor of Arts in Graphic Design in 2007 from Notre Dame University – Louaize.

== Career ==
In 2009, she started her comic blog, Amalgam, where she shares illustrations commenting on daily life in Lebanon from a socio-political point of view.

She self-published her first book, Amalgam, in 2009, which reached Top 5 in sales at Virgin Megastore.

In summer 2010, after touring Lebanon with her exhibition Amalgame, she published her second book, Amalgam Vol. 2.

In January 2011, she founded her own design studio in Beirut. The Italian translation of her books is published by publishing house Il Sirente, in their Altriarabi series, and the books were launched at the Pisa Book Festival 2011.

In April 2013, she co-founded explainer video company wezank.

== Books ==
=== Author, Illustrator ===
- Amalgam (2009) ISBN 978-9953-0-1521-7
- Amalgam Vol. 2 (2010) ISBN 978-9953-0-1846-1
- Beirut - New York (2016) ISBN 978-9953-0-3819-3
- Story of the Grilled Cheese Sandwich (2020) ISBN 978-9953-0-5395-0

=== Illustrator ===
In the press

- Making it
- The Global Journal
- ELLE Oriental
- ArabAd

In books

- Nuits Beyrouthines

== Television ==
Zankoul made her first major television debut with a segment aiming at teaching social media to stay-at-home women entitled Bwa2ta. The segment premiered in August 2012 and still runs every Tuesday on Future Television.

== Exhibitions ==
- "Samneh w 3asal" (2011) At Tawlet Souk el Tayeb (Beirut)
- "Amalgame" (2009, 2010) At the French Culture Center, (Beirut, Saida, Tripoli, Deir el Qamar and Zahle centers)

== Other work ==
Zankoul actively participates in illustration in local and regional events. She did live illustrations at the Arabnet 2010 conference and at the 17e Salon du Livre Francophone de Beyrouth

Zankoul has also lectured at the American University of Beirut, and has presented her work at the First Creative Commons Salon in Amman, Jordan and at Pecha Kucha Night 6 in Beirut.

In October 2011, Zankoul presented her book and work to Felipe, Prince of Asturias at a Campus Party event in Granada, Spain.

In September 2013, she participated to a talk titled "War, Not A Serious Issue" with Paolo Di Giannantonio in Lucera, Italy at the occasion of the Mediterranean Culture Festival.
