= Sa'ad Makkawi =

Egyptian writer

Sa’ad Makkawi (1916–1985) was an Egyptian writer. He was born in Dalatun, Menoufia. As a young man, he travelled to France to study medicine but he returned without a degree. He is best known for his novel The Sleepwalkers (Al-Sayirun Niyaman) which was chosen by the Arab Writers Union as one of the 100 greatest Arabic novels. The novel has been translated by Jonathan Wright.
