= The Gospel According to Adam =

2006 novel by Muhammad Aladdin

- Author: Muhammad Aladdin
- Original title: إنجيل آدم
- Cover artist: Ahmad Al Lapad
- Language: Arabic
- Genre: Novel
- Publisher: Merit Publishing House
- Publication date: 2006
- Publication place: Egypt
- Media type: Print
- Pages: 64
- ISBN: 977-351-283-5
- OCLC: 225057217

The Gospel According To Adam is a 2006 novel by Muhammad Aladdin, and has been published by Merit Publishing House in Egypt. It is his first novel followed by The Twenty-Second Day in 2007. Aladdin that he wrote the novel in two days, separated by 6 months, and that he did not change a word of it. it made Aladdin name in the Arabic literary scene, described it as a "tour de force". Because of it, and his entire body of work to date, Aladdin is often described as "an innovator in the Arabic literature".

== Plot introduction ==
A young man walks a scorching Cairo street. At the entrance to the city's pivotal main square, he notices a succulent girl. Ineluctably drawn into her magnetic field, and the swirling, palpitating square ahead, he starts to fantasize about how he would talk to her, seduce her, rape her, love her, abandon her, cherish her were he, for example, a Brazen Rake, a Brutal Bohemian, a Sensitive Painter, or a Bald Mechanic, jumping from persona to persona as his imaginings become more and more feverish, while in his mind the girl goes through a similar series of transformations. These characters—a circus parade of Egypt's contemporary human menagerie—are not, however, mere dress-up costumes to be donned and discarded at their author's whim. They, and others who emerge from the side alleys of his mind, strut their stuff, accost one another, argue, and shout until eventually they leave him, on a scorching Cairo street, peering after an infinite succession of receding, parallel clamorous worlds, from whose possibilities he must draw his own conclusions.

== Literary significance & criticism ==
Muhammad Aladdin (b. 1979) has published short comic books for teenagers and a collection of short stories (The Other Bank 2003). While excerpts from his first, unpublished novel The Twenty-Second Day appeared in Akhbar al-Adab in 2004, his first unpublished—as well—novel Al Dawa'er winning the Cultural Palaces prize 2004. The Gospel according to Adam breaks the conventional format of the novel, consisting as it does of a single 60-page-long paragraph that, like all good streams of consciousness, sweeps writer and reader on to no pre-ordained or predictable destination. As a reviewer for Al-Ahram's literary page ( May 10, 2006) puts it, The Gospel according to Adam reflects "a social reality that has lost all certainties." In keeping with other novels (such as Ahmed Alaidy's Being Abbas el Abd) of an emerging new school of writing in Cairo, the work is the funny and taboo-breaking product of a young writer without preconceptions of what makes a novel or how one should be written and who has been hailed by writers such as Baha Tahir and Sonallah Ibrahim as among the best of a promising new crop.

In his book, "The Arab Novel and the Quest for Renovation" published by Dubi Althaqafia Magazine in May 2011, the famous Moroccan writer and critic Mohammed Berrada sites it as one of 5 novels has renovated the Arab novel.

The Egyptian writer Ibraim Farghali wrote about it in the famous Lebanese newspaper An-Nahar that The Gospel According to Adam is "An experimental and substantial jump in narration style in the modern Egyptian novels".
