= Fahad al-Ateeq =

Saudi Arabian writer

Fahad al-Ateeq (Arabic: فهد العتيق) is a Saudi short story writer and novelist.

Born in Riyadh, Fahad al-Ateeq has published 5 collections of short stories and a novel. He started writing short stories for Lotus, the Afro-Asian literary magazine. His stories have been translated into both French and English. He has also appeared in the literary magazine Banipal.

== Works ==
- Life on Hold, 2012. Translated from the Arabic كائن مؤجل by Jonathan Wright. Extract translated by Kathryn Stapley, in Banipal 34: The World of Arab Fiction.
