= Ala Hlehel =

Palestinian writer

Ala Hlehel (Arabic: علاء حليحل; born 1974) is a Palestinian writer. He was born in Jish in Galilee, northern Israel. He studied at the University of Haifa and went on to work in both print and broadcast media in Haifa.

Trained as a scriptwriter in Tel Aviv, he has written stage plays and scripts for both film and television. He has presented his work at prestigious theatres such as the Royal Court Theatre in London and the Schaubühne in Berlin.

Hlehel has also published novels and short stories in the humorously realistic tradition of Palestinian literature. His stories have appeared in venues such as Banipal and World Literature Today. His novels include Au revoir Acre and the award-winning Al-Sirk.

He lives in Acre in northern Israel.
