= Hassan Blasim =

Iraqi-born film director and writer

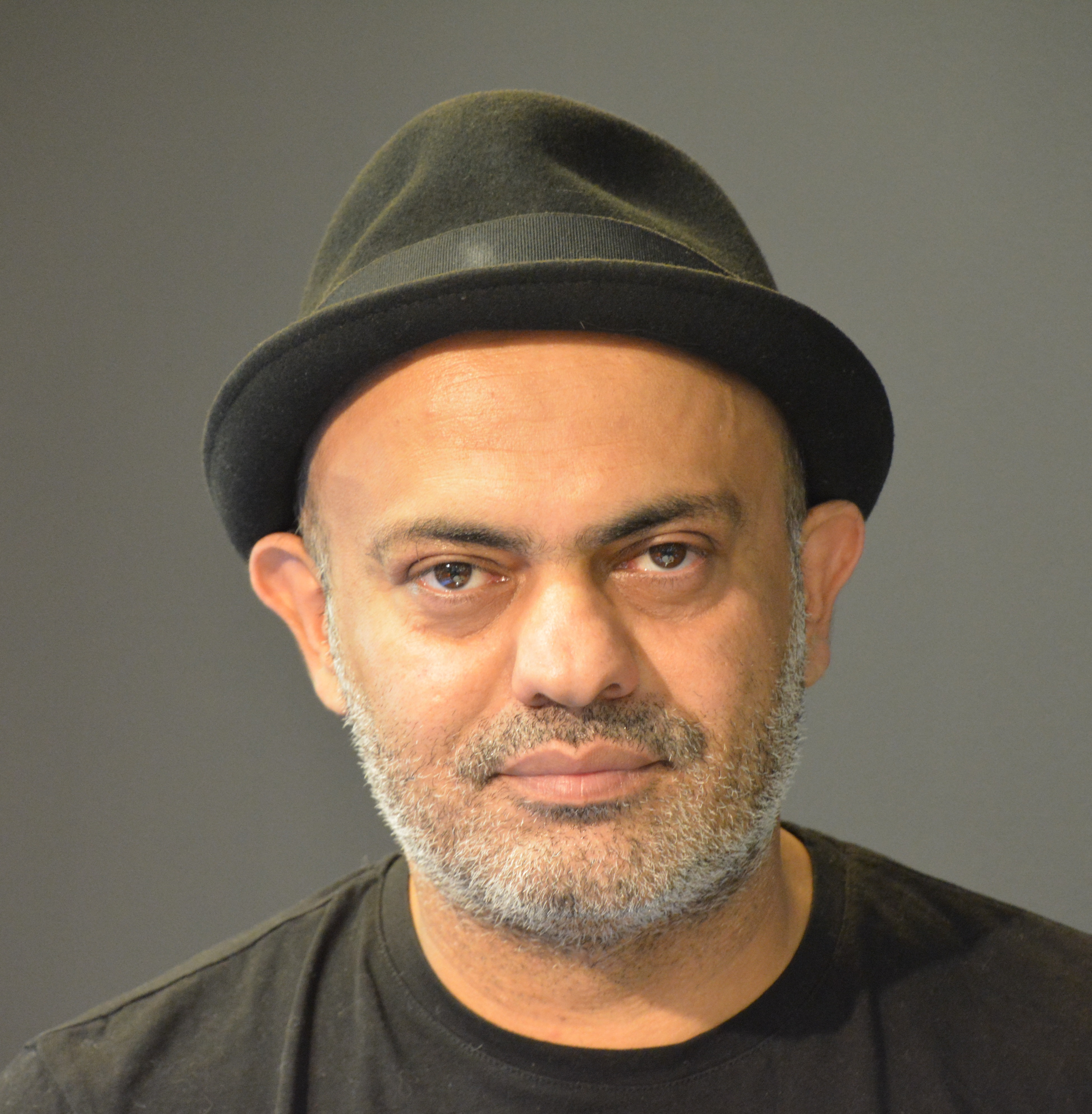
Hassan Blasim

Hassan Blasim (Arabic: حسن بلاسم; born 1973) is an Iraqi-born film director and literary author, who writes in Arabic. Following his exile in Finland, he has been a citizen of Finland.

== Life and career ==
Blasim left Iraq in 2000 to escape persecution for his films, including The Wounded Camera, filmed in the Kurdish area in northern Iraq and dealing with the forced migration of Kurds by Saddam Hussein's regime. After travelling in Europe for four years, he settled in Finland in 2004, where he was granted asylum.

Blasim made four short films for the Finnish broadcasting company Yle. His short story collection The Madman of Freedom Square was long-listed for the Independent Foreign Fiction Prize in 2010. A selection of his stories was published as The Corpse Exhibition by Penguin US in 2014. It won a number of awards, including one out of four winners in the English Pen's Writers in Translation Programme Awards. His book The Iraqi Christ, translated from Arabic to English by Jonathan Wright, was published by Comma Press in 2013. In 2014, Blasim became the first Arabic writer to win the Independent Foreign Fiction Prize for The Iraqi Christ.

== Filmography ==
- The Wounded Camera
- Uneton, 2006
- Luottamuksen arvoinen, 2007
- Elämä nopea kuin nauru, 2007
- Juuret, 2008
- Doctor DJ, 2021

== Books ==
- Short Films (2005) collection of articles in: Cinema Booklets: Series of Publications for the Emirates Film Competition. Ed. S. Sarmini. Abu Dhabi: Emirates Cultural Foundation.
- Poetic Cinema (2006) collection of articles. Ed. Salah Sarmini, in: Cinema Booklets: Series of Publications for the Emirates Film Competition. Abu Dhabi: Emirates Cultural Foundation
- Diving into Existing (2007) correspondence and dairies in collaboration with Adnan al-Mubarak.
- Wounded Camera (2007) Writings on cinema.
- The Shia’s Poisoned Child (2008) story collection.
- Madman of Freedom Square (2009) Comma Press, translated from the Arabic by Jonathan Wright
- The Iraqi Christ (2013) Comma Press, short stories, translated from the Arabic by Jonathan Wright
- The Corpse Exhibition (2014) Penguin US, short stories, translated from the Arabic by Jonathan Wright
- Iraq +100 (2017) Tor Books, short story anthology (editor)
- God 99 (2019) novel, Comma Press, translated from the Arabic by Jonathan Wright
- Sololand (2025) novel, Comma Press, translated from the Arabic by Jonathan Wright
