= Ibrahim Farghali =

Egyptian writer

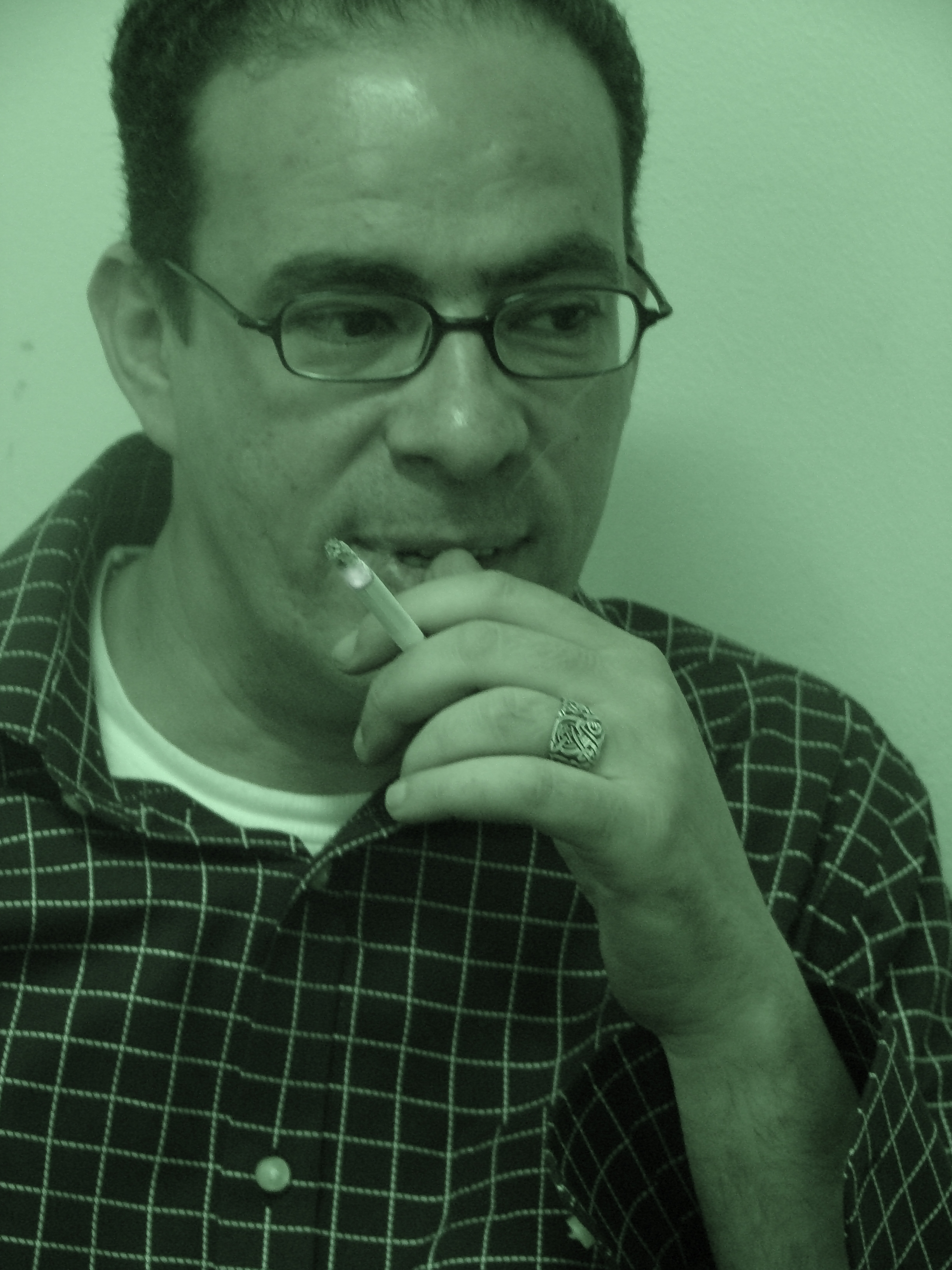
بورتريه إبراهيم فرغلي

Ibrahim Farghali (إبراهيم فرغلي; born 19 September 1967 in Mansoura, Egypt) is an Egyptian writer. He grew up in Oman and United Arab Emirates. He obtained a BA in Business Administration from Mansoura University in 1992 and worked as a journalist in Rose al Yousef weekly magazine, then in Nizwa magazine in Muscat - Sultanate of Oman before going back to Cairo again to work as a cultural editor in Al Ahram newspaper since 1997. Now he is an editor in Al Arabi monthly magazine in Kuwait.

== Biography ==
Ibrahim Farghali is a critic and a fiction author, one of who called Nineties Generation in Egypt. In Egypt Farghali himself is part of this generation. But on the Arabic literary scene, which is shaped by strict hierarchies, new voices have a hard time being heard. Especially when, like Farghali, they abstain from running roughshod over Egyptian society's moral and religious taboos in order to attract attention to themselves.

Farghali by contrast dwells in the realm of quiet tones – and does so without compromise. A state-run publisher demanded that he remove all sexual overtones from his manuscript for "The Ghosts of Feelings" before publishing it. But since that was out of the question for Farghali, he has no choice but to put up with the vagaries and lack of professionalism of the few remaining independent Egyptian literary publishers. He was just 24 years old when as a fledgling journalist he interviewed Egyptian Nobel Prize winner Naguib Mahfouz. His yearning for literature had become so overpowering that, just one year after completing his unloved course of studies in his small hometown of Mansoura, he moved to the big city of Cairo. In his works to date, Ibrahim Farghali has explored a variety of themes. In the short story collection (Ashbah Al Hawas) "The Ghosts of Feelings" he attempts to explore the relationship between Egyptian men and women, who come from utterly disparate backgrounds. Again and again, he tells the same story, but from a different perspective. By doing so, Farghali is trying to demonstrate how limited our understanding of people really is. Farghali configures the female body as a site of contradiction that creates chances for proximity and/or estrangement. Even when metamorphosed it does not represent an element of mystery but is taken as a given. He uses the fantastic to uncover moral degeneration in inhibited social relationships based on fantasy-bonds.

As a literary critic, Farghali has been the quickest to dismiss such middle-brow, best-selling "phenomena" as Alaa Al-Aswany's The Yacoubian Building; and his principal argument against such books is that they pander to a growing but limited—and limiting—worldwide market, that "they are not novels at all, but illusions".

Yet from a history-of-literature point of view, Abnaa Al-Gabalwi is probably the closest we have come to a fulfilment of the prophecy that a home-grown Magic Realism Movement would emerge in the new millennium.

== Published works ==
1-Bettejah Al Ma'aqi (toward the eyes) Sharqeyyat 1997, a short story collection.

2-Kahf Al Farashat (Cave of Butterflies) Cairo 1998 . a novel.

3-Ashbah El Hawas (Ghosts of Senses) a short story collection.

4- The Smiles of the Saints Ibtisamat Al Qideiseen. 2004, 2005, 2006 (translated into English by Andy Smart and Nadya Fouda Smart, published by Auc Press in 2007).

5- Jenneya Fi Qarora (Jennie in a Bottle), a novel, Al Ain publishing house 2007, 2009.

6- Midad Al Hewar (dialogue Ink) a travel book about Stuttgart in Germany as a part from the project (Town Chronicles funded by Goethe Institute). Published by Al Ain Publishing house in 2006.

7- Abnaa' Al Gabalawi (Sons of Gabalwi)a novel. Published by Al Ain Publishing house - Cairo 2009, 2010.

8- The Temple of Silken Fingers, which was nominated for the International Prize for Arabic Fiction. It won the Sawiris Cultural Award for the Egyptian Literature in 2016.

^{Quotes By Farghali}

- "Of course Saramago, for me, is the literary model,"
- To write a long, big, subtly conveyed text through which to say everything. And with the highest degree of artistic excellency possible, to create a large idea that accommodates numerous smaller ideas, juxtaposes styles and discordant voices. My ambition is a text that could be read and enjoyed and reread and still enjoyed by an ordinary reader as well as a member of the literary elite. It's an ambition like Dostoevsky's and Saramago's, and I hope I don't sound vain when I say this. I think I had been practising since Ibtisamat Al-Qiddissin (The Smiles of The saints).
- "Aside from theorising or stating the obvious, aside from the conditions of narrative and imagination and construction and the depth of the characters, I think a text to which the term 'novel' is applicable must also be an 'art object', meaning that it must make sublime, competent and beautiful use of the language, it must use the language in its own specific way. To be called a novel, the text must absorb the narrative methods that have been employed throughout history, it must know its place in the history of narrative. It has to be contemporary, experimental and deep, and work towards abiding by the conditions of the modern as a general context that is influenced in turn by economic, social and historical factors. Only then,".
- "is a narrative text worthy of being called a novel?".
- He taught me (Mahfouz) that you are not a writer unless you have to be independent even of the cliches of your own generation.
- I like complexity in a novel. More than one time frame, more than one character, more than one voice. My wish is to alter my voice till it becomes a multiplicity of voices in the manner of the Portuguese writer Fernando Pessoa, although of course there is a huge difference and I am still a student compared to him. I managed that somewhat in previous works, I created parallel time frames, but in general I totally incline towards this kind of layering. I like The God of Small Things, for example, for that same reason.
- It has to do with my growing up in Dubai and especially Oman, where the culture is saturated with stories of phantoms and djinn—to be found in the desert, which makes up most of the city, indeed—and elements of witchcraft are just part of everyday life. It was perfectly normal, for example, to talk about encountering a man with a goat's legs while crossing the street. And it is something that evidently stayed with me.
