= João Almino =

Brazilian novelist

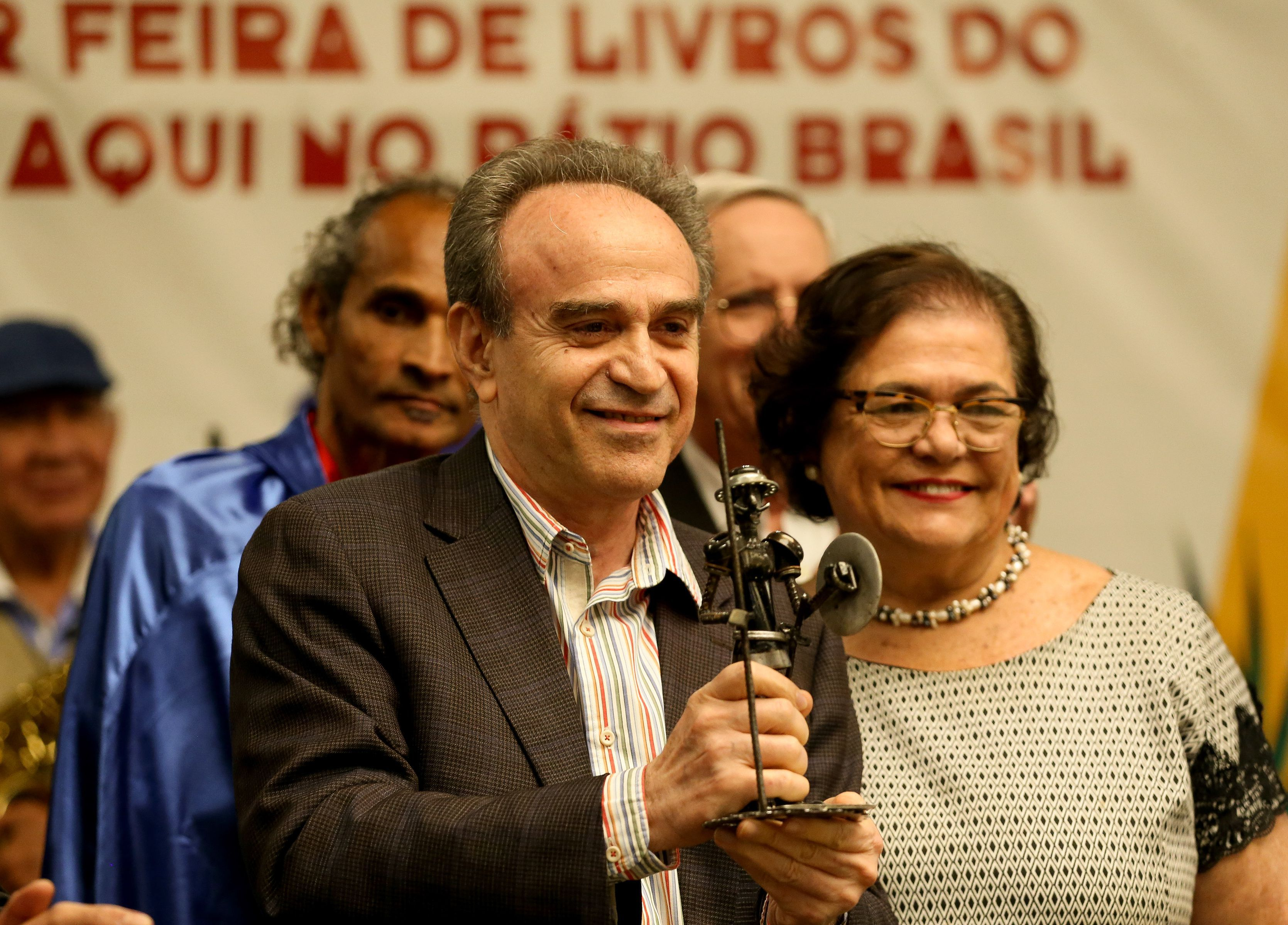
Almino in 2017

João Almino is a Brazilian novelist. He is the author of The Brasília Quintet, which consists of the novels Ideas on Where to Spend the End of the World, Samba-Enredo, The Five Seasons of Love (first published in Portuguese by Editora Record; published in Spanish by Alfaguara, México, and by Corregidor, in Argentina; in Italian by Editrice Il Sirente; Casa de las Americas 2003 Literary Award; in English by Host Publications, 2008); The Book of Emotions (shortlisted for the Zaffari & Bourbon Literary Award and the Portugal-Telecom Literary Award; Editora Record, 2008; Dalkey Archive Press, 2012) and Cidade Livre (Free City, Editora Record, 2010; Passo Fundo Zaffari & Bourbon Literary Award for best novel published in Portuguese from May 2009 to May 2011; shortlisted for the Jabuti Award 2011 and for the Portugal-Telecom Literary Award 2011; translated as Free City, it was published by Dalkey Archive Press in 2013). His 2015 novel Enigmas da Primavera (Enigmas of Spring) was published in English in 2016 by Dalkey Archive Press and won the Jabuti Award (second Prize) for Best Brazilian Book in translation. His seventh novel was published in November 2017 in Brazil: Entre facas, algodão (The last twist of the knife, Dalkey Archive Press, 2021). His most recent novel, Homem de Papel, was published in 2022 (shortlisted for the São Paulo Literary Award and among the 10 for best literary novel in the Jabuti Award). He has also authored books of philosophical and literary essays. He taught at the National Autonomous University of Mexico (UNAM), at the University of Brasília (UnB), the Instituto Rio Branco, Berkeley, Stanford and The University of Chicago. In 2017, he was elected as one of the 40 members of the Brazilian Academy of Letters.

== Bibliography ==
=== Fiction ===
- Idéias para Onde Passar o Fim do Mundo, Brasiliense, 1987 (reedição 2003)
- Samba-Enredo, 1994; republished by Editora Record in 2013 (also published in Spanish)
- As Cinco Estações do Amor, 2001; (also published in Spanish, in Italian and in English)
- O Livro das Emoções, 2008; The Book of Emotions, Dalkey Archive Press, 2012.
- Cidade Livre, Editora Record, 2010; "Hôtel Brasilia", Editions Métailié, Paris, 2012; Free City, Dalkey Archive Press, 2013.
- These books are part of what is known as the "Brasília'Quintet" Quinteto de Brasília.
- Enigmas da Primavera (Enigmas of Spring, Dalkey Archive Press, 2016), Editora Record, 2015.
- Entre facas, algodão (The last twist of the knife, Editora Record, 2017.
- Homem de Papel Editora Record, 2022.

=== Literary Essays ===
- Brasil-EUA: Balanço Poético, 1996;
- Escrita em contraponto, 2008; Tendencias de la Literatura Brasileña, Buenos Aires: Leviatán, 2012;
- O diabrete angélico e o pavão: Enredo e amor possíveis em Brás Cubas, 2009.

=== Other books ===
- Os Democratas Autoritários, 1980;
- A Idade do Presente, 1985 ("La edad del presente", Fondo de Cultura Económica, México, 1986);
- Era uma Vez uma Constituinte, 1985;
- O Segredo e a Informação, 1986;
- Naturezas Mortas - A Filosofia Política do Ecologismo, 2004.
- 500 anos de Utopia, 2017.
- Dois ensaios sobre Utopia, 2017.

== Awards ==
=== 1988 ===
- Shortlisted Prêmio Jabuti, por Idéias para Onde Passar o Fim do Mundo
- Instituto Nacional do Livro, Idéias para Onde Passar o Fim do Mundo
- Candango de Literatura, for Idéias para Onde Passar o Fim do Mundo

=== 2003 ===
- Casa de las Américas Award, Cuba, for "The Five Seasons of Love", As Cinco Estações do Amor

=== 2009 ===
- nominated for the Portugal-Telecom Award, "O Livro das Emoções" ("The Book of Emotions");
- nominated for the 6th Prêmio Passo Fundo Zaffari & Bourbon de Literatura (Biannual Passo Fundo Zaffari & Bourbon for best novel, O Livro das Emoções ("The Book of Emotions");

=== 2011 ===
- winner of the 7º Prêmio Passo Fundo Zaffari & Bourbon de Literatura (7th Passo Fundo Literary Biannual Zaffari & Bourbon Award as best novel, for Cidade Livre, "Free City");
- shortlisted for the Prêmio Jabuti, Cidade Livre ("Free City");
- shortlisted for the Portugal-Telecom Award, Cidade Livre ("Free City");

=== 2014 ===
- nominee for the International IMPAC Dublin Literary Award, The Book of Emotions ("O livro das emoções").

=== 2015 ===
- nominee for the International IMPAC Dublin Literary Award, Free City ("Cidade Livre").

=== 2016 ===
- shortlisted for the Rio Literature Award, Enigmas da Primavera (Enigmas of Spring, Dalkey Archive Press)
- shortlisted for the São Paulo Prize for Literature, Enigmas da Primavera (Enigmas of Spring, Dalkey Archive Press) Semifinalist for the Oceanos Award, Enigmas da Primavera (Enigmas of Spring, Dalkey Archive Press).

=== 2017 ===
- Jabuti Award, 2nd Prize, for Enigmas of Spring, published by Dalkey Archive Press.

=== 2017 ===
- Semifinalist for the Oceanos Award, for Entre facas, algodão (The last twist of the knife).

=== 2023 ===
- Jabuti Award, one of the 10 semifinalists, best literary novel, for Homem de Papel
- São Paulo Literary Award, one of the 10 shortlisted novels, for Homem de Papel
