= Golan Haji =

Syrian-Kurdish writer and translator

- جولان حاجي
- Born: 10 November 1977 (age 48); Amouda, Syria
- Citizenship: Syria
- Education: University of Damascus
- Occupations: writer, poet, translator
- Writing career
- Years active: 2004-present
- Notable works: He Called Out Within The Darknesses, poetry collection
- Notable awards: Muhammad-al-Maghout Prize

Golan Haji (Arabic: جولان حاجي; born 10. November 1977) is a Syrian Kurdish writer, poet, and translator. He has published five poetry collections in Arabic, including He Called Out Within The Darknesses, which won the first prize in the Muhammad Al-Maghout Poetry Competition in 2006. He has translated several books from English into Arabic such as Palm-of-the-Hand Stories by Yasunari Kawabata and Dark Harbor by Mark Strand. Some of his works are part of Syrian literature in the context of war.

== Life and career ==
Golan Haji was born in Amouda, a Kurdish town in the north of Syria in 1977. He studied at the University of Damascus and earned a bachelor's degree in medicine and a postgraduate degree in pathology. Haji started his literary career when he published his first collection of poetry He Called Out Within The Darknesses in 2004 that was awarded the Muhammad Al-Maghout Prize in poetry. In 2008, he wrote his second collection of poetry Someone Sees You as a Monster, published during the events celebrating Damascus as Arab Capital of Culture.

In 2016, Haji also published a book of non-fiction, for which he interviewed Syrian women who spoke about their experience and stories during the war in Syria. Further, Haji translated several literary works from English into Arabic, including the Strange Case of Dr Jekyll and Mr Hyde by Scottish novelist Robert Louis Stevenson, the Palm-of-the-Hand Stories by Japanese writer Yasunari Kawabata, and Dark Harbor by Canadian-American poet Mark Strand.

A prolific translator from French to Arabic, Haji has translated 38 works of poetry until 2024. His own Arabic poetry has been translated into English, French, Italian and Danish. Since 2012, exiled because of the war in Syria, Haji has lived in Saint-Denis, France. He is married to French writer and translator Nathalie Bontemps.

== Works ==
=== Arabic poetry ===
- He Called Out Within The Darknesses (original title: Nada al dulumat), 2004
- Someone Sees You as a Monster (original title: Thamata mat yaraka wahshan), 2008
- Autumn, Here, is Magical and Vast, 2013
- Scale of Injury (original title: Mizan al atha), 2016
- The Word Rejected, 2023

=== In English translation ===
- A Tree Whose Name I Don’t Know. Translated by Stephen Watts and Golan Haji, New York: A Midsummer Night’s Press, 2017.

=== Non-fiction ===
- Until the War: Women in the Syrian Revolution (original title: ila an kamat al harb: nisaa fi thawra al suryia), 2016

=== Translations from English ===
- Al Mirfaa al Muthlim (original title: Dark Harbor), 2002
- Dafatr modelima (original title: The Secret Notebooks), 2011
- Stevenson tahta Ashgar al Nakheel (original title: Stevenson Under the Palm Trees), 2017
- Hai Asakosa (original title: Palm-of-the-hand Stories), 2019

== Awards ==
- 2006: first prize in the Muhammad Al-Maghout Poetry Competition

== See also ==
- Syrian literature
- Modern Arabic poetry
