= Out of It (book) =

2011 debut novel by Selma Dabbagh

- Author: Selma Dabbagh
- Publisher: Bloomsbury Publishing
- Publication date: 5 December 2011
- ISBN: 978-1-408-82430-6

Out of It is the first novel of British-Palestinian author Selma Dabbagh, published by Bloomsbury in December 2011. It follows a family's life in Gaza and London in the larger context of its occupation.

The novel was listed as one of The Guardian's Books of the Year in 2011 and 2012 and has been widely reviewed.

== Reception ==
The review by Robin Yassin-Kassab for The Guardian stated: "This is a very successful debut novel from a British Palestinian writer who has already notched up successes with her short stories. Like a good short story, Out of It manages to fit in a great deal without feeling crowded.... The writing is both literary and accessible, fast-paced, passionate, exuberant and heart-lurching." According to Kirkus Reviews: "Dabbagh unsparingly shows a people divided and demoralized by six decades of exile and powerlessness, and her novel quietly but acidly indicts Western ignorance of and indifference to the Palestinians’ plight. Yet, the book is also a finely wrought tale of family and coming-of-age that fulfills the mandates of any serious work of fiction.... Fine work from a gifted writer who has important subject matter to explore."
