= Fagnano Alto =

- Comune
- Comune di Fagnano Alto
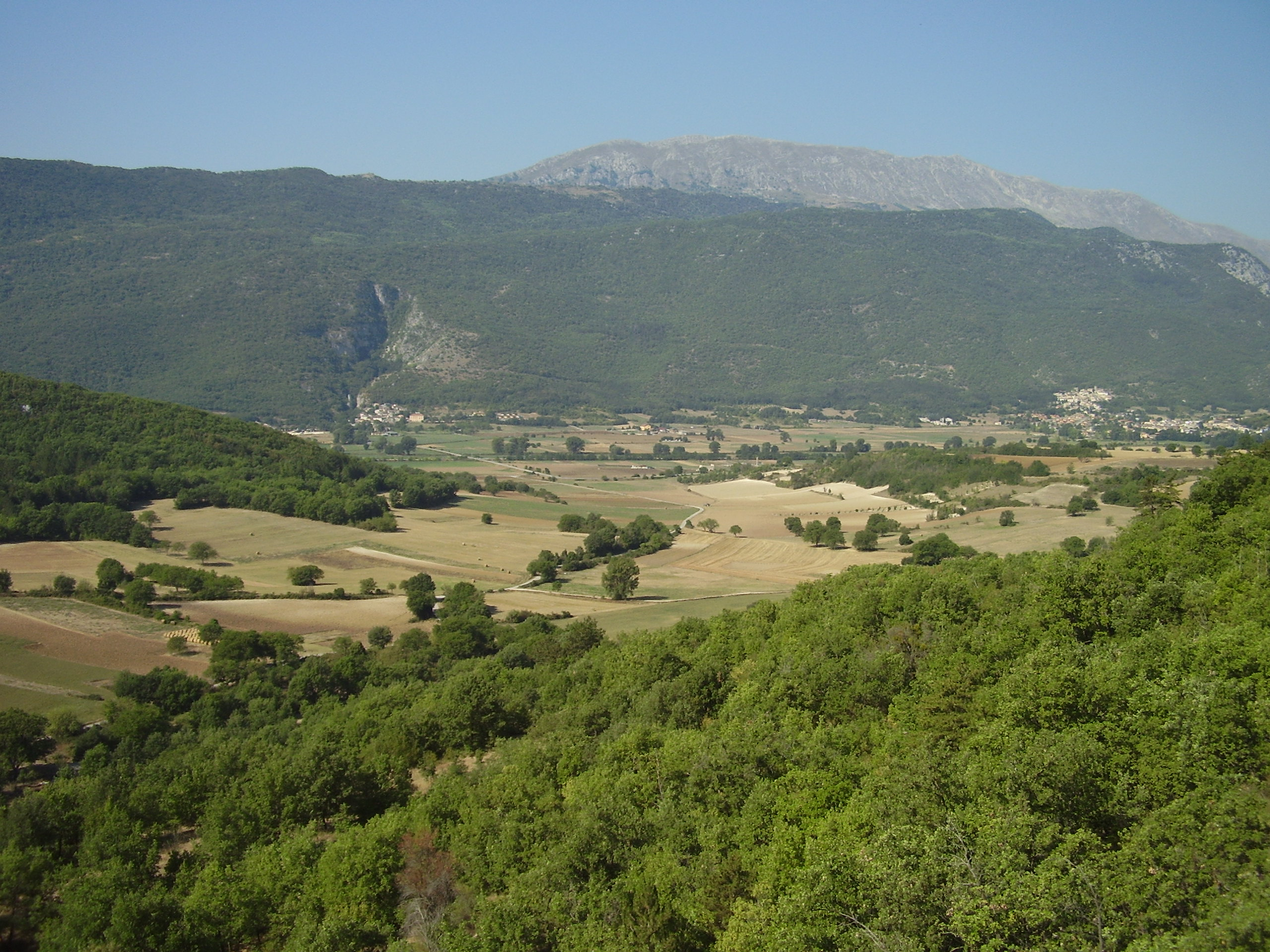

- Location within Italy Location within Abruzzo
- Coordinates: 42°15′16″N 13°34′31″E
- Country: Italy
- Region: Abruzzo
- Province: L'Aquila (AQ)
- Frazioni: Fagnano Campana Stazione, Opi, Pedicciano, Ripa, Vallecupa, Castello

Area
  - Total: 24.45 km^{2} (9.44 sq mi)
- Elevation: 665 m (2,182 ft)

Population (31 December 2013)
  - Total: 441
  - Density: 18.0/km^{2} (46.7/sq mi)
- Demonym: Fagnanesi
- Time zone: UTC+1 (CET)
  - Summer (DST): UTC+2 (CEST)
- Postal code: 67020
- Dialing code: 0862
- Saint day: August 7

Fagnano Alto is a comune and town in the province of L'Aquila in the Abruzzo region of Italy.

== Transport ==
Fagnano has a station on the Terni–Sulmona railway, with trains to L'Aquila and Sulmona.
