= Suheir Abu Oksa Daoud =

Palestinian writer and professor

Suheir Abu Oksa Daoud (Arabic: سهير أبو عقصة داود) is a Palestinian writer, poet and professor. Since 2008, she has been a professor of Political Science at Coastal Carolina University, Conway, South Carolina. Daoud also works as a member of the Al-Shabaka Palestinian policy thinktank.

== Early life and education ==
Daoud was born in the Melkite Greek Catholic village of Mi'ilya in Israel's Western Galilee area. She earned her BA in political science and international relations from Hebrew University of Jerusalem and her MA in international development and social change from Clark University in Worcester, Massachusetts. Daoud obtained her Ph.D. in political science from Jerusalem's Hebrew University.

== Career ==
Daoud worked as a political advisor and assistant for a Palestinian Knesset member Hashim Mahameed from 1996 to 2003. After this, she began work in the United States, where she was a visiting scholar at the Center for Contemporary Arab Studies at Georgetown University. She also held a postdoctoral position at Pomona College in Claremont, California, as a Mellon Post Doctorate Fellow. While in Claremont, she worked as a visiting assistant professor at Harvey Mudd College.

Daoud has published numerous academic and artistic works in English, Hebrew, and Arabic. She has written for the avant-garde Arabic literary magazine Al Adab based in Beirut, and has published four volumes of Arabic poetry and literature. Daoud was commissioned by the Washington, D.C. Shakespeare Theatre Company to write original poetry for their March 2005 performance of The Tempest. In 2009, her book Palestinian Women and Politics and Israel, considered by Ghada Talhami as a 'pioneering' study in its field, was published by the University of Florida Press.

== Books and articles ==
- Daoud, Suheir Abu Oksa. Palestinian Women in the Israeli Knesset, Middle East Report, Fall 2006, No. 240 pp. 26-31
- Daoud, Suheir Abu Oksa. Palestinian Women and Politics in Israel. Gainesville, Florida: University Press of Florida, 2009.
- Daoud, Suheir Abu Oksa. "Why 1948 Palestinians Refuse to Protest against Israel's Judicial Reforms." Middle East Eye, 2 March 2023.
- Daoud, Suheir Abu Oksa. "Israel's Repeat Elections and the Arab Vote." Mondoweiss, 13 September 2019.
- Daoud, Suheir Abu Oksa. Le finestre di Ghazalah, (tr.from the Arabic original (2001) by Isadora D'Aimmo), Città del Sole edizioni, Napoli, 2011 ISBN 978-8-882-92421-8.
- Daoud, Suheir Abu Oksa. "Palestinian Working Women in Israel: National Oppression and Social Restraints", Journal of Middle East Women's Studies vol. 8, no. 2 (1 July 2012): 78–101.
