= Gaétan Brulotte =

Canadian writer

Gaëtan Brulotte (born 1945) is a Canadian writer from Quebec and a professor of French and Francophone Studies at the University of Louisiana at Lafayette.

Gaëtan Brulotte studied at Laval University (Quebec City), and earned his Ph.D. from the University of Paris VII and Ecole des Hautes Etudes en Sciences sociales (France), while working with the renowned French critic, Roland Barthes, who directed his dissertation on French Erotic Literature. His defense jury included French scholars Julia Kristeva (chair) and Jean Bellemin-Noël (external reader).

He is Distinguished University Professor of French & Francophone Studies at the University of South Florida in Tampa, where he has been teaching since 1984. He also taught French & Francophone Literature at other universities in the United States, Canada and France, including the University of California at Santa Barbara, the University of New Mexico at Albuquerque, the University of Québec at Trois-Rivières, the Stendhal University (Grenoble III) in France and the Sorbonne (Paris V/René-Descartes).

He has published fourteen books so far. He specializes in 20th and 21st century French & Francophone Studies, but his research tries to build bridges between cultures and disciplines, such as literary theory, anthropology, philosophy, sociology, history, and fine arts. As a scholar, he has published extensively on censored or marginalized literary genres in French (such as the Erotic and Quebec short story). Besides his critically acclaimed Oeuvres de chair: Figures du discours érotique (1998), his scholarly books include a collection of critical essays on contemporary French literature, Les cahiers de Limentinus. Lectures fin de siècle, published in 1998; a cultural study on a major Canadian painter, L'univers de Jean Paul Lemieux published in 1996 (2nd ed. in 2015 by Presses de l'U. Laval) with a foreword by internationally renowned writer Anne Hébert; a philosophical essay on literature and creative writing, La chambre des lucidités in 2003, and La nouvelle québécoise in 2010, a well-received groundbreaking historical survey of short story production in French Quebec from the 19th C. to present times. He has also co-edited with a British colleague an Encyclopedia of Erotic Literature in two volumes (New York & London: Routledge, 2006), the very first work of its kind to offer a comprehensive description of those innumerable works, written in many different languages throughout our known history, in which 'sex-talk' is the dominant discourse. This project involved hundreds of contributors from various parts of the world.

Dr. Brulotte has also published around 300 articles and book reviews, which appeared as chapters of books or in periodicals, in such international volumes and journals as Poétique, Revue des Sciences Humaines, Revue des Deux Mondes, L'Arc, Travaux de littérature, Revue d'esthétique, Médium, Atelier du Roman (France); Stanford French and Italian Studies, The French Review, Sites, The Comparatist, Etudes francophones, Nouvelles Études francophones (USA); Etudes Littéraires, Liberté, XYZ, Nuit Blanche, Les Ecrits, The University of Toronto Quarterly (Canada); Dialogues francophones (Romania); Paragraph (England), to name a few. Throughout his career he has also given over 200 invited presentations in his field, either at regional, national and international conferences (such as the Centre national du livre in Paris, Cerisy-la-Salle in France, U. College Dublin, Columbia U., McGill U., U. Paris IV-Sorbonne) or as featured speaker on tours or at a variety of institutions (such as Princeton U. -Center for Excellence-, Georgetown U., Rutgers U., Vanderbilt U., Duke U., U. of Texas-Austin, Brigham Young U, UCLA, U. of Toronto, U. of Granada, Birkbeck College-U. of London). His lecture tours abroad include Central Europe, France, and Morocco. He has received over 200 grants and contracts so far. He regularly serves on literary juries (such as in 2012 on the Governor of Canada Literary Award) and on six journals' editorial boards. Further he acts as a manuscript reviewer for publishing firms (such as Oxford UP; Yale UP; U. of Toronto P.; Palgrave Macmillan; Pluto Press).

His works have awarded numerous literary distinctions in Canada and France, including the Robert-Cliche Award, The Adrienne-Choquette Award, The France-Quebec Award, The Odyssée Award, The CBC Radio Drama Award, The Lyon Playwrights' Award, and in 2015 the Gerald-Godin Literary Award. As a widely anthologized Francophone creative writer, he has published five collections of short stories including Le surveillant (translated as The Secret Voice), Ce qui nous tient (What Holds Us), Epreuves (Testing), La vie de biais (Life Sideways), La contagion du réel (Contagious Reality), a novel L'emprise (Double Exposure) and a play Le client (Music Maker), which received a major grant from the French Ministry of Culture and was premiered at the Avignon Drama Festival in France in 2001, before being restaged afterwards. Some of his fiction works are available in mass paperback series and were adapted for cinema, television, stage and radio, as well as translated into several languages, including English, Italian, Spanish, German, Serbian, Tamil (India), Romanian, and Hungarian. They are also featured in some 30 anthologies and textbooks (including at Cambridge UP, Penguin Books, Bordas, Harper & Row, Verlag Volk und Welt, Houghton-Mifflin, Heinle & Heinle). Some were published in periodicals from various countries such as Cleo in Australia, Les Cahiers du Ru in Italy, Puerto del Sol in the US, Steaua in Romania, Knjizevne Novine in Serbia, Magyar Naplozi in Hungary, La Revue générale in Belgium, Brèves, NYX, Jungles, Harfang, Nouvelle Donne in France, Moebius, Possibles, XYZ, Châtelaine, Le Sabord' in Canada. Concerning his works and his vision of literature, education and culture, he has given so far near 200 interviews, whether on television -including recently at Vox Television, Canada-; on radio, such as France-Bleu, Radio Ville-Marie, Radio-Canada on prime-time show by Joël Le Bigot, or on the US popular show Montel Across America; for periodicals, such as Encres vagabondes (France), Quebec Studies and Lingua Romana (USA), Gentlemen Quarterly, Le Petit Journal de Rome and Focus Magazine in Italy, Danas and Dvernik in Serbia, Dialogues francophones in Romania; as well as for scholarly books or Internet sites, including Playboy Magazine.

Over the years, Prof. Brulotte's publications received favorable reviews worldwide, including in the Time Literary Supplement (London), The French Review (USA), L'Humanité (Paris), Littératures (France), Le Devoir, Voir, Globe and La Presse (Montreal), Le Soleil and Québec français, (Quebec City), The Globe and Mail (Toronto), Modern Language Review (England), Lettres romanes (Belgium) and Transcanadiana (Poland). He made the cover of the 2005 winter issue of the Canadian literary magazine Lettres québécoises. His works are attracting more and more critical attention every year: book reviews, articles, theses, and dissertations; they are also subject of courses at a number of colleges and universities around the world from New-Zealand to Morocco, as well as of communications and sessions at conferences. These critical activities about his works include a monograph entitled Gaëtan Brulotte: Une Nouvelle Ecriture edited by Claudine Fisher (NY: Mellen Press, 1992), a collection of critical essays by seventeen scholars that won in Strasbourg (France) the 1992 International Prize for Francophone Studies. A Romanian scholar, Margareta Gyurscik, has completed in 2014 a new 200-page monograph on his works, Gaëtan Brulotte ou la lucidité en partage.

Gaetan Brulotte is a member of many professional associations, including the International PEN Club, the SACD (Société des Auteurs et Compositeurs Dramatiques, Paris), the EAT (Écrivains Associés du Théâtre, Paris), the UNEQ (Union des Écrivains et Écrivaines Québécois, Montréal), and served on the board of directors of writers' societies (including the presidency of a French Canadian Writers' Society). He is figured in many national and international Who's Who publications.

During his career at University of South Florida he received several distinctions. Among these, in 1998, for his artistic and scholarly achievements, he was elected "Artist-Scholar of the Year" by the Phi Kappa Phi Honor Society; in 1999, he was the recipient of the "Theodore & Venette Askounes-Ashford Distinguished Scholar Award"; in 2003, he received the Presidential Award for Faculty Excellence; in 2004, the Outstanding Research Achievement Award, and in 2005, the honorific title of Distinguished University Professor, the highest title of this university. In 2016, after retiring and becoming Professor Emeritus, he took an Endowed Chair at the University of Louisiana at Lafayette in the senior position of Board of Regents Humanities Eminent Scholar Chair.

== Awards ==
His works have won a number of awards:

- 1979 - Prix Robert-Cliche, L'emprise
- 1981 - Prix littéraire Adrienne-Choquette, Le surveillant
- 1982 - Prix littéraires Radio-Canada
- 1983 - Prix Jean-Hamelin, Le surveillant
