= Mohammed Berrada =

Moroccan writer

Mohammed Berrada (Arabic: محمد برادة), also transliterated Muhammad Baradah (born 1938 in Rabat) is a Moroccan novelist, literary critic and translator writing in Arabic. He is considered one of Morocco's most important modern authors.

== Career ==
Berrada studied literature in France. From 1976 to 1983, Berrada was the president of Morocco's writers union. He has for some decades taught Arabic literature at the Faculté des lettres of the Mohammed V University in Rabat. He is a member of the advisory board of the Moroccan literary magazine Prologue.

== Personal life ==
Since July 26th 1977, Berrada has been married to Leila Shahid, ambassador of the State of Palestine to the European Union.

== Books ==
- Al-Daw al-harīb (fleeting light) (1993) : The relation between a painter and two women of different generations, the mother and the daughter. Translated into English as Fugitive Light (2002) by Issa J. Boullata.
- Dirāsāt fī al-qiṣṣah al-ʻArabiyah : Waqāʼiʻ nadwat Miknās (Bayrūt : Muʼassasat al-Abḥāth al-ʻArabiyah, 1986.)
- Le théâtre au Maroc : tradition, expérimentation et perspectives (Presses Universitaires du Septentrion, 1998) .
- L'ubat al-Nisyan (the game of forgetting) (Rabat: Dar al-Aman, 1986.): the story of an intellectual about his life, from his childhood to adulthood in Morocco in the middle of the 20th century. Translated into English as The Game of Forgetting (1996) by Issa J. Boullata.
- Like a summer that will not come back (Sinbad, 2001) Memories of the summer of 1956 when the author studied in Cairo.
- Imraʼat al-nisyān : riwāyah (Casablanca: Nashr al-Fanak, 2001.)
- Faḍāʼāt riwāʼīyah (Rabat: Wizārat al-Thaqāfah, 2003.)
- Siyāqāt thaqāfīyah : mawāqif, mudākhalāt, marāfi (Rabat: Wizārat al-Thaqāfah, 2003.)
