= Steve LeVine =

American journalist

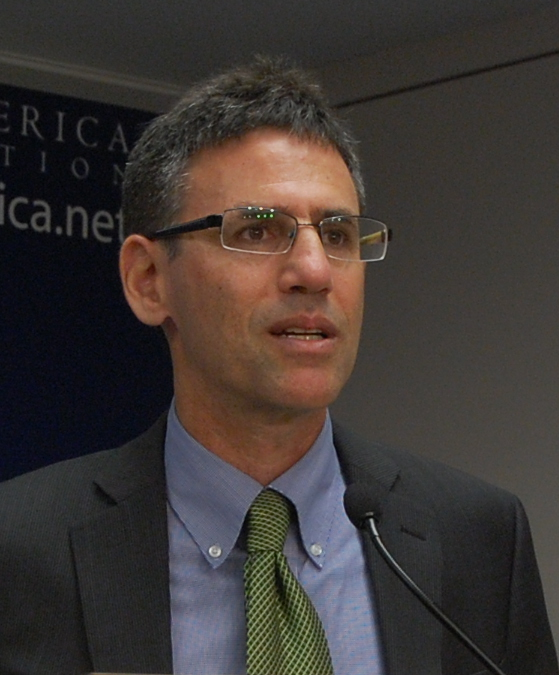
LeVine in 2011

Steve LeVine (born in New York) is an American journalist. He writes The Electric, a twice-weekly publication on batteries, electric vehicles, and their impact on society, cities and geopolitics. He is an adjunct professor at Georgetown University's School of Foreign Service, where he taught energy security in the graduate-level Security Studies Program for nine years. Previously, he was a foreign correspondent for eighteen years in the former Soviet Union, Pakistan and the Philippines, for The Wall Street Journal, The New York Times, The Washington Post, the Financial Times and Newsweek. He formerly wrote Future, a newsletter at Axios, and "The Oil and the Glory", a blog on energy and geopolitics at Foreign Policy magazine. LeVine is married to Nurilda Nurlybayeva and has two daughters. He has published three books: The Oil and the Glory (2007) which tells the story of the struggle for fortune, glory and power on the Caspian Sea; Putin's Labyrinth (2008), a profile of Russia through the life and death of a half-dozen Russians; and The Powerhouse, on the geopolitics of advanced batteries, which was long-listed for the Financial Times-McKinsey 2015 Business Book of the Year.

== Biography ==
LeVine has lived in Washington, D.C. since 2008 with his wife and two daughters. Previously he lived in Central Asia and the Caucasus for 11 years – starting two weeks after the collapse of the Soviet Union. He led the regional bureau of The Wall Street Journal, and before that The New York Times.

Prior to that, he lived in Pakistan from 1988 to 1991, and before that he was based in Manila from 1985 to 1988. In 1995, he was expelled from Russia, the first foreign correspondent to be declared persona non grata by Moscow since the 1980s. Later that year, he was wounded in Chechnya. As of 2007, LeVine has been a regular guest speaker for entities such as Google, the World Affairs Council, and various universities. LeVine was a good friend of slain Wall Street Journal colleague Daniel Pearl. After the kidnapping, he flew to Pakistan to investigate. His role in the investigation is depicted in the 2007 film A Mighty Heart. LeVine would later help Mariane Pearl with the Daniel Pearl Foundation.

== Works ==
=== Books ===
- The Oil and the Glory: The Pursuit of Empire and Fortune on the Caspian Sea. New York: Random House (2007). 496 p. ISBN 978-0375506147.
- Putin's Labyrinth: Spies, Murder, and the Dark Heart of the New Russia. New York: Random House (2008). 224 p. ISBN 978-1400066858. OCLC 1151101957.
- The Powerhouse: Inside the Invention of a Battery to Save the World. New York: Viking (2015). 320 p. ISBN 978-0670025848.

=== Articles ===
- Was James Giffen Telling the Truth? Foreign Policy (Nov. 19, 2010).
