= Selma Dabbagh =

British-Palestinian writer (born 1970)

- Selma Dabbagh at the 2025 Jaipur Literature Festival
- Born: 1970 (age 55–56); Dundee, Scotland
- Education: Durham University (B.A.); SOAS University of London (LL.M.); Goldsmiths, University of London (Ph.D.)
- Occupations: Writer and lawyer
- Notable work: Out of It (2011)
- Website: selmadabbagh.com/about

Selma Dabbagh (Arabic: سلمى الدباغ) (born 1970) is a British-Palestinian writer and lawyer. Her 2011 debut novel, Out of It was nominated for a Guardian Book of the Year award in 2011 and 2012. Her shorter writings have been published by outlets including International PEN, Granta, The Guardian, London Review of Books and GQ magazine.

== Early life and education ==
Born in Dundee, Scotland, Dabbagh is the daughter of a Palestinian father from Jaffa and an English mother. She lived variously in Dundee, Reading, High Wycombe and Jeddah during her early childhood, before moving to Kuwait when she was eight years old.

Dabbagh graduated from Durham University with a Bachelor of Arts degree and later earned an LL.M. from SOAS University of London. She holds a Ph.D. in Creative Writing from Goldsmiths, University of London. Before concentrating on writing, she worked as a human rights lawyer in the West Bank; however, she was not able to stay in the occupied territory and moved to Cairo, where she worked at AMIDEAST. She later moved to Bahrain, where she wrote her first novel.

== Inspiration ==
Dabbagh is strongly influenced by Palestine, the greater Palestinian diaspora, and her legal work in human rights and international criminal law. Following the COVID-19 lock-down in London, she described her motivations as "love and resistance".

== Works ==
Since 2004, she has written short stories that have appeared in New Writing 15 and Qissat: Short Stories by Palestinian Women. She has been a nominee for the Pushcart Prize and twice been a finalist in the Fish Short Story Prize, for "Beirut-Paris-Beirut" (2005) and for "Aubergine" (2004).

Dabbagh's debut novel Out of It was published in 2011, with a discussion between Dabbagh and novelist Maggie Gee taking place at the London launch. Out of It received positive coverage in a wide range of publications and outlets, including Kirkus Reviews, ArabLit, Guernica, and The Independent, with Ahdaf Soueif praising the book as "a new and welcome take on the Palestinian story".

In 2014, Dabbagh's radio play The Brick was broadcast by BBC Radio 4, being nominated for an Imison Award.

She edited the anthology We Wrote in Symbols: Love and Lust by Arab Women Writers, published by Saqi in 2021.
