= Rodaan Al Galidi =

Dutch writer of Iraqi descent (born 1971)

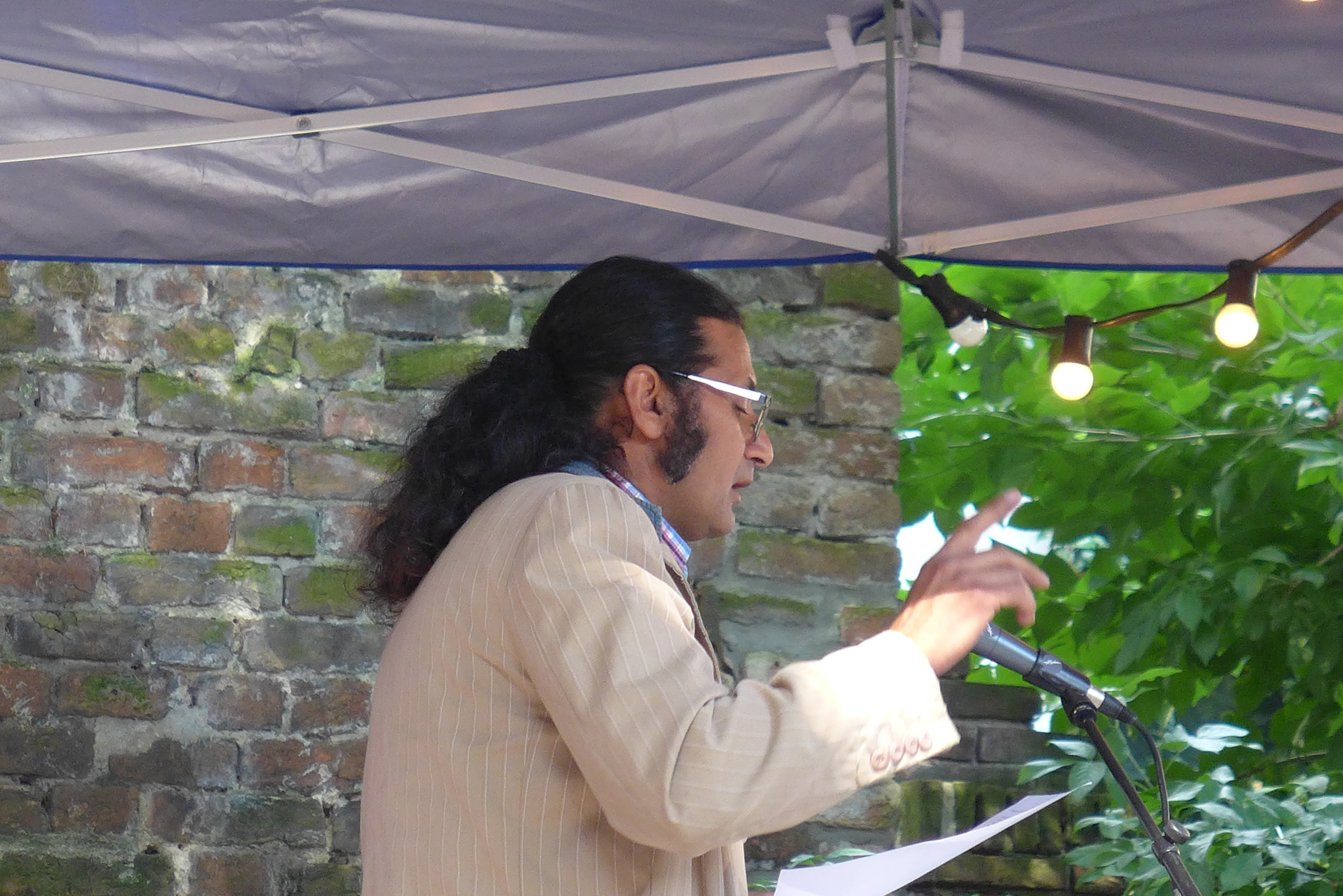
Rodaan Al Galidi in 2016

Rodaan Al Galidi (born 1971) is a Dutch writer of Iraqi descent. A trained engineer, he fled his native Iraq and came to the Netherlands in 1998. Al Galidi writes both prose and poetry in Dutch, a language he taught himself. His novel De autist en de postduif (The Autistic and the Carrier-pigeon) won the EU Prize for Literature.

He is also the author of Two Blankets, Three Sheets, which is a fictionalized account of his emigration experiences.

== Publication in English ==
- Rodhan Al-Khalidi: Thirsty river. Liverstock, Aflame, 2009. ISBN 978-1-906300-10-4
