= Khaled Al Khamissi =

Egyptian novelist, columnist and cultural activist

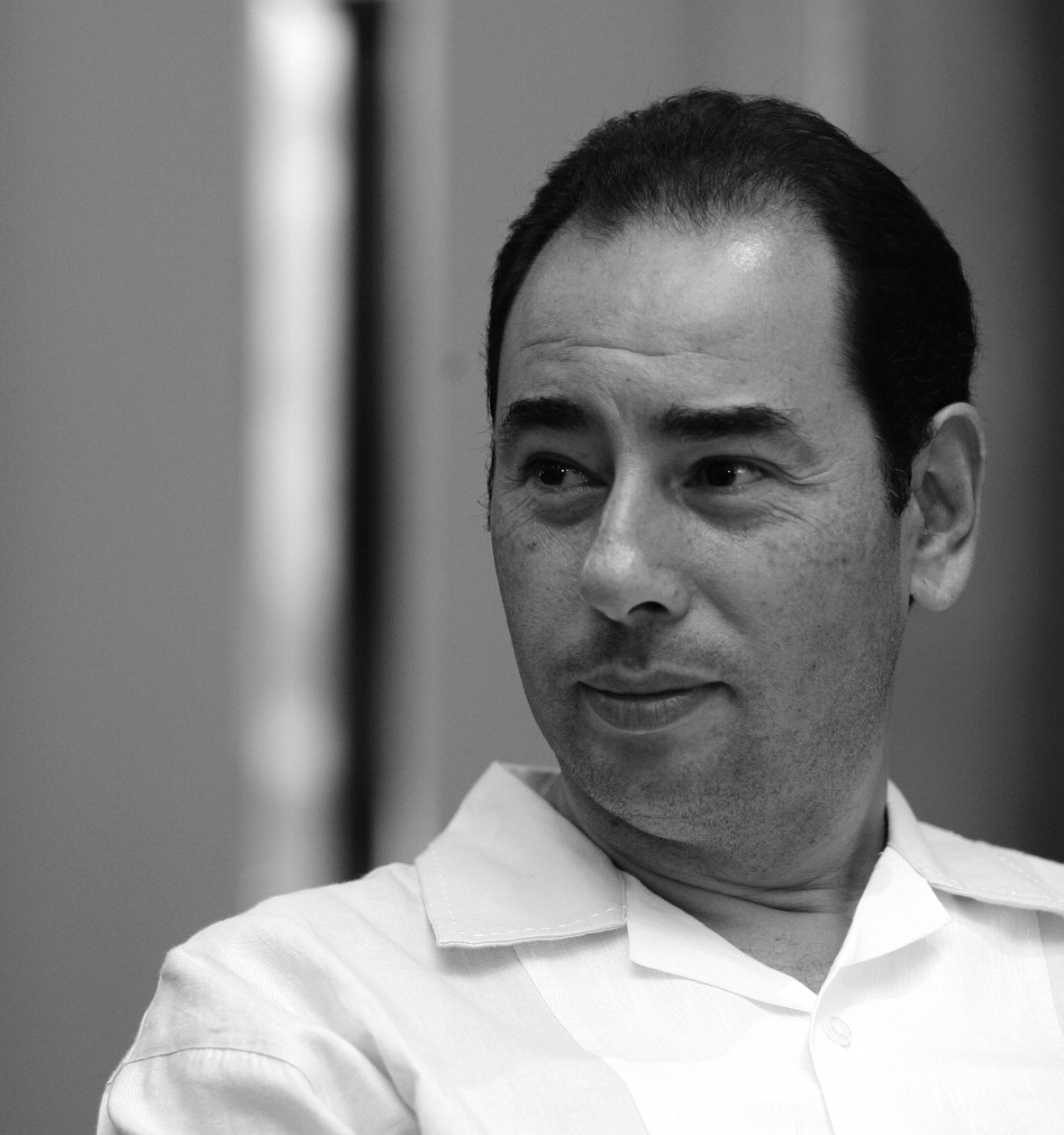
- Born: 27 September 1962 (age 63); Cairo, Egypt
- Education: Political science (BA); International politics (MA)
- Alma mater: Cairo University; Sorbonne University
- Occupation: Novelist
- Writing career
- Notable works: Taxi (2007); Noah's Ark (2009); 2011 (2014); Al Shamandar (2018)

Khaled Al Khamissi (born 27 September 1962) is an Egyptian novelist, columnist and cultural activist.

== Biography ==
Al Khamissi was born to Egyptian actress Faten El Choubachi and poet Abdel Rahman Al Khamissi (Lenin Peace Prize 1979). Upon his mother's death when he was five, Al Khamissi was raised by his maternal grandfather Moufid El Choubachi, also a poet, writer and critic. He grew up in a book-lined home, where politics, literature and art were constantly discussed.

He obtained his bachelor's degree in political science from Cairo University in 1984 and his master's in international politics from the Sorbonne University in 1987.

His three fiction works, Taxi, Noah's Ark and Al Shamandar have provided Arabic and non-Arabic readers with insight into Egyptian society in the last decade. His first non-fiction book 2011 was published in 2014. As a columnist, his articles in Egypt and abroad show a blend of his background as a political analyst and fiction writer.

A believer that cultural progress is the necessary precursor to social change, following the Egyptian revolution of 2011, Al Khamissi set up Doum, a cultural foundation designed to promote critical thinking.

He is founder and president of story telling festival in Qena and founder and president of literary festival in Mansoura.

== Books ==
- Taxi (2007)
- Noah's Ark (2009)
- 2011 (2014)
- Al Shamandar (2018)
