= Culture of Jordan =

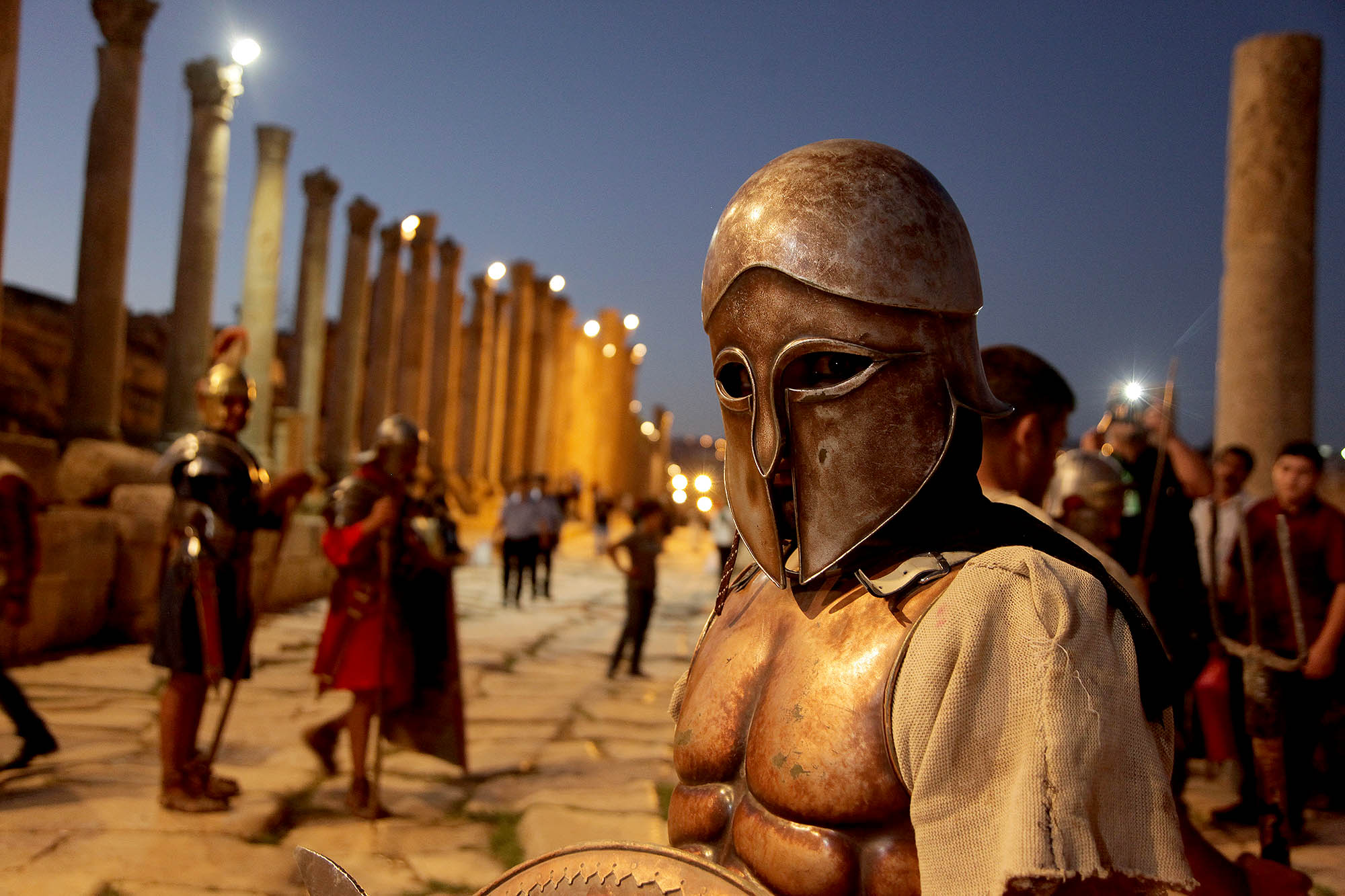
Jerash Festival, 2018

The culture of Jordan is based on Arabic and Islamic elements. Jordan stands at the intersection of the three continents of the ancient world, lending it geographic and population diversity. Notable aspects of the culture include the traditional music and clothing of Jordan and interest in sports. These include football and basketball as well as other sports such as equestrianism, fencing, karate, swimming, and table tennis.

== Popular culture ==
More than 40% of the population lives in the metropolis of Amman, concentrating the culture of Jordan in that city. Clubbing and partying culture are present in Amman, especially in the Western half of the city. Amman is consistently declared as one of the most liberal cities in the region. Malls, global-brand stores, and hotels are important elements in Amman's urban life, especially on the Western side.

English is understood and even spoken in lieu of Jordanian Arabic among Jordanians in the upper class. There's a notable foreign influence on the nation's political life and foreign affairs. In addition, many people from nearby countries have been immigrating to Amman and calling it their new home in the past few years. This increased trade links with the world and has reshaped the culture. The cuisine is shared with surrounding nations such as Egypt, Lebanon, Syria, and Turkey.

Jordanian culture respects women's privacy. Men do not shake hands with women unless the woman offers her hand. Taking photos of women without asking is not allowed. If you take photos of public areas or homes, make sure no women are in the picture without permission.

=== Media ===
Nonprint media has played an important role in Jordanian culture. Television production in particular has thrived due to high-quality acting and creative, interesting storylines that challenge and critique contemporary Arab society. Print media also continues to play a large role in Jordanian culture; the most widely read the Arabic language newspapers include ad-Dustour ("The Constitution") and Al Ra'i ("The Opinion"). Additionally, the country has one daily English-language newspaper, The Jordan Times, and one weekly English-language newspaper, The Star.

=== Music ===
Rural Zajal songs, with improvised poetry played with a Mijwiz, Tablah, Arghul, Oud, Rabab reed pipe and ADdaf ensemble accompanying is popular. Recently Jordan has seen the rise of several prominent DJs and popstars.

=== Cinema ===
Jordan's film industry has cinemas throughout Jordan. Jordanian films include Captain Abu Raed (2007) and Theeb (2014), an international co-production between Jordan, the United Kingdom, the United Arab Emirates and Qatar. Multiple Hollywood films have been filmed on location in Jordan, including Lawrence of Arabia (1962) and Indiana Jones and the Last Crusade (1989). The 2010 Oscar winner for Best Picture, The Hurt Locker, was also filmed in Jordan. More recently, The Martian (2015), Dune: Part One (2021), Aladdin (2019) and parts of Star Wars: The Rise of Skywalker (2019) were filmed in Jordan.

=== Television and episodes ===
The term "musalsalat" may be loosely translated as Arabic soap operas. Jordan produces a number of "Bedouin soap operas" that are filmed outdoors with authentic props. The actors use local Bedouin-accented Arabic to make the story feel more authentic, but have incorporated aspects of the accent of foreign Bedouins in order to make the dialect more broadly understood. These series have become popular in the Levant, Arab states of the Persian Gulf and some parts of Iraq.

Notable series center around traditional village life during the time period just before World War II. Often, these dramas are permeated by themes of tension between the ancient and modern ways of life with specific emphasis on the patriarchal systems and the role of women within them.

Another genre is that of the historical drama. Topics of these shows range from pre-Islamic poets to the Soviet invasion of Afghanistan. Many of these are joint productions by Levantine and Gulf television producers.

While the aforementioned series target a broader, Arabic-speaking audience, certain programs target Jordanians specifically. These shows tend to deal with social and political issues particular to current-day Amman.

=== Dance ===
One of the most popular traditional dances in Jordan is dabke. This may be performed as gender-segregated or co-ed groups. The dancers line up shoulder-to-shoulder, holding hands or placing arms over the neighboring two dancers’ shoulders, then move as a group in a circle using steps that are punctuated by kicks and stomps. The accompanying music includes a flute called a ney, a drum called a tabl, and a reed instrument called a mizmar. This group dance is popular among Bedouins and non-Bedouins alike, and is often performed at weddings.

Jordan has also been affected by an influx of global dance styles within the cultural impact of the last century. These include several ballroom and ballet dance studios in Amman, as well as a regionally recognized and royally supported contemporary dance troupe.

== Literature ==
=== Short stories and novels ===
The modern literary movement in Jordan began in the 20th century during the Al-Nahda cultural renaissance with works of Khalil Beidas, considered the pioneer of the modern Levantine short-story and novel, and Mohammad Subhi Abu Ghanimeh. In the 1930s, Palestinian writer Mahmoud Seif ed-Din al-Irani published his short stories while working for the Jordanian Ministry of Culture, characterized by a "once-upon-a-time resonance and a pronounced folklorishness." The 1950s witnessed a significant change in the intellectual and creative life of Jordan, spurred by political and social upheaval, which resulted in experimentation and variety in Jordanian short stories. In the 1960s, the short story was reconstructed as a distinct art form by writers like Mahmoud Shukair and Jamal Abu Hamdan, who used symbolism, allegory, abstraction, and underlying metaphysical questions posed by modern narrative fiction. Under the direction of Amin Shinnar, the publication The New Horizon played a significant role from 1961-1965 in the experimentation and public awareness of the Jordanian literary movement. Affected by the defeat in the 1967 war with Israel and by internal upheavals, Jordanian stories of the 1970s focused more on the local and personal than in previous decades. Many Jordanian short stories of the 1980s and 90s examined the consequences of regional conflicts, and many were written by women, such as Basma El-Nsour, Magdalene Abu El-Rub, or Manal Hamdi, which marked a new direction for Jordanian literature. Since 2000, Jordanian literature has witnessed a rise in the number of novels that address women's daily struggles with gender discrimination, marking a shift away from literary texts that overtly focus on Palestine.

In 2002, literary magazine Banipal featured contemporary Jordanian writers, including Samiha Khrais, Elias Farkouh, Mohammad Shaheen and many others.

== Archaeology ==
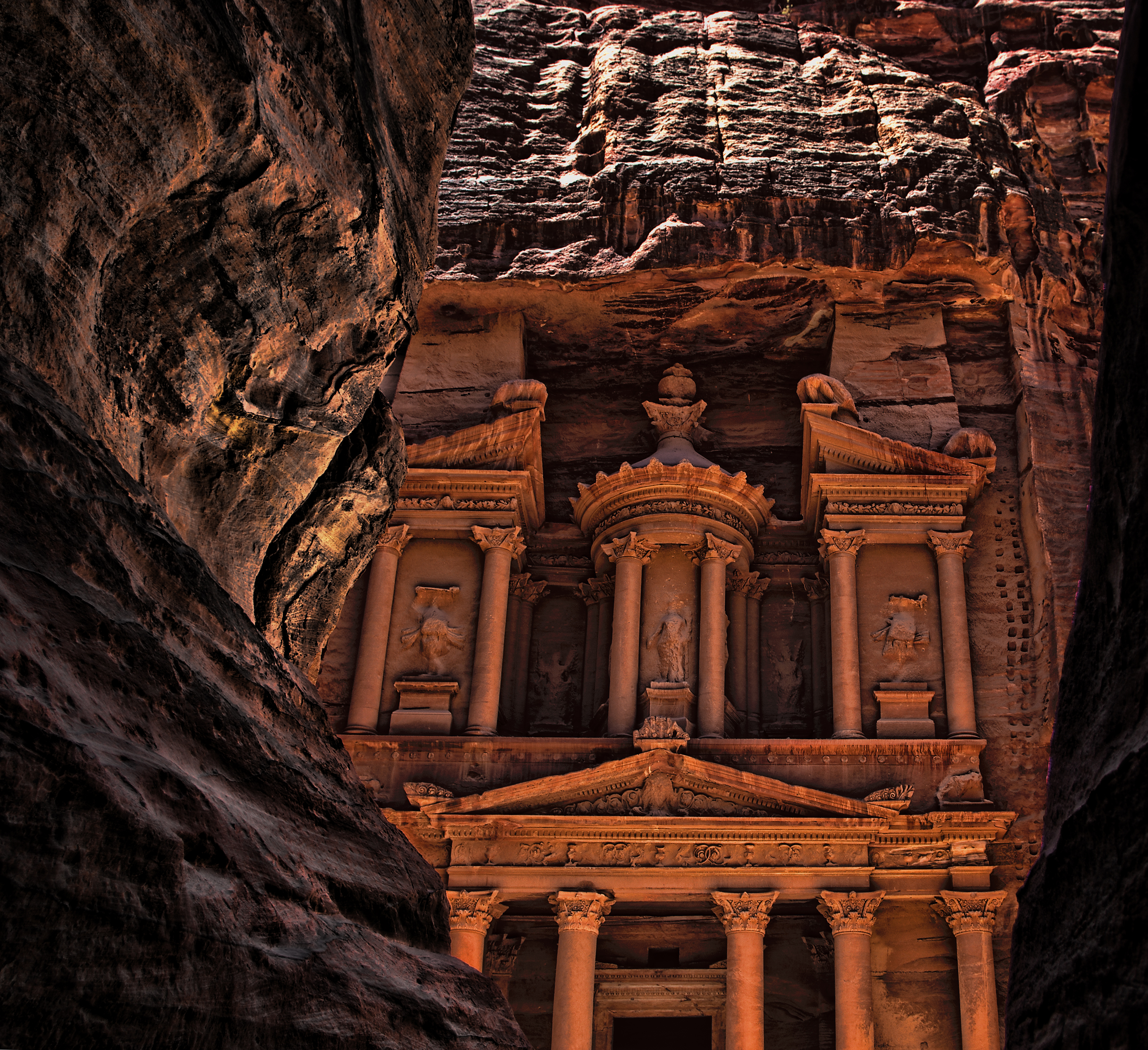
Petra

Archaeological study of Jordan began in the 19th century with the discovery of Petra by Johann Ludwig Burckhardt. Most archaeological attention in the 19th century, however, was focused on Palestine, since foreign archaeologists tended to be preoccupied with the proliferation of Biblical sites located there. The Department of Antiquities in Amman was established in 1923, and since then, there have been excavations in Amman, Pella, Gadara in Um Qais, Petra, Jerash, Kerak, and Aljun. Neolithic statuettes were found in 1983 at the site of prehistoric village Ain Ghazal. Fourth century mosaics have been found in the church at the Monument of Moses at Mount Nebo, and Byzantine mosaics at various churches in Nebo and Madaba. Other mosaics are found throughout the Jordanian desert at various castles dating back to the Umayyad dynasty. Such castles include Qasr al-Hallabat, Hmmam al-Sarakh, Qusayr ‘amra, Qasr Kharana, Mshatta, and Qasr al-Tuba.

The Jordan Archaeological Museum was founded in 1951 in Amman, and archeological museums at Petra, jerash, Madaba, and Kerak have also come into existence. Archeological discoveries in Jordan have also been supported since 1970 by the American Center for Oriental Research (ACOR). ACOR hosts visiting archeologists and anthropologists, funds ongoing discovery initiatives and offers fellowships for students in the region.

== Society and customs ==
=== Hospitality ===
One of the key aspects of Jordanian culture is the hospitality shown by hosts to their guests. This is felt even while walking around the streets of Jordan, where the phrase "ahlan wa sahlan" ("I welcome you") is heard nearly everywhere you go.

Old proverbs such as the following one show that traditions of hospitality date back many years:

"The host must fear the guest. When he sits [and shares your food], he is company. When he stands [and leaves your house], he is a poet" (Lazim al-mu’azzib yikhaf min al-dhayf. Luma yijlis howa dhayf. Luma yigum howa sha’ir).

Some of the traditions of hospitality come from Jordanian Bedouin culture. For example, the host and his/her guest often share a cup of black coffee. The host drinks out of the cup first, ensuring that the coffee is the right temperature. The guest then drinks what remains of the first cup. A second cup is served to the guest, and then a third. The host also serves the guest copious amounts of food and is careful to make sure the guest is comfortable and stays as long as he/she would like. Such displays are referred to as karam, the Arabic word for "generosity" or "hospitality" that also has implications of "nobility," "grace," and "refinement."

In addition to wanting to be hospitable, the host also has a reputation at stake when inviting over a guest.

=== Bedouin weddings ===
Bedouin tradition favors marriage between first cousins on the paternal side of the family. This allows family property to stay within the family. When a man decides he would like to marry, he, his father, and the women of the family discuss who might be an appropriate choice for a wife. Then, a courtship begins. The young man is able to meet with his potential spouse multiple times until they decide whether the marriage will happen. The father of the bride meets with the young man and his father, who seal the agreement over coffee.

Traditional Bedouin wedding celebrations last anywhere from five to seven days. The week begins with small gatherings in the tents of the bride and the groom. These gatherings increase in size throughout the week, adding more guests and food as the days pass. The men gather in the groom's tent where they dance and sing and use pistols and rifles to shoot celebratory shots in the air. The women gather in the bride's tent, and on the final night they paint her hands and feet with henna. On the day of the wedding, the male relatives of the groom dress and prepare him; the women prepare the bride. The bride is dressed in an embroidered wedding dress and gold or silver jewelry, with a green silk cloth covering her head. The female relatives process her to the groom's tent where the wedding takes place. After seven days of marriage, the female relatives of the groom wash and dress the new bride, who is now officially a married woman of the groom's household.

=== Non-Bedouin weddings ===
Traditional weddings among non-Bedouin Jordanians involve a long process that starts with an engagement. Typically, the older women in the family lead the process and talk among one another their children and which among them might make a good match as husband and wife. When an agreement is made between two families, the deal is confirmed over rounds of coffee between the girl's father and the prospective groom and his father. The groom's family then hosts a large engagement party. The two families work together to prepare for the wedding.

Traditional wedding celebrations last a week and begin with small gatherings of family and close friends. As the days pass and the wedding grows closer, the parties increase in size. More guests are invited and more food is served. The night before the wedding, the bride's hands and feet are painted with henna by the women in her family as they sing and tell stories. Traditionally, on the morning of the wedding, the groom's friends take him to a bathhouse for an intense cleaning and a shave, singing and telling jokes all the while, but today this is less common. Once prepared, both the bride and the groom go to the house of the groom's parents. The bride is processed by a caravan of honking cars. The men typically sit outside the house; the women, inside. There is much singing and dancing done by all. Mansaf is typically served as the noonday meal.

Today, especially in cities such as Amman, it is also common for the wedding celebration to be shortened to make the occasion more financially affordable, as well as less time consuming. Many brides opt for bridal outfit white dresses; grooms, a formal black suit. The procession of cars still occurs, but often to a wedding hall rather than the groom's house where guests may or may not sit segregated by gender.

== Sports ==
Football is the most popular sport in Jordan, followed by basketball. The increase of interest in football can be attributed to the recent success of the Jordanian national football team, after they qualified for the AFC Asian Cup for the first time ever in 2004. The Jordanian national basketball team also experienced success after receiving sponsorship by Zain.

== Cuisine ==
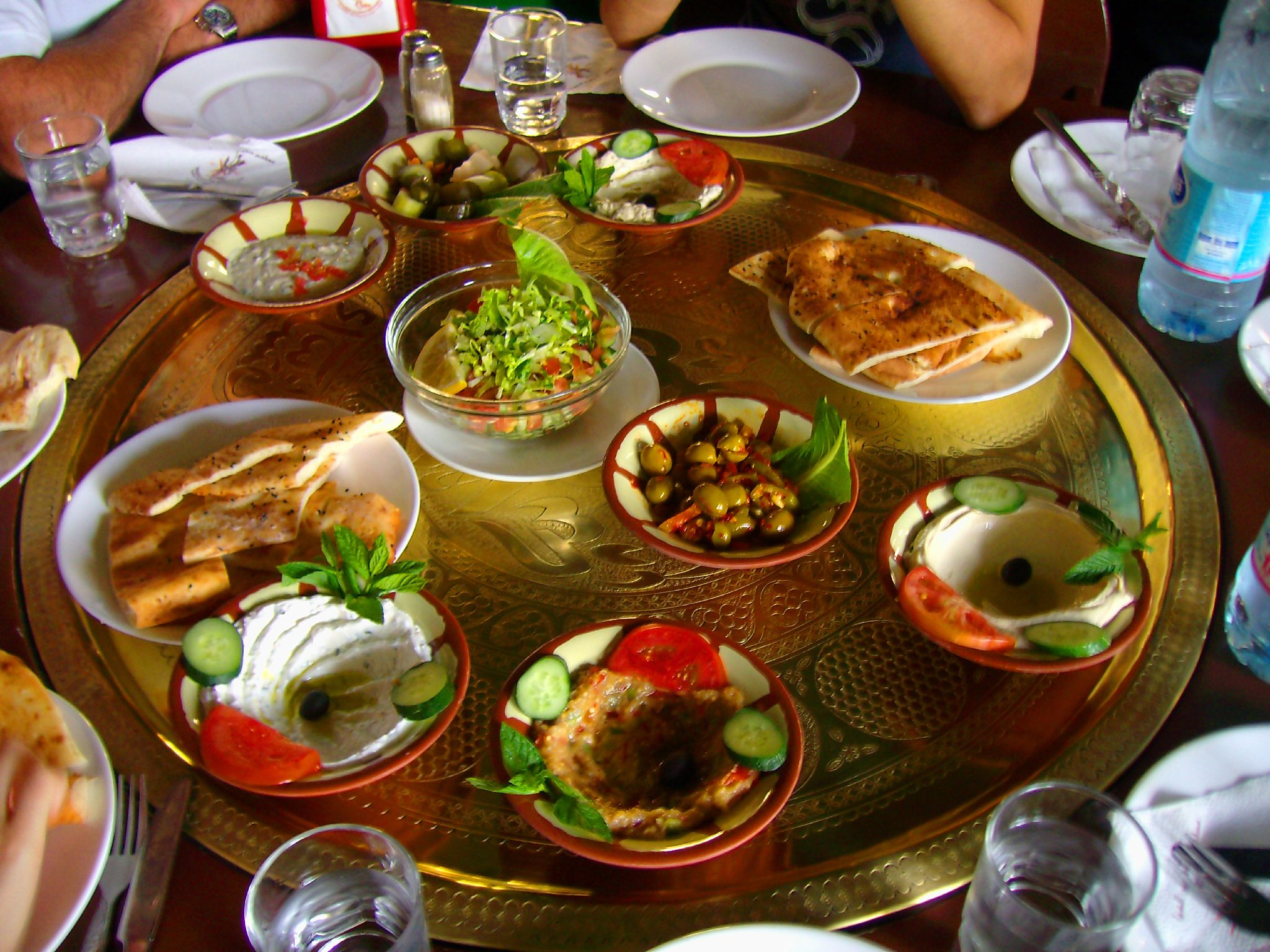
A large plate of Jordanian mezze in Petra

The Jordanian cuisine is a traditional style of food preparation originating from Jordan that has developed from centuries of social and political change with roots starts with the evidence of human activity in Jordan in the Paleolithic period (c. 90,000 BC).

There is a wide variety in the Jordanian style of cooking. The authentic Jordanian cuisine can range from baking, sautéing and grilling to stuffing of vegetables (grape leaves, eggplants, etc.), meat, and poultry. Also common in the Jordanian style of cooking is roasting and preparing foods with special sauces.

As one of the largest producers of olives in the world, olive oil is the main cooking oil in Jordan. Herbs, garlic, spices, onion, tomato sauce and lemon are typical flavours found in Jordanian food. The recipes to the meals of the cuisines of Jordan can vary from extremely spicy to mild.

The most common and popular of the appetizers is hummus, which is a puree of chick peas blended with tahini, lemon, and garlic. Ful Medames is another well-known appetizer. A worker's meal, today it has made its way to the tables of the upper class. A successful mezze must of course have koubba maqliya, labaneh, baba ghanoush, tabbouleh, olives and pickles.

=== Mansaf ===
The national dish in Jordan is mansaf, a dish that is associated with Bedouin traditions. Despite these rural roots, it is shared by Jordanians of many diverse backgrounds, not just Bedouins or those who can trace their ancestral lines back to Bedouins. The dish is composed of a bread called sherack, lamb meat, and yogurt (jameed). Recently, rice and nuts have been added to the dish, and some regions in Jordan add seasoning. It is served on a large, circular platter. The ingredients are combined to form several layers. The first layer is made of thin, unleavened bread, shredded and soaked in yogurt broth. Next is a layer of rice which covers the bread. Large chunks of lamb that have been simmered in the same type of yogurt broth are placed on top of the rice. The head of the lamb is placed in the center of the tray. Pine nuts, almonds, and parsley are sprinkled atop the meat and rice. The final step involves pouring a yogurt broth over the entire dish, which is then added periodically throughout the meal to keep the dish warm and moist. Traditionally, mansaf is eaten while sitting on the floor, using ones hands to eat from a large, circular communal tray. This tradition still persists, although in modern years, many people have taken to eating the dish with silverware. Most admit, however, that mansaf tastes better when eaten with the hand. The dish takes hours to prepare and thus is primarily served only on special occasions.

=== Zarb/Quzi ===
Another famous meat dish in Southern Jordan, especially in the Bedouin desert area of Petra and Wadi Rum, is the Quzi also called as zarb. It is a Bedouin style barbeque containing chunks of meat which have been marinated in spices, as well as bread dough and vegetables which are prepared in a submerged oven called a taboon. It is considered a delicacy of that area.

=== Daily meals ===
Breakfast usually includes a variety of white cheeses, olives, pickled vegetables, and freshly baked breads served with various fruit spreads, butter, or honey. Most opt for tea or fruit juice as a drink with breakfast.

Lunch is the main meal for most Jordanian families, and can take place anywhere from 2 pm until 8 pm. It typically includes a main dish containing meat, as well as rice or bread, as well as a wide variety of salads and dips. Some common salads are tabbouleh and salatah ‘arabiyah (chopped tomatoes, cucumber, and onions, drizzled with olive oil and lemon juice). Dips include baba ghanouj and tahini.

Dinner is generally a smaller meal than lunch, but this can vary family-to-family depending on work schedules. If traditional practice is followed, the meal is usually a type of soup or stew or the leftovers from lunch.

Although simple fresh fruits are often served towards the end of a Jordanian meal, there is also dessert, such as baklava, hareeseh, knafeh, halva and qatayef which is a dessert made specially for Ramadan.

=== Imported culinary customs ===
The large Palestinian population in the country has led to the rise of another popular dish among the people of Jordan: maqluba. This dish is made of meat (typically beef or lamb), fried onions, and a variety of vegetables. The word maqlubah means "upside down" and the dish draws its name from the fact that the pot it is prepared in is turned upside down on a plate before it is served. The dish falls out of the pot with what had been at the bottom of the pot during preparation now sitting on top of the dish.

The Ottoman legacy also lives on in Jordanian cuisine, as evidenced by the presence of such dishes as one called kabsa or Riz Bukhari which is made with chicken, onions, carrots, tomatoes, orange or lemon zest and juice, and spices. This mixture is served on top of rice and sprinkled with raisons and chopped almonds. This dish originates with Turkish-speaking Uzbeks from Central Asia who came to Jordan in the decade after World War I.

== See also ==
- Architecture of Jordan
