= Beirut Nightmares =

1976 novel by Ghada al-Samman

- Author: Ghada Al-Samman
- Language: Arabic
- Genre: Novel
- Publisher: Ghada Al-Samman Publications
- Publication date: 1976
- Publication place: Lebanon
- Pages: 360

Beirut Nightmares (1976) is a novel written by Syrian author Ghada al-Samman. It was translated to several languages, including Russian (1987) and Polish (1984). The novel covers cultural, societal, political, religious, and psychological aspects, in addition to fantasy and magical realism through hallucinations, involving symbolism as a way to explain these aspects. Pauline Vinson explains that Samman's usage of symbolism is not only tied up to socio-political and historical conditions but is also let into the world of fantasy and the surreal, a style close to magic realism.

== Characters ==
- The narrator (the protagonist)
- Yousif (the narrator's deceased boyfriend)
- Shadi (the narrator's brother)
- Amm Fuad and his son, Amin (the narrator's neighbours)
- The pet shop owner
- "Death"

== Main idea ==
The novel is based upon the life of a woman (the narrator) during the Lebanese Civil War trapped in her flat for two weeks due to street battles and snipper fire, writing a series of vignettes formed into diaries. The diaries were split into different sections named "Nightmare" starting from "Nightmare 1" until "Nightmare 197".

She lived with her brother, Shadi, whom one day got arrested for "owning illegal weapons", leaving her with only her neighbours as company: the elderly, Amm Fuad, and his son, Amin.

The narrator digs deep into the layers of stress and anxiety towards hiding from snipers invading her home, along with the trauma resulting from war causing her to barely have the courage to even eat the meat of an animal. She illustrated the psychological aspects of the inner human kind contributing to war, where she'd make metaphors as she contemplated a group of domesticated animals gathered up in a nearby pet shop; she'd observe the way they're locked up, "waiting for their freedom", or the way they'd be hungry searching for food, and "might as well eat one another out of hunger".

In addition, the narrator discussed the concept of war overall, and how she tended to despise "how humankind always refers to war and doesn't emphasise on the importance of peace"; the war that led to killing people from different religious views, including her boyfriend, Yousif. She'd wanted to fight this idea of war and the significance of bringing peace along instead of causing conflicts between people from different religious views. Furthermore, she'd consider herself as a "fighter with a pen and paper" and not a "fighter with a sword" in light of protesting against conducting war.

Also, she tended to reflect upon the writer's and intellectual's helplessness towards violence, where the only thing they have is a pen and paper, yet she eventually came upon writing thoughts that became "Beirut Nightmares".

The narrator also pointed out how the media used to cover news. She would see that snipers were surrounding houses and street battles were happening all day long, yet the radio presenter would only talk about the weather or "how blessed the country is today", which she considered as "biased and untruthful".

Moreover, nightmares throughout the novel included hallucinations, fairy-tale like, apart from actual nightmares or realities nightmarish in nature, for example, the little boy who escapes to Australia to make a fortune for his family. Along the way, he encounters Death, eager to tell his stories to anyone who will listen, and Death eventually lulls the boy into a never-ending sleep.

At the end of the novel, the narrator is in a new place, but she loses everything. A sniper shoots the ghost of Yousif, and she loses her library in which she always stuck beside, as her refugee, during the shootings; she felt that she was at "point zero", yet this point zero to her "was the beginning, and the largest number in her life".

== Quotes ==
"I gift this novel to the printers, who are currently organising the letters despite the bombings, and they know that the book will not have their name written inside. "To the anonymous fighters, the heroes, who live and die in silence, creating history. To the ones writing these books which wouldn't have their signatures inside; to them I gift these lines, to the ones who lighted their waxy fingers for the dawn to rise"

"After eight months of civil war, you become conscious of how the frightful chaos around you has taken possession of your inner being, and you feel the need to reorder the world inside you, including your values and your ways of understanding things. Everything looks different in the light of the surprises that have come your way, and the discoveries which, whether they've come as painful blows or sources of intense joy, have in either case left you both baffled and astounded"

== See also ==
Ghada al-Samman

Beirut 75
