= Chakdouf =

Municipality in Akkar Governorate, Lebanon

Chakdouf الشقدوف
- Municipality
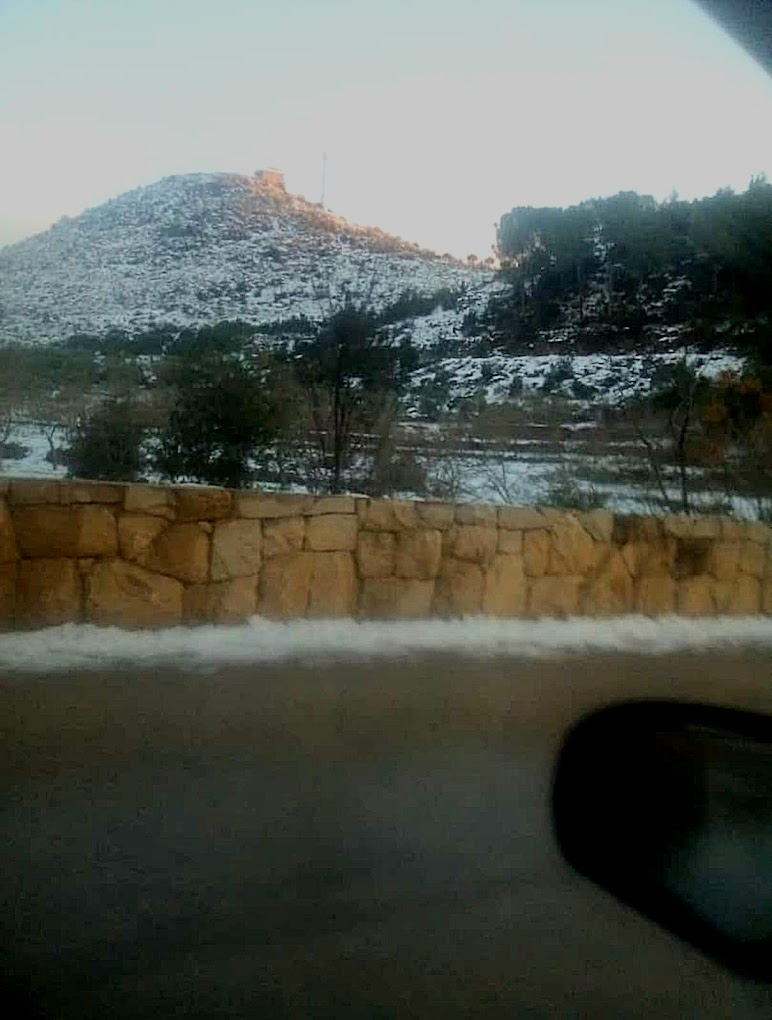
- Image of Helena Mountain in Akkar in Lebanon

- Location within Lebanon
- Coordinates: 34.5275923°N 36.1891479°E
- Country: Lebanon
- Governorate: Akkar Governorate
- District: Akkar District
- Elevation: 600 m (2,000 ft)
- Time zone: UTC+2 (EET)
  - Summer (DST): UTC+3 (EEST)
- Dialing code: +06

Chakdouf (Arabic: الشقدوف, romanized: ash-Shaqdūf, also romanized Chaqdouf) is a municipality in the district of Akkar, Lebanon. The town of Helena Mountain in Lebanon.In 2021, solar panels and solar water heating systems were installed in Chaqdouf and Akkar al-Atika.

Helena Mountain

As in History Book. Helena ( was on Arianism "Monotheism" ) Mother of Constantine the Mountain was named on her name. The mountain is located in a strategic point in Al Joumeh between Aaiyat, Ain Yakoub, Al Burj and it oversees Beino Village.
