= I Turn On the Dust and Walk =

Lebanese novel

- Author: May Mansi
- Language: Arabic
- Subjects: History, Lebanese Civil War
- Genre: Literary fiction, biography
- Published: 2006
- Publisher: Riyad Al Rayes Publishing
- Pages: 255

I Turn On the Dust and Walk (Antaʿilul Ghubaru Wa 'Amshi) is the fifth novel by the Lebanese novelist, journalist, and critic May Mansi. The novel was first published in 2006 by Riyad Al Rayes Publishing. Parts of the novel were translated into English, and it was shortlisted for the International Prize for Arabic Fiction – also known as the “Poker” - in 2008.

== About the novel ==
I Turn On the Dust and Walk (Antaʿilul Ghubaru Wa 'Amshi) is an autobiographical novel, narrated in first-person in short parts without titles. The story includes a miserable childhood filled with poverty, migration, and bodily disability. This childhood is contrasted by an early nobility, curiosity, persistence, and resistance. The novel is narrated with boldness, emotions, humanity, and raw language.

=== Title ===
May Mansi says that I Turn On The Dust and Walk (Antaʿilul Ghubaru Wa 'Amshi) describes the massacre that happened in one of the villages in Lebanon, killing men, women, and children. Her friend – who is a priest – collected the homeless children after the massacre and took them to France to get their education. The novel is inspired by the story of one of the boys she met at the priest's, and she found that his face was chipped, so she asked him “what happened to your face, Eli?” to which he replied, “when the terrorists came to kill us, our mother slept on top of us; she died, and I lived and took the shrapnels with me.” His sister hid behind the curtains, and she lost her speech abilities. Later, Eli finds his way back to Lebanon and joins the resistance, whereas the girl, Maria Noor, falls in love with writing and studies journalism as a mute person. She prefers working in hot countries, and the newspapers where she worked used to say that her muteness makes her disabled; therefore, she should go to hot areas. She says that they want her to go there because she is useless, for she is an orphan. She escaped the massacre in her homeland as a disabled, and if I die, who's going to mourn her. She ran away with the people during the shelling and bobbing in Iraq. She loses her shoes whilst running between water, and she didn't turn back to get her shoes. She says “I will turn on the dust and talk,” and that's where the title of the novel comes from.

== Translation ==
Parts of the novel were published into English in 2008, and they were published in the Banipal London Magazine, specializing in modern Arabic literature. It was translated by the American translator “Paula Haidar.”
