= Things I Left Behind =

2020 novel by Shada Mustafa

- Author: Shada Mustafa
- Language: Arabic and English
- Publisher: Naufal (Arabic); Banipal (English)
- Publication date: 2020
- Pages: 120

Things I Left Behind (Arabic: شدة مصطفى) is a 2020 novel by Palestinian writer Shada Mustafa. It was shortlisted for the Sheikh Zayed Book Award for Literature 2021, Young Author category.

== Publication ==
Things I Left Behind was originally published in Arabic by Naufal in 2020 and subsequently in English by Banipal. The book was translated into English by Nancy Roberts.

It was written by Palestinian author Shada Mustafa. The book is fictional, although the author described it as a fictional autobiography.

== Synopsis ==
Things I Left Behind is about two Palestinian sisters with divorced parents. One sister falls in love with a man in Sweden. The book it set in 2000, and includes themes of Israeli occupation, women's rights, sexuality and family values.

== Critical reception ==
It was shortlisted for the Sheikh Zayed Book Award for Literature 2021, Young Author category.

== Editions ==
1. Ma Taraktu Khalfi/شدة مصطفى, Naufal (Beirut), ISBN 9786144695432
2. Things I Left Behind (English translation by Nancy Roberts), Banipal Book (UK), ISBN 9781913043261
