= Shada Mustafa =

Palestinian novelist

- Born: 1995; Palestine
- Education: American University of Beirut; Free University of Berlin
- Occupation: Writer
- Writing career
- Notable work: ما تركت خلفي (English: Things I left behind)

Shada Mustafa (شذى مصطفى) is a Palestinian novelist, best known for her novel ما تركت خلفي (English:Things I Left Behind) which was shortlisted for the Sheikh Zayed Book Award for Literature 2021, Young Author category.

== Early life and education ==
Mustafa was born in Palestine, studied architecture in Lebanon at the American University of Beirut before moving to Germany. She also has a master's degree in Human Geography from the Free University of Berlin. She took part in the Lund School of Architecture Spring Exhibition of 2017.

== Career ==
Her first novel ما تركت خلفي (English: Things I Left Behind) was published by Hachette Antoine in Arabic and by Banipal in English (ISBN 9781913043261), in 2020. The book is fictional, although she described it as a fictional autobiography, and is about two Palestinian sisters with divorced parents. One sister falls in love with a man in Sweden. The book it set in 2000, and includes themes of Israeli occupation, family dynamics, and women's liberation. The book was translated into English by Nancy Roberts.

== Selected publications ==
- Shada Mustafa, ما تركت خلفي (English: Things I Left Behind), 2022, published by Hachette Antoine and Banipal
- Lama Altakruri, Shayma Nader, Adele Jarrar, Shada Mustafa, Qusai Al Saify, Hiba Isleem, Jamila Ewais, and Fakhry Al-Serdawi, Reworlding Ramallah: A collection of Palestinian Science-Fiction Short Stories, Onomatopee (Germany) & Dar Laila Publishing (Palestine), 2019
