= Praise for the Women of the Family =

2015 novel by Mahmoud Shukair

- Author: Mahmoud Shukair
- Language: Arabic
- Publication date: 2015

Praise for the Women of the Family is a novel by Palestinian novelist Mahmoud Shukair. The novel was first published in 2015 by Hachette Antoine House in Beirut. It was entered into the "short" shortlist of the 2016 International Prize for Arabic Fiction, known as the "Arab Booker Prize".

== About the novel ==
In this novel, the Palestinian writer Mahmoud Shukair narrates the story of the women of the "Abdul Lat" clan, who did not remain silent about the behavior of "Rasmiya" who wore short underwear and accompanied her husband to an evening, just as they did not remain silent about Najma, who took off the long dress and put on the dress after Leaving Ras al-Nabaa and residing in the city. “Sana” also, a bank employee, had her share of bitterness after the sea came down and the sun swept the whites of her legs. All this and Wadha, the sixth wife of Mannan, the chief of the clan, is still obsessed with the ghost-haunted washing machine and television. These are the women of Al-Abd Al-Lat. Through them, and in honor of them, "Muhammad bin Manan" writes the history of the clan that migrated before from its desert and is preparing today to abandon its nomadism. It is the era of political and social transformations after the Nakba, the boom of modernity, and the seeds of conflict that began to grow in Palestine in the 1950s.
