= Ghada al-Samman =

Syrian writer, journalist and novelist (born 1942)

Ghadah Al-Samman
- Native name: غادة السمّان
- Born: 1942 (age 83–84) Damascus, Syria
- Occupation: Novelist, journalist
- Language: Arabic, English, French
- Notable works: No Sea in Beirut; The Departure of Old Ports; Beirut Nightmares

Ghadah Al-Samman (Arabic: غادة السمّان; born 1942) is a Syrian writer, journalist and novelist born in Damascus in 1942 to a prominent and conservative Damascene family. Her father was Ahmed Al-Samman, a president of the University of Damascus. She is distantly related to poet Nizar Qabbani, and was deeply influenced by him after her mother died at a very young age.

== Career ==
Her father’s appreciation for both Western and Arabic literature deeply influenced her, imbuing her with a unique style that blends elements of both traditions. Raised in the conservative society of Damascus, she encountered challenges that shaped her literary voice. She published her first book of short stories,Your Eyes Are My Destiny (Arabic: عيناك قدري), in 1962, which was moderately successful. Initially, she was categorized alongside traditional feminine writers. However, her subsequent works transcended the confines of romantic and feminine literature, venturing into broader social, feminist, and philosophical themes.

She earned a Bachelor of Arts in English literature from the Syrian University in 1963 and subsequently moved to Beirut to pursue a master’s degree in theatre at the American University of Beirut. After completing her studies, she chose not to return to Damascus. While in Beirut, she worked as a journalist and published her second collection of stories, No Sea in Beirut (Arabic: لا بحر في بيروت) in 1965, reflecting her broadened horizons and experiences. She later traveled across Europe, working as a correspondent. In 1966, she released her third collection of stories, Foreigners’ Nights (Arabic: ليل الغرباء).

The Six-Day War profoundly impacted her, as it did many of her contemporaries. This influence was apparent in her notable article, "I Carry My Shame to London" (Arabic: احمل عاري إلى لندن). Following this, she did not publish any books for six years, focusing instead on journalism. Her articles during this period, which more closely reflected social realities, increased her popularity. They also served as the foundation for some of her later works. In 1969, she joined Salim Lawzi’s weekly news magazine, Al Hawadeth, as a correspondent.

In 1973 she published her fourth collection, The Departure of Old Ports (Arabic: رحيل المرافئ القديمة), considered by some critics as one of her most significant works. This collection of short stories explores the challenges faced by Arab intellectuals, highlighting the discrepancy between their thoughts and actions. She published her first novel, Beirut 75 (Arabic: بيروت 75), towards the end of 1974. This novel delves into the complex social issues of Beirut and presciently anticipated the turmoil that erupted a few months later with the onset of the Lebanese Civil War.

Following the publication of two more novels, Beirut Nightmares (Arabic: كوابيس بيروت) in 1977, which portrays life in Beirut during the mid-Seventies amidst the civil war, and The Eve of Billion (Arabic: ليلة المليار) in 1986, she began to be recognized by some critics as the most prominent modern Arab writer. In Farewell Damascus, translated by Nancy Roberts and published in English in 2017, she presented a literary account of life in the Syrian capital in the 1960s and of gender-specific experiences of Syrian women as herself. In her review for Banipal magazine, editor Margaret Obank wrote: "The central theme of the novel [...] is the traditionally unequal, macho, chauvinist and abusive treatment of women by most men, the pressures put on girls to leave school, marry early and have kids, and basically give up on any chance of life apart from that of being a servant to the needs of their future husband."

== Personal life ==
In the late 1960s al-Samman married Bashir Al Daouq, the owner of Dar Al Tali’a publishing house and had her only son, Hazim, which she named after one of her heroes in Foreigners' Nights. She later started her own publishing house and re-published most of her books. Further, she edited all her articles in a series she called “The Unfinished Works” (Arabic: الأعمال غير الكاملة). She has published fifteen books, nine of them are poetry collections. She has stored her unpublished works including many letters in a Swiss bank, which she promises to publish “when the time is right”.

In 1993 she caused a scene in the literary and political arenas when she published a collection of love letters written to her by Ghassan Kanafani in the sixties when she had a love affair with him, which was no secret at the time. She was condemned for publishing them by some claiming that her intention was to smear the late writer's reputation and/or to negatively affect the Palestinian Cause. Al-Samman has also written a few books of literary criticism, and translated some of her works to other languages. She has lived in Paris since the mid-1980s and regularly writes in an Arabic magazine published in London.

Al-Samman's mother died when she was young, so she was raised by her father for most of her life. When she was an adult, Samman's father died and she lost her job in a short period of time. People in her society had a traditional frame of mind and saw her as a “fallen woman”.

== Selected works ==
=== Short stories ===
- Arabic: عيناك قدري, romanized: Ayunak Qidray, lit. 'Your Eyes are my Destiny', 1962
- Arabic: لا بحر في بيروت, romanized: La Bahr Fi Bayrut, lit. 'No Sea in Beirut', 1965
- Arabic: ليل الغرباء, romanized: Layal Al Ghuraba, lit. 'Foreigners’ Nights', 1966
- Arabic: رحيل المرافئ القديمة, romanized: Rahil Al Murafa' Al Qadima, lit. 'The Departure of Old Ports', 1973
- Arabic: القمر المربع: قصص غرائبية, romanized: Al Qamar Al Murabah: Qisas Al Gharibiyah, lit. 'The Square Moon: Supernatural tales', Fayetteville Ark: University of Arkansas Press. 1994

=== Poetry ===
- حب (Hubb), “Love”, 1973.
- أعلنت عليك الحب ('Alanat 'Alayk Hubb), “I Declare Love Upon You”, 1976.

=== Novels ===
- اعتقال لحظة هاربة~I'tikal Lahzah Haribah (Capturing Freedom's Cry), 1979. Translated into English by Rim Zahra and Razzan Zahra as Capturing Freedom's Cry: Arab Women Unveil Their Heart, 2019.
- Farewell Damascus. Translated by Nancy Roberts, Darf Publishers, UK, 2017, ISBN 978-1-85077-295-8
- الأبديه لحظة حب~ Al-Abadiyya Lahzat al-Hubb (Eternity is a Moment of Love), 1999. Translated by Rim Zahra as Arab Women in Love and War: Fleeting Eternities, 2009.
- ليلة المليار (Laylat Al Miliyar), 1986. The Night of the First Billion, translated by Nancy N Roberts. Syracuse N.Y: Syracuse University Press, 2005.
- سهرة تنكرية للموتى (Sahra Tanakuriyah Al Mawta), A Costume Party for the Dead, 2003.
- كوابيس بيروت (Kawabis Bayrut), Beirut Nightmares, 1977.
- بيروت 75 (Bayrut 75), “Beirut 75”,1974.

=== Autobiography ===
- الرواية المستحيلة: فسيفسا ءدمشقية (Al Ruayah Al Mustahilah: Fasifasa' Dimashqiya), The Impossible Novel: Damascene Mosaic, 1997.

== See also ==
- Syrian literature

== Sources ==
- Translated from the Arabic Wikipedia.
- Non official website of the writer al-Samman al-Samman
