= Beirut 75 =

1975 novel by Ghada al-Samman

- Author: Ghada Al-Samman
- Language: Arabic
- Genre: Novel
- Publisher: Ghada Al-Samman Publications
- Publication date: 1975
- Publication place: Lebanon
- Pages: 112

Beirut 75 (1975) is the first full-length novel written by Syrian author, Ghada Al-Samman. It is about what is theorised to be the social and political causes of the Lebanese Civil War in 1975.

== Characters ==
- Farah: Damascene. Depressed; a victim of hallucinations and nightmares. His goal in Beirut was to find his relative, Neshan, whom his father wanted Farah to give a letter of will written for him. He goes to him to ask for fame and wealth, as his father wanted.
- Yasmina: Comes from Damascus. Overwhelmed by her life as a teacher at a convent, Yasmina felt highly passionate to head to Beirut; "the city of freedom, love, and success", as she'd call it. She is "obsessed with falling in love, nature, and getting out of her comfort zone".
- Abu Al Mulla: He was the third passenger; he was constantly sighing and complaining because he wanted to get his daughters back from a palace, he put them in. He was a religious and a poor man. His poverty causes him to steal at some point.
- Ta’an: Fourth passenger; panicky, traumatised from his tribe who wanted him killed because of his university diploma.
- Abu Mustafa: Final Passenger; he is a fisher, and only has three fingers due to an incident of fishing using dynamites. He eventually dies because of the same dynamites, previously victim of an existential nightmare that made him see a genie with a light lamp.

All characters were victims of existential nightmares leading to "fatalness and insanity".

== Main Idea & Plot ==
The novel begins with five people heading to Beirut riding the same vehicle. Everyone was silent, having internal conversations among themselves. From depression, suffocation, and fear, each of them was eager to solving their own concerns, while observing the rest in curiosity. They all had different goals; fame, wealth, freedom, security, dignity, and recognition, hoping they’d achieve it in Beirut.

It was their dream to go there. Farah wanted fame and wealth; Yasmina wanted love, freedom, and a lively life, also wealth. Abu Mustafa wanted to continue his career and for his son, Mustafa, to join him. However, the city turns out to be a "prison"; exposing some of its "darkest sides, from Israeli air raids triggering memories, to encountering wounded people, racism, and sexual exploitation". Cultural, societal, and political aspects are "exposed" putting each character in a position of "self-reflection and protesting".

=== Cultural and Political Aspects ===
Yasmina desiring freedom in her love life, realises that the liveliness she desires within the oceans, skies, and trees, fades away when her boyfriend, Nemer, is used by his father as a partisan for the right-wing militia, the moment his father set a marriage for convenience with a daughter of a wealthy ally, changing Yasmina's views as a "free woman" from the "perspective of Beirut’s society".

Mustafa, on one hand, hated the career of fishing; he did not want to become like his father because he considered that "killing fish is similar to killing humanity", and because he loves reading and writing poetry. While Abu Mustafa tended to be upset, he did not scold Mustafa much about this, despite thinking that it did make him crazy. Because it "hit Abu Mustafa that this craziness is inherited from a man who owns a secret genie lamp", speaking of himself, as he has "always wanted to meet with the genie before he dies".

=== The Aspects of Racism and Exploitation ===
The Damascene, Farah, was a depraved victim to the Western-style idolatry of Beirut's "elite", Neshan; constantly pushing him to be on the spotlight under the conditions of "becoming rich and famous". At the beginning, Farah would remember how his father would always scold him, feeling "disgusted towards the piles of books Farah owned, and thinking of him as a rebel", as he wanted him to be like Neshan, their relative.

=== The Aspect of Israeli Air-Raids and the Connection with Socio-political Aspects ===
While Yasmina and Farah were discovering Beirut, Israeli air raids were observed across the sky. Yasmina was in a yacht with her boyfriend, Nemer, causing her to panic; yet Nemer, didn't seem to care. Farah was in the middle of the streets paranoid from the same air raids, which tended to trigger his memories back in Damascus. But same condition; everyone tended to move on with their life. The author's aim here was to depict how the region "did not tend to do much about Israeli air raids overwhelming people" hence criticising them about it.

=== The Aspects of Injustice and Poverty ===
The three other passengers, Abu Mustafa, Abu Al Mulla, and Ta’an were pictured as the ones who were not able to "escape poverty" due to their perceived victimisation of a feudal tribal society that "condemns for no reason". "Surrendering to existential nightmare conditions", it led Ta’an to the insanity of accidentally killing a tourist, while Abu Al Mulla and Abu Mustafa went fatal.

=== Existential Nightmare Conditions In-Depth ===
Abu Al Mulla wanted to steal a statue to give to someone who was going to pay him 10,000 lira; the decision that was made after he thought of ways to get his daughters back from a palace they worked as maids in. Stealing was overwhelming for him because it was the "first time to commit such an act while he is extremely religious", and he was "betraying his friend", speaking of the statue, whom he developed a relationship with and even tended to speak to most of the time, making people think of him as crazy.

Later on, when he was on bed with the statue next to him waiting for the man to come, Abu Al Mulla was scared from the statue's looks, sensing anger and fiery light. This was due to his existential nightmares, making him think that the statue was really his friend who felt betrayed.

Then suddenly, he saw the statue's fingers crawling around his neck, chocking him to death. His family came in later, and saw Abu Al Mulla dead with what the children considered as "a small puppet made out of rocks", and Al Mulla said that his "father died from clot", which meant that the statue wasn't really of something big after all; it was due to these nightmares.

=== Ending ===
Honour crimes providing fatal for Yasmina, and insanity overwhelming Farah, Beirut was to undergo a name change in the last section of the novel named "Nightmare" that featured Farah. He stole the asylum’s banner, running away from there after being "kept in for a while" (nightmares), and he went to Beirut's entrance, threw away its banner, and replaced it with "Lunatic Asylum" laughing out loud at what the place "really is after all" due to all these cultural, political, psychological, and societal "shocking" aspects that caused suffering because what they wanted was to "be recognised and feel free".

== Quotes ==
- "All ye who enter here, abandon all hope!"
- "Beirut has ruined me, that’s all!"
- "That’s not true," he replied, "You women all accuse Beirut of ruining you when the truth of the matter is that the seeds of corruption were already deep inside you. All Beirut did was to give them a place to thrive and become visible. It’s given them a climate where they can grow."
- "She wondered to herself...– if they had allowed my body to experience wholesome, sound relationships in Damascus – would I have lost my way to this extent?

== Reviews ==
Subject-wise, Kim Jensen said that the aspects discussed by Al-Samman are marked by their dramatic passion and their ability to create a net of recurrent symbols which are cast and re-cast to show the inter-relatedness of the five characters.

And while the novel theorises the possible social and political causes of the Lebanese Civil War in 1975, George Nicolas Hage argues that the representation of Beirut as a whole through the symbolisation of characters tends to be lacking because the city is stripped out of all its positive qualities, such as being the cultural capital of the Middle East and its intellectual literacy center, in addition to the fact that characters speaking in French are ridiculed, while it's the first language that the author learned.

== See also ==
Ghada al-Samman

Beirut Nightmares
