= Architecture of Jordan =

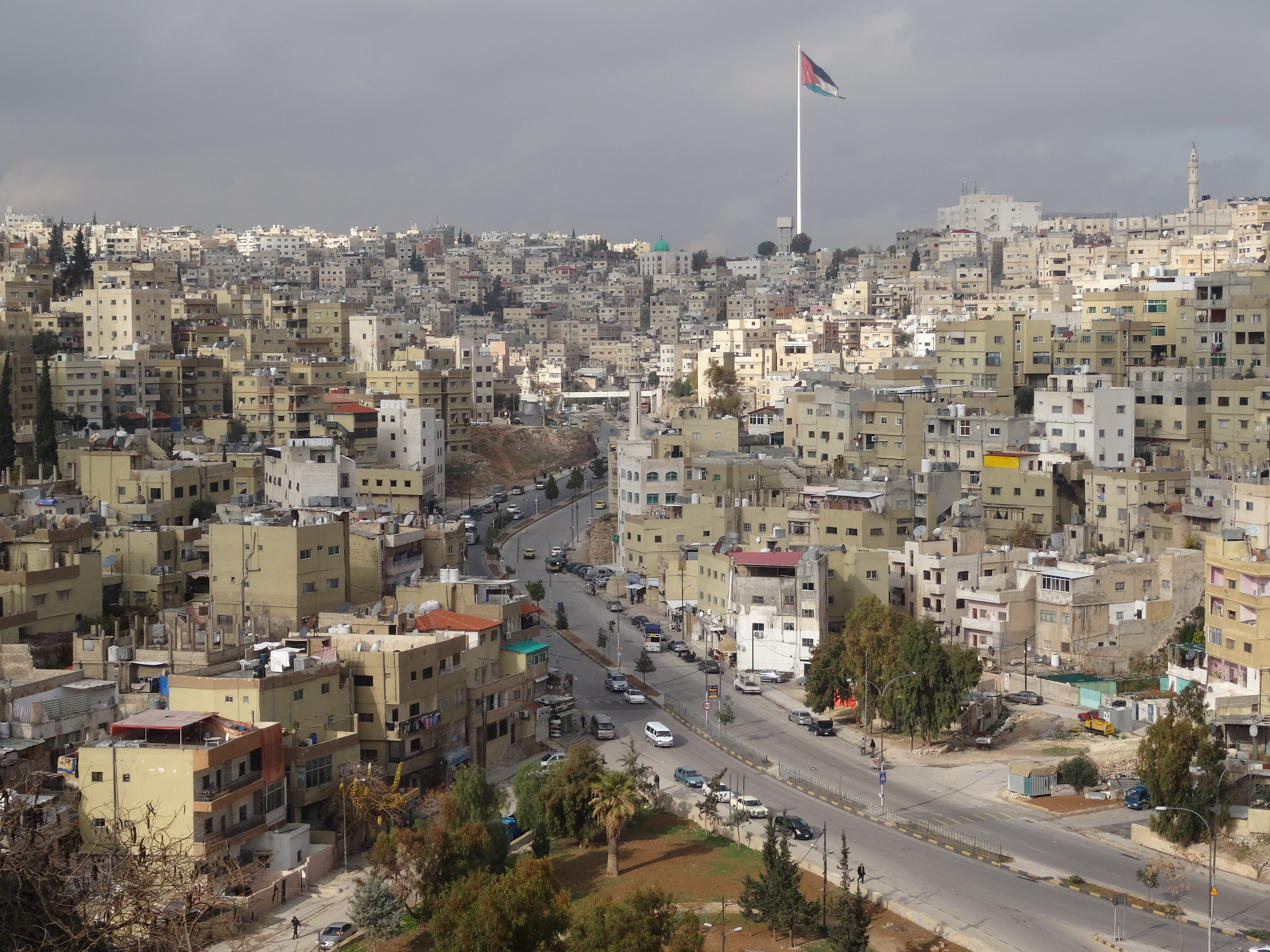
Amman city centre (Capital of Jordan)

The architecture of Jordan has been subject to vast development, specifically in the final years of the twentieth century. Jordan is a semi-arid country located in the Middle East. Its location has great significance to Christians, Muslims and Jews as it is considered part of the Holy Land.

The traditional architecture in Jordan can be attributed to many factors, which have played a pivotal role in shaping Jordanian culture. These factors include the different groups of people who have lived in the land, the mostly arid desert climate and the terrain, which is dominated by the Jordan River Valley, the Dead Sea, and the Jordanian Highlands. As a result of increased urbanisation and an open approach to global architectural trends, Jordanian architecture began to neutralise the traditional forms of architecture that dominated the region.

== Historical background ==
Evidence of inhabitancy in Jordan can be dated back to the Palaeolithic period. The diversity of style of Jordanian architecture such as temples, castles and mosques can be credited to the wide-ranging cultures that have resided in the land. They include the three kingdoms; Edom, Moab and Ammon, as well as the Roman Empire, Nabataea Kingdom and the Ottoman Empire. As there were no qualified Jordanian architects in this time period, the buildings were constructed by local builders or Arabs from neighbouring countries such as Syria and Palestine.

== Architecture of Petra ==
The architecture of Petra is the most recognisable from Jordan due to its popularity among tourists. Petra was a city that was at the centre of trade between the Middle East and the Roman Empire. It was a city of ingenuity and wealth. The original settlements in Petra were constructed of rough stones and clay. The designs were simple and were likely used for travellers to store items. Once the population in Petra began to grow, the infrastructure such as tombs and monuments incorporated the designs of their trading partners. Their architectural style was Nabataean, incorporating the influences of Assyrian, Egyptian, Greek and Roman civilisations. The rock-cut facades are the most iconic monuments in Petra.

Workers used four main stone working tools when constructing the monuments. A pick-axe, a pointed chisel to smooth over rough cuts, a toothed chisel to create the parallel lines and a flat chisel for smoothing and dressing the cut stone. Plaster was often used when mistakes were made on the rock face to glue new pieces of rock. The mason would cut the mistake from the monument and replace it.

=== The Treasury ===
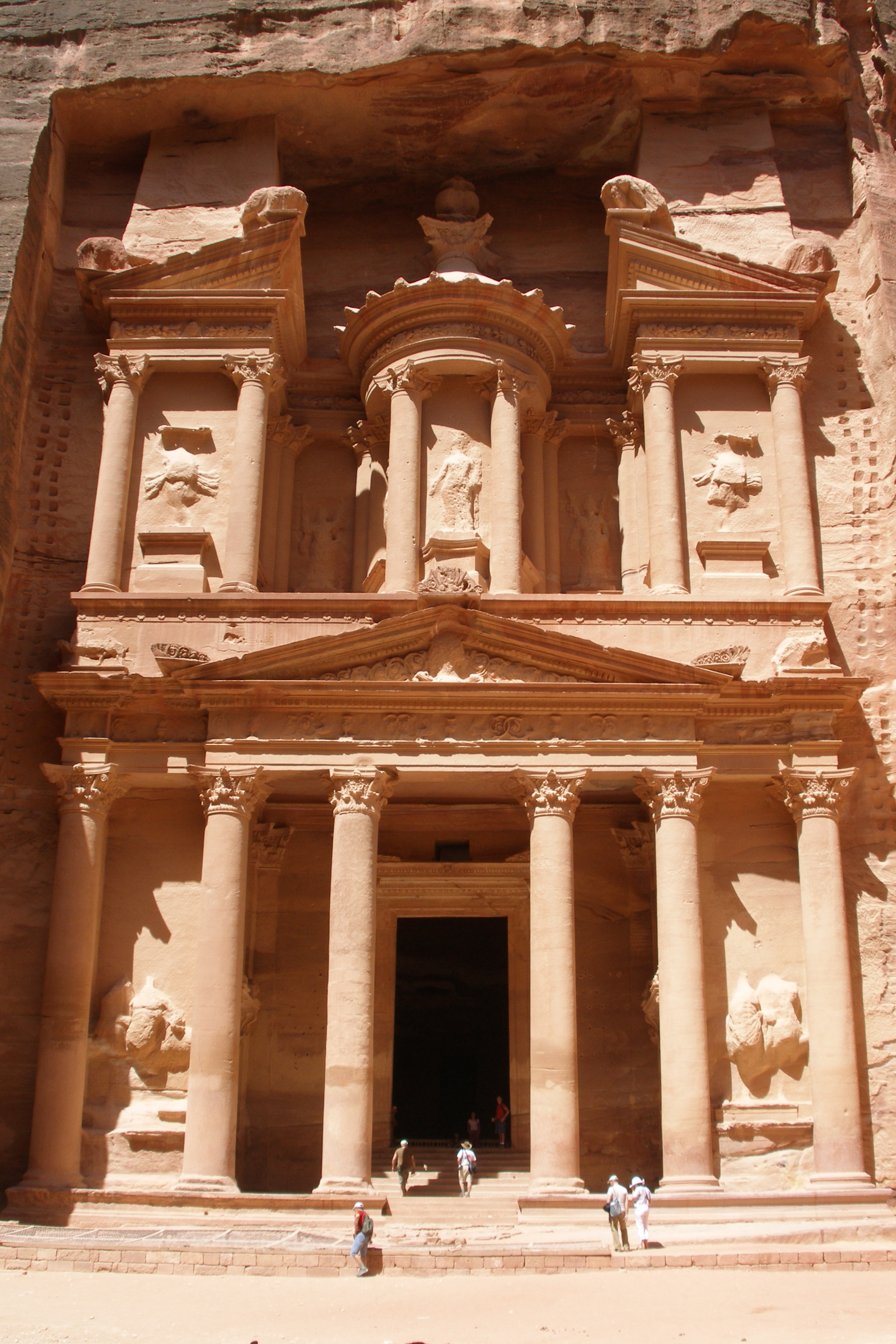
The Treasury or Al-Khazneh

The Treasury or Al-Khazneh is a monument carved out of the sandstone rock face in Petra. It was carved during the reign of the Nabataean King Aretas IV Philopatris at the start of the 1st century AD. It stands at 80 feet wide and 127 feet tall.

Using only iron chisels and hammers, it was constructed from top down. On the upper level, the rock face is decorated with Amazons and Victories, in the centre a female figure stands on the tholos (a circular building). Ornate Corinthian columns support the various structures. The entrance is guarded by the statues of the twins Castor and Pollux, figures in Greek and Roman mythology. These sculptures link the decoration to Hellenistic themes. Over time, these intricate details have eroded. The entrance leads to three separate chambers. Whilst the exterior of the building is intricate, the interior is reasonably plain without any ornate designs.

=== The Monastery ===
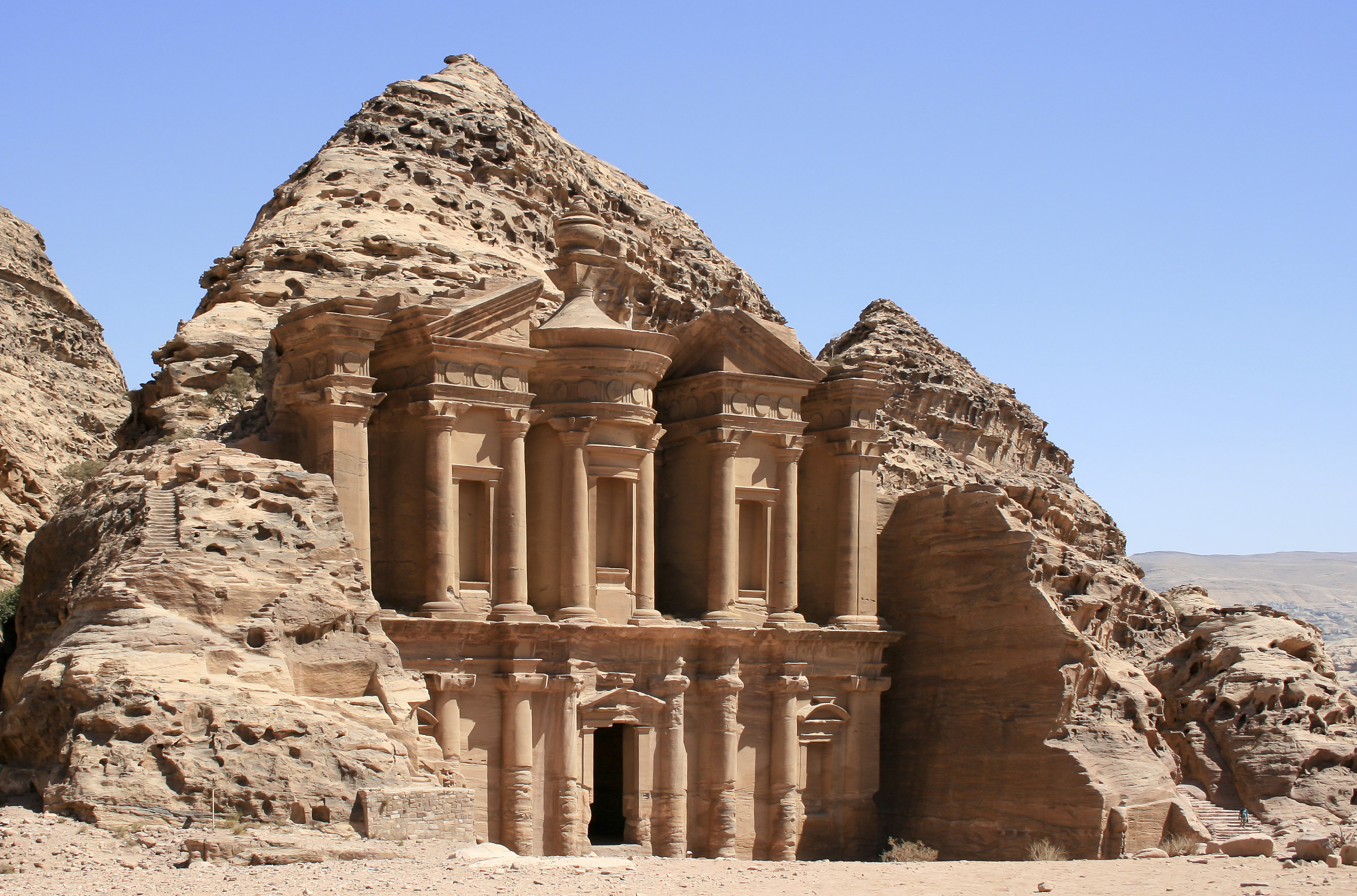
The Monastery

An example of one of the tombs located in Petra is the Monastery or Ad Deir. It is believed that this tomb was completed in the mid-first century as a dedication to King Obodas III. The building stands at 50m high and 45m tall. It’s simple Doric friezes made up of alternating circular metopes and triglyphs.

The columns standing on the outside of the monument are all in Nabataean style. The outside of the building contains several enormous niches which once but no longer hold statues. This tomb is an example of the evolution of Nabataean architectural forms. As it lacks the intricate carvings and detail of other monuments such as the Treasury and stands as an example of how the evolution of Nabataean forms has transformed from the elaborate to the simple.

== Vernacular architecture in Jordan ==
Vernacular architecture is an architectural style that is characterised by residence on needs, construction materials available and traditions specific to its particular locality. The vernacular architecture within Jordan was used by semi and wholly nomadic cultures in response to environmental, climatic and economic features of the Jordanian landscape.

=== The desert house ===
The traditional house of the population who lived in the desert known as the Bedouin people was a tent. The tents come in variable sizes and depending on the size of the family, were divided into several rooms. The Bedouin people primarily raised livestock and focused on agricultural activities. The tent rooms, whilst they may have a variety of uses such as housing livestock, didn’t have a fixed use. They were made from easily accessible materials, the exterior was animal-fibre cloth which was supported by wooden poles.

The purpose of the tent was to protect the inhabitants from harsh weather conditions such as torrential rainfall and extremely hot temperatures. When it was no longer necessary to protect the interior from sand storms, one of the longer sides of the tent could be opened to provide a natural method of ventilation.

=== Villages of the Transjordan Highlands ===
Before Jordan was established as an independent state in 1946, its population consisted mainly of semi-nomads who settled in villages. In the early 19th century, the Ottoman Empire promoted agriculture to compensate for a shortage of agricultural production in the Balkans. When they initiated the Ottoman Land Code, it resulted in a gradual stratification within the village community into two groups, landowners (Mellakin) and share-croppers (Fellahin).

Mellakin families mainly lived on the high ground in courtyard-style houses. They had vaulted roof systems and elaborate detailing. Fellahin families resided in small scattered housing in the lower parts of the village. These houses were typically a single room approximately 400 cm x 600 cm. The chimney was a small hole in the ceiling. The walls consisted of three layers, the outer layers made of dry-stone line and the filler layer which consisted of compacted earth mixed with smaller stones. The interior was divided by an arch-wall often built with dry stone. The thickness could vary from 50 to 100 cm. The area used as a living area during the day time was transformed into a bedroom at night. Inhabitants used a rolling-stone to compact dirt in order to elevate the room’s floor. Fellahin houses contained a single door, which was placed parallel to the arch-wall.

=== The Jordan Valley house ===
Traditional houses of the Jordan Valley are typically modular, flat-roofed and single story. They are built with moulded mud sun dried bricks called adobe. This material is suitable as it maintains a comfortable temperature within the house when temperatures have the potential to reach 50 °C. The walls are generally 50 cm thick. Very rarely would a Jordan Valley house consist of one room, instead they are divided into 2-5 modules arranged one next to the other. The main section often has small windows and a single-entry point. Small intern doors allow the inhabitant to pass through to each room.

== Modern Jordanian architecture ==
After independence, changing social and economic conditions influenced modern Jordanian architecture. As Jordan became more open to the ideals of the global world, their architecture did so too. Rather than following the traditional Vernacular styles, buildings reflected international trends. This was also a result of an increased number of qualified architects who had completed their degrees in foreign countries and were registered by the Department of Land and Surveying. Most commonly, new buildings attempted to incorporate the architectural heritage of past buildings with new international styles in an effort to find an Architectural identity within Jordan. Buildings were characterised by the evolving materials used during construction including; concrete, marble, glass, metal and roof tiles and the diversity of their functions.

CULTURAL DIVERSITY OF JORDANIAN ARCHITECTURE
PROJECT	DATE. OF IMPLEMENTATION	HERITAGE RESOURCE
Jordan's Parliament Building	1980	Islamic
Ministry of Communication and Information Technology	1982	Nabataean
King Abdullah I Gardens	1988	Roman
City Hall of the Greater Amman Municipality	1997	Islamic/Vernacular
Urban Planning and Landscaping of Ras al-Ain	1997	Roman/Vernacular
Feynan Eco Lodge	2005	Vernacular

=== Notable buildings ===
Le Royal Hotel Amman

==== Jordan's Parliament Building ====
Jordan’s parliament building was one of the first attempts to represent the nation’s Islamic architectural heritage as the architect referenced the Dome of the Rock in Jerusalem in the project. This is also represented in the octagonal shape and repeated arches. The monumental facade and use of hollow bricks and glass meant the building was classified in a modern style.

==== Le Royal Hotel ====
The Le Royal Hotel in Amman combines Arab and Islamic architecture to resemble the designs of the Tower of Babel and Helicobacter (Malwiya) located in Iraq. The building's influence is grounded in the owner's Iraqi heritage, this is evident in the combination of the creativity of design with modern construction methods. It stands at 108m, and at the time of its completion was the tallest building in Jordan.

==== Feynan Eco Lodge ====
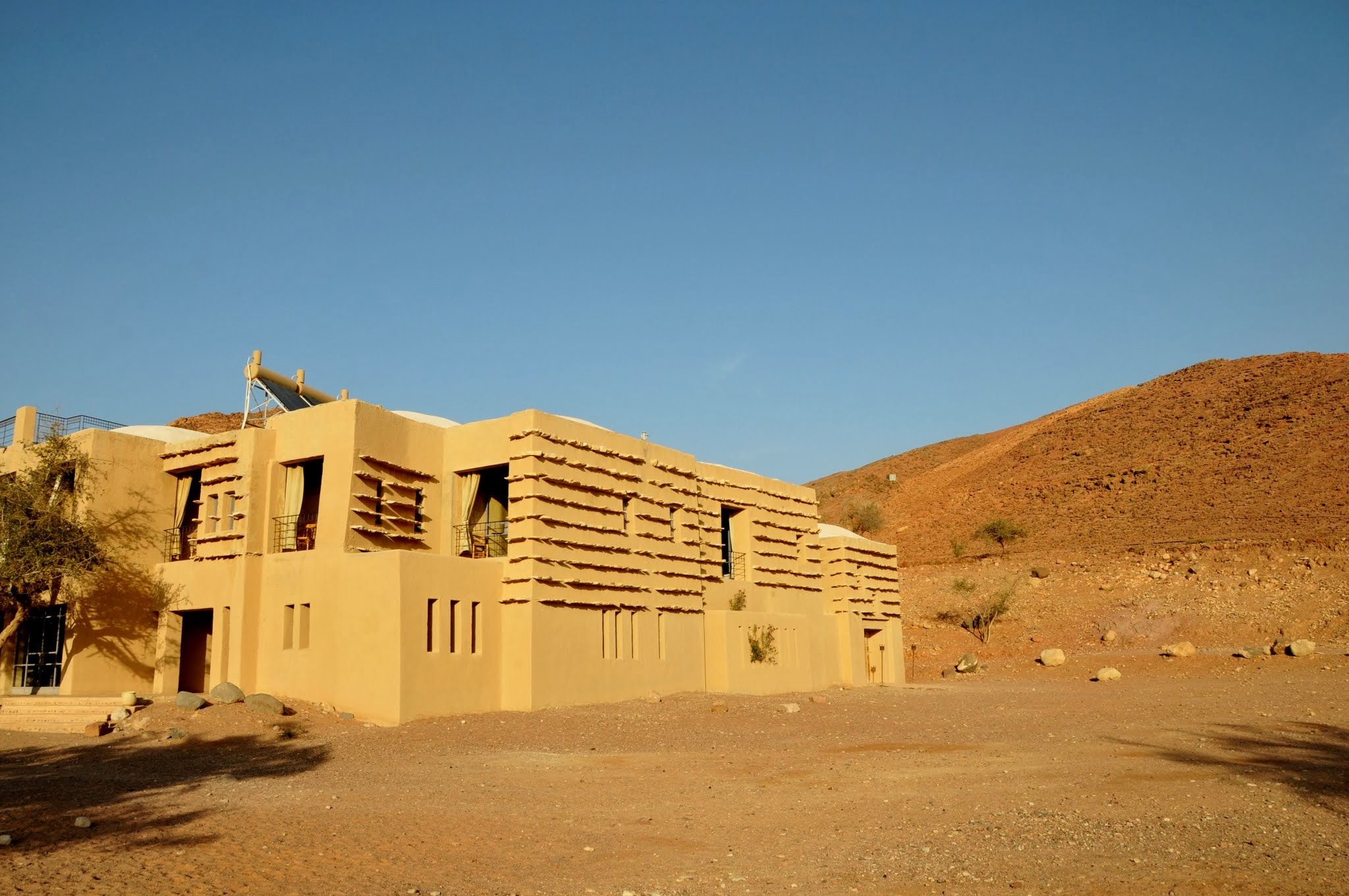
The Feynan Eco Lodge

Designed by architect Ammar Khammash and located in the Dana Biosphere Reserve, the Feynan Eco Lodge was one of Jordan’s first steps toward ecotourism. It is influenced by desert architecture in arid landscapes and integrates conservation and socio-economic development. The inclusion of domes, vaults and mud skin associates it with local and traditional buildings in the region. It is an example of using hybrid solutions by combining traditional materials and structure with contemporary building requirements and environmental design techniques.

== UNESCO World Heritage Sites ==
Jordan is home to a total of five UNESCO World Heritage Sites. Specifically, four cultural sites and one mixed site. All of the sites give an insight into the different cultures who have lived in Jordan and their impact on the country.

UNESCO WORLD HERITAGE SITES IN JORDAN
SITE	YEAR OF INSCRIPTION	TYPE
Petra	1985	Cultural
Quseir Amra	1985	Cultural
Um er-Rasas (Kastrom Mefa'a)	2004	Cultural
Wadi Rum Protected Area	2011	Mixed
Bethany Beyond the Jordan (Al-Maghtas) - Baptism Site of Jesus Christ	2015	Cultural

=== Petra ===
The remains of the Nabataean civilisation in Petra stands as a prime example of ancient Eastern traditions meeting Hellenistic architecture.

=== Quseir Amra ===
Quseir Amra was built during the 8th century. It is a desert castle which is part of a larger castle complex, however, much of what remains of the other castles is ruins. The frescoes and murals on the ceiling of the castle which depict the life of earlier settlers in the region is what gives it such cultural significance. The castle served as a military base after its destruction. Its reasoning for becoming a world heritage site was its demonstration of the Umayyad civilisation.

=== Um er-Rasas (Kastrom Mefa'a) ===
Um er-Rasas was built in the 5th century and was utilised by the Roman military as a base due to its accessibility as a trading route in the Jordanian Desert. It is considered culturally important due to its biblical connections, having been mentioned in the Book of Jeremiah. Its architecture displays facets of the Christian and Islamic communities who occupied the area after the Romans, as well as having preserved ruins from the Byzantine period such as churches and mosaic floors.

=== Bethany Beyond Jordan (Al-Maghtas) ===
Bethany Beyond Jordan is located along the east bank of the Jordan River. It is believed to be the original location where John the Baptist baptised Jesus. The two areas of the site which give it such archeological significance are the remains of churches and baptism ponds and the remnants of the Jabal Mar-Elias which was a monastery also known as Elijah's Hill.

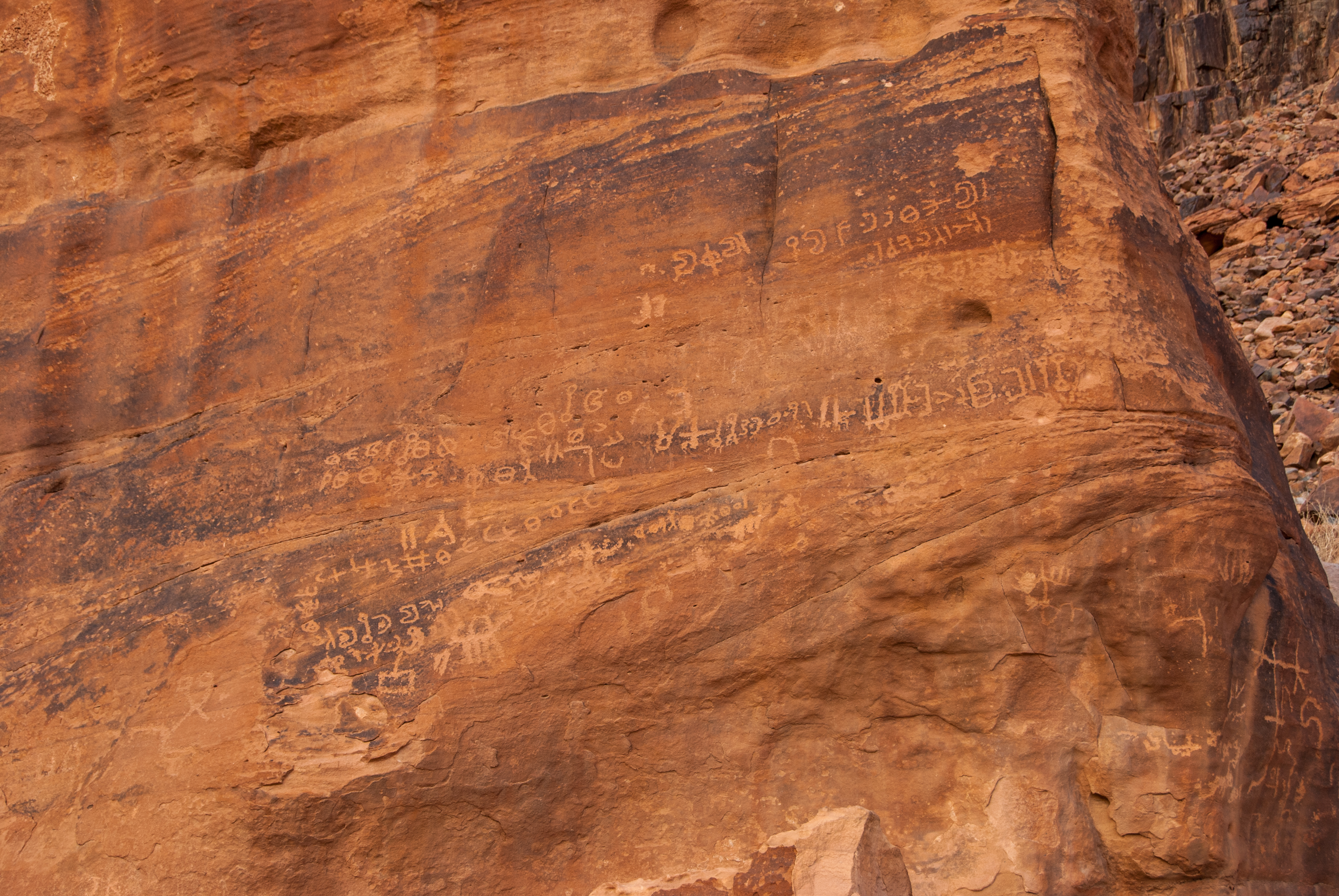
Thamudic inscriptions Wadi Rum

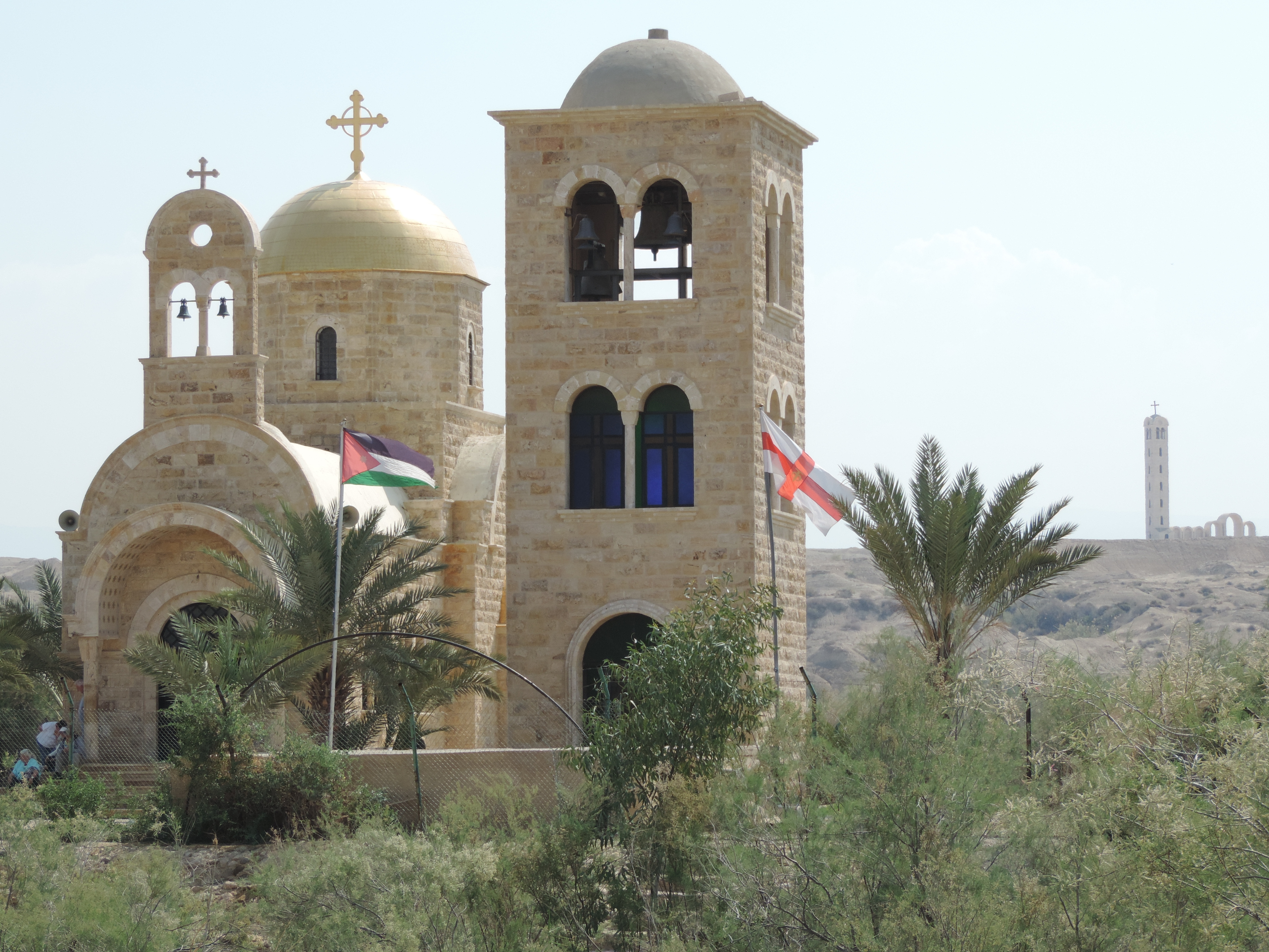
Churches at Bethany Beyond Jordan

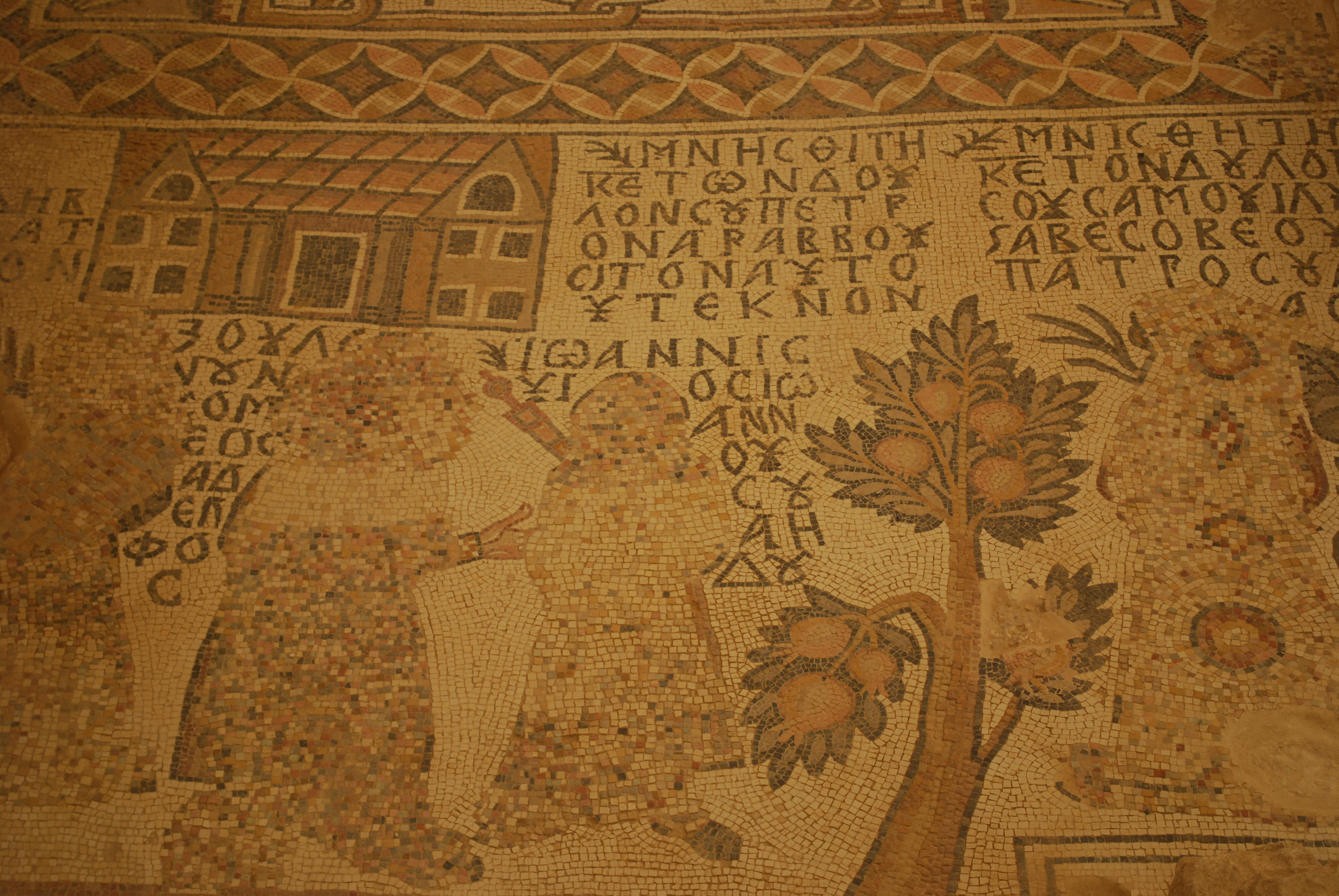
An example of the mosaic floors at Um Er-Rasas

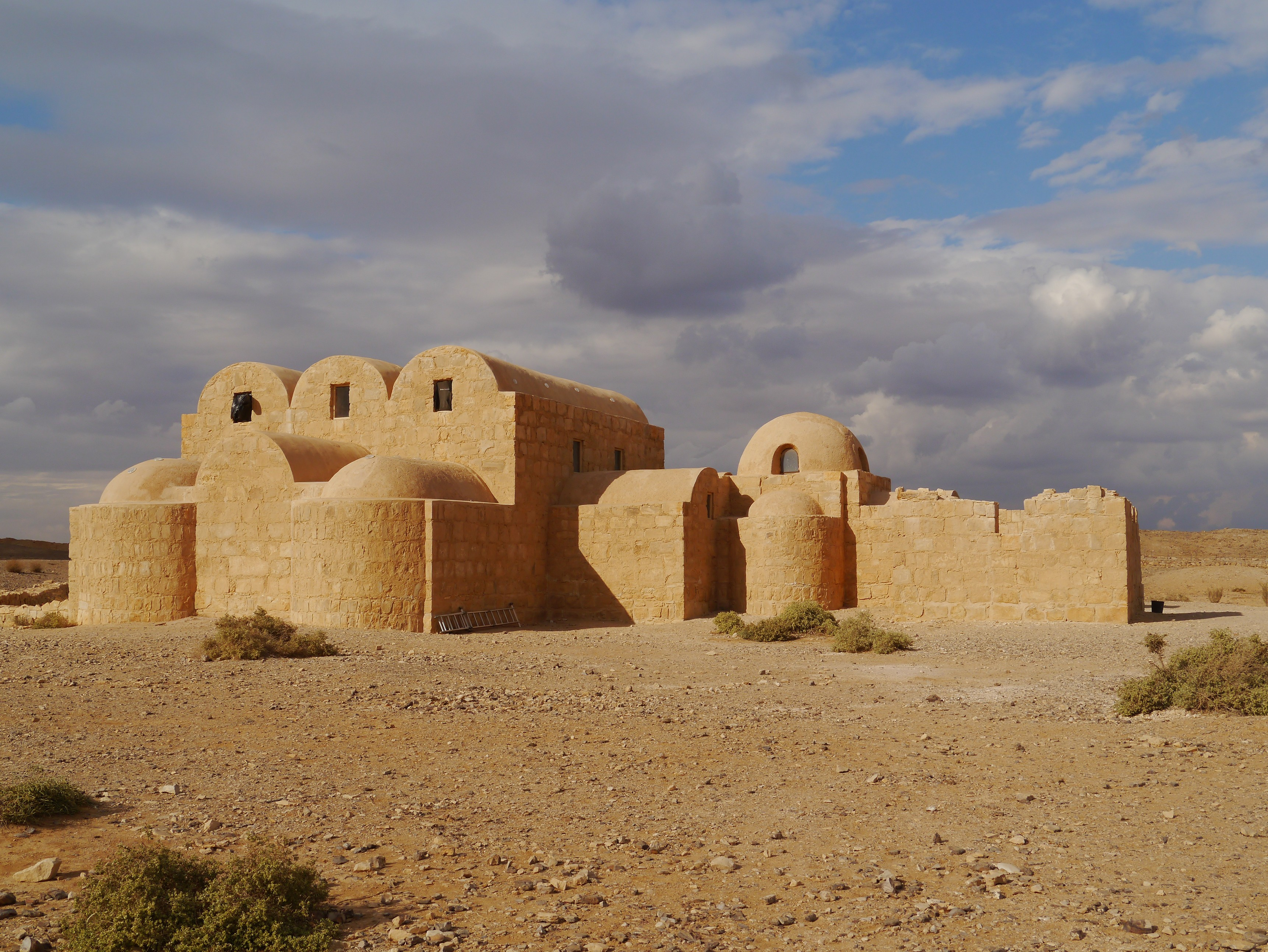
Qusair Amra

== See also ==
- List of tallest buildings in Amman
- Umayyad architecture
