= The Women of al-Basatin =

Book by Habib Selmi

- Author: Habib Selmi
- Language: Arabic
- Genre: Novel
- Publisher: Dar Al-Adab for publishing
- Publication date: 2010
- Pages: 207
- ISBN: 978-9953-89-013-5

The Women of al-Basatin is a novel written by Tunisian novelist Habib Selmi and published by The House of Arts in 2010. It was selected on the short list for the World Prize for Arabic Fiction in 2012. The novel is about Tawfiq, a Tunisian immigrant in France who visits his brother Ibrahim's house in Al-Basatin district of Tunis in Tunisia, for the summer holidays. The novel's second edition was published in 2012 and translated into French as Smile, You're in Tunisia! by Actes Sud House in 2013.

== Plot ==
The novel tells the story of Tawfiq, the narrator, a Tunisian immigrant who works as a professor of history and geography in one of Paris secondary schools who spends his summer vacation in the apartment of his brother Ibrahim and his wife Yusra in one of the condominia of al-Basatin district of Tunis and prepare their son's Wael room for him to stay in for the duration of his stay in Tunisia. Their third brother, Bashir, visits them twice in Ibrahim's apartment, who is a doctor and owns a domesticated to raise chickens in Beja and becomes a prominent member of the Constitutional Democratic Rally Party. In his second visit, he comes with three chickens. Tawfiq wanders around the city's antiques with his teacher friend “Najib Kamoun” in Tunis district and they visit a brothel where Najib admires one of the prostitute who demands a hefty payment for sex. Tawfiq admires Naima, a divorced woman who lives alone in an apartment in the same building as Ibrahim's. He voyeurs several times from Wael's chamber window on Naima and tries to approach her. He once spotted a young child and a man in her apartment. Then Tawfiq meets Yisra's sister, Leila, who asks him to pass on her someday to accompany him to his apartment by her car. Tawfiq waits for Laila when she comes out of work, and she accompanies him to her house where she entices him, so he sleeps with her. Tawfiq regrets his act, but when he sees his brother, Ibrahim, accompanied with his teacher friend, enticing two prostitutes in the café of the International Hotel and taking them to an old building to sleep with them, it made him feel less guilty. Ibrahim then summons the police to Naima's room for prostitution accusation, and Naima gets arrested. On the last day before he travelled, Tawfiq met Naguib by coincidence of the café where they had met earlier and went to the same brothel where Naguib has slept with the woman he admired. Tawfiq finally prepares himself to travel.

== Characters ==
- Tawfiq, the narrator, a Tunisian immigrant in Paris who works as a professor of history and geography in one of Paris high schools.
- IBrahim, Tawfiq's brother, works as an employee of the Tunisian Electricity and Gas Company and lives in Al-Basatin district of Tunis in Tunisia.
- Yusra, Ibrahim's wife who is jobless.
- Laila, Yusra's sister, is an employee of a Tunisian public administration. She lives in al-Basatin district with her husband Mehdi. She had a sexual relationship with Tawfiq.
- Wael, Ibrahim's son, a young child.
- Naima, Ibrahim's neighbour in his building, police raid her apartment for prostitution.
- Najib Kamoun, Tawfiq's friend and a colleague. They met twice in a cafe in the city's antique district of Tunis in Tunisia.
- Catherine, Tawfiq's wife
- A bartender at the International Hotel Cafe, who asked Tawfik to help him migrate to France.
- Two prostitutes, met by the narrator once at the International Hotel Cafe and seen them again in the same place.
- The teacher, Ibrahim's friend, plays cards with him and they once took two prostitutes from the International Hotel Cafe, and slept with them.
