= Elias Farkouh =

Jordanian writer and novelist (1948–2020)

- Born: 1948; Amman, Jordan
- Died: July 15, 2020 (aged 71–72)

Elias Farkouh (Arabic: إلياس فركوح) (1948 – July 15, 2020) was a Jordanian short story writer and novelist. He was born in Amman in 1948 and was educated in Amman and East Jerusalem. He graduated from the Arab University of Beirut where he read philosophy and psychology. He worked as a journalist in the early part of his career. After working at the publishing house Al-Manarat, he set up his own house Dar Azminah in 1991 and ran it until his death.

== Work ==
Elias Farkouh published a number of short story collections and novels. His 2007 novel The Land of Purgatory was nominated for the inaugural Arabic Booker Prize, while his first novel Columns of Foam (1987) was selected as one of the 100 best Arabic novels of the 20th century by the Arab Writers' Union.

His short stories have been translated into English and appeared in Banipal magazine. He also translated Western literary works into Arabic, notably a book of short stories by Latin American women writers that was published in 1999.

Elias Farkouh won a number of Jordanian awards for his contributions to literature, including the State Meritorious Award (1997) and the Mahmud Sayf Ed-Din Irani Award, presented by the Jordanian Writers' Association.

== Selected works ==
=== Short story collections ===
- Al-Saf'a (The Slap) (1978)
- Tuyour Amman Tuhalliq Munkhafida (Amman's Birds Sweep Low) (1981)
- Ihda wa Eshrouna Talqa lil-Nabeyy (Twenty One Shots for the Prophet) (1982, winner of the 1982 Jordanian Writers' Association Award)
- Huqoul Al-Zilal (Fields of Shadows) (2002)

=== Novels ===
- Qamat al-zabad (Columns of Foam) (1987)
- Aamidat al-ghoubar (Pillars of Dust) (1996)
- Ard al-yambous (The Land of Purgatory) (2007, winner of the 2008 Jordanian Writers' Association Award)
- Asrar Sa'at Al Raml (Secrets Of The Sand-Clock) (ISBN 6140100275, Arabic, Arab Scientific Publishers, 2010)
