= Ibtisam Abdallah =

Iraqi novelist (died 2023)

Ibtisam Abdallah (Arabic: ابتسام عبد الله; 1942/1943 – 7 March 2023) was an Iraqi novelist, short-story writer and literary translator.

Abdallah was born in Kirkuk but had lived mostly in Baghdad. As of 2001, she had published four novels and one collection of short stories. The best-known of her novels is Mesopotamia, published in Baghdad in 2001. The same year, she became the editor-in-chief of Al-Thaqafa Al-Ajnabiyya (Foreign Culture), a quarterly journal devoted to foreign literature and culture, the only one of its kind in Iraq. (The magazine ceased publishing in the aftermath of the US invasion of Iraq in 2003.)

Abdallah translated several Western literary works into Arabic, notably JM Coetzee's award-winning novel Waiting for the Barbarians. She also translated the memoirs of Mikis Theodorakis and Angela Davis. Abdallah's writing is known for its juxtaposition of feminist themes with contemporary social and political issues. Some of her short stories have appeared in English translations. She was also well known in Iraq as a journalist and television personality.

== Works translated into English ==
- The Nursery, short story, appeared in Banipal 18 (2003) and Contemporary Iraqi fiction: an anthology (2008) by Shakir M. Mustafa
- In the Garden, short story, appeared in Al-Ahram Weekly in November 1998 in a translation by Denys Johnson-Davies
