= Mohammad al-Qaood =

Yemeni poet and short story writer (born 1967)

Mohammad al-Qaood (born 1967 in Taiz) is a Yemeni poet and short story writer. The author's work has been published in Banipal magazine. The author of 13 books of poetry, prose and short stories, he is the cultural editor of the al-Thawra newspaper which is based in the capital of Sanaa.
