= Rachida Lamrabet =

Belgian writer and lawyer

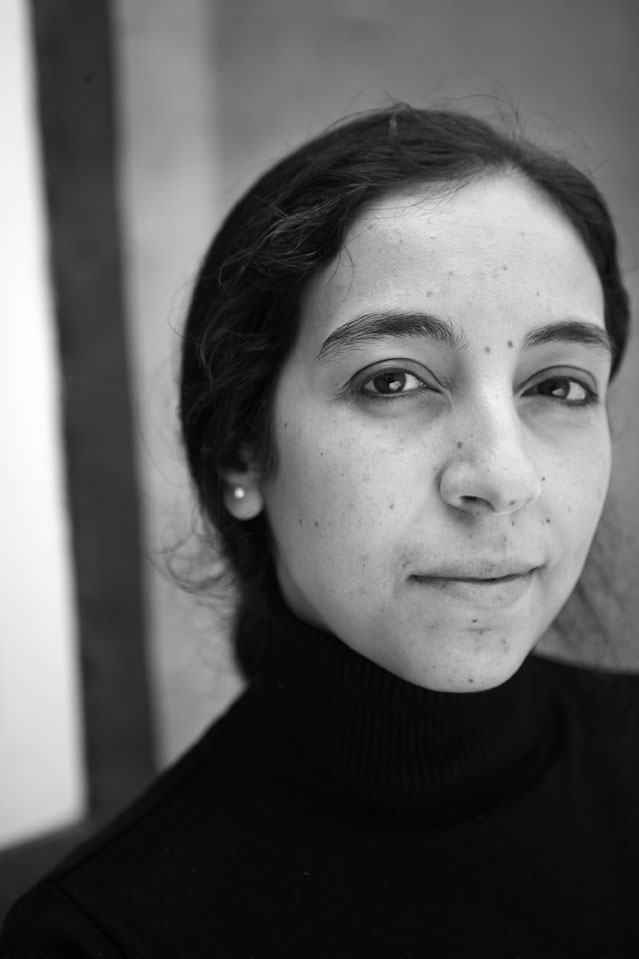
- Born: 1970 (age 55–56); Morocco
- Writing career
- Language: Dutch
- Genres: novel, short story, theatre

Rachida Lamrabet (born 1970) is a Moroccan-born Belgian writer and lawyer writing in Dutch.

A native of the Rif region, she came to Belgium with her parents in 1972. Lamrabet until recently worked as a lawyer for the Centre for Equal Opportunities and Opposition to Racism. Her first novel Vrouwland (Woman Country), published in 2007, received the Flemish Debuutprijs. In 2006, her story "‘Mercedes 207" was awarded the Kleur de kunst! (Colour the arts!) prize by Kif Kif; it was included in the anthology Kif Kif. New Voices from Flanders.

Her writing has appeared in Banipal, a magazine dedicated to contemporary Arab literature.

== Criticism ==
When she made the film 'debourkanisation' in March 2017 and signed several pro-Palestinian petitions she received a lot of criticism as this was not considered compliant with her function in the centre. Even her old manager Johan Leman went public on both issues. Ultimately this led to her dismissal: the Centre decided to distanciate publicly from her statements and fired her begin April 2017.

== Selected works ==
- Vrouwland (2007, Meulenhoff-Manteau)
- Een kind van God (Children of God), short stories (2008), received the BNG Nieuwe Literatuurprijs sponsored by the Bank Nederlandse Gemeenten
- De man die niet begraven wilde worden, novel (2011)
- De handen van Fatma, play (2014)
