= Ahmad Zein =

Yemeni writer and journalist

Ahmad Zein (born 1966) is a critically-acclaimed Yemeni writer and journalist, currently living in Riyadh, Saudi Arabia. He works for the Al-Hayat newspaper. He is the author of two novels and two short story collections. The author's work has been published in the Banipal magazine. His novel Fruit for the Crows was longlisted for the 2021 Arabic Booker Prize.

== Publications ==
- Correction (2004)
- American Coffee (2007)
- War Under the Skin (2010)
- Steamer Point (2015)

His work has been translated into English, French, and Russian.
