= Rawafed =

Television programme

- Created by: Al Arabiya
- Presented by: Ahmad Ali El Zein (2003–present)
- Theme music composer: Marcel Khalifa
- Country of origin: Arab countries
- Original languages: Arabic (TV channel and the website)

Production
- Running time: 25 minutes

Original release
- Network: MBC
- Release: 2003 – present

Rawafed is a flagship Al Arabiya television programme, consisting of a half-hour documentary broadcast once a week (Wednesday) on the Al Arabiya News Channel. Its host and director is Ahmad Ali El Zein, whose style of smooth questioning brought a huge world audience to the show. Launched in 2003, it was awarded in 2010 the golden prize for the best cultural and educational program at the 10th edition of the Gulf Media Festival.

Using a wealth of visuals from the guests' real lives, Rawafed takes the viewer as close as possible into the world of intellectuals, artists, and scientists who have enriched and still enrich the human knowledge and experience. Through a friendly interview, El Zein highlights their experiences, presents their works, and explores their opinions about the latest issues and developments occurring in the world of culture, arts, science and other matters of public interest.

The program has hosted since 2003 a number of most important Arabic intellectuals and artists, such as Algerian scholar Mohammed Arkoun, Moroccan writer Tahar Ben Jelloun, Egyptian theologian Nasr Abu Zayd, and Saudi novelist Abdul Rahman Munif.
