= The Scents of Marie-Claire =

2008 novel by Habib Selmi

- Author: Habib Selmi
- Language: Arabic
- Genre: Novel
- Publisher: Dar Al-Adab publishing house
- Publication date: 2008
- Pages: 223
- ISBN: 978-9953-89-013-5

The Scents of Marie-Claire is the seventh novel by Tunisian novelist Habib Selmi. The novel was first published in Lebanon in 2008 by the House of Literature for Publishing and Distribution. The novel was translated into a variety of languages, including English, French, Italian, and German, and made it to the final "short" list of the 2009 World Prize for Arabic Novel, known as the "Arab Booker Prize".

== About the Novel ==
The fragility and speed of a relationship are exposed in this novel, which follows the evolution of an emotional story at all stages: from the moment of exchanging first glances to separation, through the mystery, complexity, and confusion that characterize the relationship between a man and a woman. Moment by moment, the small details that accumulate reflect daily life in all of its authenticity and reality: from morning breakfast to clichéd personal habits, even the body's desires, instincts, and emotions, meet two civilizations and collide. The novelist depicts a love story between an Arab man and a Western woman symbolizing each other's value system, addressing the theme of the encounter or clash of civilizations between the East and the West.

== Novel's Translations ==
This novel has been translated into a variety of different languages. The most common translations are as follows:

- English: Printed in 2010 on the publications of the American University in Cairo and translated into English by the Palestinian writer and storyteller Fadwa al-Qasim.
- French: Printed in 2011 by «Actes sud House for publishing», translated into French by "Françoise Nerod".
- Italian: Published in 2013 by «Mizogia House for publishing», it was translated by the both Italians "Elizabeth Bartoli" and "Marco Swaffe".
- Germany: Published in 2013 by «Lenos House of publication» and translated by the German Arabist "Regina Karachouli".
