= Habib Selmi =

Tunisian novelist and short story writer (born 1951)

- Born: 31 January 1951 (age 74); Tunisia
- Occupation: Novelist

Habib Selmi (Tunisian Arabic: حبيب السالمي) (born 31 January 1951) is a Tunisian novelist and short story writer.

== Early life ==
He was born in Al-Ala near the historic city of Kairouan. To date, he has published eight novels and two short story collections.

== Career ==
His books include:

- Jabal al-'Anz (Goat Mountain), 1988
- Surat Badawi Mayyit (Portrait of a Dead Bedouin), 1990
- Matahat al-Raml (Sand Labyrinth), 1994
- Hufar Dafi'a (Warm Pits), 1999
- Ushaq Bayya (Bayya's Lovers), 2002
- Asrar Abdallah (Abdallah’s Secrets), 2006
- Rawaïh Marie-Claire (The Scents of Marie-Claire), 2008
- Nisāʾ al-basatīn (The Women of al-Basatin), 2011
- Al-ishtīāq ilā al-jāra (Longing for the Woman Next Door), 2020

His work has been shortlisted three times for the International Prize for Arabic Fiction, in 2009 (for The Scents of Marie-Claire), 2012 (for The Women of al-Basatin), and 2021 (for Longing for the Woman Next Door). His work has been translated into a number of languages, including English and French and has featured in multiple issues of Banipal magazine.

Selmi has lived in Paris since 1985, where he teaches Arabic literature.
