= Ines Abassi =

Tunisian poet and journalist (born 1982)

- إيناس عباسي
- Born: 1982 (age 43–44); Tunisia
- Occupations: Poet, journalist
- Employer: UAE-based publications
- Notable work: Secrets of the Wind, Archive of Blind, Tales of the Korean Scheherazade
- Awards: Tunisian Poetry Prize, CREDIF Prize

Ines Abassi (born 1982) is a Tunisian poet and journalist. She has published two volumes of poetry to date, both of which have received regional literary awards. She also spent a six-month residency in Seoul and wrote Tales of the Korean Scheherezade out of that experience. Her work has been published in numerous outlets including the literary magazine Banipal, where her work was included in an issue devoted to Modern Tunisian Literature.

Abassi currently works as a journalist in the UAE.

== Works ==
- Secrets of the Wind (2004), collection of poetry, winner of the Tunisian Poetry Prize
- Archive of Blind (2007), collection of poetry, winner of the CREDIF prize, Tunis
- Tales of the Korean Scheherezade (2010)
