= The Night of the First Billion =

1986 novel by Ghada Al-Samman

- Author: Ghada Al-Samman
- Translator: Nancy Roberts
- Language: Arabic/English (Trans.)
- Genre: Literary fiction
- Published: 1986
- Publisher: Ghada Al-Samman Publishing
- Pages: 442

The Night of the First Billion is the 1986 novel by the Syrian writer Ghada Al-Samman. It is considered to be one of the most important Arabic novels published during the 1980s. It is also an experimental novel, for Al-Samman employs stream-of-consciousness. The novel navigates topics like contradiction in Arab societies, humanity, and extreme wealth.

== Summary ==
The novel opens with the main characters’, Khalil and his wife (Kifa), house getting bombed, after the murder of their daughter (Wedad) in the Lebanese Civil War. The two characters and their sons run away to Switzerland after the Israeli colonization of the Lebanese lands and the civil war. After arriving to Geneva, they meet Arab diaspora and dive into their contradictory worlds: The world of the riches and the world of the radicals, leading to the conflict between revolution and wealth. On one hand, the characters undergo psychological conflict, and on the other hand, they undergo physical conflict. Through the novel, Al-Samman portrays that moving away is a luxury only financially well-of people have. She critiques this idea, closing off the novel with “if we all leave, who cuts the thread?”

== Literary criticism ==
Despite Al-Samman's role in the development of the Syrian novel, (The Night of the First Billion) reflects the situation of the Lebanese revolutionary and the Lebanese diaspora. Some critics consider Al-Samman's approach to the novel highly influenced by western literature, especially since her literarily active years were during Arab society's opening to western culture. For example, her employment of the stream-of-consciousness, secular existentialism, and feminism were attributed to her influence by western culture. Whilst Al-Samman was influenced - to a degree - by western culture, she did not glorify western societies. As a matter of fact, her awareness of the vileness of European colonization could be seen throughout her bibliography.
