= Ali Mohammed Zayd =

Yemeni ambassador, writer and translator

- Occupations: Ambassador, writer and translator

Ali Mohammed Zayd is a Yemeni ambassador, writer and translator, currently living in Paris. He was delegate of Yemen to UNESCO from 1990 to 2000 and has published three novels, two historical works and translated works into Arabic from French and English. The author's work has been published in Banipal magazine.
