= Shawqi Shafiq =

Yemeni poet and translator (born 1955)

Shawqi Shafiq (born 1955 in Aden) is a Yemeni poet and translator. The author's work has been published in Banipal magazine. The author of eight books of poetry, some of his works have been published in several languages.
