= Samuel Shimon =

Iraqi writer and journalist of Assyrian descent

Samuel Shimon (born 1956 in Al-Habbaniyah, Iraq) is an Iraqi writer and journalist of Assyrian descent. He left Iraq in 1979 with dreams of becoming a director in Hollywood, and has since then lived in Damascus, Amman, Beirut, Nicosia, Aden, Cairo, Tunis and Paris, before finally settling in London. Along with his wife Margaret Obank, he is a co-founder and, since issue #39, editor of the literary magazine Banipal.

Shimons first novel, Iraqi fi Baris (An Iraqi in Paris) was published in 2005. Boyd Tonkin wrote of the book in The Independent, calling it "an Arabic answer to Miller's Tropic of Cancer".

== Sources ==
- "En irakier i Paris av Samuel Shimon" (in Swedish). Alhambra förlag.
- "Samuel Shimon". The English Pen Online World Atlas.
