= Pauline Vinson =

American artist

- Born: June 23, 1915; Orange, California, U.S.
- Died: June 22, 1986 (aged 70); Santa Clara, California, U.S.

Pauline Eckles Young (née Vinson, June 23, 1915 – June 22, 1986) was an American artist and illustrator.

Vinson was born on June 23, 1915, in Orange, California. She lived in San Francisco before moving to New York City to work as a book illustrator. While in San Francisco, she did a series of lithographs for the Works Progress Administration.

Her work is included in the collections of the Smithsonian American Art Museum, the National Gallery of Art, Washington the Fine Arts Museums of San Francisco. Vinson's married surname was Young. She died in Santa Clara on June 22, 1986, at the age of 70.

== Books ==
- Willie Goes to the Hospital
- Festivals in San Francisco, 1939, illustrator
- Around the World in San Francisco, 1940, illustrator
- Hilltop Russians in San Francisco, 1941, illustrator
