= Jamal Abu Hamdan =

Jamal Abu Hamdan (1944–2015) was a Jordanian writer. He was born into a Druze family in the southern Syrian province of As-Suwayda. He was educated in Amman, Cairo and Beirut, completing a law degree from Beirut Arab University in 1966.

Abu Hamdan is best known in the Arab world for his short stories and plays which have been performed widely. He was also known for his acclaimed dramatizations of several TV series broadcast on Arab-language television. His work has appeared in English translation in Granta magazine and a couple of anthologies.

He died in Fayetteville, Arkansas in April 2015.
