= Luay Hamza Abbas =

Iraqi writer (born 1965)

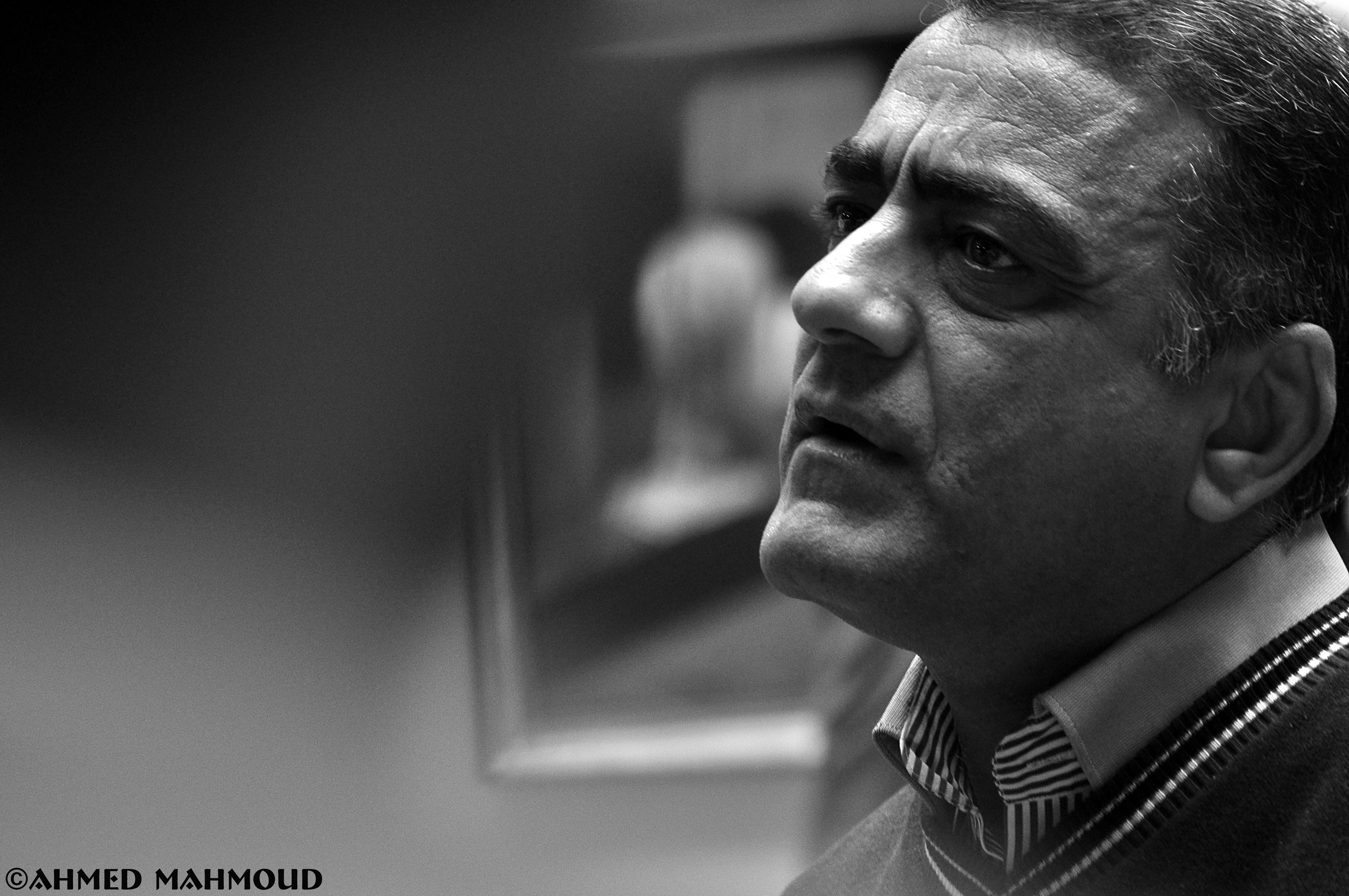
Luay Hamza Abbas

Luay Hamza Abbas (born 1965) is an Iraqi writer. He now teaches literary criticism at Basra University. Abbas has published several volumes of short stories and one novel.

In 2010, the National Endowment of the Arts awarded a grant to academic and translator Yasmeen Hanoosh to translate Abbas' short story collection Closing His Eyes (2008). The title story of this volume was translated earlier in Banipal 27 and also won the 2006 Kikah Best Short Story Award in London.
