= Akkar al-Atika =

Akkar al-Atika عكار العتيقه
- Municipality
- Location in Lebanon
- Coordinates: 34°31′30″N 36°14′25″E
- Country: Lebanon
- Governorate: Akkar
- District: Akkar

Area
  - Total: 28.38 km^{2} (10.96 sq mi)
- Elevation: 1,250 m (4,100 ft)

Population
  - Estimate (2011): 17,000
- Time zone: UTC+2 (EET)
  - Summer (DST): UTC+3 (EEST)

Akkar al-Atika (Arabic: عكار العتيقه, romanized: ʿAkkār al-ʿAtīqa; also spelled Akkar al-Atiqa or Aakkar El Aatiqa) is a town and municipality located in the Akkar Governorate in northern Lebanon. It is about 135 kilometres (84 mi) north of Beirut. Akkar al-Atika contains the 11th-century fortress of Gibelacar (Hisn Ibn Akkar in Arabic), which was utilized by the Crusaders and became the headquarters of the Sayfa clan, whose members were chieftains and Ottoman governors of Tripoli and its districts in from the late 16th until the mid-17th centuries.

The village had an estimated population of 17,000 living in about 3,550 houses in 2011. Its inhabitants are Sunni Muslims. The average elevation of Akkar al-Atika is 1,250 metres (4,100 ft) above sea level and the village has a total land area of 2,838 hectares. Most of the village's labor force, who form about a third of the population, mainly work in the military or education sector with about 10% deriving their main income from permanent or seasonal agriculture. Nonetheless, agriculture constitutes as a supplementary income for much of the population. The relatively large role it plays in the village stems from its abundance of cultivable land; most of the village's households own at least a tract of agricultural land or work in it. The principal crops grown apples, walnuts, peaches, persimmon, olives and tomatoes and the main agricultural products are apple cider and vinegar, fruit jams, chickens, milk and cheeses. Much of Akkar al-Atika's agricultural output is sold in the markets of Tripoli and the governorate capital of Halba.

Akkar al-Atika has abundant forest lands, though over half of its forests were destroyed between 2000 and 2010 due to fires, woodcutting and conversion of the lands for agricultural use.

== Notable residents ==
- Ahmad Ali El Zein, novelist, filmmaker and journalist
