= Rashad Abu Shawar =

- رشاد أبو شاور
- Born: 15 June 1942; Zikrin, Hebron, Palestine
- Died: 28 September 2024 (aged 82); Amman
- Occupation(s): short story writer and novelist

Rashad Abu Shawar (Arabic: رشاد أبو شاور, romanized: Rashād Abū Shāwir; 15 June 1942 – 28 September 2024) was a Palestinian short story writer and novelist, and was a member of the Palestinian National Council. He received the Palestine Appreciation Award 2019.

== Biography ==
Abu Shawar was born in Zikrin, Hebron, Palestine, on 15 June 1942. He held several positions in institutions of the Palestine Liberation Organization (PLO), and worked at the Unified Media Council in Beirut. He died in Amman on 28 September 2024.

== Works ==
He published more than 7 novels and short stories, including:

- Ayyām al-ḥarb wa al-mawt (Arabic: أيام الحرب والموت), 1973
- Bayt Akhḍar Dhū Saqf qrmydy (Arabic: بيت أخضر ذو سقف قرميدي), 1974
- al-Bukāʼ ʻalá Ṣadr al-Ḥabīb (Arabic: البكاء على صدر الحبيب), 1974
- al-Ashjār lā tnmw ʻalá al-dafātir (Arabic: الأشجار لا تنمو على الدفاتر), 1975
- al-ʻUshshāq (Arabic: العشاق), 1978
- ʻIṭr al-Yāsamīn (Arabic: عطر الياسمين), 1978
- Arḍ al-ʻAsal (Arabic: أرض العسل), 1979
- al-Rabb lam ystrḥ fī al-yawm al-sābiʻ (Arabic: الرب لم يسترح في اليوم السابع), 1986
