= Banipal =

Literary magazine devoted to Arab literature

- Categories: Literary magazine
- Frequency: 3 per year
- Founder: Margaret Obank and Samuel Shimon
- Founded: 1998
- Company: Banipal
- Country: United Kingdom
- Based in: London
- Language: English
- Website: www.banipal.co.uk
- ISSN: 1461-5363

Banipal was an independent literary magazine dedicated to the promotion of contemporary Arabic literature through translations in English. It was founded in London in 1998 by Margaret Obank and Samuel Shimon. The magazine was published three times a year. Since its inception, it published works and interviews of numerous Arab authors and writers, many of them translated for the first time into English. It has also co-sponsored the Saif Ghobash–Banipal Prize for Arabic Literary Translation.

As of December 2022, 75 issues of Banipal had been published. With this, the editors announced the final edition. Each issue usually focuses on a specific theme, recent issues focusing on Libyan fiction, Arab American authors, Iraqi authors, Literature in Yemen Today, Writing in Dutch, etc. The magazine has been praised both by non-Arab and Arab commentators - Gamal el-Ghitani, James Kirkup, Anton Shammas among others - for its role in spreading Arabic literature to a wider audience. The Iraqi poet, novelist and translator Fadhil Al Azzawi said:

What Banipal has achieved for Arab literature and culture in its 21 issues is more important than all the work of all the Arab ministries of culture, which have almost completely failed to do anything for Arab culture. Banipal has enabled the English reader not only to read the works of Arab writers, but also to discover the real craft of modern Arab literature. We have only one real minister for Arab culture: Margaret Obank.

== Contemporary authors featured in Banipal ==
- Abbas Beydhoun
- Abdel Aziz al-Maqalih
- Abdellatif Laâbi
- Abdelrahman Munif
- Abdelwahab Meddeb
- Abdullah Laroui
- Abdul Kader el-Janabi
- Abdu Khal
- Abdul Wahab al-Bayati
- Adunis
- Ahmad Ali El Zein
- Ahmad Zein
- Ahmed Fagih
- Ahmed Bouzfour
- Ahmed Rashid Thani
- Ala Hlehel
- Alawiyya Subh
- Albert Cossery
- Ali al-Domaini
- Ali al-Kasimi
- Ali al-Muqri
- Ali Mohammed Zayd
- Amjad Nasser
- Anton Shammas
- Aroussia Naluti
- Aziz Chouaki
- Badr Shakir al-Sayyab
- Baha Eddine Taoud
- Bassam Frangieh
- Bassam Shamseldin
- Bensalim Himmich
- Denys Johnson-Davies
- Diya al-Jubaily
- Driss Chraïbi
- Edward al-Kharrat
- Edward Said
- Elias Khoury
- Etel Adnan
- Ezzat el-Kamhawi
- Fadhil al-Azzawi
- Fady Joudeh
- Fathi Abul Nasr
- Ferial Ghazoul
- Fuad al-Takarli
- Gamal el-Ghitani
- Ghalib Halasa
- Ghassan Zaqtan
- Ghazi Algosaibi
- Habib Abdulrab Sarori
- Habib Selmi
- Habib Tengour
- Haifa Bitar
- Halim Barakat
- Hanan al-Shaykh
- Hani al-Raheb
- Hassan Abdulrazzak
- Hassan Daoud
- Hassan Nasr
- Hassouna Mosbahi
- Hoda Barakat
- Huda Ablan
- Hussain al-Mozany
- Huzama Habayeb
- Ibrahim Nasrallah
- Ibtisam Abdallah
- Inaya Jaber
- Ines Abassi
- Issa J Boullata
- Jalil al-Qaisi
- Jamal Mahjoub
- Jamila Omairah
- Kadhim Jihad
- Kamal Abdellatif
- Kamal Ruhayyim
- Khaled Mattawa
- Khalid Albudoor
- Khulood Al Mu’alla
- Lamia Makaddam
- Lisa Suhair Majaj
- Luay Hamza Abbas
- Lutfiya al-Dulaimi
- Mahdi Issa al-Saqr
- Mahmood Abdel Wahab
- Mahmoud Darwish
- Mahmoud Shukair
- Mai Ghoussoub
- Miled Faiza
- Miral al-Tahawy
- Mohamed al-Bisatie
- Mohamed Choukri
- Mohamed Salah al-Azab
- Mohammad al-Maghut
- Mohammad al-Qaood
- Mohammad al-Shaibani
- Mohammad Ali Farhat
- Mohammad Khodayyi
- Mohammed Al-Harthi
- Mohammed Bennis
- Mohammed Khaïr-Eddine
- Mohammed Mustagab
- Mohammed Zefzaf
- Mohja Kahf
- Mona Yahia
- Mouayed al-Rawi
- Nabila al-Zubair
- Nadia Alkowkobani
- Naguib Mahfouz
- Najwa Barakat
- Nassif Falak
- Nazih Abu Afash
- Nazik al-Malaika
- Nazum al-Obeidi
- Nirvana Tanoukhi
- Nizar Qabbani
- Nouri al-Jarrah
- Nujoom Al-Ghanem
- Ounsi el Hage
- Paul Chaoul
- Qassim Haddad
- Rabee Jaber
- Rachid al-Daif
- Rachida Lamrabet
- Rafik Schami
- Ramsey Nasr
- Rasha Omran
- Rashad Abu Shawar
- Sa'adallah Wannus
- Saadi Youssef
- Said al-Kafrawi
- Saif al-Rahbi
- Salah Hassan
- Salim Barakat
- Salwa al-Neimi
- Samar Yazbek
- Samir Albufattah
- Samir Naqqash
- Saniya Salih
- Sargon Boulus
- Sawsan al-Areeqi
- Shawqi Shafiq
- Tahar Ben Jelloun
- Tayeb Salih
- Turki al-Hamad
- Vénus Khoury-Ghata
- Wacini Laradg
- Wajdi al-Ahdal
- Wilfred Thesiger
- Yasmine Khlat
- Yasser Abdel Baqi
- Yasser Abdel Hafez
- Youssef Rakha
- Yusef Habshi al-Ashqar
- Zakariyya Tamer
