= Ahmad Ali El Zein =

Lebanese author and journalist (born 1956)

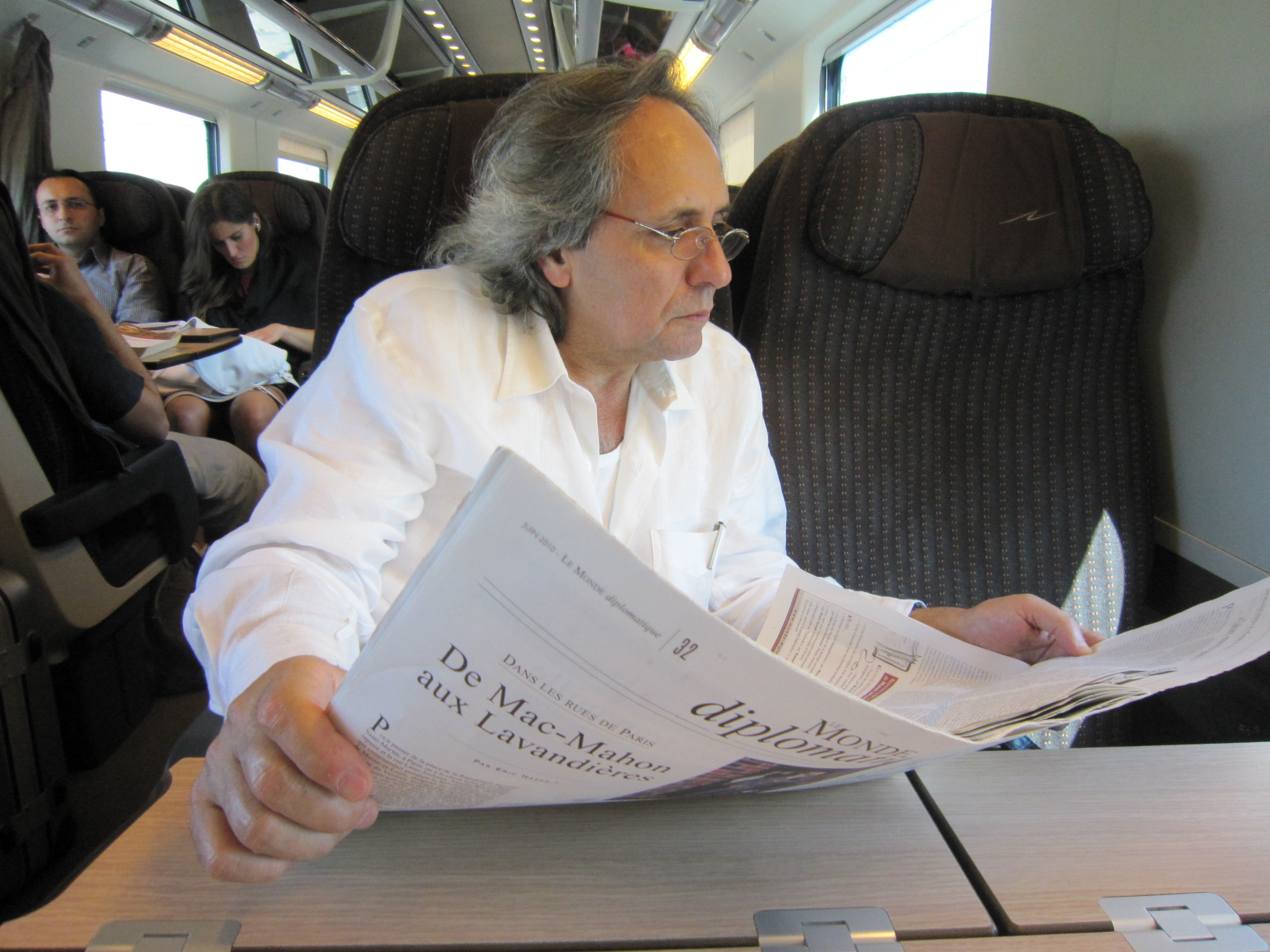
- Born: March 5, 1955 (age 71); Akkar, Lebanon
- Occupations: Novelist, documentary film maker, television journalist
- Writing career
- Language: Arabic
- Genres: Novels, documentary
- Notable works: The Edge of Oblivion, Suhabt al-Tayr, Barid al-Ghoroob

Ahmad Ali El Zein (born 1956) is a Lebanese novelist, documentary film maker and television journalist. He is best known for his trilogy of novels, The Edge of Oblivion (2007), Suhbat al-Tayer (2010) and Barid al-Ghouroub (2014). He lives between Europe and the Middle East, where he shoots Rawafed, a series of documentaries on Arab intellectuals and artists broadcast on Al Arabiya News Channel

== Biography ==
Ahmad Ali El Zein was born in March 1956 in the village of Akkar al-Atika, north Lebanon, to Ali El-Zein and Fatima al-Mohamad. He grew up in a rural and pastoral environment in the Lebanese northern mountains of Akkar amid thick woods.

El Zein studied music and theatre at the Lebanese University, Beirut. He started as a journalist in 1978 and wrote cultural essays, articles and editorials for al-Nida newspaper, Annahar, Assafir, al-Hayat and Zahrat al-Khalij.

In 1986, he produced, wrote and presented dozens of comedies and political shows for Radio Sawt al-Sha’b.

For television, he directed documentary films (1992–1994) portraying contemporary Lebanese artists, singers, musicians, writers and poets for Tele Liban. From 1997 to 2000, he contributed to the editing and production of several episodes of the talk show Hiwar al-Omr, presented by Gisel Khoury and broadcast on Lbc Channel. On Abu Dhabi TV in 2001–2003, he edited and directed Qiraat, a program presenting the latest and most important books. He also wrote, edited and directed a series of short documentaries on celebrities of the 20th century such as Zakariyya Ahmad, Mohammed Abdel Wahab, Asmahan, Oum Kalthoum, Abdel Halim Hafez, Farid al-Atrash, Laila Murad, Mohamed El Qasabgi and Fairuz.

One of his plays, Ru'ya (Vision)], was staged at the UNESCO Castle Theatre in Beirut in 2000. He wrote Al-Tayoun (1988), Khirbat al-Nawwah (1992), Ma'bar al-Nadam (1998) and Hafat al-Nisyan (2007). The Edge of Oblivion, the first volume of his Thulathiyat Abdul Jalil Ghazal trilogy, was serialised in Banipal, It was followed by Sohbat al-Tayer (2011) and Barid al-Ghouroub (2014).

In 2003, El Zein started shooting a series of documentaries entitled Rawafed and broadcast on Al Arabiya News Channel. Rawafed was awarded the golden prize for the best cultural and educational program at the 10th Gulf Media Festival.

== List of works ==
Novels

- Al-Tayoun, 1988
- Khirbat al-Nawah, 1992
- Ma'bar al-Nadam, 1998
- Hafat al-Nisyan, 2007
- Suhbat al-Tayr, 2010
- Barid al-Ghorub, 2014

Play

- Ru'ya

== Sources ==
- Aplin, Thomas (2008), "Excerpt from The Edge of Oblivion Part One of The Trilogy of Abdul Jalil Ghazal", Banipal Magazine of Modern Arab Literature, no. 32, archived from the original on 2012-03-17.
