= Lamia Makaddam =

Tunisian poet, journalist and translator (born 1971)

- لمياء المقدم
- Born: Sousse, Tunisia
- Occupation: Author

Lamia Makaddam (Arabic: لمياء المقدم) (born 1971 in Sousse) is a Tunisian poet, journalist and translator.

== Biography ==
Lamia Makaddam was born in 1971 in Sousse, Tunisia. She began writing poetry at an early age and, despite having no female mentors in poetry, was encouraged by her family and teachers in her writing. She published her first poem in the leftist newspaper Badil.

She has written two books of poetry, and her work has been translated into English, French, Dutch, and Kurdish. She was awarded the al-Hijara Literary Prize in the Netherlands in 2000.

She has an MA in Arabic language and literature and, in addition to writing, works as a translator. She has lived in the Netherlands for 20 years and currently lives in Amsterdam.

== Awards ==
- al-Hijara Literary Prize, the Netherlands, 2000

== Selected works ==
=== Books of poetry ===
- Intahā hāḏahi al-qaṣīda .. intahā hāḏā al-ḥubb (This poem is done, this love is done), 2015
- Biṭaʻm al-fākiha al-šatwiyya (With the taste of winter fruit), 2007

=== Translations ===
- Anta qulta (You said it), translation of the Dutch novel Jij zegt het, by Connie Palmen

=== Poems translated into English ===
- Two poems ("Poetry was created to solve family problems", "Love makes woman a man and man a woman"), World Literature Today, 2018
- Four poems ("The bread seller", "If I ever wrote poetry", "A short skirt", "Something must break in the end"), Banipal, 2017
- Three poems, Banipal
