= Margaret Obank =

British publisher and writer

- Occupation: Writer

Margaret Obank is a British publisher and writer, noted for her contribution to the dissemination of contemporary Arabic literature in English translation.

== Life ==
Obank was born in Leeds. She studied philosophy and literature at Leeds University and linguistics at Birkbeck College. She worked in teaching and in printing and publishing for many years. Along with her husband, the Iraqi author Samuel Shimon, Obank was a founder of Banipal magazine, a journal devoted to publishing English translations of modern Arabic literature. The first issue of Banipal was published in February 1998, and as of 2022, there have been 75 issues.

Obank has also established:

- the Banipal Trust for Arab Literature (which administers the Banipal Prize for literary translation),
- the Banipal-Arab British Centre Library of Modern Arab Literature, and
- Banipal Books.

Obank is a trustee of the International Prize for Arabic Fiction (IPAF), and she is also involved with the Centre for the Advanced Study of the Arab World.
