= Mahmoud Shukair =

Palestinian writer

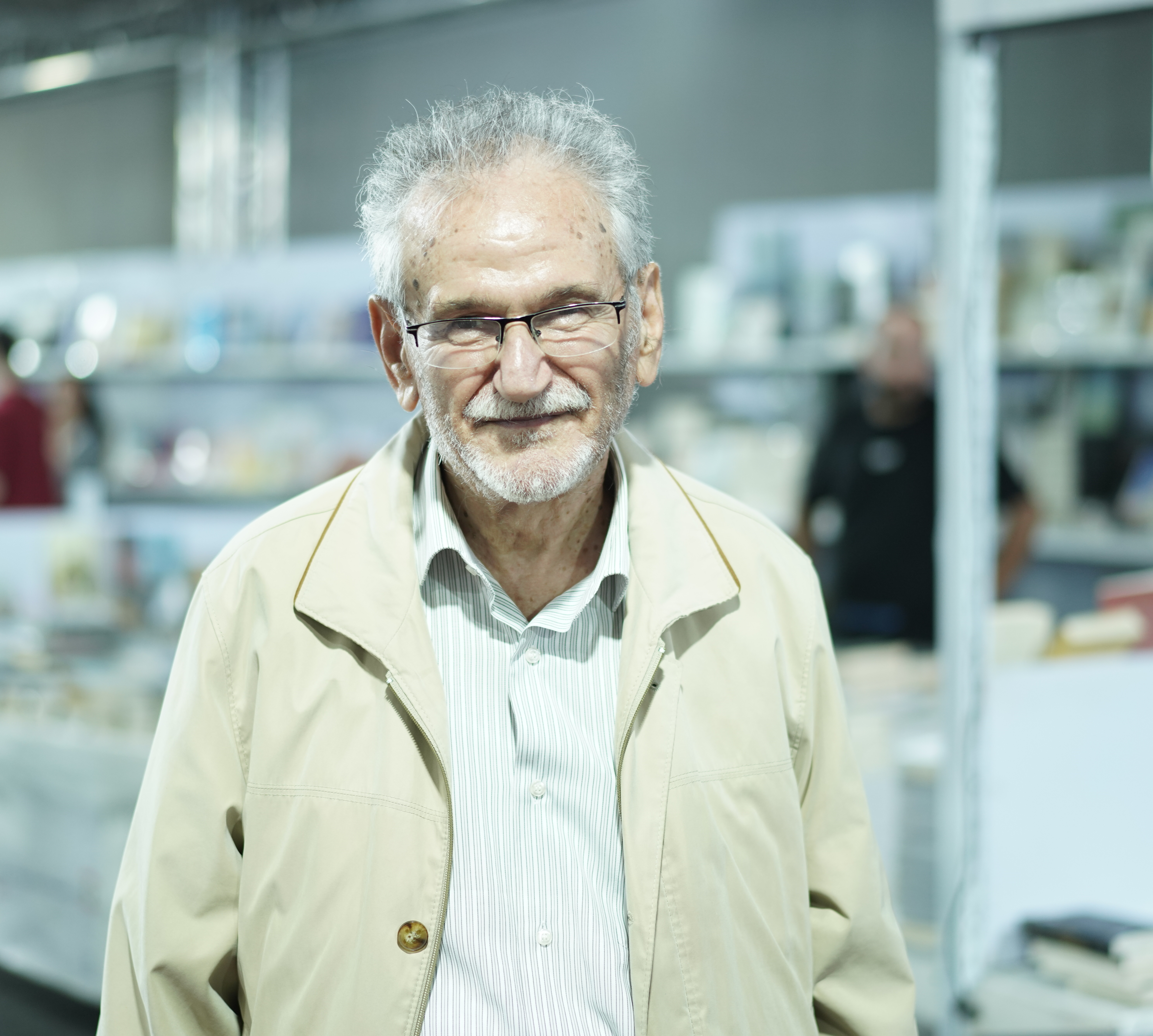
- Shuqayr in Palestine International Book Fair 2023
- Born: 1941 (age 83–84); Jabal al-Mukabbar in Jerusalem
- Occupation: Writer

Mahmoud Shukair (born 1941) is a Palestinian writer. He was born in Jabal al-Mukabbar in Jerusalem during the British Mandate and studied philosophy and sociology at Damascus University in Syria. He was jailed by the Israeli authorities, and was deported to Lebanon in 1975. After living for 18 years in Beirut, Amman and Prague, he returned to Jerusalem in 1993. He worked for years in teaching and journalism, and served as editor-in-chief of the cultural magazines Al-Talia'a (The Vanguard), Dafatir Thaqafiya (Cultural File). He also edited the cultural issues of the journal Sawt al-Watan (Sound of the Homeland). Shukair also occupied positions in the Jordanian Writers' Union, the General Union of Palestinian Writers and Journalists, the Palestinian Community Party, and the Palestinian Ministry of Culture.

His stories have been translated into numerous languages. His 45 books include nine short story collections and 13 books for children. He has also written for television, theatre, and print and online media. In 2011, he was awarded the Mahmoud Darwish Prize for Freedom of Expression. His 2016 novel Praise for the Women of the Family was nominated for the Arabic Booker Prize.
