= Banipal Prize for Arabic Literary Translation =

Literary translation award

Saif Ghobash–Banipal Prize for Arabic Literary Translation
- Awarded for: An outstanding literary translation from Arabic into English.
- Description: Annual award for the published English translation of a full-length literary work from Arabic.
- Sponsored by: Lioudmila Ghobash, Saeed Saif Ghobash, and Maysoune Saif Ghobash
- Country: United Kingdom
- Presented by: Banipal magazine and the Society of Authors
- Established: 2006
- Website: banipaltrust.org.uk/prize

The Banipal Prize, officially the Saif Ghobash–Banipal Prize for Arabic Literary Translation, is an annual award presented to a translator (or translators) for the published English translation of a full-length literary work in Arabic.

The prize was established in 2006 by the literary magazine Banipal, which promotes the dissemination of contemporary Arabic literature through English translations, alongside the Banipal Trust for Arab Literature. It is administered by the Society of Authors in the UK, which also oversees several other literary translation prizes.

The prize is sponsored by Lioudmila Ghobash, Saeed Saif Ghobash and Maysoune Saif Ghobash in memory of HE the late Saif Ghobash.

== Winners and nominees ==
= winner

=== 2006 ===
- Humphrey Davies: Gate of the Sun by Elias Khoury
- Hala Halim: Clamor of the Lake by Mohamed el-Bisatie
- Paul Starkey: Stones of Bobello by Edwar al-Kharrat

Judges: Moris Farhi, Maya Jaggi, Roger Allen

=== 2007 ===
- Farouk Mustafa (pen-name Farouk Abdel Wahab): The Lodging House by Khairy Shalaby
- Marilyn Booth: Thieves in Retirement by Hamdi Abu Golayyel
- Peter Theroux: Saraya, The Ogre’s Daughter by Emile Habiby

Judges: Moris Farhi, Maya Jaggi, Roger Allen

=== 2008 ===
- Fady Joudah: The Butterfly’s Burden by Mahmoud Darwish
- Ghassan Nasr: The Journals of Sarab Affan by Jabra Ibrahim Jabra
- Nancy Roberts: The Man from Bashmour by Salwa Bakr

Judges: Marilyn Booth, Aamer Hussein, Bill Swainson, Roger Allen

=== 2009 ===
- Samah Selim: The Collar and the Bracelet by Yahya Taher Abdullah
- Michelle Hartman: Wild Mulberries by Iman Humaydan Younes
- Elliott Colla: Gold Dust by Ibrahim al-Koni

Judges: Francine Stock, Aamer Hussein, Marilyn Booth, Roger Allen

=== 2010 ===
- Humphrey Davies: Yalo by Elias Khoury
- Humphrey Davies: Sunset Oasis by Bahaa Taher
- Kareem James Abu-Zeid: Cities without Palms by Tarek Etayeb

Judges: Margaret Drabble, Susan Bassnett, Elliott Colla, Yasir Suleiman

=== 2011 ===
- Khaled Mattawa: Selected Poems by Adonis
- Barbara Romaine: Spectres by Radwa Ashour
- Maia Tabet: White Masks by Elias Khoury

Judges: Sarah Churchwell, Joan Smith, Christina Phillips, Samuel Shimon

=== 2012 ===
- Roger Allen: A Muslim Suicide by Bensalem Himmich
- Humphrey Davies: I Was Born There, I Was Born Here by Mourid Barghouti

Judges: Ruth Padel, Esther Freud, Fadhil al-Azzawi, John Peate

=== 2013 ===
- Jonathan Wright: Azazeel by Youssef Ziedan
- William Maynard Hutchins: A Land Without Jasmine by Wajdi al-Ahdal

Judges: Humphrey Davies, Hassan Abdulrazzak, Rajeev Balasubramanyam, Meike Ziervogel

=== 2014 ===
- Sinan Antoon: The Corpse Washer by Sinan Antoon
- Paula Haydar: June Rain by Jabbour Douaihy

Longlist

- The Mehlis Report by Rabee Jaber, trans. Kareem James Abu-Zeid (New Directions)
- The Arch and the Butterfly by Mohammed Achaari, trans. Aida Bamia (Bloomsbury Qatar Foundation Publishing)
- Private Pleasures by Hamdy El-Gazzar, trans. Humphrey Davies (AUC Press)
- Ben Barka Lane by Mahmoud Saeed, trans. Kay Heikkinen (Interlink Publishing Co.)
- Other Lives by Iman Humaydan, trans. Michelle Hartman (Interlink Books)
- Throwing Sparks by Abdo Khal, trans. Maia Tabet and Michael K. Scott (Bloomsbury Qatar Foundation Publishing)
- That Smell by Sonallah Ibrahim, trans. Robyn Creswell (New Directions)
- House of the Wolf by Ezzat El Kamhawi, trans. Nancy Roberts (AUC Press)
- New Waw by Ibrahim al-Koni, trans. William M. Hutchins (University of Texas Press)
- Moon and Henna Tree by Ahmed Toufiq, trans. Roger Allen (University of Texas Press)
- The Bridges of Constantine by Ahlem Mosteghanemi, trans. Raphael Cohen (Bloomsbury)
- Earth Weeps, Saturn Laughs by Abdulaziz al Farsi, trans. Nancy Roberts (AUC Press)
- Gertrude by Hassan Najmi, trans. Roger Allen (Interlink Books)
- Status Emo by Eslam Mosbah, trans. Raphael Cohen (AUC Press)
- The Silence and the Roar by Nihad Sirees, trans. Max Weiss (Pushkin Press)

Judges: Paul Blezard-Gymer, Lulu Norman, Samuel Shimon, Jonathan Wright

=== 2015 ===
- Paul Starkey for The Book of the Sultan's Seal: Strange Incidents from History in the City of Mars by Youssef Rakha
- Land of No Rain by Amjad Nasser, trans. Jonathan Wright

Longlist

- Stealth by Sonallah Ibrahim, trans. Hosam Aboul-Ela (New Directions, USA)
- The Penguin's Song by Hassan Daoud, trans. Marilyn Booth (City Lights Publishers, USA)
- African Titanics by Abu Bakr Khaal, trans. Charis Bredin (Darf Publishers, UK)
- Butterfly Wings by Mohamed Salmawy, trans. Raphael Cohen (The American University in Cairo Press, Egypt/USA)
- Fullblood Arabian by Osama Alomar, trans. C. J. Collins (New Directions, USA)
- The Broken Mirrors: Sinalcol by Elias Khoury, trans. Humphrey Davies (Maclehose Press, UK)
- Diary of a Jewish Muslim by Kamal Ruhayyim, trans. Sarah Enany (The AUC Press, Egypt/USA)
- Who's Afraid of Meryl Streep by Rashid Al-Daif, trans. Paula Haydar and Nadine Sinno (Centre for Middle Eastern Studies, University of Texas at Austin, USA)
- French Perfume by Amir Tag Elsir, trans. William M. Hutchins (Antibookclub, USA)
- Nothing More to Lose by Najwan Darwish, poetry trans. Kareem James Abu-Zeid (NY Books, USA)
- The Iraqi Nights by Dunya Mikhail, poetry trans. Kareem James Abu-Zeid (New Directions, USA)
- The Woman from Tantoura by Radwa Ashour, trans. Kay Heikkinen (The AUC Press, Egypt/USA)
- Dates on my Fingers by Muhshin al-Ramli, trans. Luke Leafgren (The AUC Press, Egypt/USA)
- Oh, Salaam! by Najwa Barakat, trans. Luke Leafgren (Interlink, USA)
- Where Pigeons Don't Fly by Yousef Al-Mohaimeed, trans. Robin Moger (Bloomsbury Qatar Foundation Publishing)
- Women of Karantina by Nael Eltoukhy, trans. Robin Moger (The AUC Press, Egypt/USA)
- The Crocodiles by Youssef Rakha, trans. Robin Moger (Seven Stories Press, USA)
- Days of Ignorance by Laila Aljohani, trans. Nancy Roberts (Bloomsbury, UK/USA)
- Chaos of the Senses by Ahlem Mosteghanemi, trans. Nancy Roberts (Bloomsbury)
- The Lanterns of the King of Galilee by Ibrahim Nasrallah, trans. Nancy Roberts (The AUC Press, Egypt/USA)
- Blue Lorries by Radwa Ashour, trans. Barbara Romaine (Bloomsbury Qatar Foundation Publishing)
- Beirut, Beirut by Sonallah Ibrahim, trans. Chip Rossetti (Bloomsbury Qatar Foundation Publishing)
- The Book of the Sultan's Seal by Youssef Rakha, trans. Paul Starkey (Interlink, USA)
- Monarch of the Square: an Anthology of Mohamed Zafzaf's Short Stories by Mohamed Zafzaf, trans. Mbarek Sryfi and Roger Allen (Syracuse University Press, USA)
- The Chronicles of Majnun Layla and Selected Poems by Qassim Haddad, poetry trans. John Verlenden and Ferial Ghazoul (Syracuse University Press, USA)
- Rain Over Baghdad by Hala el Badry, trans. Farouk Abdel Wahab (The AUC Press, Egypt/USA)
- Land Of No Rain by Amjad Nasser, trans. Jonathan Wright (Bloomsbury Qatar Foundation Publishing)
- Temple Bar by Bahaa Abdelmegid, trans. Jonathan Wright (The AUC Press, Egypt/USA)
- Chewing Gum by Mansour Bushnaf, trans. Mona Zaki (Darf Publishers, UK)

Judges: Robin Ostle, Samira Kawar, Alastair Niven, Susannah Tarbush.

=== 2016 ===
- Jonathan Wright for his translation of the novel The Bamboo Stalk by Saud Alsanousi

Longlist

- Confessions by Rabee Jaber, trans. Kareem James Abu-Zeid (New Directions, USA)
- The Bride of Amman by Fadi Zaghmout, trans. Ruth Ahmedzai Kemp (Signal 8 Press, Hong Kong)
- Desert Sorrows by Tayseer al-Sboul, trans. Nesreen Akhtarkhavari and Anthony A Lee (Michigan State University Press, USA)
- My Torturess by Bensalem Himmich, trans. Roger Allen (Syracuse University Press, USA)
- Hurma by Ali al-Muqri, trans. T. M. Aplin (Darf Publishers, UK)
- Ebola '76 by Amir Tag Elsir, trans. Charis Bredin and Emily Danby (Darf Publishers, UK)
- 32 by Sahar Mandour, trans. Nicole Fares (Syracuse University Press, USA)
- The Automobile Club of Egypt by Alaa Al Aswany, trans. Russell Harris (Canongate, UK)
- Ali and his Russian Mother by Alexandra Chreiteh, trans. Michelle Hartman (Interlink Publishing, USA)
- Telepathy by Amir Tag Elsir, trans. William M. Hutchins (Bloomsbury Qatar Foundation Publishing, Qatar)
- The Scarecrow by Ibrahim al-Koni, trans. William M. Hutchins (CMES, University of Texas at Austin, USA)
- A Portal in Space by Mahmoud Saeed, trans. William M. Hutchins (CMES, University of Texas at Austin, USA)
- All Faces but Mine by Samih al-Qasim, trans. Abdulwahid Lu'lu'a (Syracuse University Press, USA)
- Mortal Designs by Reem Bassiouney, trans. Melanie Magidow (AUC Press, Egypt/USA)
- The Dust of Promises by Ahlem Mostaghanemi, trans. Nancy Roberts (Bloomsbury Publishing, UK)
- Whitefly by Abdelilah Hamdouchi, trans. Jonathan Smolin (Hoopoe Fiction, Egypt/USA)
- The Holy Sail by Abdulaziz al-Mahmoud, trans. Karim Traboulsi (Bloomsbury Qatar Foundation Publishing, Qatar)
- The Bamboo Stalk by Saud Alsanousi, trans. Jonathan Wright (Bloomsbury Qatar Foundation Publishing, Qatar)
- The Televangelist by Ibrahim Essa, trans. Jonathan Wright (Hoopoe Fiction, Egypt/USA)

Judges: Paul Starkey, Lucy Popescu, Zahia Smail Salhi, Bill Swainson,

=== 2017 ===
- Robin Moger for The Book of Safety by Yasser Abdel Hafez
- The Dove's Necklace by Raja Alem, trans. Katharine Halls and Adam Talib (Duckworth)
- No Knives in the Kitchens of This City by Khaled Khalifa, trans. Leri Price (Hoopoe)
- Limbo Beirut by Hilal Chouman, trans. Anna Ziajka Stanton (Center for Middle Eastern Studies, Univ. Texas Press)

Judges: Alastair Niven, Peter Kalu, Wen-chin Ouyang, Salam Sarhan.

=== 2018 ===
- The President's Gardens by Muhsin Al-Ramli, tr. Luke Leafgren (MacLehose Press/Quercus)
- Concerto al-Quds by Adonis, tr. Khaled Mattawa (Yale University Press)
- Frankenstein in Baghdad by Ahmed Saadawi, tr. Jonathan Wright (Oneworld)
- Using Life by Ahmed Naji, tr. Ben Koerber (CMES Publications, UT Austin)

==== Longlist ====
- In Jerusalem and Other Poems by Tamim al-Barghouti, translated by Radwa Ashour, Tamim al-Barghouti, Ahdaf Soueif (Interlink Books)
- No Road to Paradise by Hassan Daoud, translated by Marilyn Booth (Hoopoe Fiction, AUC Press)
- Divine Names by Luay Abdul-Ilah, translated by Judy Cumberbatch (Mira Publishing)
- Hend and the Soldiers by Badriah Albeshr, translated by Sanna Dhahir (CMES Publications, Univ Texas at Austin)
- The American Quarter by Jabbour Douaihy, translated by Paula Haydar (Interlink Books)
- The Apartment in Bab el-Louk by Donia Maher (with illustrations by Ganzeer and Ahmad Nady), translated by Elisabeth Jaquette (Darf Publishers)
- Suslov's Daughter by Habib Abdulrab Sarori, translated by Elisabeth Jaquette (Darf Publishers)
- Tales of Yusuf Tadrus by Adel Esmat, translated by Mandy McClure (AUC Press)
- All The Battles by Maan Abu Taleb, translated by Robin Moger (Hoopoe Fiction, AUC Press)
- Embrace on Brooklyn Bridge by Ezzedine C. Fishere, translated by John Peate (AUC Press)
- Gaza Weddings by Ibrahim Nasrallah, translated by Nancy Roberts (Hoopoe Fiction, AUC Press)
- Farewell, Damascus by Ghada Samman, translated by Nancy Roberts (Darf Publishers)
- Bled Dry by Abdelilah Hamdouchi, translated by Benjamin Smith (Hoopoe Fiction, AUC Press)
- The Blueness of the Evening: Selected Poems of Hassan Najmi by Hassan Najmi, translated by Mbarek Sryfi and Eric Sellin (University of Arkansas Press)
- Fractured Destinies by Rabai al-Madhoun, translated by Paul Starkey (Hoopoe Fiction, AUC Press)
- The Baghdad Eucharist by Sinan Antoon, translated by Maia Tabet (Hoopoe Fiction, AUC Press)

Judges: Pete Ayrton, Georgia de Chamberet, Fadia Faqir and Sophia Vasalou.

=== 2019 ===
- Death is Hard Work by Khaled Khalifa, translated by Leri Price (Faber & Faber)
- Celestial Bodies by Jokha Alharthi, translated by Marilyn Booth (Sandstone Press)
- My Name is Adam: Children of the Ghetto Volume 1 by Elias Khoury, translated by Humphrey Davies (MacLehose Press)
- Jokes for the Gunman by Mazen Maarouf, translated by Jonathan Wright (Granta Books)

Judges: Ghazi Gheblawi (chair), Dr Jan Fortune, Abla Oudeh, Catherine Taylor.

=== 2021 ===
The shortlist was announced on 24 November 2021. The jury consisted of Roger Allen (Chair), Rosemarie Hudson, Ronak Hosni, and Caroline McCormick. The winner was announced on 12 January 2022.

- Voices of the Lost by Hoda Barakat (Oneworld) translated by Marilyn Booth [Lebanon]
- The Girl with Braided Hair by Rasha Adly (Hoopoe Fiction), translated by Sarah Enany [Egypt]
- A Bed for the King’s Daughter by Shahla Ujayli (Center for Middle Eastern Studies/University of Texas Press), translated by Sawad Hussain (Syria)\
- The Frightened Ones by Dima Wannous (Harvill Secker), translated by Elisabeth Jaquette (Syria)
- God99 by Hassan Blasim (Comma Press), translated by Jonathan Wright

=== 2022 ===
The shortlist was announced on 1 December 2022. The jury consisted of Charis Olszok (chair), Susheila Nasta, Katharine Halls, and Becki Maddock. The winners were announced on 12 January 2023.

- (joint winner) Mohamed Kheir, Slipping (Two Lines Press, 2018) translated by Robin Moger [Egypt]
- (joint winner) Hamdi Abu Golayyel, The Men Who Swallowed the Sun (American University in Cairo/Hoopoe Books) translated by Humphrey Davies [Egypt]
- Yassin Adnan, Hot Maroc (Syracuse University Press) translated by Alexander E. Elinson [Morocco]

=== 2023 ===
The shortlist was announced on 1 December 2023, with the jury consisting of Ros Schwartz (chair), Tony Calderbank, Sarah Enany, and Barbara Schwepcke.

- Najwa Barakat, Mister N (And Other Stories, 2022) translated by Luke Leafgren [Lebanon]
- Sonallah Ibrahim, The Turban and the Hat (Seagull Books, 2022) translated by Bruce Fudge [Egypt]
- Jabbour Douaihy, Firefly (Seagull Books, 2022) translated by Paula Haydar and Nadine Sinno [Lebanon]
- Jabbour Douaihy, The King of India (Interlink Books, 2022) translated by Paula Haydar [Lebanon]
- Bushra al-Maqtari, What Have You Left Behind? (Fitzcarraldo Editions, 2022) translated by Sawad Hussain [Yemen]
- Sonia Nimr, Thunderbird (University of Texas Press, 2022) translated by M Lynx Qualey [Palestine]

=== 2024 ===
- Before the Queen Falls Asleep by Huzama Habayeb, translated by Kay Heikkinen, published by MacLehose Press, 2024
- Edo’s Souls by Stella Gaitano, translated by Sawad Hussain, published by Dedalus, 2023
- Lost in Mecca by Bothayna Al-Essa, translated by Nada Faris, published by Dar Arab for Publishing and Translation, 2024
- Rotten Evidence by Ahmed Naji, translated by Katharine Halls, published by McSweeney's, 2023
- Traces of Enayat by Iman Mersal, translated by Robin Moger, published by And Other Stories, 2023
- Yoghurt and Jam (or How My Mother Became Lebanese) by Lena Merhej, translated by Nadiyah Abdullatif and Anam Zafar, published by Balestier Press, 2023

== See also ==
- Scott Moncrieff Prize
- List of Arabic-English translators
- The Banipal Prize – official website
