= Dar El Shorouk =

Arabic publishing house

- Status: Cooperative
- Founded: 1968; 58 years ago
- Country of origin: Egypt
- Headquarters location: Cairo
- Key people: Ibrahim el-Moallem (Editorial Director)
- No. of employees: 100
- Official website: www.shorouk.com

Dar El Shorouk (Arabic: دار الشروق) is an Arabic publishing house based in Beirut and Cairo. It publishes books in politics, biographies, memoirs, history, philosophy, social sciences, religion, nationalist thought, and art as well as children's books.

== History ==
Muhammad al-Mu'allem (1918 - 1994) established Dar El Shorouk in 1968, crowning a career in publishing that began in the early 1940s with a simplified science book written by the physicist Ali Moustafa Mosharafa until the company's nationalization in 1966. He started the venture with Ibrahim al-Mu'allem in Cairo and Beirut.

The administration is composed of Ibrahim El Mu'allem, president; the engineer Aadel al-Mu'allem, vice president; Ahmed az-Ziadi, general director of publishing; Amira Abulmajd, director of children's book publishing; and Helmi at-Touni, artistic director.

Dar El Shorouk employs approximately 1200 staff members—directors, engineers, editors, artists, administrators, and workers. Dar El Shorouk has a wide distribution network with agencies in most parts of the world, and a number of offices in Cairo and Beirut.

== Cultural activities ==
Dar El Shorouk is considered the first Egyptian publishing house to have participated in the Frankfurt Book Fair and the Bologna Children's Book Fair.

== Publications ==
Dar El Shorouk publishes a number of Arab writers including Naguib Mahfouz, Mohamed Hassanein Heikal, Ahmed Zewail, Tharwat Okasha, Zaki Naguib Mahmoud, Tawfiq al-Hakim, Mohammed al-Ghazali, Yusuf Idris, Yusuf al-Qaradawi, Mahmud Shaltut, Salah Abdel Sabour, Anis Mansour, Fahmi Huwaidi, Ahmed Bahgat, Rajaa an-Niqaash, Muhammad Salmawi, Abdel Wahab El-Messiri, Radwa Ashour, Mourid Barghouti, Tamim al-Barghouti, Farouk Gouida, Gamal El-Ghitani, Galal Amin, Ibrahim Aslan, Ahmed Khaled Tawfik, Alaa Al Aswany, Ahmed Mourad, Muhammad Sayyid Tantawy, Abd al-Wahhab Al-Bayati, Muhammad Imara, Mohamed Makhzangi, Ibrahim Abdel Meguid, Boutros Boutros-Ghali, Ahmed Asmat Abdel-Meguid, Mohammad Salim Al-Awa, Tarek El-Bishry, Ahmad Fathi Sorour, Radwa El Aswad and others.

Dar El Shorouk also publishes works translated into Arabic.
