= Mosbah =

Mosbah (Arabic: مصباح) may refer to:

- Mosbah Sanaï (born 1991), Tunisian handball player
- Eslam Mosbah (born 1984), Egyptian novelist
- Mosad Mosbah (born 1957), Egyptian weightlifter
- Saadia Mosbah (born 1960), Tunisian human rights activist
- Sabri Mosbah (born 1982), Tunisian singer, composer and guitarist
