= Robin Moger =

South African translator

Robin Moger is a British translator of Arabic literature. His translations include:

- Ahmed Mourad - Vertigo
- Hamdi Abu Golayel - A Dog With No Tail
- Maan Abu Taleb - All The Battles
- Mohammad Rabie - Otared
- Nael Eltoukhy - Women of Karantina
- Yasser Abdel Hafez - The Book of Safety
- Yousef Al-Mohaimeed - Where Pigeons Don't Fly
- Youssef Rakha - The Crocodiles

He won the 2017 Banipal Prize for his translation of The Book of Safety by Yasser Abdel Hafez. He lives in Cape Town.
