= Hamdi Abu Golayyel =

Egyptian writer

Hamdi Abu Golayyel (Arabic: حمدي أبوجليل; 1968 – 12 June 2023) was an Egyptian writer. The author of several novels and collections of short stories, he is known as one of the new voices in Egyptian fiction. Among other awards, he won the Banipal Prize for Arabic Literary Translation in 2022. The literary magazine ArabLit called him a "chronicler of the lives of Egypt’s marginalized and working-class."

== Life and career ==
Abu Golayyel was born in 1968 in a Bedouin village in the Fayoum region. His ancestors arrived from Libya in the early 19th century to settle in Fayoum. Abu Golayyel migrated to Cairo in the early 1980s, and worked as a construction labourer on building sites. These experiences later provided material for his literary writings.

His first book was a collection of short stories published in 1997 under the title Swarm of Bees. His second collection Items Folded with Great Care, released in 2000, won several literary awards. These stories deal with the author’s Bedouin heritage, written in a sarcastic style, close to everyday conversation. Other short stories were published in 2010 as Tayy El Khiyaam (Folding the Tents).

Abu Golayyel received further acclaim with his novel Thieves in Retirement, originally published by Merit Publishing House in Cairo, and later by Syracuse University Press in an English translation by Marilyn Booth. The story takes place in an overpopulated building in Cairo and with tenants representing a "cross-section of Egyptian society, while highlighting a modern sense of displacement and urban alienation."

His 2009 novel A Dog with No Tail won the Naguib Mahfouz Medal, and an English translation by Robin Moger was released by AUC Press. His next novel The Men Who Swallowed the Sun, translated by Humphrey Davies, won the 2022 Banipal Prize for Arabic Literary Translation. His last novel was My Mother’s Rooster, published posthumously in 2024.

Abu Golayyel worked as editor-in-chief of the “Popular Studies" series in folklore research for the Egyptian Ministry of Culture. He also contributed regularly to Arabic newspapers, such as al-Ittihad and al-Safir. He was married with children and lived in Cairo.

== See also ==
- Egyptian literature in the 21st century
