= Hamdouchi =

Hamdouchi is an Arabic surname. Notable people with the surname include:

- Abdelilah Hamdouchi (born 1958), Moroccan writer
- Hichem Hamdouchi (born 1972), Moroccan-French chess grandmaster
- Adina-Maria Hamdouchi (born 1979), French chess player
