= Ahmed Naji =

Egyptian novelist

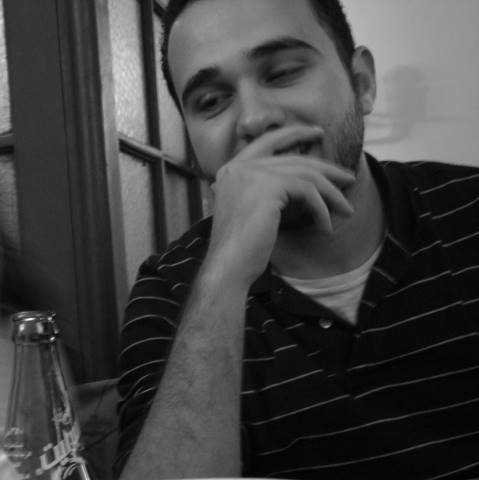
- Born: 15 September 1985 (age 40); Mansoura, Egypt
- Occupation: Journalist
- Children: 2
- Writing career
- Language: Arabic, English
- Notable awards: Dubai Press Club Award, PEN/Barbey Freedom to Write Award, Open Eye Award, The Saif Ghobash Banipal Prize for Arabic Literary Translation
- Website: ahmednaji.net

Ahmed Naji (born 15 September 1985) (Arabic: أحمد ناجي) is an Egyptian journalist and literary novelist. He was born in Mansoura. He has written numerous journalistic and critical articles and several books, including The Use of Life (2014), which resulted in his being jailed in Egypt in 2016 for "violating public modesty," due to its sexual content and drug references, marking the first time in modern Egypt that an author has been jailed for a work of literature.

He served almost 300 days in jail before being released, and later was given the PEN/Barbey Freedom to Write Award by PEN America. He moved to Washington, D.C. with his wife, and was a City of Asylum Fellow at the UNLV Black Mountain Institute in Las Vegas, Nevada, from 2019 to 2023. Naji was a regular contributor to Al-Akhbar al-Adab and Al-Masry Al-Youm, among other publications.

== Early life ==
Ahmed Naji was born on September 15, 1985, in Mansoura, Egypt. Growing up, he had been fascinated with comics or books for kids and teenagers. He found a passion for writing at the young age of 10 but knew how dangerous censorship laws could be while living in Egypt. He worked as a journalist in Mansoura and wrote his first book, Rogers, in 2007.

== Career ==
Naji has published four books: Rogers (2007), Seven Lessons Learned from Ahmed Makky (2009), The Use of Life (2014), and Rotten Evidence: Reading and Writing in an Egyptian Prison (2023). He has published dozens of opinion articles and reports in various print and online publications and blogs. He worked as a journalist for the literary magazine Akhbar Al-Adab and contributed to numerous magazines and websites including Al-Masry al-Youm and Al-Modon.

His work is considered controversial, particularly for Egyptian social and political contexts, and is seen by some as pushing against conservative cultural boundaries.

In 2015, Naji ran into legal trouble after a chapter of his novel The Use of Life was published in Akhbar Al-Adab. In 2016, he was fined by a higher court and imprisoned on the accusation that the book violated public modesty by including sexual references and references to intoxicants, which are highly taboo in Egypt. After spending 300 days in jail, he was released on December 22, 2016. He is known as the first Egyptian writer imprisoned on account of immorality. The Use of Life has since been translated into English by Ben Koerber.

After his conviction, his case became known around the world and has increased awareness and sales of his books. The rise in knowledge of his trial increased support for his freedom, causing many to push for his release. After his spending years in and out of court, Naji's remaining jail time was replaced by a fine and his travel ban was lifted in July 2018. He was allowed to leave Cairo in 2019. Since then, Naji traveled to America to reunite with his wife Yasmin Hosam El Din after a year apart. Since leaving Egypt, Naji has told reporters that he now feels he can think freely and reexamine what has happened to him.

Although Naji has expressed feelings of relative freedom in America, he considers that there are still many unanswered questions for him, such as if he will stay in America, will he write for American or Egyptian audiences, and how will he continue as an exiled writer. While he is optimistic about his new life in America, he knows that these questions will need to be answered at some point. While the future is uncertain for Naji and his family, they are remaining positive, with his wife saying "there's nothing more thrilling for me than new beginnings".

== Political views ==
Naji is known for writing criticism exploring trends in Egyptian pop culture, beginning with his blogs in the early 2000s. He has been described as "iconoclastic." While Naji does tend to have writing that is considered controversial in Egypt, his writings oftentimes don't mention politics, but instead provoke protests and revolutions. For example, in his book Using Life Naji rarely mentions the politics in Egypt, but instead talks of how the revolution in 2011 didn't cause much political or social change.

== Legacy and awards ==
Naji received most of his praise once his trial was known around the world.

After awarding Naji the PEN/Barbey Freedom to Write Award in 2016 at their annual Literary Gala in New York, PEN America sent a letter signed by over 120 writers to Egyptian President Abdel Fattah el-Sisi, demanding Naji be released from prison. Between these two events, an International Day of Reading for Ahmed Naji was started in May 2016 to further push for his release. Although Naji was not appreciated by the Egyptian government, he had the support of many writers both near and far throughout his trial against the government.

Other awards include: the Dubai Press Club Arab Journalism Award, United Arab Emirates, 2012 for best culture article. The Open Eye Award, Germany, 2016, and AFAC grants, 2018. His novel Using Life was shortlisted by the Neukom Institute Literary Arts Awards in 2018 in the category "Tales of a Fantastic Future", and was shortlisted for the Saif Ghobash Banipal Prize for Arabic Literary Translation, 2019.
