= East of the Palm =

Novel by Bahaa Taher

- Author: Bahaa Taher
- Language: Arabic
- Genre: Novel
- Publication date: 1985
- Publication place: Egypt

East of the Palm is Bahaa Taher's first novel work, he is an Egyptian novelist who is considered one of the most important Arab novelists. East of the Palm novel was Published in 1985.

== Brief ==
The novel is discussing in a narrative and a dialogue manner of people's issues in the sense of social narrative and an approach to the realistic narrative in its dive into societal and political issues, East of the Palm stands on the limits of this form in addressing the upper Egypt community of the level and on the societal description of Egyptian society in general, without historical factual limitation, In some of its scenes, it retreats to record realism with direct or indirect monitoring of customary detailed or daily life realities. The novel explores an important social aspect, namely, university students' relationship with one another, and the reflection of the pulse of the university street on public issues, and the formation of their general mood after The June War (Six-Day War), based on anxiety, enthusiasm, loss of balance and mistrust.

This work depicts the movement of society and individuals together to end this frustration once and for all, where one of the protagonists dreaming of a group confrontation to the injustice, saying: "Perhaps if we stood four, we would become ten, and then one hundred."

=== The issue of Palestine in the novel ===
- The author retells the story of Palestine through a Palestinian student and an Egyptian student. Although the story is recounted, briefly, and with some kind of joke among the characters, it reveals the author's view of the personal perception of this historical event, not without political self-criticism regarding the issue of Palestine. (page 127)
- Tahir embodies in his novel a deep sense of the first Arab issue, which is the loss of Palestine, and he does not directly describe it, but rather symbolizes it, thereby giving this vision the characteristic of majestic in a non-direct or preaching way.
