= Barbara Romaine =

Barbara Romaine (born 1959) is an academic and translator of Arabic literature. From 2008 to 2021 she taught in the Department of Global Interdisciplinary Studies at Villanova University, where she also edited a periodical, Writing in Tongues: A Global Interdisciplinary Journal. Romaine has translated a number of literary works from Arabic to English. These include:

- Aunt Safiyya and the Monastery by Bahaa Taher (University of California Press, 1996)
- Siraaj by Radwa Ashour (University of Texas Press, 2007)
- Spectres by Radwa Ashour (Interlink Books, 2011), runner-up for Saif Ghobash-Banipal Prize for Arabic Literary Translation
- Blue Lorries (original title in Arabic, Farag) by Radwa Ashour (Bloomsbury Qatar Foundation Publishing, 2014)
- A Cloudy Day on the Western Shore by Mohamed Mansi Qandil (Syracuse University Press, 2018)
- Waiting for the Past (original title in Arabic, What Will Come) by Hadiya Hussein (Syracuse University Press, 2022)
- Sand-Catcher by Omar Khalifah (Coffee House Press, 2024), winner of the National Translation Award in prose for 2025; short-listed for Saif Ghobash-Banipal Prize for Arabic Literary Translation

== Biography ==
Romaine trained as a classicist. In 1987 she was sent to Egypt to research Roman sites in and around the city of Alexandria. Fascinated by the Arabic language, over the next six years she attended university extension classes, two intensive (full-immersion) summers at Middlebury College, and a year on fellowship at the American University in Cairo (1992-1993). She taught Arabic at the College of William and Mary from 1993 to 1996; she has since taught at Middlebury College, the University of Pennsylvania, Washington College, Swarthmore College, Princeton University, and Villanova University, among other institutions.

Romaine won a National Endowment for the Arts fellowship in 2007 to facilitate her translation of Spectres and was named runner-up for the 2011 Banipal Prize for the same book. She was awarded a second NEA fellowship for 2015, to support the translation of A Cloudy Day on the Western Shore.

Romaine has also published a number of shorter translations, including short stories and selections from Abbasid poetry, in such literary journals as The St. Petersburg Review, Metamorphoses, and Pusteblume. She contributed to Darwish: Poems (Everyman’s Library Pocket Poets series, 2026) selections from the poetry of Mahmoud Darwish that had never previously been published in English translation.

In 2018, Romaine published Write Arabic Now!: A Handwriting Workbook for Letters and Words (including handwritten models for Arabic script by Lana Iskandarani), with Georgetown University Press.

In 2022, Romaine served as adjunct faculty at New York University, in the capacity of thesis reviewer for NYU’s Master’s in Translation & Interpretation program.

== See also ==
- List of Arabic-English translators
