= Sahar Tawfiq =

Egyptian writer

Sahar Tawfiq (Arabic: سحر توفيق; born 1951) is an Egyptian novelist, short story writer and translator. Born and raised in Cairo, she studied Arabic language and literature at Al-Azhar University. She has worked as a teacher and educationist in both Egypt and Saudi Arabia.

Her first published work was a short story in an Egyptian weekly in 1971. Her first collection of stories An Tanhadera ash-Shams (That the Sun May Descend; 1984) was well received. After a long hiatus, her next book, a novel called Ta'am ez-Zaitoun (The Taste of Olives), came out in 2000. Since then she has published more works of fiction. She has also translated works from English into Arabic, including books by Margaret Atwood, Ishmael Beah, Doris Lessing and Maxine Hong Kingston.

Sahar Tawfiq's work has appeared in Banipal magazine. Points of the Compass, a volume of her short stories translated by Marilyn Booth, won the Arkansas Arabic Translation Award in 1994.

She was married to the late sculptor Adel al-Sharqawi. She lives in Maadi, Cairo.
