= Hassan Najmi =

Moroccan poet

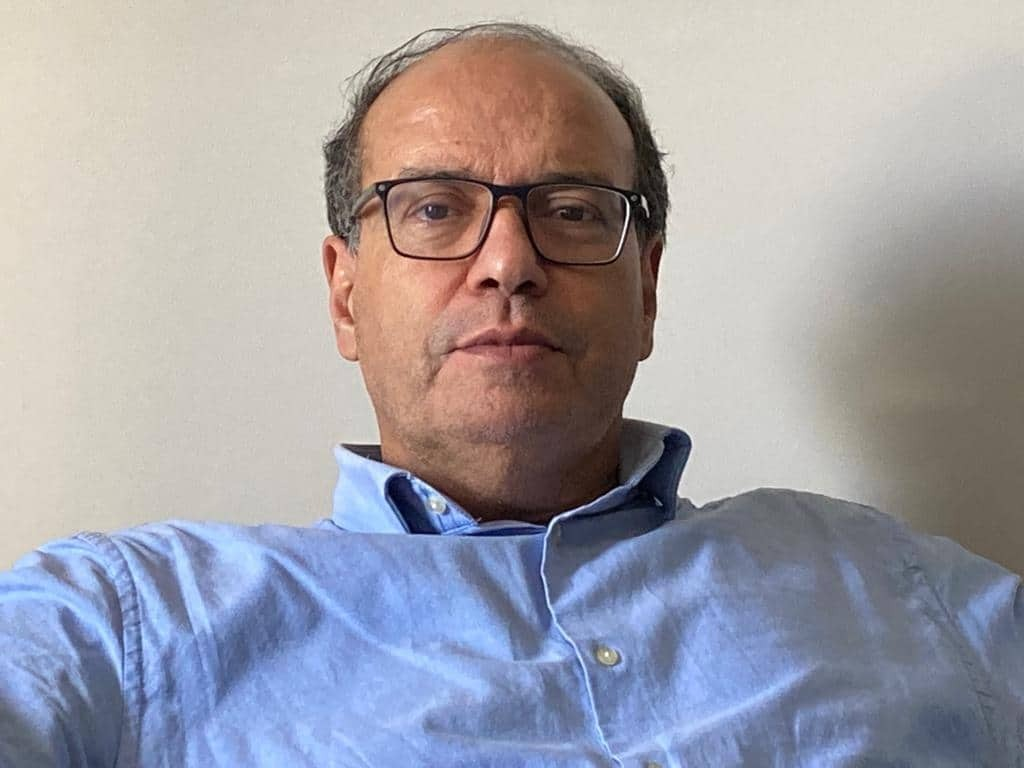
Hassan Najmi

Hassan Najmi (born March 7, 1960) is a Moroccan poet. He was born in Ben Ahmed.

His first book of poems Lavenders’ Princedom came out in 1982. Although his early work shows the influence of poets such as Ahmed Mejjati, Mohammed Serghini and Abdelkarim Tabbal, his poetry has since evolved along its own path.

He is President of the Union of Moroccan Writers (1998–2005).

A selection of his poetry has been translated into English by Mbarek Sryfi and Eric Sellin under the title The Blueness of the Evening: Selected Poems of Hassan Najmi. His novel Gertrude has also been translated by Roger Allen.

== See also ==
- Modern Arabic literature
- Moroccan literature
- Arabic poetry
