= Abu Bakr Khaal =

Eritrean writer

Abu Bakr Hamid Khaal is an Eritrean writer. He is best known for his 2008 novel African Titanics which was translated into English by Charis Bredin. He has written a couple of other books, e.g. The Scent of Arms and Barkantiyya: Land of the Wise Woman.

A member of the Eritrean Liberation Front who fought against the Ethiopian government, Khaal also lived in Libya for many years before moving to Denmark.

== Awards ==
- Banipal Prize for Arabic Literary Translation (2015)
