= Najwa Barakat =

Lebanese Arab novelist, journalist and film director

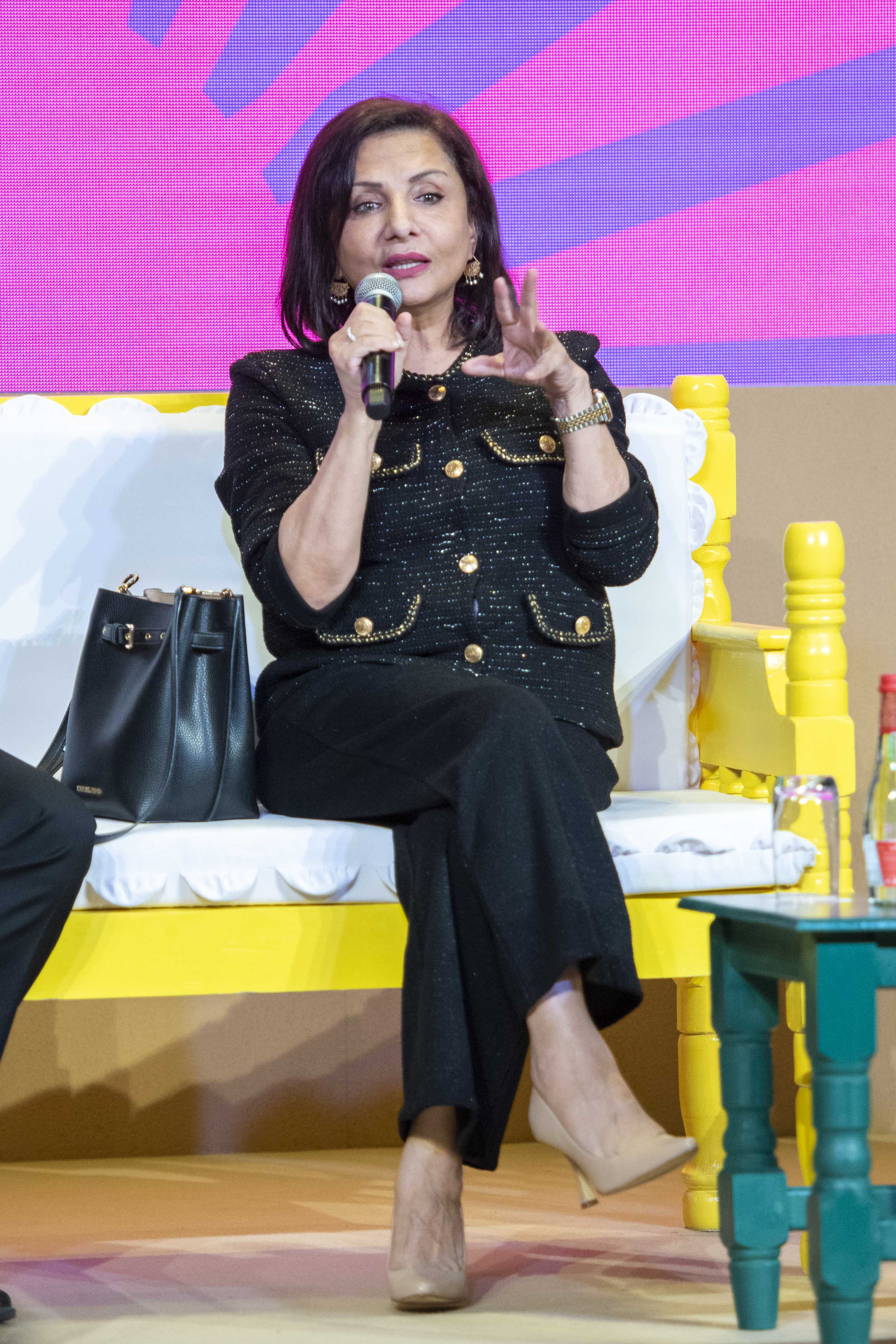
- Najwa Barakat
- Born: 1966 (age 59–60); Lebanon
- Occupation: Novelist

Najwa Barakat (Arabic: نجوى بركات; born 1966, in Beirut) is a Lebanese Arab novelist, journalist and film director.

== Career ==
After achieving studies in theater (Beirut Fine Arts Institute) and cinema (French cinema Institution), she moves definitely to Paris where she works as a freelance journalist in a number of Arabic newspapers and magazines, and gathered the materials for several cultural programs produced by Radio France Internationale (RFI) and the British Broadcasting Corporation (BBC). She also prepared the first fifteen episodes of the cultural program broadcast at Aljaz, and authored several movie scripts as well as directing several documentaries.

Najwa Barakat has published six novels (five in Arabic and one in French), most of which were published by Dar al-Adab in Beirut. Some of them have obtained awards and were translated into foreign languages, among which “The bus of good people” (1996), which received the "Prize of the best literary creation of the year", by the Lebanese Cultural Forum, Paris, in 1997, and was translated into French in 2002, under the title: "Le bus des gens bien" - Stock Publisher (La Cosmoplite). The novel in French, "La locataire du Pot de fer" (the tenant), published by L’Harmattan Publisher in Paris, played on theater in France, "Winner of the First Prize" at the Amateur Theatre Festival in Amiens, France . She also translated Les Carnets de Camus I – II – III into Arabic, published by Kalima and Dar Al-Adab, Summer 2010.

In 2003, the circuit Middle East- Goethe Institute choose her among several Lebanese writers to represent her country in the MIDAD Project: city's teller.

In 2005, Barakat set up the "Mohtaraf" workshop, which in 2009 became an ongoing series in Beirut for young and aspiring writers. Extensions of the workshop have also been held in Manama and Dubai. Several participants have gone on to publish and win literary awards, including Rasha Atrash, Hilal Chouman, Rana Najjar and Muneera Swar.

== Works ==
- The Secret Language (loughat al-sirr)
- Oh, Salaam (Ya-Salâm)
- The Tenant
- The Bus of Good People (Bâs el-awâdem)
- The Life and Passion of Hamad (hayât wa alâm Hamad ibn Siléneh)
- The Transformer (Al-muhawwel)
- Mr. N (Mistir nūn)
- The Absence of Mai (Ghaybat Mayy)

=== Awards ===
2015, Philippe Vigreux's French translation of The Language of Secrets was shortlisted for Prix de la Litterature Arabe

2023, Luke Leafgren's English translation Mr. N won the Banipal Prize for Arabic Literary Translation and was shortlisted for EBRD Literature Prize

2026, The Absence of Mai was shortlisted for the International Prize for Arabic Fiction
