= Ghassan Nasr =

Ghassan Nasr is an academic and translator. He obtained an MFA from the University of Arkansas. He also obtained an MA and a PhD from Indiana University. He is currently an assistant professor in the English department at DePauw University. Nasr is the translator of The Journals of Sarab Affan by Jabra Ibrahim Jabra. This translation was runner-up for the 2008 Banipal Prize for Arabic Literary Translation. He has also translated the poetry of Saudi poet Fowziyah Abu-Khalid.

== See also ==
- List of Arabic-to-English translators
