= The Baghdad Eucharist =

2012 novel by Sinan Antoon

- First edition cover
- Author: Sinan Antoon
- Original title: يا مريم
- Translator: Maia Tabet
- Language: English
- Publisher: Hoopoe Fiction
- Publication date: 2017
- Publication place: Egypt
- Pages: 129
- ISBN: 978-977-416-820-8

The Baghdad Eucharist is the third novel of the Iraqi author Sinan Antoon and was originally published in Arabic in 2012 as Ya Maryam (Arabic: يا مريم). The English translation by Maia Tabet was published in 2017 by Hoopoe, an imprint of the American University in Cairo Press (AUC Press). The novel has also been translated into Spanish (2014) and Persian (2019). In 2013, the novel was shortlisted for the International Prize for Arabic Fiction. The Baghdad Eucharist follows the fate of a Christian family in Iraq, deeply scarred by the Iraqi diaspora, and centers on Youssef, a septuagenarian, and his niece Maha, a woman in her twenties. Their contrasting perspectives on history and present offer a dual lens on early twenty-first-century Iraqi society, revealing how violent sectarianism exacts its toll both within one family and across the broader national fabric.

== Major characters ==
=== Youssef ===
Youssef Bharatli is a retired man in his seventies, living in a large, old family house in Baghdad's Karrada district. He was born in 1933 into a Chaldean Christian family and grew up with eight siblings. Youssef spent his entire career working for the Iraqi Date Palm Authority, remained unmarried and has no children. The events of the story take place in 2010, during the aftermath of the Iraq War and Youssef is the only sibling still remaining in Iraq; his brothers and sisters have died or emigrated to find a safer place since the beginning of the Gulf War in 1990. Youssef refused to leave and now spends his days doing chores around the house while reminiscing the Iraq of his youth: a pluralistic, mostly secular nation marked by peaceful coexistence of the different religious communities.

=== Maha ===
Maha George is a woman in her early twenties who grew up in a Christian family in the Dora district in southwest Baghdad. In the summer of 2007, Maha and her family moved to eastern Baghdad because Muslim extremist groups forced all the Christians from the Dora district to convert to Islam or pay the jizya. A few months later, Maha's family moved to Ankawa in Iraqi Kurdistan, but Maha has stayed in Baghdad to finish her education to become a doctor. In the meantime, she married Luay and they moved back to Maha's family house in the Dora district, because unrest and violence in Baghdad had eased and increasing numbers of Christians were returning. Maha became pregnant, but following the explosion of two cars next to their house one night, she suffered a miscarriage due to the shock. Losing her unborn son has left Maha traumatized and has drawn her closer to her faith. After the miscarriage, Maha and Luay moved into the upper floor of Youssef's house. They plan to live there until Maha completes her studies, after which they want to emigrate to Canada.

== Plot ==
The story begins on the evening of Saturday, 30 October 2010, following a heated debate between Youssef and Maha about the status of Christians in Iraq and the rise of sectarianism: "'You're just living in the past, Uncle!' Maha burst out as she ran from the living room after our argument." Maha accuses Youssef of failing to recognize the precarious situation of Christians in Iraq and of underestimating the growing threat of Muslim extremist violence against them. The next morning, Youssef keeps thinking about his discussion with Maha and recalls memories of Hinna, his deeply religious sister who had stayed with him in the family house in Baghdad and passed away exactly seven years ago.

The second chapter explores Youssef's childhood in the relatively peaceful and prosperous Iraq of the 1950s, although the sudden emigration of a Jewish friend reveals that society was not as harmonious as it seemed. The chapter also highlights Youssef's successful career with the Iraqi Date Palm Authority, reflects on two women he once fell in love with, and briefly outlines what became of each of his siblings. All this is told through photographs hanging in the reception lounge of the family house.

Youssef pays a visit to Saadoun, his only remaining friend. They talk about his disagreement with Maha and the growing tide of sectarian violence in Iraq. Saadoun manages to convince Youssef that things have changed compared to the past: " 'We've always had Sunnis and Shiites, Christians and Muslims, but not massacres and extermination, militias, and car bombs.' " Back home, Youssef falls asleep and dreams of Maha standing in the shower, naked and holding a motionless child in her arms. The dream makes him reflect on his bond with Maha. That evening, Youssef attends the Sunday mass at the Our Lady of Deliverance Church (Sayyidat al-Najat), not far from his house, to commemorate Hinna. He has not had a chance to speak to Maha all day to resolve their disagreement, so he hopes to see her at the church.

In the fourth chapter, Maha is the narrator. Following her miscarriage, she has fallen into a deep depression. As she lies in bed, she reflects on a childhood marked by unrest, violence, and constant displacement. As a Christian in Iraq, Maha experiences daily discrimination and sees no future for herself and Luay in the country. Her miscarriage and subsequent depression have led her to turn increasingly toward her faith. She tries to find solace in the Easter hymns of the Lebanese singer Fairuz, particularly those about the grieving Virgin Mary, which she listens to for weeks on end, something Luay does not understand. In the afternoon, Maha goes to school, but she is unable to concentrate, her mind repeatedly drifting back to her argument with Youssef.

In the final chapter, the church where Youssef and Maha attend Sunday evening mass is attacked by militants from the Islamic State of Iraq. Youssef is shot and killed during the assault, while Maha and other worshippers are taken hostage and held inside the church. Several hours later, the building is stormed and liberated by government anti-terrorism forces. Maha survives the attack and, three days later, shares her account on Ishtar TV. In her testimony, she issues a plea for the acceptance of Iraq's Christian community and an end to the violence against them. Maha emphasizes that Iraqi Christians have lived in Iraq for centuries and are not foreigners.

== Background ==
=== Sinan Antoon ===
Sinan Antoon is not only a novelist, but also a poet, literary translator, and academic. He was born and raised in Baghdad, but emigrated to the United States after the Gulf War in 1991, one year after he had earned his BA in English at Baghdad University. In 2006, he completed a PhD in Arabic literature at Harvard University. Antoon has published three collections of Arabic poetry and has written five novels, four of which have been translated into English (the second one by the author himself), and Antoon is currently working on the English translation of his latest book, which will be published in 2026. According to Al-Ahram Weekly "Sinan Antoon is fast becoming not only the voice of the disaffections of modern Iraq, but also one of the most acclaimed authors of the Arab world."

In addition to writing fiction and poetry, Antoon has translated literary works by writers including Mahmoud Darwish and Saadi Youssef into English. He has also authored academic articles on Arabic poetry, as well as on the history and politics of Iraq. Currently, Antoon holds the position of Associate Professor at the Gallatin School of New York University.

=== Historical background ===
Initially, Antoon wanted to write a novel about an old, middle-class, Christian man who refuses to leave his house in Baghdad despite the devastation caused by the sectarian civil war triggered by the American invasion. However, the attack on Baghdad's Our Lady of Deliverance Church by the Islamic State of Iraq on 31 October 2010, killing 58 congregants, led Antoon to introduce another character, adding a new layer to the narrative. The author, born a Christian, is very familiar with that church and had attended it multiple times for funerals and weddings. This attack on the church was not the first one since the American invasion, but it was the most disastrous and shocking, provoking much reaction among Iraqi Christians, particularly in the diaspora.

Antoon aimed to weave his narrative into the event to accentuate the internal rifts among Iraqi Christians, revealing how differently they view their history and their minority position in Iraq. Through this novel, Antoon wanted to preserve the dying voices and memories of all the Youssefs: secular, non-sectarian Iraqis who believed in the possibility of a pluralist Iraq. Nevertheless, he also sought to acknowledge the voice of Maha and others like her who had internalized sectarian identities and could not believe in a unified, inclusive Iraq anymore. The author finishes the novel without drawing a clear conclusion, nor does he provide hope, as the story ends with Youssef's death, while Maha survives.

== Analysis ==
=== Title ===
The English title, The Baghdad Eucharist, refers to the Holy Eucharist, a part of the Mass in which the faithful commemorate the suffering and death of Jesus. Due to the ongoing violent sectarianism, culminating in the attack on the church, Christians from Baghdad suffer and die, in a way becoming partakers in the suffering of Christ. The author does not draw any further conclusions, leaving it up to the reader to decide whether the fate of Iraq's Christians serves a higher purpose. The original title of the book, Ya Maryam (Oh Mary), is the standard form of addressing Mary in Arabic, frequently used as the beginning of many prayers and hymns. After Maha loses her baby boy, she finds solace in the suffering of the Virgin Mary, who is also crying over her Son. When the church that is dedicated to Mary's deliverance is being attacked, both Maha and Youssef pray to Mary for comfort, and Youssef dies with her name on his lips.

=== Time and perspective ===
The plot unfolds almost entirely within 24 hours, with the exception of Maha's television interview, which takes place three days after the attack on the church. The author uses three narrative voices: chapters 1 and 3 are narrated by Youssef, chapter 4 is narrated by Maha, and chapters 2 and 5 are narrated by an omniscient narrator.

=== Themes ===
==== Sectarianism ====
According to the author himself, the main theme of the novel is sectarianism and the development of sectarian identities in Iraq, but also the refusal to think along sectarian lines, as depicted through Youssef.

==== Conflicting memories ====
Youssef and Maha both reflect on the history of their homeland, yet their perspectives differ completely. They recall similar events, but their interpretations and conclusions about Iraq's past, present, and future diverge. Youssef holds warm and positive memories of his youth in Iraq and believes that the rise in sectariarianism is not truly about religion, but rather a different guise for the political power struggle. He therefore sees the violent sectarianism as something that will pass. Maha, by contrast, has known nothing but war and violence and has never experienced the peaceful coexistence of different religious communities that Youssef cherishes. As a result she sees Muslim intolerance as the basis of sectarianism. Ultimately, Maha is unable to imagine a future for herself in Iraq.

==== Loss ====
The theme of loss recurs throughout the narrative. Youssef loses all his siblings, either to death or emigration, and is left behind alone. Maha loses her unborn child and her joy in life. Iraq loses its Christian population and, with it, its pluralistic character. With the passing of Youssef's generation, Iraq also loses a collective memory of the country as something other than a place torn apart by war and violence.

==== Religion, identity, and tolerance ====
The role of religion is a central theme in the novel. The story shows the suffering that results from the weaponization of religion. Youssef does not consider himself very religious, his national identity is far more important to him than his religious identity, and he does not believe in violence based solely on religion. Yet he is the one who dies as a result of religious violence, and in his final moments he turns to his faith for comfort. Maha, deeply drawn to religion by the loss of her child, makes a televised plea for religious tolerance after the attack on the church.

=== Motifs ===
==== Date palm ====
Youssef has worked his entire life for the Iraqi Date Palm Authority, and he feels a deep affection for the date palm. In the Semitic civilizations, the date palm is seen as a sacred, life-giving tree. For Youssef, the palm tree is not only the source of his livelihood, but also a source of personal fulfillment. In the novel, the date palm emerges as the national symbol of Iraq. The tree, with its large leaves and sweet dates, symbolizes the once prosperous Iraq, and Antoon shows that Iraqi Christians are just as much a part of Iraq as the date palm tree.

==== Virgin Mary ====
The Virgin Mary features prominently throughout the novel. She is the figure to whom Maha turns in her grief and with whom she identifies. The church named after Mary is the site of the attack, and both Youssef and Maha invoke her name as the assault unfolds.

== Reception ==
When the novel came out, it was widely read in the Arab world, and in 2013 the work was shortlisted for the International Prize for Arabic fiction. It took five years for the novel to be translated into English. In an interview, Sinan Antoon said about this: "Quite often, translated literature from the global south has to go through invisible checkpoints and gates before arriving in Anglophone reading spaces. It arrives bearing 'marks' and 'labels' that overdetermine the way it is read." He expresses the hope that his work is read as a novel, not as a 'document', and adds that he would not want it to fall into the hands of Islamophobes. When the author is asked in a 2015 interview with Tariq Ali why the novel has not yet been published in English, Antoon speaks about the minimal interest of American publishers in Arabic literature, and says: "When they have destroyed Iraq twice already, I naively expect them to have some interest in the culture of the places they destroyed."
