= Marilyn Booth =

British Arabist and translator

Marilyn Louise Booth
- Born: February 24, 1955 (age 71)
- Occupations: Scholar, Author, Translator
- Known for: Translation of Arabic literature
- Title: Khalid bin Abdullah Al Saud Professor for the Study of the Contemporary Arab World at the University of Oxford
- Awards: Man Booker International Prize (2019)

Academic background
- Education: D.Phil. in Arabic Literature and Middle Eastern History
- Alma mater: St Antony's College, Oxford; Harvard University

Academic work
- Discipline: Arabic Literature
- Institutions: University of Oxford, University of Edinburgh, Brown University, American University in Cairo, University of Illinois Urbana-Champaign
- Main interests: Translation, Arabic Literature, Feminist History
- Notable works: Celestial Bodies, May Her Likes Be Multiplied, Classes of Ladies of Cloistered Spaces

Marilyn Louise Booth (born 24 February 1955) is an author, scholar and translator of Arabic literature. Since 2015, she has been the Khalid bin Abdullah Al Saud Professor for the Study of the Contemporary Arab World at the University of Oxford and a Fellow of Magdalen College, Oxford.

== Biography ==
Booth graduated summa cum laude from Harvard University in 1978, and was the first female winner of the Wendell Scholarship. She obtained a D.Phil. in Arabic literature and Middle Eastern history from St Antony's College, Oxford in 1985. She received a Marshall Fellowship for her doctoral studies at Oxford. She has taught at Brown University, American University in Cairo, and University of Illinois, Urbana-Champaign. She was director of the Center for South Asian and Middle Eastern Studies at UIUC. She currently holds the Iraq Chair of Arabic and Islamic Studies at the University of Edinburgh.

Booth has written three books, including one on the Egyptian nationalist poet Bayram al-Tunisi, as well as numerous scholarly papers and book chapters. She has also translated numerous works of Arabic literature into English. Her work has appeared in Banipal and Words Without Borders. She is a past winner of the Arkansas Arabic Translation Award and runner-up for the Banipal Prize, and her translation of Celestial Bodies by Jokha al-Harthi won the 2019 Man Booker International Prize. She also served as a judge for the Banipal Prize in 2008 and 2009.

=== Girls of Riyadh dispute ===
Booth was the original translator of Rajaa Alsanea's bestseller Girls of Riyadh. However, in a letter to the Times Literary Supplement in September 2007, she asserted that the author Alsanea and the publishers Penguin had interfered with her initial translation, resulting in a final version that was "inferior and infelicitous". Booth also wrote about this incident in a scholarly article titled "Translator v. author" published in a 2008 issue of Translation Studies.

== Selected works ==
=== Author ===
- Classes of Ladies of Cloistered Spaces: Writing Feminist History through Biography in Fin-de-Siècle Egypt. Edinburgh: Edinburgh University Press, 2015.
- May Her Likes Be Multiplied: Biography and Gender Politics in Egypt. Berkeley and Los Angeles: University of California Press, 2001. Translated into Arabic as: Shahirat al-nisa’: Adab al-tarajim wa-siyasiyyat al-naw’ fi Misr. Trans. Sahar Tawfiq. Cairo: Al-Markaz al-qawmi lil-tarjama (no. 1265), 2008.
- Bayram al Tunisi’s Egypt: Social Criticism and Narrative Strategies. St. Antony's Middle East Monographs no. 22. Exeter: Ithaca Press, 1990.

=== Translator ===
- The Penguin's Song by Hassan Daoud
- As Though She Were Sleeping by Elias Khoury
- Girls of Riyadh by Rajaa Alsanea
- Thieves in Retirement by Hamdi Abu Golayyel (runner-up, Banipal Prize, 2007)
- The Loved Ones by Alia Mamdouh
- Disciples of Passion by Hoda Barakat
- The Tiller of Waters by Hoda Barakat
- Voices of the Lost by Hoda Barakat (shortlisted, Banipal Prize, 2021)
- Children of the Waters by Ibtihal Salem
- Leaves of Narcissus by Somaya Ramadan
- The Open Door by Latifa al-Zayyat
- Points of the Compass by Sahar Tawfiq (winner, Arkansas Arabic Translation Award, 1994/5)
- My Grandmother’s Cactus: Stories by Egyptian Women
- Memoirs from the Women's Prison by Nawal El Saadawi
- The Circling Song by Nawal El Saadawi
- Celestial Bodies by Jokha al-Harthi

== See also ==
- List of Arabic-English translators
