= Nael Eltoukhy =

Egyptian writer

Nael Eltoukhy (born 1978) is an Egyptian author, columnist and translator. Eltoukhy has published two novellas and three novels in Arabic, including Al Alfen wa seta (Two Thousand and Six, 2009) and Nisaa Al Karantina (Women of Karantina, 2013,) which Mahmoud El-Wardani called "a new twist in the evolution of the form of the Egyptian novel itself." The latter has been translated into English by Robin Moger, who also translated an extract of Eltoukhy's third novel, Out of the Gutter (2018). Eltoukhy has also translated two books from Hebrew to Arabic, while his columns and short stories have appeared in the New York Times, Mada Masr, Al-Safir, among others.

== Early life and education ==
Eltoukhy was born in Kuwait, and studied Hebrew at Ain Shams University.

== Translations of Hebrew ==
Eltoukhy's passion for Hebrew is “rare” by his own admission, among students of the language in Arab universities. He was curious about Hebrew because he felt Arabs didn't know anything about Israel from the inside. However, earlier on Eltoukhy had wanted to study English, but his grades were not high enough, so he chose to study Hebrew instead.

Eltoukhy went on to translate provocative Israeli authors, such as late playwright Hanoch Levin, who Eltoukhy mentions as his dream, as well as Idith Zertal’s Israel’s Holocaust and the Politics of Nationhood, and Almog Behar's Chahla ve-Hezkel (Rachel and Ezekiel).

According to Eltoukhy, it is easy to publish Hebrew to Arabic translations in Egypt, however the problem lies with publishers not wanting to pay royalties to an Israeli publisher as it would be seen as a form of normalization. Therefore, he has worked with younger authors that are willing to give up their royalties to circumvent the politics.
