= Mahmoud Al-Wardani =

Egyptian writer, novelist, storyteller and journalist (born 1950)

- Born: January 1, 1950 (age 76); Cairo, Egypt
- Occupations: writer, narrator, storyteller and journalist

Mahmoud Al-Wardani (Arabic: محمود الورداني; born January 1, 1950) is an Egyptian writer, novelist, storyteller and journalist. He participated in the October War in 1973, co-founded the newspaper Akhbar Al-Adab. Some of his short stories where translated to French and English.

== Early life ==
He was born on January 1, 1950, in the Shubra neighborhood of Cairo. He was orphaned at a young age and forced to work. He sold ice, worked in a laundry, a cane juice shop, a café, then a studio.

He then started writing. He published his first novel work in the 1980s. He joined the student council and participated in a political debate.

He graduated from the Institute of Social Work in 1972. He was arrested that after a student protest. He remained affiliated with the Egyptian left and aligned with his class, which he remained defending and speaking in his novels and anecdotal works. He claimed to see no conflict between the ideology of the writer and his political and intellectual views. He claimed that the saying "ideology in literature is like impurities in gold" was false. He joined many secret organizations such as Hadto Organization which he wrote about in Hadto: A Biography of a Communist Organization (Original title: Hdtw: Syrt Ddhatyt Lmnzmt Shywey). He joined the "Kefaya" movement against corruption and participated in the era of late President Mohamed Hosni Mubarak, and in demonstrations against corruption and the Presidential succession. In the 25 January 2011 revolution, since its early days, which ended with Mubarak's resignation.

== Works and publications ==
Mahmoud Al-Wardani wrote many books varying from long novels to short story collections, including:

- Walking in the Garden at Night (Original title: alsayr fi alhadiqat lylan) (a collection of short stories): (1984) Cairo.
- Nuba Return (Original title: nubat rujue) (novel): It was (1990) Egyptian General Book Organization in Cairo.
- The Smell of Oranges (Original title: rayihat alburtuqal )(a novel): (1992) Sharqiyat Publishing House in Cairo, (2007) reprinted Egyptian General Book Organization in Cairo.
- Al-Rawd Al-Atir (novel): (1993) Dar Al-Hilal for printing and publishing, Cairo.
- The High Stars (Original title: alnujum alealia) (a collection of short stories): (1985).
- In the Shadow and the Sun (Original title: fi alzili walshams) (a short story collection): (1995).
- Taste of the Fire (Original title: taem alhariq) (novel): (1995), and in 2020, a television series based on the novel was released entitled “The Moon is the End of the World” (Original title: ), starring Bushra, and directed) Tamer Hamza.
- Awan Al-Qitaf (novel): It was (2002) Dar Al-Hilal for printing, publishing and distribution in Cairo.
- Hadto: A Biography of a Communist Organization (2007) Dar Al-Hilal for Printing and Publishing in Cairo.
- Music of the Mall (Original title: musiqaa almul) (novel): (2007) Da Merit Publishing, Cairo.
- The Morning Party (Original title: alhafl alsabahiu) (a collection of short stories): (2008) Dar Al Mahrousa for Publishing, Cairo.
- Some of what can be said – papers that are not personal (Original title: baed mayumkin qawluh – 'awraq laysat shakhsiatan): (2009) the Egyptian General Authority for Cultural Palaces in Cairo.
- Freedom Tales (Original title: hikayat alhuriyati): (2011) the Egyptian General Authority for Cultural Palaces in Cairo.
- The House of Fire (Original title: bayt alnaar)(novel): (2012) Merit Publishing House, Cairo.
- Searching for Dina (Original title: albahth ean dina)(a novel): (2016) Dar Al-Kutub Khan Publishing House, Cairo.
- Bab Al-Khaimah (Original title: bab alkhayma)(novel): (2018) Al-Ain Publishing House.
- The Silence of the Sands (Original title: samt alrimal) (collection of short stories): (2018) the Egyptian General Authority for Cultural Palaces in Cairo

== Awards ==
Mahmoud Al-Wardani was honored by many parties in the Arab world, including many literary awards, the most important of which is first prize in the novel branch for senior writers, and in the 2013 Sawiris Cultural Competition for his novel House of Fire.
