= Humphrey T. Davies =

British translator of Arabic fiction (1947–2021)

- Born: 6 April 1947; London, England
- Died: 12 November 2021 (aged 74); London, England
- Occupation: translator
- Notable work: The Yacoubian Building, from Alaa Al Aswany's ʿImārat Yaʿqūbīān

Humphrey T. Davies (6 April 1947 – 12 November 2021) was a British translator of Arabic fiction, historical and classical texts. Born in Great Britain, he studied Arabic in college and graduate school. He worked for decades in the Arab world and was based in Cairo from the late 20th century to 2021. He translated at least 18 Arabic works into English, including contemporary literature. He is a two-time winner of the Banipal Prize.

== Life and career ==
Born in London on 6 April 1947, Davies studied Arabic at Cambridge University and the American University in Cairo's Centre for Arabic Studies Abroad (CASA) in the 1960s. After working in the Arabic world and as a translator for years, he completed a PhD in Arabic in 1981 at the University of California, Berkeley.

Davies worked for NGOs and funding institutions in a number of countries in the Arab world, including Save the Children in Palestine and the Ford Foundation in Sudan. He began translating in 1997. From the early 21st century, he focused solely on literary translation.

He died from pancreatic cancer in London on 12 November 2021, at the age of 74.

== Translations ==
Davies translated both classical and colloquial Arabic texts and noted in particular his "respect for colloquial Arabic." He worked in collaboration on the El-Said Badawi Dictionary of Egyptian Arabic. Davies began translating while working on a critical edition and lexicon of Yusuf al-Shirbini's Hazz al-Quhuf bi-Sharh Qasid Abi Shaduf (Brains Confounded by the Ode of Abu Shaduf Expounded), a 17th-century Egyptian text on Ottoman rural culture. This is considered a valuable source for the period's colloquial Egyptian Arabic.

Davies' first published translation was a short story by Sayed Ragab, which appeared in Banipal magazine in 2000. Subsequent translations included several well-known works of Arabic literature, including Alaa Al-Aswany's The Yacoubian Building (Arabic: عمارة يعقوبيان, ʿImārat Yaʿqūbīān, 2002). His 2004 translation was voted one of 50 outstanding translations in the last 50 years by the British Society of Authors. His translation of Lebanese writer Elias Khoury's novel Gate of the Sun (Arabic: باب الشمس, Bab al-shams), won the English PEN "Writers in Translation" award and the Banipal Prize for Arabic Literary Translation.

Davies said that when he translated the work of a living author, he made it his practice to call upon the author for advice. His work has been published by AUC Press, Words Without Borders, and Banipal.

Other translations include:

- Thebes at War, a novel by Naguib Mahfouz
- Friendly Fire, a collection of short stories by Alaa Al-Aswany
- Being Abbas el Abd by Ahmed Alaidy
- Pyramid Texts by Gamal al-Ghitani
- The Mahfouz Dialogues by Gamal al-Ghitani
- Black Magic by Hamdy el-Gazzar
- Tales of Dayrut by Mohamed Mustagab
- Life Is More Beautiful Than Paradise by Khaled al-Berry
- Yalo, a novel by Elias Khoury (British edition, winner of the Banipal Prize)
- Sunset Oasis, a novel by Bahaa Taher (joint runner-up for the Banipal Prize)
- As Though She Were Sleeping by Elias Khoury
- Children of the Ghetto (both volumes) by Elias Khoury
- Midaqq Alley, a novel by Naguib Mahfouz
- Leg Over Leg (Al-Saq ‘ala al-Saq) by Ahmad Faris Shidyaq
- In Darfur: An Account of the Sultanate and Its People by Muḥammad al-Tūnisī

== Books ==
- A Field Guide to the Street Names of Central Cairo by Humphrey T. Davies and Lesley Lababidi

== Awards and honours ==
- 2006 Banipal Prize for Arabic Literary Translation, winner for Gate of the Sun by Elias Khoury
- 2006 English PEN "Writers in Translation" award, winner for Gate of the Sun by Elias Khoury
- 2010 Banipal Prize for Arabic Literary Translation, winner for Yalo by Elias Khoury
- 2010 Banipal Prize for Arabic Literary Translation, runner-up for Sunset Oasis by Bahaa Taher
- 2010 Independent Foreign Fiction Prize, longlisted for Yalo by Elias Khoury
- 2012 Banipal Prize for Arabic Literary Translation, runner-up for I Was Born There, I Was Born Here by Mourid Barghouti
- 2014 Best Translated Book Award, shortlist for Leg Over Leg Vol. 1 by Ahmad Faris al-Shidyaq
