= Fadia Faqir =

Fadia Faqir (Arabic: فادية الفقير) is a Jordanian British author and academician, involved in human rights issues. She was born in Amman, Jordan, and her father is from Jordan, of the tribe Al-Ajarmah. But her mother is Circassian.

== Biography ==
Faqir was born in Amman in 1956 and educated in Jordan and England. She gained her BA in English Literature from the University of Jordan, Amman, before going in 1984 to Britain where she completed an MA in creative writing at Lancaster University. The University of East Anglia awarded her the first PhD in Creative and Critical Writing in 1990. Her first novel, Nisanit, published by Penguin in 1988, is set in two undisclosed Middle East countries, and recounts the story of a young girl whose father is arrested because of his political activities, and a Palestinian guerrilla fighter captured by the Israeli forces. Pillars of Salt, her second novel, was published by Quartet Books in 1996, and has been translated into German, Danish, Dutch, Romanian and Bulgarian. Set in colonial and postcolonial Jordan, according to one critic, the novel 'stands between East and West, and combines Arabic traditional storytelling with postmodern narrative tricks'. There is a strong feminist message concerning two Arab women, one a Bedouin, the other from the town, incarcerated in an asylum through the actions of their brother and husband respectively. The author blames both the patriarchy of her native land and the meddling of the British colonizer for the fates of both women.

In 2007, Faqir's novel My Name is Salma (USA, The Cry of the Dove) was published by Doubleday. The story follows the life of the eponymous Arab woman starting from her early Bedouin life until, having given birth to an illegitimate daughter and fearful of becoming victim to an ‘honour killing’ at the hands of her brother, she is forced to flee as a refugee to Britain. As a migrant she suffers indifference and racial abuse, and longs to return home to find her daughter. But "for Salma, religion and homeland are both intertwined, both judgmental and cruel, simultaneously the sites of public shame and individual guilt" My Name is Salma was translated into 13 languages and published in 16 countries.

The prologue of Faqir’s fourth novel, At the Midnight Kitchen, was published in Weber Studies and won their fiction award for 2009.

Faqir has also published play scripts and short stories including "The Separation Wall", first published in Magnetic North by New Writing North in 2005. She introduced and edited In the House of Silence: Autobiographical Essays by Arab Women Writers, published in 1998. This formed part of the award-winning series, Arab Women Writers (translated from Arabic), published by Garnet, for which Faqir was general editor. Until 2005, Faqir was Lecturer and coordinator for the Project of Middle Eastern Women's Studies at the Centre for Middle Eastern and Islamic Studies at the University of Durham. Since then she has mainly concentrated on writing fiction, as well as teaching creative writing, and is currently Writing Fellow at St Aidan's College, University of Durham. She is the initiator and co-founder of the Banipal Visiting Writer Fellowship.

Faqir's work is written entirely in English and is the subject of much ongoing academic research and discussion, particularly for its 'translation' of aspects of Arab culture. It is recognised for its stylistic invention and its incorporation of issues to do with Third World women's lives, migration, and cultural in-betweeness.

== Bibliography ==
Novels

- Willow Trees Don't Weep, Heron Books, 2014, ISBN 978-1782069508
- My Name is Salma (USA title The Cry of the Dove), Transworld, 2007, ISBN 978-0385610988
- Pillars of Salt, Quartet Books, 1996, ISBN 978-1566562539
- Nisanit, Penguin, 1988, ISBN 978-0140133332
- At home of the silent, biography articles for the Arab women writers, edited and translated by Shirly Ebber.
- Reading: Garnet for public limited publishing in 1998.

Edited volume

- In the House of Silence: autobiographical essays by Arab women writers, edited and co-translated with Shirly Ebber, Reading: Garnet Publishing Ltd, 1998, ISBN 978-1859640234

Short fiction

- "Mr. Sufian Didan: Il-Doctoor Meets Monique", Moving Worlds: A Journal of Transcultural Writing, 2009
- "Al-Qaeda’s Kitchen", Weber Studies, 2009
- "My Name is Salma", Lisan, No. 5, 2008, pp. 96–103 (German)
- "The Separation Wall", Bound, New Writing North, 2004, and in Magnetic North, 2005
- "Purple Heart", Home, ISIS Arts and Northern Print Studio, 2004

Poetic prose

- "Regarding War: Image/Text" (with photographer Richard Hanson), Centre for Transcultural Writing and Research, University of Lancaster, 2008
- "Sofia Blues", Magnetic North, New Writing North, 2005

Chapters in books

- "Tales of War: Arab Women in the Eye of the Storm", in Victoria Brittain (ed.), The Gulf Between US, Virago Press, London, 1991, pp. 61–77
- "Western Celebration and Arab Outrage", in John Gittings (ed.), Beyond the Gulf War, The Catholic Institute for International Relations, London, 1991
- "In Search of Andalusia: Arabic Literature Today", in Malcolm Bradbury (ed.), The Atlas of Literature, De Agostini Editions, London, 1996, pp. 291–294
- "Is Pillars of Salt a Muslim Tale?", in Jalal Uddin Khan and Adrian Hare (eds), English and Islam: Creative Encounters 96, International Islamic University of Malaysia, 1998, pp. 123–137
- "ديمقراطيات بلا ديمقراطية المرأة العربية و المواطنة" (Women Democrats without Democracy? Arab women and Citizenship), Al-Muwatana wa al-Dimuqratiyya fi al-Buldan al-'Arabiyya (Democracy and Citizenship in Arab Countries), Markaz Darasat al-Wihdah al-'Arabiyya, Beirut, 2001, pp. 181–217 (Discussed by Abdul Hamid Isma’il al-Ansari)

Articles

- "Occupied Palestine: the writer as Eyewitness" (review article), Third World Quarterly, Vol. 9, No. 4, October 1987, pp. 1495–1409
- "Beyond the Desert Storm: Western Attitudes to the Arab World", Planet journal, No. 85, February/March 1990, pp. 3–8
- "L'Islam e le sue guerriere" (The Unknown War of Arab Women), MondoOperaio, No. 1, January 1992, pp. 36–38
- "Engendering Democracy and Islam", Third World Quarterly, Vol. 18, No. 1, 1997, pp. 165–174
- "Arab Democracy Minus Women: Gender, Democracy and Citizenship in Jordan", Asian Women, Vol. 11, 2000, pp. 61–89
- "Intrafamily femicide in defence of honour: the case of Jordan", Third World Quarterly, Vol. 22, No. 1, 2001, pp. 65–82
- "Dimuqratiyyat bidun Dimuqratiyya? al-Mar’a al-Arabiyya wa al-Muwatana" (Women Democrats Without Democracy: Arab women and citizenship), Al-Mustaqbal journal, Vol. 24, No. 271, July–September 2001, pp. 28–55
- "Where is the 'W' factor? Women and the war on Afghanistan", OpenDemocracy, 27 February 2002
- "Lost in Translation: The Arab book in the language of the 'other'", Index on Censorship, Volume 33, issue 211, April 2004
- "Female and Fighting", Critical Muslim, issue 1, January–March 2012

Edited series

- Arab Women Writers Series, Garnet Publishing, April 1995-April 1996, Barakat, Hoda, The Stone of Laughter; Naana, Hamida, The Homeland; Bakr, Salwa, The Golden Chariot; Badr, Liana, The Eye of the Mirror; Mamdouh, Alia, Mothballs.

Plays

- Turn Your Head Not (Danish title "ALTID FREMMED HVOR DU GÅR"), devised and directed by Malene Frome, Café Theatret, Copenhagen, 2006
- "Salma, Ya Salma!", a monologue, part of 1001 Nights Now, Directed by Alan Lyddiard, The Betty Nansen Theatre, Copenhagen, 2002
- "The Paper Factory" and "E-mails to Shahrazad", short plays part of 1001 Nights Now, devised and directed by Alan Lyddiard, 2005

== Prizes ==
- The Danish translation of My Name is Salma was a runner-up for the ALOA Literary Prize, given annually by the Centre for Literature from Africa, Asia, Latin America, and Oceania in Denmark, 2010
- "Al-Qaeda’s Kitchen", published in Weber Studies Journal won the Dr. Neila C. Seshachari Fiction Award 2009
- The Danish translation of Pillars of Salt was the runner-up for ALOA Literary Prize, given annually by the Centre for Literature from Africa, Asia, Latin America, and Oceania in Denmark, 2001
- The Arab Women Writers Series (senior editor Fadia Faqir) was awarded Women in Publishing New Venture Award 1995
