= Ahmed Mejjati =

Moroccan poet

Ahmed Mejjati (born in Casablanca in 1936 – October 1995) was an influential Moroccan avant-garde poet.

== Biography ==
Mejjati studied in Damascus and completed his PhD in Arabic literature at the Mohammed V University in Rabat, where he also worked as a professor of Arabic literature.

He won the Ibn Zaydoun Award for poetry in Madrid in 1985, and the Prix du Maroc du livre in 1987.

== Work ==
Mejjati's poetry uses pure Arabic diction and original syntactic formation. He published poems in magazines, but only one book of poetry: Al Fouroussiya (Chivalry).

The Syrian critic Mohammed Mohi Eddine called Mejjati's poem Assouqout one of the most beautiful poems in the Arabic language.

== Bibliography ==
- Al Fouroussiya (Chivalry), ed. Publications of the national council for Arab culture, Rabat, 1987
- Ahmad Al Maggati Poète d'avant-garde marocain, thèse de doctorat d'Etat soutenue à Aix-Marseille, 1988
