= Hilal Chouman =

Lebanese novelist and writer

Hilal Chouman (Arabic: هلال شومان; born 1982) is a Lebanese novelist and writer. He was born in Beirut and studied communications and electronics engineering at Jâmi'at Bâyrut Al-Arabiya. He then obtained an MSc in aerospace communication systems and satellite communications. He now lives and works in Toronto.

== Writing ==
Literary scholars have described Chouman's writing as Post–Cold War era or post-Lebanese Civil War, with emphasis on the ordinary or mundane. Chouman himself disagrees with the designations of war or post-war based on time of publication. His writing also features more contemporary life in Beirut.

=== Novels ===
- Stories of Sleep (2008)
- Napolitana (2010)
- Limbo Beirut (2012) - translated by Anna Ziajka Stanton and nominated for the PEN Translation Prize (2017) and the Saif Ghobash Banipal Prize (2017)
- Once Upon a Time, Tomorrow (2016)
- Sorrow in My Heart (2022)
