= Hamdy el-Gazzar =

Egyptian writer (born 1970)

Hamdy el-Gazzar (Arabic: حمدي الجزار; born 1 October 1970) is an Egyptian writer. He was born in Giza and studied philosophy at Cairo University. He has been publishing since the 1990s; his literary output includes novels, short stories, stage plays and screenplays.

His first novel (Sehr Aswad) Black Magic won the Sawiris Prize and has been translated into English by Humphrey Davies. His second novel Ladhdhat Sirriyya (Secret Pleasures) was published in 2008.

Hamdy el-Gazzar was one of the 39 young Arab authors chosen by the Beirut39 project.

== See also ==
- Mohamed Salah El Azab
