= Bahaa Abdelmegid =

Egyptian writer

Bahaa Abdelmegid (died 13 December 2020) was an Egyptian writer. He obtained a PhD from Ain Shams University, where he taught in the English department. He wrote several novels and short stories. Two of these have been translated into English: Temple Bar, translated by Jonathan Wright, and Saint Theresa, and Sleeping with Strangers, translated by Chip Rossetti.

Abdelmegid died from complications related to Covid-19 on 13 December 2020.
