= Maia Tabet =

Arabic-English literary translator

- Born: 1956 (age 69–70); Beirut, Lebanon
- Education: American University of Beirut
- Occupation: literary translator

Maia Tabet is an Arabic-English literary translator with a background in editing and journalism. Born in Beirut, Lebanon, in 1956, she was raised in Lebanon, India, and England. She studied philosophy and political science at the American University of Beirut and lives between the United States and Cyprus.

== Career ==
Tabet is noted for her translation of two novels by the late Lebanese author Elias Khoury: Little Mountain and White Masks. The former was the first Khoury novel to appear in English translation (in 1989) while the second was nominated for the 2011 Saif Ghobash–Banipal Prize for Arabic Literary Translation and won the judges' commendation. She has co-translated, with Michael K. Scott, the controversial Throwing Sparks (Tarmee bi-Sharar) by Saudi writer Abdo Khal, a novel that garnered the 2010 International Prize for Arabic Fiction (IPAF), aka the Arabic Booker Prize. In 2017, her translation of Sinan Antoon's Ya Mariam was published as The Baghadad Eucharist (AUC Press/Hoopoe), and The Monotonous Chaos of Existence (Mason Jar Press), a collection of short stories by Jordanian author, poet, and activist Hisham Bustani, came out in early 2022. Her translation of Rula al-Jurdi's first novel, titled Camera Obscura is in production with Syracuse University Press. Her seventh book-length work, provisionally titled Children of the Dew, by the late Palestinian author, poet, and journalist Mohammad al-As'ad, is forthcoming from Tilted Axis Press in a co-translation with Anaheed al-Hardan.

Tabet has also translated short stories, novel excerpts, and lyrical essays by Iman Humaydan, Najwa Barakat, Alawiya Subh, Hala Kawtharani, Abbas Beydoun, and Elias Khoury (Lebanon); Khaled Khalifa and Zakaria Tamer (Syria); Elias Farkouh and Hisham Bustani (Jordan); Ahmed Fagih (Libya); Habib Selmi (Tunisia); Luay Hamza Abbas (Iraq); Ali Muqri (Yemen); Amir Tag Elsir (Sudan); Bassam Almusallam, Jassim Al-Shammarie, and Estabraq Ahmad (Kuwait); and Ziad Abdallah (UAE). Her work has appeared in The Common, Banipal: Magazine of Modern Arab Literature, Fikrun wa Fann (a publication of the Goethe Institut), Portal 9, Rusted Radishes, Words without Borders, The Punch Magazine, Barricade, and the Journal of Palestine Studies, among others.

== Personal life ==
In addition to her commitment to social justice issues and the environment, Maia Tabet has an interest in the history of food and the art of cooking. She is the mother of two adult daughters, and has a granddaughter named Layla.

== See also ==
- List of Arabic-English translators
- Contemporary Arabic literature by women writers
