= Youssef Rakha =

Egyptian writer

- يوسف رخا
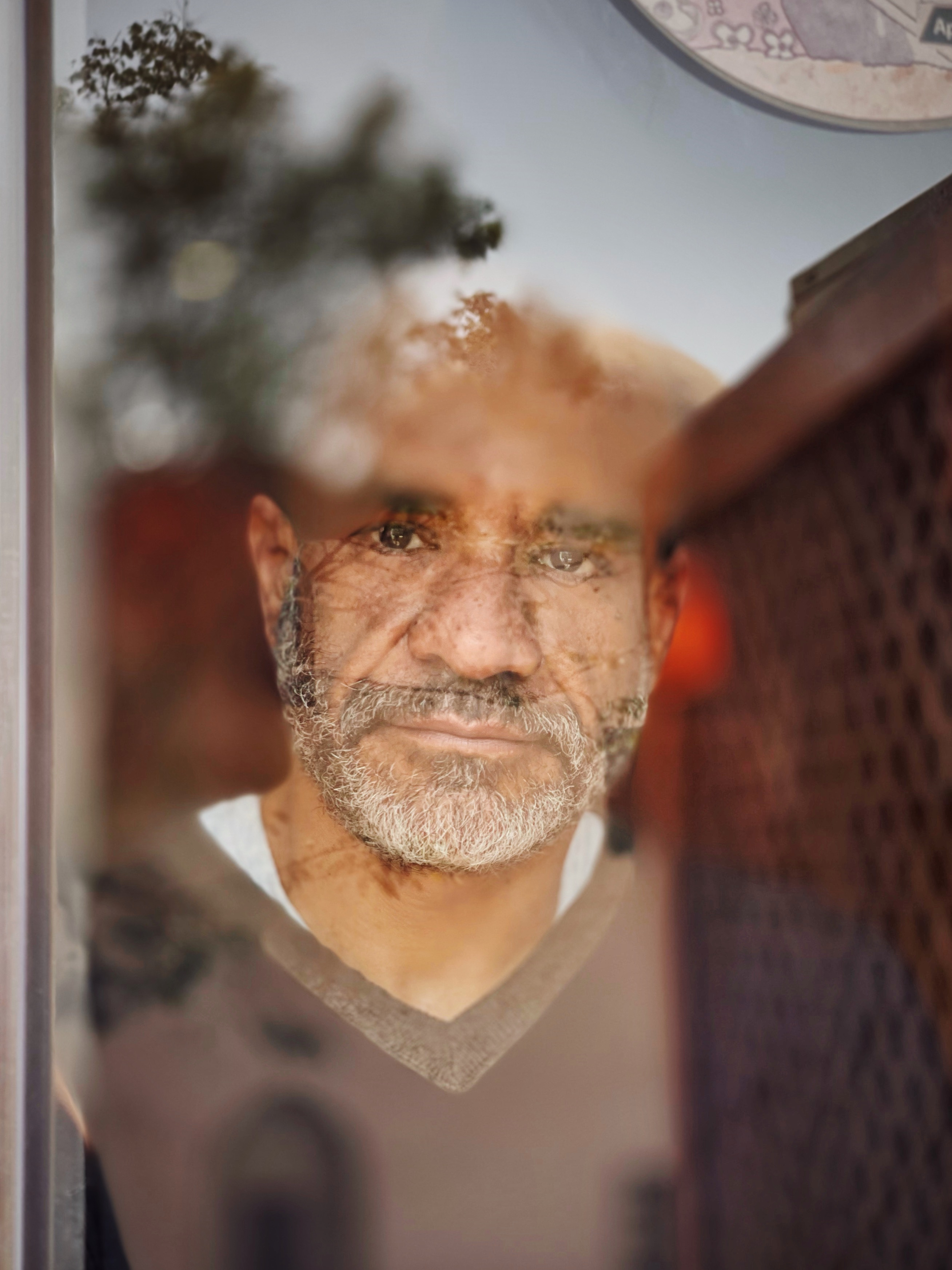
- Born: June 12, 1976 (age 50); Cairo, Egypt
- Education: University of Hull (BA)
- Spouse: Heba El Nahhas (m. 2011)
- Writing career
- Language: English, Arabic
- Years active: 1999–present
- Subjects: Cairo; Islam; the Arab Spring
- Notable work: The Book of the Sultan's Seal
- Website: therakha.org

Youssef Rakha (Arabic: يوسف رخا; born on 12 June 1976 in Cairo, Egypt) is an Egyptian writer. His work explores language and identity in the context of Cairo, and reflects connections with the Arab-Islamic canon and world literature. He has worked in many genres in both Arabic and English, and is known for his essays and poems as well as his novels.

== Early life ==
The only child of a formerly Marxist lawyer, Elsaid Rakha, and an English-to-Arabic translator, Labiba Saad, Rakha was born and grew up in Dokki, on the western bank of the Nile, where he lives with his family today. At the age of 19 he left Egypt for the UK, where he obtained a first class honours BA in English and Philosophy from Hull University in 1998.

== Writing ==
In February 2025 Graywolf Press published Rakha's first novel to be written in English, The Dissenters, followed by Peninsula Press in the UK. Postmuslim: A Testimony, Rakha's debut collection of essays, was published by Graywolf Press in September, 2026.

Rakha's first novel is The Book of the Sultan's Seal: Strange Incidents from History in the City of Mars. First published in 2011 as Kitab at-Tugra: Gharaib at-Tarikh fi Madinat al-Marrikh (Arabic: كتاب الطغرى: غرائب التاريخ في مدينة المريخ), the book is studied for its innovative use of Arabic, its postmodern take on the theme of the caliphate, its reimagining of the city of Cairo and its possible significance in the history of Arabic literature. It won the Banipal Seif Ghobash Prize for Paul Starkey’s English translation in 2015, and was published in French in 2016.

Rakha's Arabic novels also include the Crocodiles Trilogy: The Crocodiles (2013), Paulo (2016), which was nominated for the International Prize for Arabic Fiction and won the Sawiris Award, and Innaka dhahib ila al bar (2024).

Prior to writing The Book of the Sultan's Seal, Rakha contributed to the coverage of Arab culture in English for many years as a reporter, literary critic and cultural editor. He also wrote literary non-fiction and poetry in Arabic, for which he was chosen to participate in the Hay Festival Beirut39 event as one of the 39 best Arab writers under 40. His 2006 photo travelogue Beirut Shi Mahal (Arabic: بيروت شي محل), later translated into Polish, was nominated for the Lettre Ulysses Award for the Art of Reportage.

== Other work ==
Rakha is also known as a photographer, a journalist, a creative writing coach, and the editor of a bilingual literature and photography site named after his first novel, The Sultan's Seal: Cairo's Coolest Cosmopolitan Hotel, which became an archive in 2023. His photography is featured on Mada Masr Berfrois, P1xels and Bidoun. His site has helped to introduce significant young writers in Arabic like the Libyan Ali Latife, the Algerian Salah Badis, the Palestinian Carol Sansour and the Egyptian Amgad Al Sabban; it has featured literary and photographic figures including Bezav Mahmod, Hilary Plum, Niall Griffiths and Pauls Toutonghi. The site was discontinued in January 2023, but is archived at sultansseal.wordpress.com.

== Books published ==
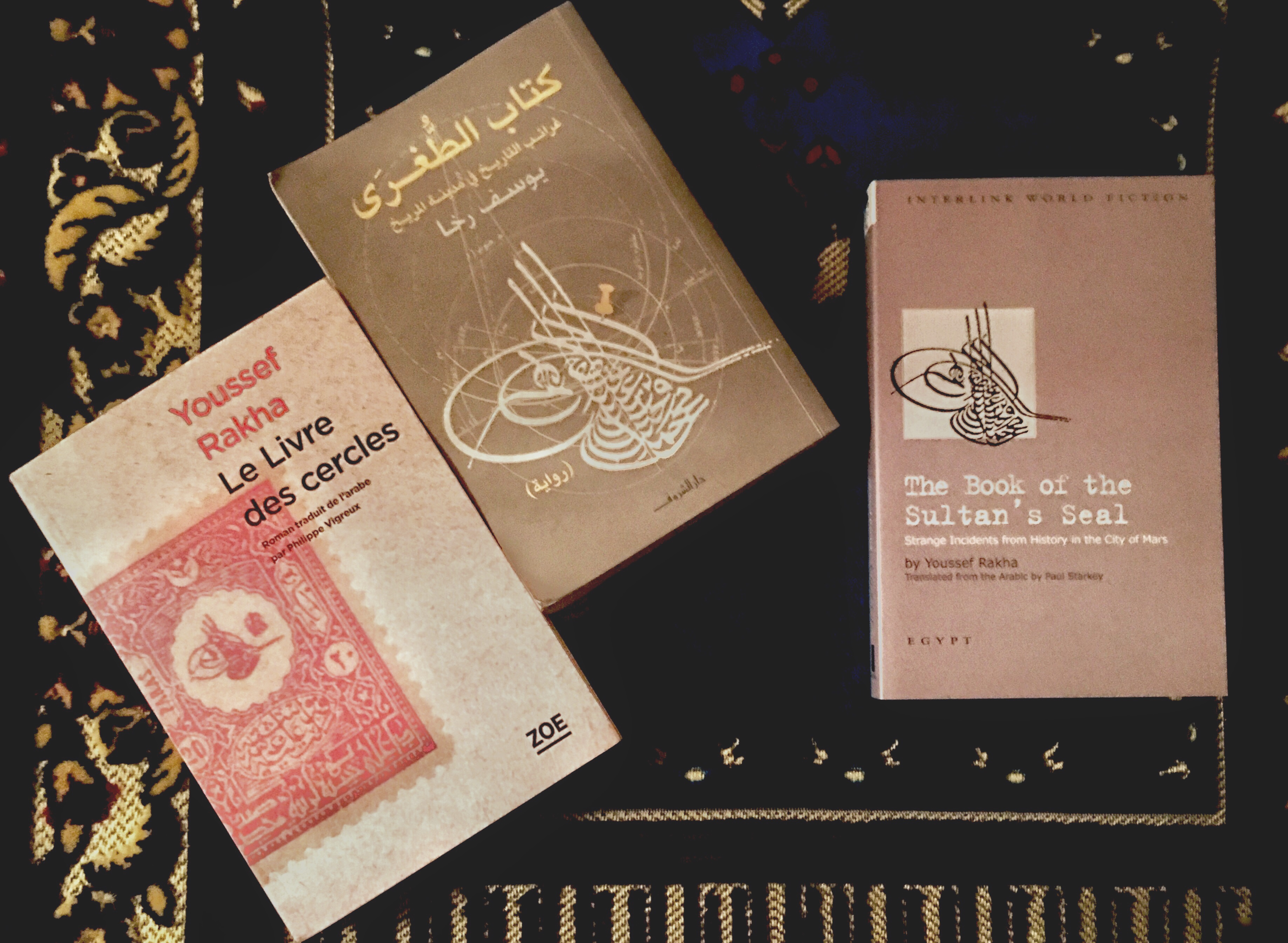
The Book of the Sultan's Seal in three languages

- Azhar ash-shams (Arabic: أزهار الشمس; Flowers of the Sun), short stories, Cairo: Dar Sharqiyat, 1999.
- Beirut shi mahal (Arabic: بيروت شي محل; Beirut Some Place), photo travelogue, Alexandria: Amkenah Books, 2006. Reviews of Beirut shi mahal appeared in, among other Arabic newspapers, Al-Ahram Al-Ittihad and Asharq Al-Awsat. The text was extracted in German translation in Lettre International 74.
- Bourguiba ala madad (Arabic: بورقيبة على مضض; Bourguiba Reluctantly), part two of Beirut shi mahal (without photos), Beirut: Riyad El-Rayyes, 2008. ISBN 9953213348
- Shamal al qahira gharb al filibbin (Arabic: شمال القاهرة غرب الفلبين; North of Cairo, West of the Philippines), travel essays, Beirut: Riyad El-Rayyes, 2009. ISBN 978-9-95321-422-1
- Kull amakinina (Arabic: كل أماكننا; All Our Places), poems and essays, Cairo: Dar Al-Ain, 2010. ISBN 978-9-77490-022-8
- The Book of the Sultan's Seal: Strange Incidents from History in the City of Mars (Arabic: كتاب الطغرى: غرائب التاريخ في مدينة المريخ), novel, Cairo: Dar Al-Shorouk, 2011. ISBN 978-9-77092-988-9. Beirut: Arab Institute for Research and Publishing, 2018. ISBN 978-6-14419-868-1. USA: Interlink, 2015. ISBN 978-1-56656-916-3. Geneva: Éditions Zoé, 2016. ISBN 978-2-88927-378-2
- The Crocodiles (Arabic: التماسيح), novel, Beirut: Dar Al-Saqi, 2012. ISBN 978-1-85516-878-7. New York: Seven Stories Press, 2015. ISBN 978-160980-571-5
- Paolo (Arabic: باولو), novel, Cairo-Beirut-Tunis: Dar Al-Tanwir, 2016. ISBN 978-977648-358-3
- Arab Porn, essay (ebook only), 60Pages (long-form collective), 2016. ASIN B01J4YMPZK. Berlin: Matthes & Seitz, 2017. ISBN 978-3-95757-382-7
- Barra and Zaman: Reading Egyptian Modernity in Shadi Abdel Salam’s The Mummy, essay, London: Palgrave Pivot (Studies in Arab Cinema), 2020. ISBN 978-303061-353-2
- Walakinna Qalbi: Mutanabbi al Alfiya al Thalitha (Arabic: ولكن قلبي: متنبي الألفية الثالثة; And Yet My Heart: Third Millennium Mutanabbi), 20 poems and a personal essay, with illustrations by Walid Taher (on a grant from the Arab Fund for Arts and Culture), Cairo-Beirut-Tunis: Dar Al-Tanwir, 2021. ISBN 978-977-828-060-9
- Walakinna Qalbi: Ma ba'd al Mutanabbi (Arabic: ولكن قلبي: ما بعد المتنبي; And Yet My Heart: Post Mutanabbi), essays and poems, with illustrations by Walid Taher, Dammam: Dar Athar, 2022. ISBN 978-603-91904-5-5
- Emissaries and Other Short Stories, London: Barakunan, 2023. ISBN 978-1-3999-3363-6
- Innaka dhahib ila al bar (Arabic: إنك ذاهب إلى البار; You Are Going to the Bar), novella, Milano: Almutawassit, 2024. ISBN 979-1-25591-029-9
- The Dissenters, novel, Minneapolis: Graywolf Press, 2025. ISBN 978-1-64445-319-3; London: Peninsula Press, 2025. ISBN 978-1-91351-267-5
- Postmuslim: A Testimony, Minneapolis: Graywolf Press, 2026. ISBN 978-1-64445-415-2; London: Peninsula Press, 2026. ISBN 978-1-91351-289-7
