= Elias Khoury =

Lebanese intellectual, playwright and novelist (1948–2024)

- إلياس خوري
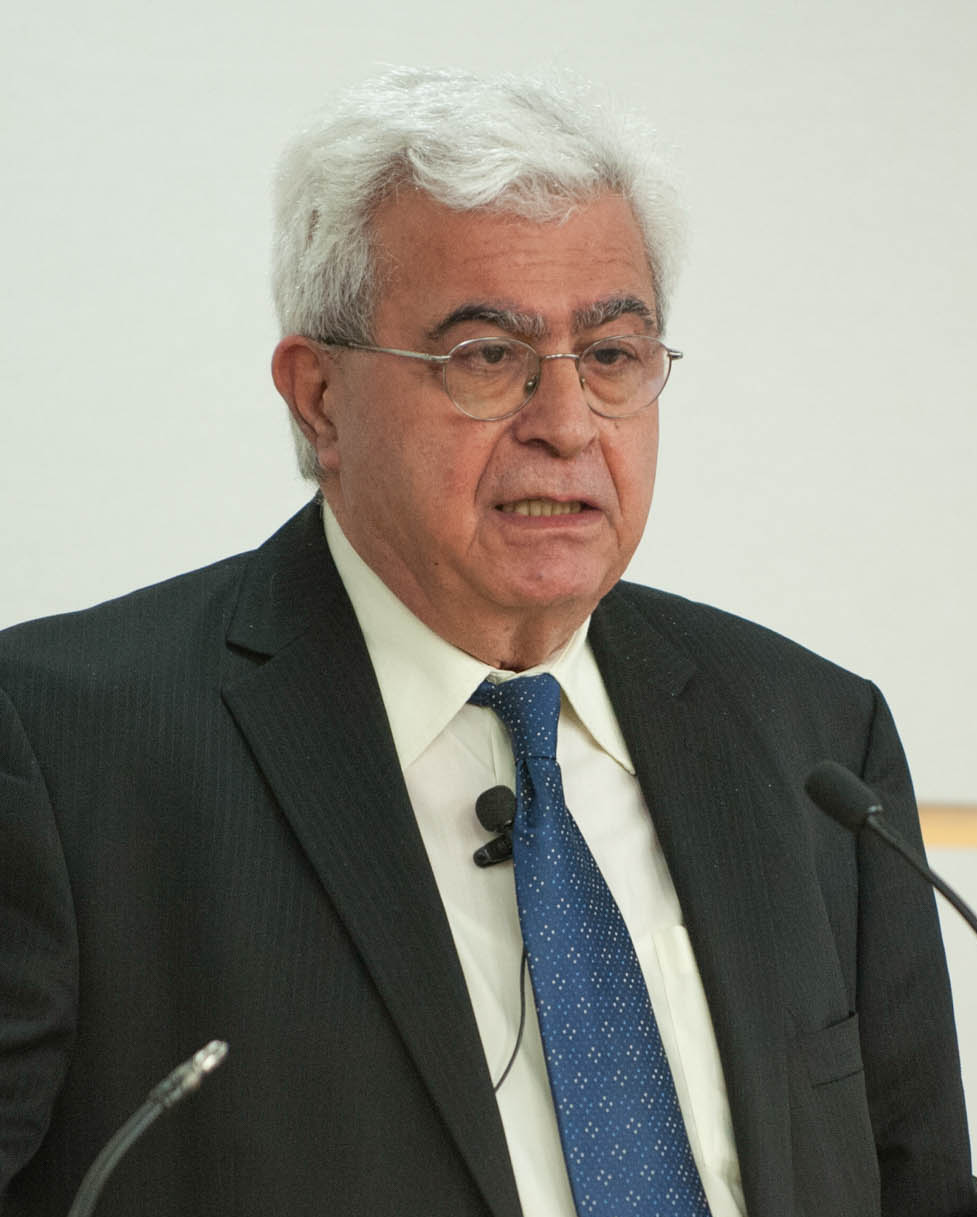
- Khoury in 2016
- Born: 12 July 1948; Beirut, Lebanon
- Died: 15 September 2024 (aged 76); Beirut, Lebanon
- Education: Lebanese University; University of Paris (PhD)
- Occupations: Novelist and public intellectual
- Notable work: Gate of The Sun

Elias Khoury (Arabic: إلياس خوري; 12 July 1948 – 15 September 2024) was a Lebanese novelist and advocate of the Palestinian cause. His novels and literary criticism have been translated into several languages. In 2000, he won the Prize of Palestine for his book Gate of the Sun, and he won the Al Owais Award for fiction writing in 2007. Khoury also wrote three plays and two screenplays.

From 1993 to 2009, Khoury served as an editor of Al-Mulhaq, the weekly cultural supplement of the Lebanese daily newspaper Al-Nahar. He also taught at universities in Middle Eastern and European countries, and the United States.

The ongoing struggles of Palestinians under occupation was a theme in much of his work.

== Biography ==
=== Early life ===
Elias Khoury was born in 1948 into a middle-class Greek Orthodox family in the predominantly Christian Ashrafiyye district of Beirut, Lebanon.

He began reading Lebanese novelist Jurji Zaydan's works at the age of eight, which he later said taught him more about Islam and his Arabic background. In 1966, he earned his high school diploma from al-Ra'i al-Saleh High School in Beirut. At the time he graduated, Lebanese intellectual life was becoming more polarized, with opposition groups adopting pro-Palestinian, radical Arab nationalist stances. The following year, in 1967, a 19-year-old Khoury traveled to Jordan, where he visited a Palestinian refugee camp and enlisted in Fatah, the largest resistance organization in the Palestinian Liberation Organisation. He left Jordan after thousands of Palestinians were killed or expelled in the wake of an attempted coup against King Hussein, in Black September.

Khoury studied history at the Lebanese University and graduated in 1970. In 1973, he received his PhD in social history at the University of Paris.

=== Involvement in the Lebanese civil war ===
At the start of the Lebanese civil war, Khoury became a member of the Lebanese National Movement, an alliance of leftist, pan-Arab parties with mostly Muslim supporters. He was injured during the war, and temporarily blinded.

=== Personal life and death ===
Khoury and his wife, Najla, had two children. After a period of declining health, he died at a hospital in Beirut on 15 September 2024, at the age of 76.

== Career ==
=== Literary career ===
Khoury published his first novel in 1975, On the Relations of the Circle (Arabic: عن علاقات الدائرة). It was followed in 1977 by The Little Mountain (Arabic: الجبل الصغير), set during the Lebanese Civil War, a conflict that Khoury initially thought would be a catalyst for progressive change. Other works by him include The Journey of Little Gandhi, about a rural immigrant to Beirut who lives through the events of the civil war; and Gate of the Sun (2000), an epic re-telling of the life of Palestinian refugees in Lebanon since the 1948 Palestinian expulsion and flight. The book, which addresses the ideas of memory, truth, and storytelling, was adapted as a film of the same name by Egyptian director Yousry Nasrallah (2002).

In an interview by the Israeli newspaper Yediot Aharonot, after the publication of the Hebrew translation of Gate of the Sun, Khoury remarked:

"When I was working on this book, I discovered that the "other" is the mirror of the I. And given that I am writing about half a century of Palestinian experience, it is impossible to read this experience otherwise than in the mirror of the Israeli "other." Therefore, when I was writing this novel, I put a lot of effort into trying to take apart not only the Palestinian stereotype but also the Israeli stereotype as it appears in Arab literature and especially in the Palestinian literature of Ghassan Kanafani, for example, or even of Emil Habibi. The Israeli is not only the policeman or the occupier, he is the "other," who also has a human experience, and we need to read this experience. Our reading of their experience is a mirror to our reading of the Palestinian experience."

Khoury's novel Yalo (2002, translated into English in 2008 by the American translator Peter Theroux) depicted a former militiaman accused of crimes during Lebanon's civil war. He described the use of torture in the Lebanese judicial system. The title refers to the name of a Palestinian Arab village that was annexed by Israel during the 1967 war and later destroyed. All the inhabitants were expelled and most went to Jordan. Kirkus Reviews described the book as a "deceptively intricate" story and an "unsparing portrayal of a man without a country, a history or even an identity."

Khoury's novels are notable for their complex approach to political themes and fundamental questions of human behavior. His narrative technique often involves an interior monologue, at times approaching a stream of consciousness. In recent works he tended to use a considerable element of colloquial Arabic, although the language of his novels remains primarily Modern Standard Arabic. While use of dialect in dialogue is relatively common in modern Arabic literature (for example, in the work of Yusuf Idris), Khoury also used it in the main narrative, which is unusual in contemporary literature. Khoury explained this choice by saying, "As long as the official, written language is not opened to the spoken language it is a total repression because it means that the spoken, social experience is marginalised."

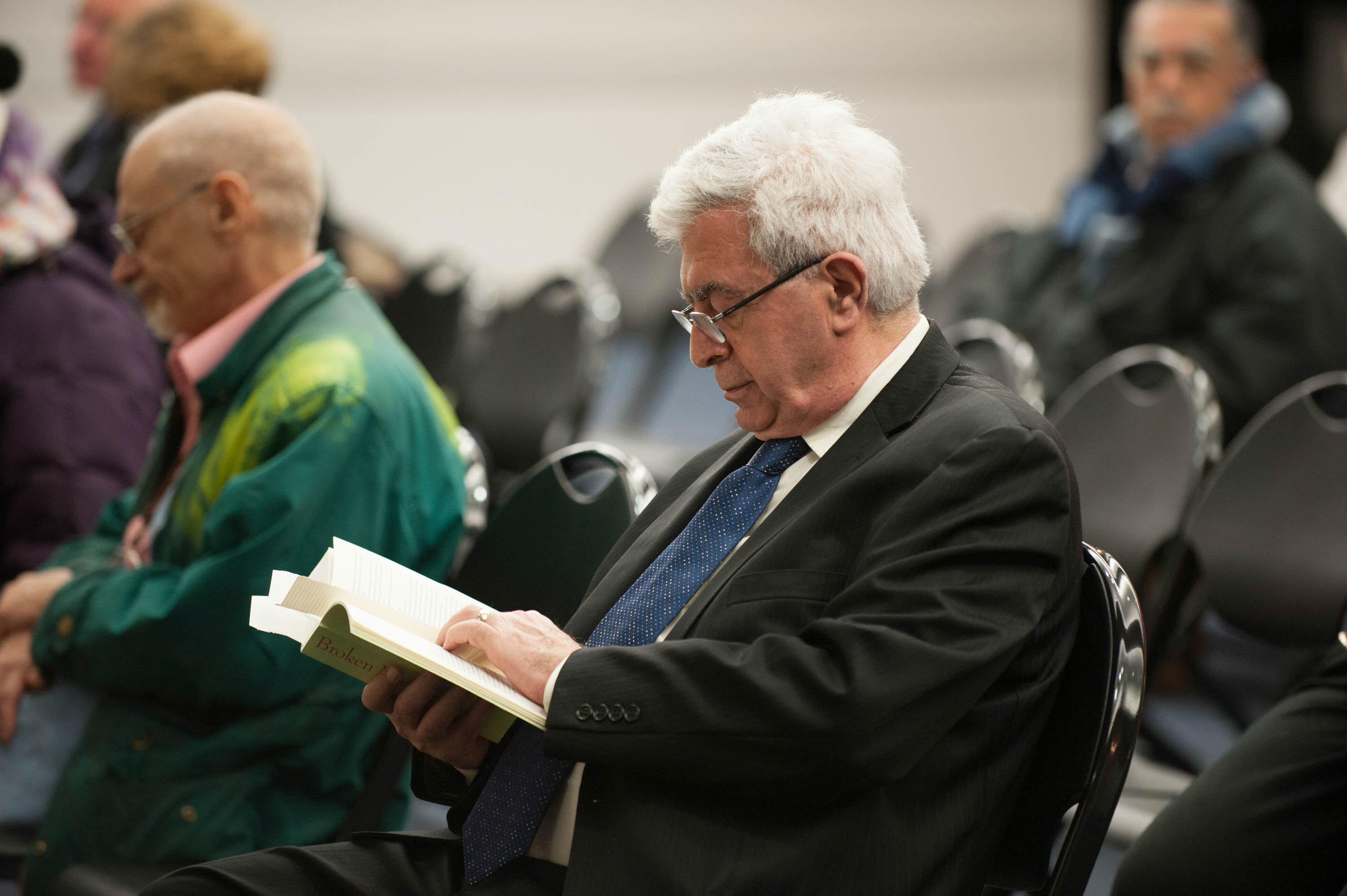
Europe Meets the Arab World with Khoury and Jocelyne Cesari, at Boston University Photonics Center

In addition to his novels, Khoury also served in several editorial positions, starting in 1972 when he joined the editorial board of the journal Mawaqif. He served as the editor of the Palestine Liberation Organization's magazine Shu'un Filastiniyya (Palestinian Affairs Magazine) from 1975 to 1979 in collaboration with Mahmoud Darwish. Between 1980 and 1985, Khoury worked as an editor of the series Thakirat Al-Shu'ub, published by the Arab Research Foundation in Beirut. In the 1980s, he was the editorial director first of Al Karmel magazine, and then of the cultural section of Al-Safir. Khoury also worked as the technical director of Beirut Theater from 1992 to 1998, and was a co-director of the Ayloul Festival of Modern Arts.

From 1992 to 2009, Khoury edited Al-Mulhaq, the cultural supplement of the Lebanese daily newspaper Al-Nahar. Under his leadership, the magazine criticized controversial aspects of Lebanon's post-Civil War reconstruction, which was led by former Lebanese prime minister Rafic Hariri. In a 2019 article, Khaled Saghieh wrote that Al-Mulhaq was "foundational in launching the debate over memory that would occupy a wide portion of the Lebanese cultural scene in the 1990s."

Khoury's works have been translated and published in Catalan, Dutch, English, French, German, Hebrew, Italian, Portuguese, Romanian, Norwegian, Spanish, and Swedish.

=== Academic career ===
Khoury taught at many universities, including New York University, University of Houston, Berkeley College, The University of Chicago, Columbia University, Georgetown University, the University of Minnesota, and Princeton University in the United States. He also taught at the University of Poitiers in France, the University of London in the UK, the University of Berlin in Germany, and the University of Zurich in Switzerland. In his home country Lebanon, he taught at the American University of Beirut, the Lebanese American University, and his alma mater, Lebanese University.

== Published works ==
Novels

- 1975: 'an 'ilaqat al-da'irah (عن علاقات الدائرة)
- 1977: al-Jabal al-saghir (الجبل الصغير); English translation: Little Mountain (1989, Maia Tabet)
- 1981: Abwab al-madinah (أبواب المدينة); English translation: The Gates of the City (1993, Paula Haydar)
- 1981: Wujuh al-bayda (الوجوه البيضاء); English translation: White Masks (2010, Maia Tabet)
- 1989: Rihlat Ghandi al-saghir (رحلة غاندي الصغير); English translation: The Journey of Little Gandhi (1994, Paula Haydar)
- 1990: Akaa wl Rahil (عكا و الرحيل); which was issued in Beirut.
- 1993: Mamlakat al-ghuraba (مملكة الغرباء); English translation: The Kingdom of Strangers (1996, Paula Haydar)
- 1994: Majma' al-Asrar (مجمع الأسرار)
- 1998: Bab al-Shams (باب الشمس); English translation: Gate of the Sun (2006, Humphrey Davies)
- 2000: Ra'ihat al-Sabun (رائحة الصابون)
- 2002: Yalu (يالو); English translations: Yalo (2008, Peter Theroux), (2009, Humphrey Davies: short-listed for Best Translated Book Award)
- 2007: Ka-annaha na'imah (كأنها نائمة); English translations: As Though She Were Sleeping (2011, Humphrey Davies), (2012, Marilyn Booth)
- 2012: al-Maryia al-maksoura (المرايا المكسورة: سينالكول). English translation: Broken Mirrors: Sinocal (2012, Humphrey Davis)
- 2016: Awlad Al-Ghetto- Esme Adam (أولاد الغيتو- اسمي آدم); English translation: Children of the Ghetto: My Name is Adam (2018, Humphrey Davies)
- 2018: "Awlad Al-Ghetto 2: Najmat Elbaher" (أولاد الغيتو ٢: نجمة البحر); English translation: Children of the Ghetto: Star of the Sea (2024, Humphrey Davies)
- 2023: "Awlad Al-Ghetto 3: Rajulon yushbihuni" (أولاد الغيتو 3: رجلٌ يشبهني)

Story collections

- 1984: "Al-mubtada' wa'l-khabar", issued in Beirut.
- 1990: Al-lo'aba al-hakikiya(اللعبة الحقيقية); issued in Beirut.

Criticism

- 1979: Dirasat fi naqd al-shi'r
- 1982: Al-dhakira al-mafquda
- 1984: Tajribat al-ba'th 'an ufq
- 1985: Zaman al-ihtilal
- 2023: النكبة المستمرة (The Continuous Nakba), compilation of 12 essays and articles.

Plays

- 1993: Muthakarat Ayoub
- 1995: Habs al-Ramel (in collaboration with Rabih Mrouè)
- 2000: Thalathat Mulsakat (in collaboration with Rabih Mroué)

Screenplays

- 1992: Kharej al-Hayat (in collaboration with Maroun Baghdadi)
- 2002: Bab al-Shams (in collaboration with Yousry Nasrallah and Mohamed Soueid)

== Awards and honors ==
- 2000: Prize of Palestine for Bab al-Shams [Gate of the Sun]
- 2007: Al Owais Award for "Stories, Novels & Drama"
- 2008: Prix du roman arabe for Comme si elle dormait [As Though She Were Sleeping]
- 2016: Mahmoud Darwish Award for Creativity
