= Fadi Zaghmout =

Jordanian writer and blogger

Fadi Zaghmout (born 1978) is a Jordanian writer and blogger. He claims an MA in Creative Writing and Critical Thinking from the University of Sussex. Zaghmout is best-known for his debut novel Aroos Amman (2012) which was translated into English by Ruth Kemp. His works promote themes of gender equality, sexual equality, and social justice.

In 2024, Fadi Zaghmout received the Study UK Alumni Award in the Social Action category in the United Arab Emirates, recognising his contribution to social change through his writing and its social impact.

== Books ==
- عروس عمّان [Aroos Amman] (2012). The Bride of Amman, trans. Ruth Ahmedzai Kemp (Signal 8 Press, 2015)
- جنّة على الأرض [Janna ala al-ard] (2015). Heaven on Earth, trans. Sawad Hussain (Signal 8 Press, 2017)
- ليلى والحمل [Layla wal-hamal] (2018). Laila, trans. Hajer Almosleh (Signal 8 Press, 2020)
- إبرة وكشتبان [Ibra wa-kushtuban] (2021). The Man of Middling Height, trans. Wasan Abdelhaq (Syracuse University Press, 2025)
- أمل على الأرض [Amal ala al-ard] (2023). Hope on Earth
- فرح على الأرض [Farah ala al-ard] (2025). Joy on Earth
