= Sabri Mosbah =

Tunisian singer (born 1982)

Sabri Mosbah صبري مصباح
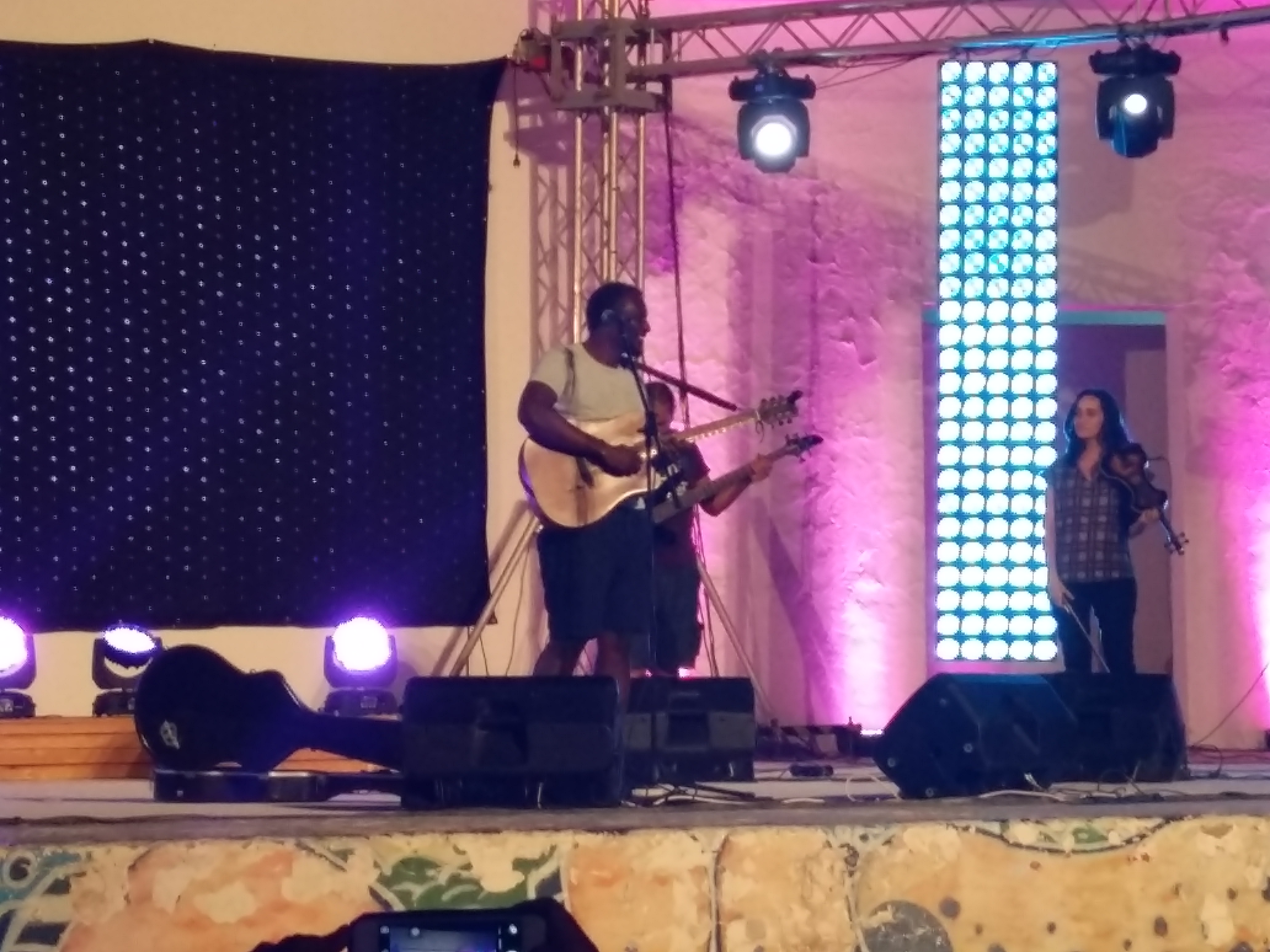
- Sabri Mosbah 2016

Background information
- Born: January 30, 1982 (age 44); Tunis, Tunisia
- Occupations: Singer, composer, guitarist
- Instrument: Guitar

Sabri Mosbah (Tunisian Arabic: صبري مصباح) (born January 30, 1982) is a Tunisian singer, composer and guitarist. He is the son of singer Slah Mosbah.

== Biography ==
Sabry was born and raised in Tunis, in Bardo to a family of Haratin origin. Radio France Internationale has called him "one of the ambassadors of a new musical path." He is singer composer and Guitarist. and the son of singer Slah Mosbah.

He launched his YouTube channel in 2015 with the Kitch’Session, videos in which he made various covers of Tunisian songs but also classics from the rock repertoire, such as Creep from Radiohead.

on November 24, 2017, Sabry Mosbah released his album "Mes Racines chez Accords Croisés".
