= Luay Abdul-Ilah =

Iraqi writer and translator (born 1949)

- لؤي عبد الإله
- Born: 1949 (age 76–77); Baghdad, Iraq
- Education: Baghdad University
- Occupation: Writer

Luay Abdul-Ilah (Arabic: لؤي عبد الإله; born 1949) is an Iraqi writer and translator. He was born in Baghdad and studied mathematics in Baghdad University. He has published several short story collections and a novel titled Divine Names (translated into English by Judy Cumberbatch). Living in London since 1985, he has worked for Al-Sharq Al-Awsat, SOAS and the University of Westminster.

== Notable works ==
- Crossing to the Other Shore (short stories collection)-1992
- Video dreams (short stories collection)-1996
- A Throw of the Dice(short stories collection)-1999
- The Game of Masks (short stories collection)-2015
- The Comedy of Divine Love (Novel)-2008
- Weightlessness (novel)-2023
