= Radwa Ashour =

Egyptian novelist (1946–2014)

- Born: 26 May 1946; El-Manial, Egypt
- Died: 30 November 2014 (aged 68); Cairo, Egypt
- Citizenship: Egyptian
- Education: Cairo University; University of Massachusetts
- Occupation: Novelist
- Spouse: Mourid Barghouti
- Children: Tamim al-Barghouti
- Writing career
- Language: Arabic, English
- Years active: 1967–2014
- Website: https://www.goodreads.com/radwaashour

Radwa Ashour (Arabic: رضوى عاشور) (26 May 1946 – 30 November 2014) was an Egyptian novelist.

== Life ==
Ashour was born in El-Manial to Mustafa Ashour, a lawyer and literature enthusiast, and Mai Azzam, a poet and an artist. She graduated from Cairo University with a BA degree in 1967. In 1972, she received her MA in Comparative Literature from the same university. In 1975, Ashour graduated from the University of Massachusetts Amherst with a PhD in African American Literature. Her dissertation was entitled The Search for a Black Poetics: A Study of Afro-American Critical Writings. While preparing for her PhD, Ashour was remarked as the program’s first doctoral candidate in English who studied the literature of African-American literature . She taught at Ain Shams University, Cairo. Between 1969 and 1980, Ashour's mainly focused on studying, raising her son and playing an active role as an activist. She married Palestinian poet Mourid Barghouti in 1970. She gave birth to her son, poet Tamim al-Barghouti, in 1977. In that same year, Ashour's husband, Mourid Barghouti was deported from Egypt to Hungary. As she and her son stayed in Cairo, they used to make frequent visits to Mourid.

From 1990 to 1993, she served as Chair of the Department of English Language and Literature in the Faculty of Arts at Ain Shams University, as well as teaching at the university and supervising research and dissertations related to her MA. degrees.

At the beginning of the third millennium, Ashour returned to the field of literary criticism, where she published a collection of works on the field of applied criticism, contributed to the Encyclopedia of the Arabic Writer (2004), and supervised the translation of the ninth part of the Cambridge Encyclopedia of Literary Criticism (2005).

Between 1999 and 2012 she published four novels and one collection of short stories, the most important of which are the novel Tanturia (2011) and Lady Young's collection of anecdotal reports.

In 2007 she was awarded the Constantine Kwavis International Literary Prize in Greece, and in 2008 she published an English translation of Mourid Barghouti's poetry anthology entitled Midnight and Other Poems.

Mourid Barghouti, Radwa Ashour's husband, wrote many letters and poems expressing his sincere feelings for her and she, in turn, also exchanged love letters with him.

Ashour died on 30 November 2014 after long-term health problems.

== Her academic and social work ==
Active member of the following organizations:

- Committee for the Protection of National Culture.
- National Committee for Resistance to Zionism in Egyptian Universities.
- On 9 March, a group for university independence.

In addition to her membership on a group of cultural and academic related arbitration committees:

- State Incentive Awards Committee
- Standing Committee of the High Council of Culture
- History Committee of the Supreme Council of Culture

== Tribute ==
On 26 May 2018, Google Doodle commemorated Radwa Ashour's 72nd birthday.

== Works ==
- The Journey: Memoirs of an Egyptian Student in America, 1983
- Warm Stone, 1985
- Khadija and Sawsan, 1989
- I Saw the Date Palms, short stories, 1989
- Siraj. Translated by Barbara Romaine. University of Texas Press. 2007. ISBN 978-0-292-71752-7.
- Granada: a novel. Translated by William Granara. Syracuse University Press. 2003. ISBN 978-0-8156-0765-6.
- Apparitions. 1998. Specters, Translated Barbara Romaine, Interlink Books, 2010, ISBN 978-1-56656-832-6
- Al-Tantouria, 2010. The Woman from Tantoura, Translated by Kay Heikkinen, American University in Cairo Press, 2014.
- Blue Lorries. Translated by Barbara Romaine. Bloomsbury Qatar Foundation Publishing. 2014. ISBN 978-99921-94-48-5.
- Athqal Min Radwa, 2013 ISBN 9789770932636
- li Kull Al Mqhoorin Ajnih'a, 2019
- Faraj.

=== As editor ===
- Encyclopaedia of Arab Women Writers, 1873–1999. American University in Cairo Press. 2008. ISBN 978-977-416-146-9.

== Awards ==
- In 1994, Granada Trilogy won the year award of the Cairo International Book Fair
- In 1995, Granada Trilogy won the prize of The First Arab Woman Book Fair in Cairo.
- In 2007, Ashour won Constantine Cavafy Prize for Literature
- In 2011, Ashour won Owais Prize.

== Translations of Ashour's Work ==
- Granada Trilogy was translated into Spanish and English
- Siraj was translated into English.
- Atyaaf was translated into Italian.
- She has a number of short stories that were published in English, French, Italian, German and Spanish.
- Al-Tantouria has been published in English

Translated in Tamil by Dr. P. M. M. Irfan, August 2021
