= Yasser Abdel Hafez =

Egyptian novelist and journalist (born 1969)

Yasser Abdel Hafez (Arabic: ياسر عبد الحفيظ; born 1969) is an Egyptian novelist and journalist. He was born in Cairo and studied law at Ain Shams University. He has worked as a journalist for the Arabic-language literary journal Akhbar al-Adab for more than 20 years. Abdel Hafez's most notable work is his novel On the Occasion of Life, published in 2005. Excerpts from this novel have been translated into English and were published in Banipal magazine in 2006, in an issue devoted to new writing in Egypt. He has recently finished his last novel " كتاب الامان" "book of safety" which was published in 2013, the novel isn't translated to English yet but will be soon. He is married to the writer and novelist Mansoura Ez Eldin.
