= Bahaa Taher =

Egyptian novelist (1935–2022)

- بهاء طاهر
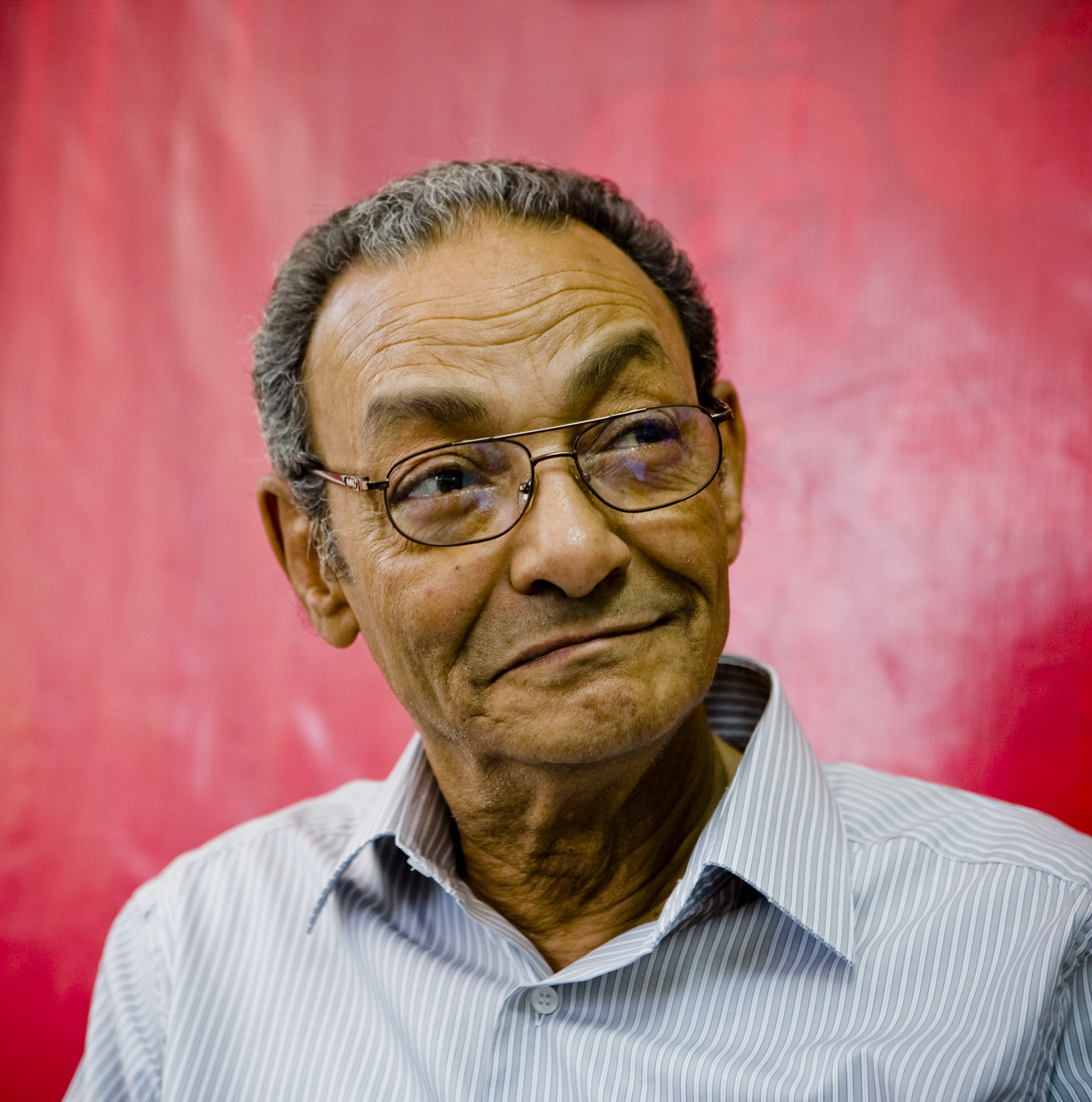
- Bahaa Taher in 2009
- Born: 13 January 1935; Giza, Kingdom of Egypt
- Died: 27 October 2022 (aged 87); Cairo, Egypt
- Education: University of Cairo
- Occupation: Writer
- Writing career
- Language: Arabic Language
- Genre: Novels
- Notable awards: International Prize for Arabic Fiction(IPAF) (2008)

Bahaa Taher (Arabic: بهاء طاهر; 13 January 1935 – 27 October 2022), sometimes transliterated as Bahaa Tahir, Baha Taher, or Baha Tahir, was an Egyptian novelist and short story writer who wrote in Arabic. He was awarded the inaugural International Prize for Arabic Fiction in 2008.

== Biography ==
Taher was born in Giza Governorate on 13 January 1935, with roots from Luxor in Upper Egypt. He had a bachelor's degree in history, literature faculty in 1956, then a postgraduate diploma in media from the University of Cairo in 1973. He was one of the Egyptian artists who contributed to the avant-garde literary magazine Galerie 68. Upon being banned from writing in 1975, he left Egypt and travelled widely in Africa and Asia seeking work as a translator. During the 1980s and 1990s he lived in Switzerland, where he worked as a translator for the United Nations. Afterwards he returned to Egypt, where he continued to reside.

Taher died on 27 October 2022, at the age of 87.

== Novels ==
East of the Palms (1985) (Arabic: شرق النخيل) His first novel was published in serialized form.

Qalat Duha (1985) (Arabic: قالت ضحى)

Aunt Safiyya and the Monastery (1991) (Arabic: خالتي صفية والدير) His third novel, set in Upper Egypt, concerns a blood feud as a result of which a young Muslim man, fleeing vengeance, finds sanctuary in a Coptic monastery.

Love in Exile (1995) (Arabic: الحب في المنفى) His fourth novel deals with the massacre of Palestinians at the Sabra and Shatila refugee camps in Lebanon in 1982.

The Point of Light (2001) (Arabic: نقطة النور)

Sunset Oasis (2007) (Arabic: واحة الغروب) His sixth novel is set in 19th century Egypt at the beginning of the British occupation of the country. The protagonist of the book is a nationalist Egyptian police officer who suffers from an existential crisis.

== Translations ==
- Aunt Safiyya and the Monastery has been translated into ten languages, including the 1996 English translation by Barbara Romaine.
- Love in Exile was translated into English by Farouk Abdel Wahab, the pen name of Farouk Mustafa. The translation was published by American University in Cairo Press in 2001 and later reissued by Arabia Books.
- Qalat Doha (As Doha Said) was translated by Peter Daniel and published by the American University in Cairo Press in 2008.
- Sunset Oasis was translated into English by Humphrey Davies and was published in the UK in 2009 by Sceptre.
- Sunset Oasis was translated into Norwegian by Unn Gyda Næss and is published by Vigmostad og Bjørke. Norwegian title: "Der solen går ned", ISBN 978-82-419-0583-4.
- Aunt Safiyya and the Monastery was translated into Georgian by Zviad Tskhvetiani and is published by წიგნები ბათუმში. Georgian title: დეიდა საფია და მონასტერი, ISBN 978-9941-474-10-1.

== Awards ==
- 1998 State Award of Merit in Literature, which is Egypt's highest literary award.
- 2000 Italian Giuseppe Acerbi Prize for Aunt Safiyya and the Monastery.
- 2008 International Prize for Arabic Fiction for Sunset Oasis. He is the first winner of this prize.

== Political views ==
In his youth he was involved in left wing causes, and was a supporter of Gamal Abdel Nasser’s development program for Egypt. He felt that Anwar El Sadat’s ending of this policy has been a disaster for Egypt. He called himself a pan-Arabist, but he said that he did not see much good in the Arab regimes of today. He felt that Westerners want to see exoticism, gender discrimination, and problems between minorities in the works of Arab writers, but he refused to comply with these stereotypes.
