= Tamim al-Barghouti =

Palestinian-Egyptian writer and political scientist (born 1977)

- تميم البرغوثي
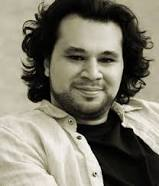
- Tamim al-Barghouti
- Born: June 13, 1977 (age 49); Cairo, Egypt
- Education: Cairo University (BA) American University in Cairo (MA) Boston University (Ph.D. 2004)
- Occupations: Poet, Writer, Political scientist
- Writing career
- Language: Arabic
- Period: 1990s–present
- Genres: Poetry, Political Literature
- Notable work: "In Jerusalem and Other Poems"

Tamim Al-Barghouti (Arabic: تميم البرغوثي, born 13 June 1977) is a Palestinian-Egyptian poet, columnist and political scientist. Nicknamed the "poet of Jerusalem" (شاعر القدس), he is one of the most widely read poets in the Arab World. He received his PhD degree in political science from Boston University in 2004. He grew up in a family interested in Arabic literature. His father was the Palestinian poet Mourid Barghouti from the Deir Ghassana village, and his mother is the Egyptian novelist and political writer Radwa Ashour.

== Life ==
Tamim al-Barghouti was born in Cairo in 1977. He is the son of Palestinian writer and poet Mourid al-Barghouti and the Egyptian writer, Radwa Ashour. Around the time of Tamim's birth, Egypt was in peace talks with Israel that led to the Camp David Accords in 1979. President Anwar Sadat then banished most prominent Palestinian figures from Egypt, including Tamim's father, Mourid al-Barghouti, when Tamim was five months old. He would go with his mother to visit his exiled father living in Budapest on vacations. Tamim cited his separation from his father as formational of his interest in political science.

His interest in literature began around the age of 12 or 13 with an abridged version of Abu al-Faraj al-Isfahani's Kitab al-Aghani. He then read a commentary on the Seven Long Mu'allaqat, Ibn Abd Rabbih's Al-ʿIqd al-Farīd and Al-Mubarrad's Kitãb al-Kāmil fi-l-Lugha wa-l-Adab (Arabic: الكامل في اللغة والأدب (كتاب)).

In his youth he also met and was influenced by figures such as Emile Habibi, Mahmoud Darwish, Saadi Youssef, Saadallah Wannous, Ahmed Fouad Negm, and Abdel Rahman el-Abnudi. Later on he associated with poets of a younger generation, including Amin Haddad, Bahaa Gahin and Ibn Amin Ahmed.

Tamim al-Barghouthi wrote his first poem, "Allah Yahdiha Falastīn" (الله يهديها فلسطين) in colloquial Palestinian Arabic when he was 18 years old. He published his first diwan, or book of poetry, entitled Mijna (ميجنا)—also in colloquial Palestinian Arabic—in 1999 when he was 22. His second poetry collection, entitled el-Munzir (المُنْظِر), was published the following year in Egyptian colloquial Arabic.

In 1999, Tamim al-Barghouthi earned a bachelor's degree in political science from the College of Economics and Political Science at Cairo University. He then earned a master's degree in politics and international relations from The American University in Cairo.

On the eve of the American invasion of Iraq in 2003, he left Egypt in protest of its position on the invasion. Between 2003 and 2004 he worked as a columnist at The Daily Star in Lebanon, writing on Arab culture, history, and identity. He has then worked for the United Nations at the Division for Palestinian Rights, the Department of Political and Peacebuilding Affairs, and in 2005 and 2006 at the UN Mission in Sudan.

He earned a Ph.D. in political science from Boston University in 2004.

He wrote two poems that garnered him popular and critical acclaim: the first was "'Kaluli: Bathab Masr?" (قالولي: بتحب مصر؟ "They Asked Me: Do you love Egypt?") written in Egyptian colloquial Arabic, and the second was "Maqām 'Iraq" (مَقامُ عِراق "Maqam of Iraq") in Standard Arabic in 2005.

He taught political science as an assistant professor at the American University in Cairo. In 2007, he became a fellow at the Berlin Institute for Advanced Study. He also worked as a visiting professor at Free University of Berlin and Georgetown University in Washington DC.

In 2004, he wrote the critically acclaimed poem "Fi l-Qudsi" (في القدس "In Jerusalem"). In 2007 the poem went viral as he read it in the poetry competition Amir-Al-Shu'arā]]' (أمير الشعراء Prince of the Poets). "In Jerusalem and Other Poems" was his first poetry collection translated into English.

Tamim Al Bargouthi has shown his support for Palestinian people's right to resist occupation and apartheid in many of his videos and statements, most recently a video titled "its liberation... has begun". he has also denounced the Palestinian authority.

In February 2021, Tamim's father, renowned Palestinian poet Mourid Barghouti, died at the age of 76 in the Jordanian capital Amman, after spending most of his life in exile..

He has a series of short cultural videos on AJ+ in Arabic called Ma'a Tamim (مع تميم) in which he recites original poetry or discusses themes in literature, art, and history.

He delivered a speech at the closing ceremony of the 2022 FIFA World Cup in Qatar.

He set a version of the Epic of Gilgamesh in Arabic verse (ملحمة جلجامش), which he performed in March 2023 in Doha at the TEDinArabic Summit, a collaboration between TED and the Qatar Foundation, and in November 2025 at the Sheldonian Theatre in Oxford.

== Selected works ==
=== Academic works ===
- The Umma and Dawla: The Nation-State and the Arab Middle East. London: Pluto Press. 2008.
- "الوطنية الأليفة" [Benign Nationalism]. Political Science-Middle East History (in Arabic). Cairo: The Centre of Contemporary Egyptian History of the Egyptian National Library. 2007.
- Davis, Rochelle; Kirk, Mimi, eds. (2013). "War, Peace, Civil War: a Pattern?". Palestine and the Palestinians in the 21st century. Bloomington: Indiana University Press.
- Shahin, Emad El-Din, ed. (2014). "The Post-Colonial State: The Impossible Compromise". The Oxford Encyclopedia of Islam and Politics. Oxford University Press.
- Shehadeh, Raja; Johnson, Penny, eds. (2015). "Cracking Cauldrons". Shifting Sands: the Unraveling of the Old Order in the Middle East. London: Profile Books.

=== Poetry collections ===
- Ya Masr Hanet. Dar Al-Shorouk. 2011.
- Fi Al-Quds. Cairo: Dar Al-Shorouk. 2008.
- Maqam Iraq. Cairo: Dar Atlas. 2005.
- Qalu li Bethebb Masr. Cairo: Dar el-Shourouk. 2002.
- Al-Manzhar. Cairo: Dar el-Shourouk. 2002.
- Mijana. Ramallah: Palestinian House of Poetry. 1999.
