= Akhbar Al-Adab =

Arabic literary magazine

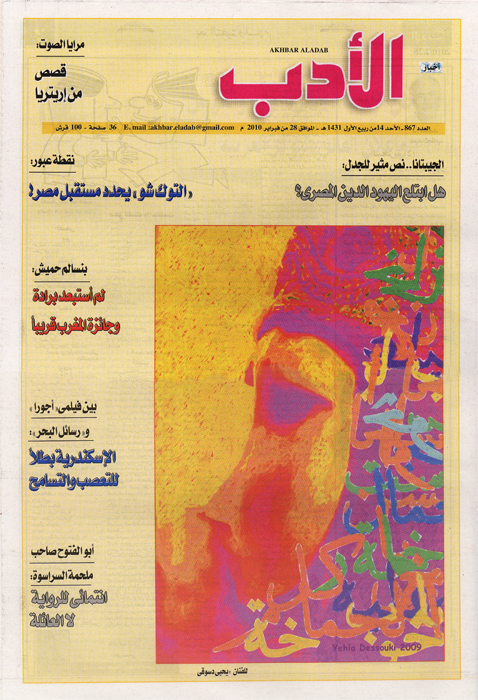
- February 2010 issue
- Editor-in-chief: Magdi Afifi
- Categories: Literary magazine
- Frequency: Weekly
- Publisher: Akhbar Al Yawm
- Founded: 1993; 32 years ago
- Country: Egypt
- Based in: Cairo
- Language: Arabic

Akhbar Al Adab (Arabic: أخبار الأدب; Cultural News in English) is an Arabic weekly literary magazine which is published by state-run Akhbar Al Yawm publishing house.

== History and profile ==
Akhbar Al Adab was established by Gamal Al-Ghitani in 1993 as a platform for Egyptian and Arab literary production. Since then it has been published by Akhbar Al Yawm publishing house on Sundays. The company also publishes Al Akhbar newspaper. The headquarters is in Cairo.

The magazine features articles on literary work as well as interviews.

From its creation in 1993 to January 2011 Gamal Al-Ghitani served as the editor-in-chief of the magazine and he was replaced by Mustafa Abdullah in the post. However, the journalists of the magazine demanded his removal as the editor-in-chief. In May 2011, Abla al-Roweiny was chosen by the journalists as the editor-in-chief of the weekly. In August 2013 Magdi Afifi was appointed editor-in-chief.

Editor-in-chief Tarek el-Taher and author Ahmed Naji were acquitted on 2 January 2016 on charges they had published indecent material in Naji's novel, The Use of Life, which Akhbar Al-Adab published in August 2014.

Yasser Abdel Hafez and Hassan Abdel Mawgoud are among the contributors. Palestinian author Fadwa Al Qasem published her short stories in the magazine.

== See also ==
- List of magazines in Egypt
