= Abdelilah Hamdouchi =

Moroccan writer

Abdelilah Hamdouchi (born 1958) is a Moroccan writer. He was born in Meknes.

Hamdouchi is a prolific writer of crime thrillers, several of which have been translated into English.

He lives in Rabat.

== Selected works ==
- Whitefly, translated by Jonathan Smolin
- The Final Bet, translated by Jonathan Smolin
- Bled Dry, translated by Benjamin Smith
