= Eslam Mosbah =

Egyptian novelist

Eslam Mosbah (born 1984) is an Egyptian novelist. He is best known for his 2011 novel Status: Emo which was described by Alaa Al Aswany as one of the best Arabic novels of the decade. It has since been translated into English by Raphael Cohen.
