= Mourid Barghouti =

Palestinian poet and writer (1944–2021)

Mourid Barghouti مريد البرغوثي
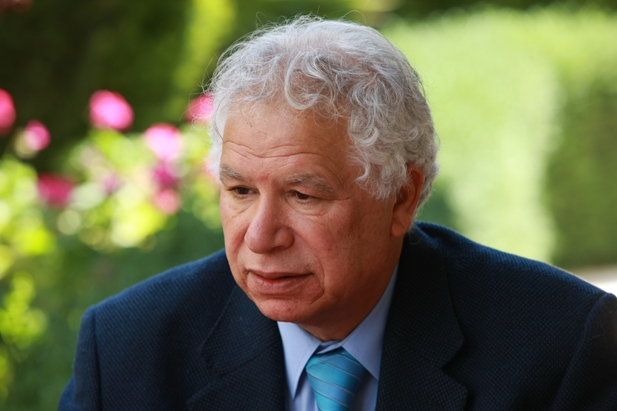

Personal details
- Born: 8 July 1944 Deir Ghassana, Mandatory Palestine
- Died: 14 February 2021 (aged 76) Amman, Jordan
- Children: Tamim al-Barghouti

Mourid Barghouti (Arabic: مريد البرغوثي, Murīd al-Barghūthī; 8 July 1944 – 14 February 2021) was a Palestinian poet and writer.

== Biography ==
Barghouti was born in Deir Ghassana, near Ramallah, on the West Bank, in 8 July 1944. He studied English literature at Cairo University, graduating in 1967, though he was exiled from Egypt in 1977.

The Oslo Accords finally allowed Barghouti to return to the West Bank, and in 1996 he was able to return to Ramallah after 30 years of exile. This event inspired his autobiographical novel Ra'aytu Ram Allah (I Saw Ramallah), published by Dar Al Hilal (Cairo, 1997), which won him the Naguib Mahfouz Medal for Literature in the same year. A follow-up, I Was Born There, I Was Born Here was written when he and his son, Tamim, made a visit to the city. Mourid is also widely respected and known for his beautiful poetry, such as his long poem in Midnight and Other Poems, and has among other awards received the Palestine Award for Poetry, in 2020.

In an interview with Maya Jaggi in The Guardian, Barghouti was quoted as saying: "I learn from trees. Just as many fruits drop before they're ripe, when I write a poem I treat it with healthy cruelty, deleting images to take care of the right ones." In an interview with Tahrir Hamdi, Barghouti was quoted again on poetry saying "Love and poetry are made of the highest degree of attention. If you love someone (...) you have to notice. The highest degree of noticing, this is life and this is poetry.

In terms of his political outlook, Barghouti was a vocal critic of the 1993 Oslo Accords and its negotiators, viewing the treaty as an attempt to eradicate any means of Palestinian self-determination and statehood. He also expressed dissatisfaction with the corruption of the late PLO's leadership. He commented disparagingly about the increase in Israeli settlements within the West Bank and its ability to pursue such policies in defiance of international law, whereas Palestinians are deprived of the right to resist such actions, further compounded by the ineptness of the Palestinian Authority to act. He cites these developments as the being the demise of the two-state solution.

Barghouti was married to the novelist Radwa Ashour since 1970, whom he met while studying at Cairo University. The couple had a son, the poet Tamim Barghouti. Barghouti died in Amman on 14 February 2021, aged 76.

== Bibliography ==
English translations:

- Midnight and Other Poems, translated by Radwa Ashour, ARC Publications, UK, October 2008, ISBN 1-904614-68-X, ISBN 978-1-904614-68-5
- I Was Born There, I Was Born Here, Bloomsbury, 2011
- I Saw Ramallah Random House, Anchor Books, 2003-05-13 ISBN 1-4000-3266-0 and Bloomsbury, UK, ISBN 0-7475-7470-7 and the American University in Cairo Press (January 2003), ISBN 978-977-424-755-2
- A Small Sun, Poems translated by Radwa Ashour and W. S. Merwin, Aldeburgh Poetry Trust, 2003 paperback, Suffolk, UK, ISBN 0-9535422-2-X
- Contributor to A New Divan: A Lyrical Dialogue Between East and West. ISBN 9781909942288

Spanish translations:

- Medianoche (poetry), translated by Luis Miguel Canada, published by Fundacion Antonio Perez. UCLM, Cuenca, Spain, 2006, ISBN 84-8427-494-2 and ISBN 978-84-8427-494-0
- He visto Ramala, translated by Iñaki Gutierrez de Teran, published by Ediciones del oriente y del mediterraneo, Guadarrama, Spain, 2002, ISBN 84-87198-83-X and ISBN 978-84-87198-83-0
