= American University in Cairo Press =

Academic publisher

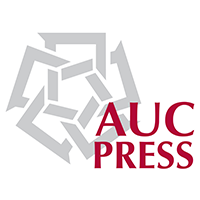
- Parent company: American University in Cairo
- Status: Active
- Founded: 1960; 66 years ago
- Country of origin: Egypt
- Headquarters location: Cairo
- Distribution: self-distributed (Egypt); Ingram Content Group (North America); Bloomsbury Publishing (rest of world)
- Publication types: Books
- Official website: aucpress.com

The American University in Cairo Press (AUCP, AUC Press) is the leading English-language publisher in the Middle East.

AUC Press is the largest translator of Arabic literature in the world. They are the publisher of the Nobel prize winning Egyptian novelist, Naguib Mahfouz.

The press is currently a member of the Association of University Presses.

== History ==
The American University in Cairo Press was founded in 1960. It is an independent publisher with close ties to the American University in Cairo (AUC). Its offices are in the heart of the Egyptian capital, overlooking the historic downtown landmark, Tahrir Square.

Its first publications in 1961 were K.A.C. Creswell’s A Bibliography of the Architecture, Arts and Crafts of Islam, (AUC Press, 1961), Otto F.A. Meinardus’s Monks and Monasteries of the Egyptian Deserts (AUC Press, 1961), Edward B. Savage's The Rose and the Vine: A Study of the Evolution of the Tristan and Isolt Tale in Drama (AUC Press, 1961), and George Scanlon’s A Muslim Manual of War (AUC Press, 1961).

== Mission ==
Considered "the leading English-language publishing house in the Middle East", its goals and purposes reflect and support the mission of the AUC in education, research, and cultural exchange, through professional publishing programs and international bookselling services.

Originally an academic publisher, AUC Press now publishes Arabic fiction translated into English. In 2016, AUC Press launched a new fiction imprint called Hoopoe.

== Publishing programs ==
Today the AUC Press publishes books in twelve broad categories:

- Arabic Language Learning
- Archaeology and Ancient Egypt
- Art & Architecture
- Business, Economics, and Environmental Studies
- Coptic and Islamic Studies
- Egypt Guidebooks
- Fiction in Translation
- History
- Literary Criticism
- Middle East Studies
- Middle East Travel
- Naguib Mahfouz

It publishes annually up to 50 wide-ranging academic texts and general interest books for distribution worldwide. It also maintains a backlist of more than 600 high-quality scholarly, literary, and general interest publications. Through its own bookstores and other retailers in Egypt, along with its distributors abroad, namely Ingram Content Group and Bloomsbury Publishing, the AUC Press sells its books in every major book market around the world and through major online retailers, including Amazon. The AUC Press also sells e-books and licenses foreign editions of its publications in many languages.

== Fiction in Translation ==
In 1978 the AUC Press translated and published Naguib Mahfouz's novel, Miramar―the first of his novels to be translated into English. The translation of Miramar resulted in the creation of the new Arabic Fiction in Translation program. Today it is a significant contributor to the translation, distribution, and promotion of modern Arabic fiction, with over 145 Arabic fiction titles by more than 65 authors from 12 countries, to English-speaking readers. This includes works of the late Nobel laureate Naguib Mahfouz and internationally acclaimed author Alaa Al Aswany.

== Naguib Mahfouz ==
In December 1985, three years before Naguib Mahfouz won the Nobel Prize for Literature, the AUC Press signed a comprehensive publishing agreement with the Egyptian writer, thus becoming his primary English-language publisher as well as his worldwide agent for all translation rights, publishing all of his novels in English and licensing numerous editions in other languages. His most translated novel, Midaq Alley, has appeared in more than 30 foreign editions in 15 languages.

Since it first introduced Mahfouz's novels in English, the AUC Press has published 43 volumes of his writing, including a collection of his Life’s Wisdom, an anthology of his thought and philosophy, Heart of the Night (2011) and Love in the Rain (2011). The AUC Press has also licensed some 600 foreign-language editions of Mahfouz's works in 40 languages.

=== The Naguib Mahfouz Medal for Literature ===
As a tribute to the acclaimed Egyptian writer and the rich literary heritage of the region, in 1996 the AUC Press established the Naguib Mahfouz Medal for Literature, a major award in support of contemporary Arabic literature in translation.

The award, consisting of a silver medal and a cash prize, as well as the translation and publication of the winning novel throughout the English-speaking world, is presented annually on 11 December, the birthday of Naguib Mahfouz.

=== Winners of the Naguib Mahfouz Medal for Literature ===
The 24 winners of the Naguib Mahfouz Medal for Literature so far include 10 women, 14 men; 12 Egyptians (2 posthumously), 3 Palestinians, 1 Algerian, 2 Lebanese, 1 Moroccan, 2 Syrians, 1 Iraqi, 1 Sudanese, and 1 Saudi Arabian.

Previous winners

- 1996: Ibrahim Abdel Meguid, The Other Place; and Latifa al-Zayyat, The Open Door
- 1997: Mourid Barghouti, I Saw Ramallah; and Yusuf Idris, City of Love and Ashes
- 1998: Ahlam Mosteghanemi, Memory in the Flesh
- 1999: Edwar al-Kharrat, Rama and the Dragon
- 2000: Hoda Barakat, The Tiller of Waters
- 2001: Somaya Ramadan, Leaves of Narcissus
- 2002: Bensalem Himmich, The Polymath
- 2003: Khairy Shalaby, The Lodging House
- 2004: Alia Mamdouh, The Loved Ones
- 2005: Yusuf Abu Rayya, Wedding Night
- 2006: Sahar Khalifeh, The Image, the Icon, and the Covenant
- 2007: Amina Zaydan, Red Wine
- 2008: Hamdi Abu Golayyel, A Dog with No Tail
- 2009: Khalil Sweileh, The Scribe of Love
- 2010: Miral al-Tahawy, Brooklyn Heights
- 2011: Awarded to "the revolutionary creativity of the Egyptian people"
- 2012: Ezzat el Kamhawi, House of the Wolf
- 2013: Khaled Khalifa, No Knives in this City's Kitchens
- 2014: Hammour Ziada, Shawq al-darwish (The Longing of the Dervish)
- 2015: Hassan Daoud, La Tareeq Ila Al-Jannah ('No Road to Paradise')
- 2016: Adel Esmat, Hikayat Yusuf Tadrus ('The Tales of Yusuf Tadrus', 'حكايات يوسف تادرس')
- 2017: Huzama Habayeb, Velvet 'مُخْمَل'
- 2018: Omaima Al-Khamis, Voyage of the Cranes in the Cities of Agate

== Arabic Language Learning ==
With an expanding collection of more than 30 textbooks for class and self-learning, such as the frequently-used Media Arabic and the Kallimni ‘Arabi series, the AUC Press also has one of the largest selection of Arabic-language textbooks for students of Modern Standard Arabic and Egyptian Arabic.

== Book Awards ==
The following AUC Press publications won awards:

Moon over Samarqand, a novel by Mohamed Mansi Qandil, translated by Jennifer Peterson (2009), the original Arabic edition won the 2006 Sawiris Foundation Award for Literature

The Lodging House, a novel by Khairy Shalaby (2008), translated by Farouk Mustafa (pen-name Farouk Abdel Wahab), winner of the 2007 Saif Ghobash‒Banipal Prize for Arabic Literary Translation Prize

Desert Songs: A Woman Explorer in Egypt and Sudan by Arita Baaijens (2008), nominated best photo travel book of 2008 by Dutch travel bookshops

The Collar and the Bracelet, a novel by Yahya Taher Abdullah (AUC Press, 2008), translated by Samah Selim, winner of the 2009 Saif Ghobash–Banipal Prize for Arabic Literary Translation

Cities without Palms, a novel by Tarek Eltayeb (AUC Press, 2009), translated by Kareem James Abu-Zeid, runner-up of the 2010 Saif Ghobash–Banipal Prize for Arabic Literary Translation

Specters, a novel by Radwa Ashour (AUC Press, 2010), translated by Barbara Romaine, runner-up of the 2011 Saif Ghobash‒Banipal Prize for Arabic Literary Translation

Ancient Nubia: African Kingdoms on the Nile (2012), “Best Archaeology & Anthropology Book,” PROSE Award by the Association of American Publishers.

== E-books ==
Since 2012, the AUC Press made available five backlist titles in electronic format: A Muslim Manual of War by George Scanlon, Islamic History through Coins: An Analysis and Catalogue of Tenth-Century Ikhshidid Coinage by Jere L. Bacharach, Al-Fustat: Its Foundation and Early Urban Development by Wladyslaw B. Kubiak, Ayyubid Cairo: A Topographical Study by Neil D. MacKenzie, and Writing Egypt: History, Literature, and Culture, edited by Aleya Serour. Today, it offers a large selection of e-books―new and backlist titles, ranging from Arabic fiction to travel books.

American University in Cairo Press joined The Association of American Publishers trade organization in the Hachette v. Internet Archive lawsuit which resulted in the removal of access to over 500,000 books from global readers.

== See also ==
- List of university presses
