= Three Novels of Ancient Egypt =

Three Novels of Ancient Egypt may refer to these English-language omnibuses:

- Three Novels of Ancient Egypt by Naguib Mahfouz, published by Everyman's Library (Khufu's Wisdom, Rhadopis of Nubia, and Thebes at War)
- Three Novels of Ancient Egypt by Wilbur Smith, published by Reader's Digest (River God, The Seventh Scroll, and Warlock)
