= Rhadopis of Nubia =

Book by Nagieb Mahfoez

First English-language edition

Rhadopis of Nubia is an early novel by the Egyptian writer Naguib Mahfouz. It was originally published in Arabic in 1943. An English translation by Anthony Calderbank appeared in 2003 published by American University in Cairo Press. The novel is one of several that Mahfouz wrote at the beginning of his career, with Pharaonic Egypt as their setting. Others in this series of novels include Khufu's Wisdom (1939) and Thebes at War (1944). All have been translated into English and appeared in one volume under the title Three Novels of Ancient Egypt (Everyman's Library, 2007).
