= Haggag Oddoul =

Egyptian writer

Haggag Hassan Oddoul (born 1944) is an Egyptian writer of Nubian descent, and a campaigner for the rights of the Nubian people.

== Life and work ==
He was born in Alexandria of Nubian parents who had left their impoverished native village. From 1963 to 1967, he was a construction worker on the Aswan Dam. Later, he served in the Egyptian Army, where he saw action in both the War of Attrition and the Yom Kippur War. He did not begin writing until the age of forty. His works have received several Egyptian literary awards, and he obtained government grants for the years 1996-1998 and 2002–2003, to complete his novels.

Most of his work attempts to preserve various aspects of the gradually disappearing Nubian culture and language. He is often regarded as one of a group of contemporary Nubian authors, the others being Idris Ali, Hasan Nur, and Yehya Mukhtar.

== Selected works ==
- Nights of Musk: Stories from Old Nubia, translated by Anthony Calderbank, American University in Cairo Press (2005) ISBN 978-977-424-894-8
- My Uncle Is On Labor, translated by Ahmed Fathy, Al-Hadara Publishing (2008) ISBN 978-977-5429-94-0
