= Zaat (novel) =

1992 novel by Sonallah Ibrahim

- Author: Sonallah Ibrahim
- Original title: ذات
- Translator: Anthony Calderbank
- Language: Arabic
- Publisher: Dār al-Mustaqbal al-ʻArabī, American University in Cairo Press
- Publication date: 1992
- Publication place: Egypt
- English publication date: 2001
- ISBN: 978-9-772-39027-4

Zaat: The Tale of One Woman's Life in Egypt During the Last Fifty Years (ذات) is a novel by Sonallah Ibrahim. The book was originally published in 1992. The English translation by Anthony Calderbank was published by the American University in Cairo Press in 2001. Hosam Aboul-Ela of the University of Houston wrote in 2001 that it was Ibrahim's "most celebrated novel to date". An excerpt is within the anthology The Anchor Book of Modern Arabic edited by Denys Johnson-Davies.

Sarah Hahn of The Middle East Journal wrote that the book was "[r]enowned for its black humor and ironic commentary on modern Egyptian life". It is about the life of Zaat, a woman from a lower middle class background. Zaat chronicles her relationships, the surrounding political climates, and her experiences. She lives through the governments of Gamal Abdel Nasser, Anwar Sadat, and Hosni Mubarak.

== Writing style ==
Newspaper headlines from current events are interspersed with the story, taking up the even-numbered chapters while the story itself is in the odd-numbered chapters. Aboul-Ela wrote that these newspaper articles break up the novel's main story, include distinct characters and themes, and have the role of "further reinforcing [the story's] fragmentation, its alinear structure, and the sense that [Zaat] is caught in forces larger than herself." The original Arabic version has a publisher's note located before the text stating that the newspaper articles are meant to highlight the atmosphere of Egypt during events within the story, and that the inclusions are not intended to infringe copyrights or to endorse the accuracy of the stories. The English version does not include this note.

== Characters ==
- Zaat – The main character. Her name means "self", or "essence." The idafa construction that means "possessor of [something]" uses dhât as the first term.
  - Instead of having a single beginning for Zaat the novel's text argued that any three points could be the start of her character: her birth, her first menstruation, and the wedding night. Hosam Aboul-Ela of the University of Houston wrote that therefore the work argues that the character "has been socially constructed, rather than appearing already whole as a product of biology." Aboul-Ela explained that her character reflects the trends of Egyptian culture and politics which "reinforces the notion that she is not a Dickensian or Stendhalian protagonist, who will grow and become complete over the course of the novel." He added that the concept of the three starting points is also an argument suggesting inadequacy with "the traditional realist notion of linear narrative". Aboul-Ela argued that Zaat "often seems to be written against the classic 19th-century European bildungsroman", and that the character does "not progress, grow, and learn enough over the course of the novel to make Zaat a bildungsroman."
- Himmat – One of Zaat's friends, Himmat and Zaat join forces to report to health authorities a grocer who sold Zaat expired olives
  - The names "Zaat" and "Himmat" combined form the name of the Abbasid princess dhât al-himma ("possessor of zeal").
- Abdel Maguid – Zaat's husband and the father of her three children. She states that she either has to leave him or she will end up pregnant again. He is controlling and believes himself to be very intelligent.

== Television adaptation ==
In 2012, Misr International Films ( MIF) was producing a television series based on Zaat. Filming of scenes set at Ain Shams University in Cairo was scheduled to occur that year, but Muslim Brotherhood student members and some teachers at the school protested, stating that the 1970s era clothing worn by the actresses was indecent and would not allow filming unless the clothing was changed. Gaby Khoury, the head of the film company, stated that engineering department head Sherif Hammad "insisted that the filming should stop and that we would be reimbursed ... explaining that he was not able to guarantee the protection of the materials or the artists."

The series aired in 2013 under the production of MIF and the collaboration of BBC Media Action.
