= Nancy N. Roberts =

Arabic-English translator and scholar

- Born: 1957 (age 67–68); Wichita, Kansas, U.S.
- Education: Western Kentucky University (B.A.Psychology and religious studies 1975-78); Indiana University Bloomington (M.S.Applied Linguistics 1981-79) (M.A.Arabic language and Literature 1991-1993)
- Occupation(s): Arabic-English Translator, Editor & Proofreader
- Notable work: Translation of Beirut ’75 by Ghada Samman (1995); Translation of The Man from Bashmour by Salwa Bakr (2007)
- Awards: University of Arkansas Translation Award (1994); Banipal Prize (2008)
- Website: nancyrobertsarabictoenglish.com

Nancy N. Roberts is a translator of Arabic literature. She won the University of Arkansas Translation Award for her translation of Ghada Samman's Beirut '75. She also received a commendation from the judges of the 2008 Banipal Prize for her translation of Salwa Bakr's The Man from Bashmour.

== Early life and education ==
She was born and raised in Wichita, Kansas. She completed her undergraduate studies in Psychology and religious studies at Western Kentucky University. Then she did a graduate degree in M.S.Applied linguistics from Indiana University Bloomington and went abroad. She lived in Lebanon for one year and five years in Kuwait and returned for about 7 years and she did M.A.Arabic language and Literature at Indiana University. She settled in Jordan and lived there from 1995 until 2015.

== Career ==
- Indiana University-Bloomington, associate instructor in English, 1980-81.
- American University of Beirut, Lebanon, instructor in English, 1981-82.
- Kuwait University, Kuwait City, instructor of English in College of Commerce, 1982-87.
- Earlham College, Richmond, IN, instructor in English as a second language, 1988-90.
- Indiana University-Bloomington, instructor in Arabic, 1991-93.
- AL al-Bayt University, Mafraq, Jordan, instructor in English as a second language, 1994-97.
- Federal Broadcasting Information Service, Jordan Bureau, translator, 1998-99.
- Free-lance translator, Amman, Jordan, 1999-.
- Mitchell Translations, translator from Arabic to English, 1994.

== Works ==
Selected Translations:

- Beirut ’75 by Ghada al-Samman
- Beirut Nightmares by Ghada al-Samman
- The Night of the First Billion by Ghada al-Samman
- Muntaha by Hala El-Badry
- Time of White Horses by Ibrahim Nasrallah
- Over the Bridge by Mohamed el-Bisatie
- Love in the Rain by Naguib Mahfouz
- The Mirage by Naguib Mahfouz
- The Man from Bashmour by Salwa Bakr
- House of the Wolf by Ezzat el Kamhawi

Roberts has also translated works on Islamic history, jurisprudence and Sufism. These include:

- The Jurisprudence of the Prophetic Biography, a translation of Fiqh al-Sirah al-Nabawiyyah (فقه السيرة النبوية) by Muhammad Sa'id Ramadan al-Buti
- Islamic Jurisprudence According to the Four Sunni Schools, Volume I: Modes of Islamic Worship by Abd al-Rahman Ibn Muhammad Awad al-Jaziri
- Apostasy in Islam by Taha Jabir Alalwani

== See also ==
- List of Arabic-English translators
