= Brooklyn Heights (disambiguation) =

Brooklyn Heights is the name of a neighborhood in New York City.

Brooklyn Heights may also refer to several other places in the United States:

- Brooklyn Heights Historic District, overlapping historic district in Brooklyn Heights
- Brooklyn Heights, Missouri, village in Jasper County, Missouri
- Brooklyn Heights, Ohio, village in Cuyahoga County, Ohio
- Brooklyn Heights, Los Angeles

It may also refer to these books:

- Brooklyn Heights (book)
- Brooklyn Heights: A Personal Memoir

== See also ==
- Brooklyn Heights Promenade
- Brooklyn Heights Railroad
- Brooke Lynn Hytes, Canadian drag queen
