= The City of Pleasure =

The City of Pleasure may refer to:

- The City of Pleasure (Bennett novel), a 1907 book by the British writer Arnold Bennett
- The City of Pleasure (Ezzat el Kamhawi novel), a 1997 book by Egyptian author Ezzat el Kamhawi
