= Amina Zaydan =

Egyptian novelist and short story writer (born 1966)

Amina Zaydan (Arabic: أمينة زيدان, romanized: Amīnah Zaydān; born 1966) is an Egyptian novelist and short story writer. She was born in 1966 in Suez and now lives in Cairo where she works as a civil servant.

In 1994, her short story collection It Happened Secretly won first prize in a literary competition held by Gamal al-Ghitani's Akhbar al-Adab weekly newspaper and Best Short Story Collection at the Cairo International Book Fair in 1995. Her second novel Red Wine won the Naguib Mahfouz Medal in 2007. An English translation of Red Wine by Sally Gomaa was published by the AUC Press in 2010.

Zaydan often writes about the Egyptian revolution of 1952 and its generational impact.

== Works ==
- Red Wine (Dar Al-Hilal Printing, 2007)
- Red Wine (translated into English, The American University in Cairo Press, 2010)
