= Yousef Al-Mohaimeed =

Saudi Arabian writer and journalist

- يوسف المحيميد
- Born: January 31, 1964 (age 62); Riyadh, Saudi Arabia
- Occupations: Journalist, writer

Yousef Al-Mohaimeed, (Arabic: يوسف المحيميد; born January 31, 1964, in Riyadh, Saudi Arabia) is a Saudi Arabian writer and journalist who has published several novels and short story collections in Arabic, and has been translated into English, Russian, Italian, Spanish and German.

== Life and work ==
Yousef Al-Mohaimeed was born on January 31, 1964, during the Islamic month of Ramadan in Riyadh, Saudi Arabia. He was the first boy born to the family after seven girls (three of whom had died). As a child, Yousef was often sick. After his youngest brother died of food poisoning, his mother became very protective of him.

His childhood illnesses would prove important in his development as a writer. Yousef spent many hours reading, and would sometimes even pretend to be sick so that his youngest sister would buy him a book. Perhaps one of his earliest creative endeavors was making up endings for the Saga of Saif Bin Dhi Yazn, as his copy was missing the last few pages.

As a young man, Yousef excelled in painting and photography. At age 10, he won an award for children's painting, and went on to study Arabic calligraphy. At age 15 he began to study literature at the Jazeera secondary school. It was during this time that he began to write and publish short stories.

When Al-Mohaimeed entered the Faculty of Management Sciences at King Saud University at age 18, he became more involved with politics, and began editing a weekly magazine called Hiwar, meaning dialogue. The magazine, which published politically sensitive articles, was banned, and Al-Mohaimeed was nearly expelled for his involvement. He devoted himself more fully to literature, but his first collection of short stories, Zahira La Musha Laha (An Afternoon Without Pedestrians)published in 1989, was withdrawn from the market after a well-known religious leader complained that it was immoral. However, Al-Mohaimeed has been successful in publishing his work in other countries--Rajfat Athwabihim Al Beed (The Movement of Their White Robes) was published in Cairo in 1993, and La Budda Anna Ahadan Harraka Al Kurrasa (Someone Must Have Moved the Notebook) in Beirut in 1996.

After graduation, Al-Mohaimeed worked in accounting and journalism. In 1998, he traveled to Britain to study English and photography. In 2000, Al-Mohaimeed returned to his home of Riyadh. His first novel, Laghat Mawta (The Gossip of the Dead), was published in 2000 by the Arab Writer's Union in Damascus.

Yousef Al-Mohaimeed is one of the Saudi writers emerging from the heavily censored, intellectually oppressive environment. In 2008, Wolves of the Crescent Moon, which was banned in Saudi Arabia, became his first book published outside of the Middle East.

== Awards and recognition ==
In 2004, he received an award from Divan al Arab magazine and the Egyptian Journalists Union for his creative contribution to Arab culture.

He was featured in an article by Scott Wilson of The Washington Post in 2005: "For Arab Writers, New Lines in the Sand: Young Authors Push the Limits of Social and Political Freedom"

In 2009, he received the Pushcart Prize for the short story "Soap and Ambergris", which he adapted from his forthcoming novel, Munira's Bottle. It appeared in PEN America Issue 9: Checkpoints, and was included in Pushcart Prize XXXIII – Best of the Small Presses.

He was featured in an article about contemporary Saudi literature in The National in February 2009 .

Wolves of the Crescent Moon was shortlisted for the inaugural Jan Michalski Prize for Literature in 2010. It is won An Italian Alziator Prize 2011, for Italian translation by the title: Le trappole del profumo.

Pigeons Don't Fly in Buraydah won Abu al-Qasim Ashabbi for Arabic novel prize in 2011.

== Works published in English ==
- 2007:Wolves of the Crescent Moon. AUC Press. Translated by Anthony Calderbank.
- 2007:Wolves of the Crescent Moon. Penguin USA.
- 2010:Munira's Bottle. AUC Press. Translated by Anthony Calderbank.

== Works published in Arabic ==
=== Stories ===
- 1989: Zahira La Musha Laha (An Afternoon Without Pedestrians). Riyadh.
- 1993: Rajfat Athwabihim Al Beed (The Movement of Their White Robes). Cairo: Shargiyat Publishing House.
- 1996: La Budda Anna Ahadan Harraka Al Kurrasa (Someone Must Have Moved the Notebook). Beirut: Al-Jadeed Publishing House.
- 2005: Akhi Yufattish ‘an Rimbaud (My Brother Is Looking for Rimbaud). Arabic Cultural Center. Beirut/Dar Al-Baida

=== Novels ===
- 2003: Laghat Mawta(The Dead’s Gossip). Colone, Germany: Al-Jamel Publishing House
- 2003: Fikhakh Al Ra’iha (Wolves of the Crescent Moon). Beirut: Riyadh Al-Rais Publishing House.
- 2004: Al Qarura (The Bottle). Beirut/Dar Al-Baida: Arab Cultural Center.
- 2006: Nozhat Addolphin (The Dolphin’s Excursion). Beirut: Riyadh Al-Rais Publishing House.
- 2009: Alhamam La Yatiru Fi Buraydah (Pigeons Don't Fly in Buraydah). Beirut/Dar Al-Baida: Arab Cultural Center.

=== Other ===
2004: Al Nakhil Wa Al Qirmid: Mushahadat Min Al Basra Ila Norwich (Palms & Brick: From Basra to Norwich). Travel literature. Beirut: Arab Studies & Publishing Est.

In 2008, the short story "Soap and Ambergris" was published in PEN America 9: Checkpoints.

On May 1, 2008, he attended and participated in a conversation at the PEN World Voices Festival alongside Matt Weiland, Joshua Furst, Francisco Goldman and Juan De Recacoechea, entitled "The Secret Lives of Cities. The event was transcribed and published in PEN America 10: Fear Itselfin 2009, under the title "The Secret Lives of Cities".
