= Thebes at War =

1944 book by Nagieb Mahfoez

- First English-language edition, published by American University in Cairo Press, cover shows chariot horses from Tutankhamen's decorated box
- Author: Naguib Mahfouz
- Original title: كفاح طيبة
- Translator: Humphrey T. Davies
- Language: Arabic
- Series: Three Novels of Ancient Egypt
- Genre: Historical fiction
- Publisher: Dar Shorouq
- Publication date: 1944
- Publication place: Egypt
- English publication date: 2003
- Preceded by: Rhadopis of Nubia (1943)
- Followed by: Cairo Modern (1945)

Thebes at War (Kefah Teba; Arabic: كفاح طيبة) is an early novel by the Egyptian writer Naguib Mahfouz. It was originally published in Arabic in 1944. An English translation by Humphrey Davies appeared in 2003. The novel is one of several that Mahfouz wrote at the beginning of his career, with Pharaonic Egypt as their setting. Others in this series of novels include Khufu's Wisdom (1939) and Rhadopis of Nubia (1943). All have been translated into English and appeared in one volume under the title Three Novels of Ancient Egypt (Everyman's Library, 2007).
