= Salwa Bakr =

Egyptian critic, novelist and author

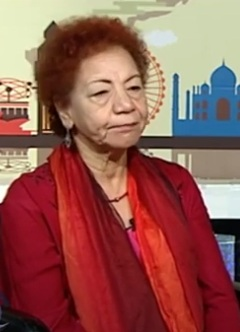
Salwa Bakr, June 2021.

Salwa Bakr (Arabic: سلوى بكر; born 1949) is an Egyptian critic, novelist and author. She is the author of seven volumes of short stories (including The Wiles of Men, AUC Press, 1997), seven novels, and a play. Her work has been translated into nine languages and holds international recognition.

== Biography ==
She was born in the Matariyya district in Cairo in 1949. Her father was a railway worker. She studied business at Ain Shams University, gaining a BA degree in 1972. She went on to earn another BA in literary criticism in 1976, before embarking on a career in journalism. She worked as a film and theatre critic for various Arabic newspapers and magazines. Bakr lived in Cyprus for a few years with her husband before returning to Egypt in the mid-1980s.

Bakr's father died early, leaving her mother a poor widow. Her work often deals with the lives of the impoverished and the marginalized. In his collection of short stories by Arab writers, the Serbian literary critic Srpko Leštarić wrote: "Part of Salwa Bakr’s popularity lies in her being a counterforce to the conservative voices which challenge her work because they feel threatened by it." In particular, many of her stories deal with the problems of women of different social levels in Egyptian society, as exemplified in the stories told by women inmates of a prison in her novel The Golden Chariot.

In 1985, she published her first collection of short stories, Zinat at the President's Funeral, which was an immediate success. She has published several collections of short stories and novels since. Her debut novel of 1993 was called Wasf al-Bulbul (The Description of the Nightingale).

== Translations ==
Several of Bakr's books and stories have been translated into various European languages, including English, German, Spanish, French or Polish. Her work has appeared in Banipal magazine, Words Without Borders, and in a number of English-language anthologies.

Single-volume English translations of her work include:

- The Man from Bashmour, American Univ in Cairo Press, 2007 - translated by Nancy Roberts
- The Golden Chariot, American Univ in Cairo Press, 2008 - translated by Dinah Manisty
- The Wiles of Men and Other Stories, University of Texas Press, 1993 - translated by Denys Johnson-Davies
- Such a Beautiful Voice, General Egyptian Book Organization, 1992 - translated by Hoda El Sadda

== Awards and reception ==
The Man from Bashmour was named as one of the 100 best Arabic novels by the Arabic Writers' Union. In 1993, she won the German Deutsche Welle Prize for Literature. Notwithstanding her relatively few novels or collections of short stories, she is highly regarded in Arab literary circles.
