= Velvet (novel) =

2016 novel by Huzama Habayeb

- Book cover
- Author: Huzama Habayeb
- Language: Arabic
- Genre: Arabic Literature
- Published: January 2016
- Publisher: Arab Institute For Research & Publishing
- Publication place: Palestine
- Pages: 361
- Award: Naguib Mahfouz Medal for Literature (2017)

Velvet (Arabic: مُخْمَل) is an Arabic language novel by Palestinian author Huzama Habayeb published in 2016. The book won the Naguib Mahfouz Medal for Literature in 2017. The novel depicts several Palestinian women experiencing tragic love stories under the compelling circumstances and within the ultraconservative community of Baqa'a refugee camp in Jordan.

The original title "مُخْمَل", which in English means "Velvet", is the all-time favorite kind of fabric to Qamar, a widowed lonely tailoress and one of the main female characters in the novel. The female protagonist of the novel, whose name is Hawwa, meets Qamar and becomes a protégé of hers. In addition to tailoring, Hawwa learns a lot about life from Qamar; and along the way, the love of velvet is passed on by the mentor to the apprentice.

Unlike most other Arabic novels with content closely or remotely related to Palestine, "Velvet" is almost bereft of any political or patriotic themes pertaining to the Palestinian issue; it rather employs the narrative to portray the utterly humane dimensions of common Palestinians — particularly the women — with little or no attention to politics. Rasheed El Enani, one of the members of the committee that awarded the Naguib Mahfouz Medal for Literature in 2017, described the novel by saying, "It is not about the political cause, the resistance, the dream of return. It is rather about ordinary Palestinians whose lives go on meanwhile, unnoticed and unrecorded, in the background, while the high dramas of politics occupy center-stage."

== Conception and writing ==
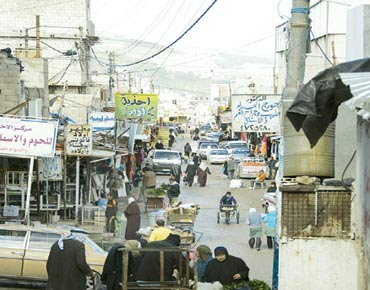
Baq'a refugee camp in Jordan — the place where the events of Huzama Habayeb's "Velvet" take place.

Although "Velvet" is entirely fictional, the setting is inspired by Huzama Habayeb's own upbringing and familiarity with the Palestinians' status quo within Jordan, as well as the fact that she is a descendant of a refugee family and has friends and acquaintances who live in Baq'a refugee camp, the place where most of the novel's events occur, as she stated in an interview with Asharq Al-Awsat newspaper. Her father, along with other paternal relatives, was also among the Palestinians who were displaced in 1948 and settled in Zarqa refugee camp in Jordan. In the acceptance speech she delivered on 11 December 2017 at the American University in Cairo (AUC) when she received the Naguib Mahfouz Medal for Literature for "Velvet", Huzama Habayeb tearfully evoked her father's displacement experience at the end of her address.

I am Huzama Habayeb, the daughter of the Palestinian refugee, Hamed Mohammed Habayeb, who left his Palestinian village when he was a 7-year-old child, holding his mother's hand, inattentive to what the country and its people were destined to, unaware that he had turned into a symbol of the age's greatest calamity…

— Huzama Habayeb, acceptance speech for the 2017 Naguib Mahfouz Medal for Literature

As for the duration Habayeb spent on writing the novel and conducting the needed research, it was around two and a half years, as she stated in an interview on Al-Ghad TV. Habayeb also said — during the same aforementioned interview — that she purchased huge amounts of fabric, perused the history of fabrics and textiles, learned sewing and tailoring, and conducted interviews with seamstresses just to provide the readers with a plausible tailoring-related content. In the last 8 months of the process, Habayeb wrote every day for 12 hours.

== Main characters ==
=== Hawwa ===
Hawwa is the protagonist of the novel. She is a forty-something dreamy woman who is in a tireless pursuit of love that seems to be unattainable. It is worth mentioning that the name "Hawwa" is the Arabic equivalent of "Eve", which obviously holds a lot of symbolism.

=== Qamar ===
Qamar is a seamstress with both a vague history and her own tragic love story. She is Hawwa's mentor, adviser, and role model.

=== Musa ===
Musa is Hawwa's father. He is an abusive construction worker who beats his wife, molests his own daughters, and casts fear in the hearts of all family members.

=== Rab'a ===
Rab'a is Hawwa's mother. She was forced to marry Musa, who constantly inflicts serious physical and emotional injuries on her. Rab'a is portrayed as a helpless wife who suffers from an emotional drought.

=== Nayfeh ===
Nayfeh is Hawwa's paternal grandmother. From the outside, she is depicted as a tough, angry, discontented woman; yet from the inside, she is crushed. Nayfeh is the one who orchestrates the arranged marriage between Hawwa and Nathmi.

=== Nathmi ===
Nathmi is Hawwa's undesired husband. He is a younger, but equally cruel, version of her abusive father.

=== Lutfi ===
Lutfi is Hawwa's elder brother. He keeps himself isolated from his family's issues and lives in a world of his own, indifferent to the tribulations surrounding him.

=== Ayed ===
Ayed is Hawwa's younger brother. He also gets his own share of beating from his ruthless dad, Musa, especially in the mornings when Ayed's bed is found wet due to his nocturnal enuresis.

=== Qays ===
Qays is Hawwa's son, who grows up to possess a similar character of his father (Nathmi).

=== Ayah ===
Ayah is Hawwa's daughter. She and her mother have some things common: Both have been physically and emotionally abused by their fathers, and both have demonstrated a lack of emotions toward their mothers.

=== Muneer ===
Muneer is Hawwa's lover who becomes the soon-to-be second husband after she divorces Nathmi.

== Reception ==
=== Media and critics ===
Through "Hawwa" — and a big number of characters shaped with highly artistic techniques — Huzama encapsulates the life in the Palestinian camp in an extremely rich manner, captures the details, narrates the emotions and sentiments, and writes in a language of utter sensitivity, exposing everything that happens within the "dimness" of the houses in a way that is almost frightening.

— Al-Ghad newspaper, in a review, 5 January 2016

Shortly after it was published, the novel was critically acclaimed in a review posted by Al-Jazeera's website. The review acknowledges Huzama Habayeb as "one of the most prominent novelists in the Arabic narrative scene." Al-Hayat newspaper commended Habayeb's writing style and deemed "Velvet" an "added value to the Palestinian novels, in particular, as well as the Arabic novels in general."

=== Naguib Mahfouz Medal for Literature ===
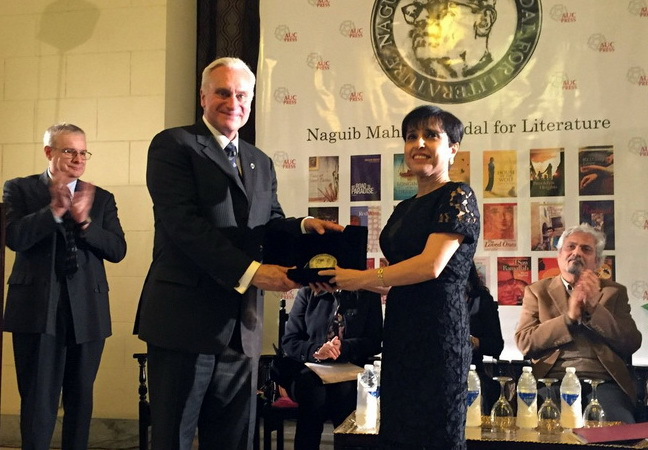
Huzama Habayeb receives the 2017 Naguib Mahfouz Medal for Literature at the AUC from Francis J. Ricciardone Jr.

On 11 December 2017, Huzama Habayeb's "Velvet" won Naguib Mahfouz Medal for Literature. The award — which was handed to Habayeb by Francis J. Ricciardone Jr., the president of the American University in Cairo (AUC) — includes a silver medal, cash prize, and a publication of an English translation of the novel.

The award committee hailed "Velvet" as a "new kind of Palestinian novel" that concentrates on the marginalized common Palestinians in diaspora and avoids the pretentious display of spurious patriotic themes revolving around the political struggle. The novel was also commended for its "poetic prose and skillful deployment of vocabulary choice." Shereen Abouelnaga, a professor of English literature at the AUC and a member in the award committee, said "The author of 'Velvet' has managed to create a parallel world for the reader to perceive the harsh and arid life in the camp."

Velvet is distinguished by the richness of its language and its empathy with its subject. Together, these produce a finely-textured description of a life lived in hardship but overflowing with sensibility and grace...

— The judges of Naguib Mahfouz Medal for Literature, 11 December 2017

Authors and publishers are the ones who usually submit nominations to the AUC to be considered for Naguib Mahfouz Medal for Literature. However, the award committee itself may select a novel even if it was not nominated by any authors, publishers, or anyone; and that was the case in 2017 — neither Huzama Habayeb nor her publisher nominated "Velvet" for the medal; the members of the award committee were the ones who selected the novel directly, which was a "big surprise" to Habayeb, as she said in an interview with MBC.net website — a surprise that "reiterated a principle" in which she had always believed: "Innovative writing that is characterized by genuineness and makes a difference is capable eventually to impose itself and have its say."

== Adaptations ==
There have been no official announcements yet that the novel will be made into a movie, but numerous critics have reiterated the possibility of adapting the book as a film due to the cinematic style that dominates the narrative; and when asked whether she perceived the novel would turn into a movie, Habayeb replied: "Why not? As a matter of fact, when I write, I see. I don't think of the words, sentences, characters, or the way I should phrase the words; I rather see the words, sentences, and the characters being created in front of me visually."
