= Khalil Sweileh =

Syrian journalist and novelist (born 1959)

Khalil Sweileh (Arabic: خليل صويلح; born 1959) is a Syrian journalist and novelist. He was born Al-Hasakah city in northern Syria and studied literature at Damascus University. He has since worked for a number of cultural publications in various capacities.

Sweileh received the Naguib Mahfouz Medal in 2009 for his novel Writing Love, translated by Alexa Firat and published in English in 2012. In his acceptance speech, Sweileh mentioned that as a village boy, his chance discovery of a tattered copy of Mahfouz's novel Khufu's Wisdom was partly responsible for inspiring his love of literature.

His previous novels include Express Mail (2004), Do Not Blame Me (2006), and Zuhur, Sara, and Nariman (2008). In 2010, he won the Arab Journalism Award and the Sheikh Zayed Book Award for literature in 2018 for his novel Ikhtibar al-Nadam (Remorse Test). He published The Bride's Water in 2025.
