= House of the Wolf =

2010 book by Ezzat el Kamhawi

- Author: Ezzat el Kamhawi
- Original title: بيت الديب
- Translator: Nancy Roberts
- Language: English
- Genre: Novel
- Published: First Edition: AUC Press 2013, Cairo
- Publication place: Egypt
- Media type: Print
- Pages: 272
- Awards: Naguib Mahfouz Medal for Literature
- ISBN: 978-977-416-620-4

House of the Wolf (Bayt al-Deeb, Arabic: بيت الدِّيب) is Ezzat el Kamhawi's fourth novel and eighth book. It was first released in Arabic language in 2010 by Dar Al-Adab in Beirut.

In December 2012, el Kamhawi was awarded the Naguib Mahfouz Medal for Literature award for this novel, the English edition was released in 2013 by AUC Press. The translation was done by Nancy Roberts.

== Background ==
In House of the Wolf el-Kamhawi deals with the lives of four generations of the Wolf (Al-Deeb) rural Egyptian family for more than one hundred and fifty years, monitoring the Egyptian and World history through the history of the family.

A novel of 272 pages of medium size, and thus is considered the biggest work for Ezzat el Kamhawi, a writer known for his intensive language. In the novel, history remains a reference in the background, while man stands unwavering in the face of history and his personal fate.
