= Brooklyn Heights (book) =

Book by Miral al-Tahawy

First edition

Brooklyn Heights is the fourth novel by Egyptian writer Miral al-Tahawy. It was shortlisted for the Arabic Booker Prize for 2011 and won the 2010 Naguib Mahfouz Medal for Literature The novel, released in Arabic in 2010, was published in an English translation by Sameh Salim from the American University in Cairo Press the following year. Al-Tahawy holds a doctorate in Arabic literature from Cairo University and teaches at Arizona State University in Phoenix, Arizona.

Miral Al-Tahawy, a member of the Al-Hanadi tribe, grew up in a conservative Bedouin village in the eastern Nile Delta. Although "Brooklyn Heights" takes place in the present day, soon after President Obama's election in 2008, her family life and the influence of Bedouin tribal customs, are told in flashbacks. The highly autobiographical novel relates the emigrant experience in New York City of an Egyptian Bedouin woman and her son.

== Plot summary ==
Hend and her 8-year-old son move to Flatbush Avenue in Brooklyn Heights, Brooklyn. in an attempt to escape her failed marriage and the restrictiveness of her family. The story juxtaposes Hend and her son and their attitudes towards the United States. While everything around Hend reminds her of her homeland, her son feels at ease with American culture. Her fortune at a Chinese restaurant triggers a flashback to her life in the Nile Delta.

Hend's father was a lawyer who chose to stroll around town in elegant clothing instead of practicing law. In the evenings he often held meetings in the reception house with his friends.

Hend's parents fought over money daily, and it put an extreme strain on their marriage. Similar to her parents, Hend was also involved in a disconsolate marriage that ended with her husband leaving her.

A few months after Hend's husband left her, he returned to the house where he found her and her son playing basketball outside and asked to join them. Hend's son ends up scoring 57 points and 37 rebounds which incited Hend to take her son to Brooklyn for professional team tryouts.

Hend relocated to Brooklyn with the visa she inherited from her husband. She dreams of being a writer but instead finds a job at Dunkin' Donuts in the oldest neighborhood of Arab-American immigrants, the "Brooklyn Gulf". She takes English lessons at night, hoping to find a respectable job, such as a painter, a writer, or an actress.

Hend takes tango lessons from an American man in her apartment building and dates him a couple of times, but he quickly moves on to one of her friends, who spends nights with him. Her friendships with women are equally brief.

She reads poetry to Ziyad, a Palestinian baker who dreams of making movies like Pulp Fiction. Finally, both their dreams come true. He shoots a short film about an Arab immigrant family, with Hend playing the mother.
