= Sharaf (novel) =

1997 novel by Sonallah Ibrahim

- Author: Sonallah Ibrahim
- Language: Modern Standard Arabic
- Genre: Novel
- Publisher: Dar Al-Hilal
- Publication date: 1997
- Publication place: Egypt
- ISBN: 9770705152
- OCLC: 4770214805
- Website: https://www.goodreads.com/book/show/5948599

Sharaf is a novel belonging to prison literature, written by Sonallah Ibrahim, published in 1997, and ranked as the third best novel in the list of the top 100 Arab novels.

== Summary ==
The novel is divided into four parts:

- In the first part, Ashraf or Sharaf, as his mother calls him, enters prison after killing Al-Khawaja (foreign tourist) who tried to violate his honor and inside the prison, Sharaf learns about a new world and new laws.
- The second part is the story of Dr.Ramzi, who is imprisoned in a bribery case. This part is more documentary than literary, in which Ramzi reveals the crimes of multinational companies, especially pharmaceutical companies, against the Third World and its peoples.
- The third part is a play written by Ramzi to be shown inside the prison in the celebration of the sixth of October. In this play, Sonallah Ibrahim presents the various transformations that Egypt has undergone from Nasser through Sadat to Mubarak.
- In the fourth and final part, the author reveals the human face of prisoners, especially those with long sentences. The novel ends with no definite end, a very open ending.

== Plot ==
The novel told the story of Ashraf Abdel Aziz Suleiman, or “Sharaf”. Who is a young man in his early twenties, born in 1974 for a middle-class family. His life has been distorted by factors of economic openness. The novel begins with Sharaf wandering in an expensive market. On this day, he goes to an expensive cinema, where he meets a foreign tourist from England named “John”. Then John takes him to his house where he tries to assault him. In defense of his honor, he kills John, causing Sharaf to be imprisoned. Then most of the story takes place in prison, where he discovers a world of corruption, bribery, and types of human rights violations. Sharaf's world in prison represents a mirror reflecting the world outside the prison, which is divided between owner and non-owner classes, where everyone is forced to pay bribes for everything they want to eat or for all their movements in prison. The novel expresses how the economic situation plays the most important role in obtaining justice and rights. This is an evident in the character of Sharaf himself, as he cannot obtain justice even though he is oppressed, because he cannot afford the costs a skilled lawyers. Although he is a criminal for self-defense only, he admits that he killed a tourist during a looting campaign after he was subjected to severe torture and threats at the hands of the police that they would assault his sister if he did not confess. Whereas a murderer was able to win acquittal because he was able to obtain the services of a skilled lawyer. The prisoners in this cell are divided into two classes, those from the wealthy class in the royal ward (regal ward) and the poor class in the military ward. “The royal means to eat and dress as you like, and the Meri wears a prison uniform and eats bread and cheese and is used every day by the prisoners of the royal department”. The novel narrates the experiences of Sharaf in the cell, if he turns from the military ward to the royal ward, where he meets another main character of the novel, Dr. Ramzi Boutros Nassif, who was accused by his colleagues because he tried to exposes the injustice, persecution, corruption and exploitation practiced by multinational corporations from paying bribes and testing medicines on dissatisfied citizens. In the cell Dr. Ramzy tries to educate the prisoners and create their awareness of this and other such matters. Then Dr. “Ramzy” presents a play in the cell at the celebration of the brides of the 1973 war, aimed at letting the prisoners know that Egypt has reached this state of economic stagnation as a result of Egypt's alliance with Israel and the West, which led to an escalation of oppression, injustice and corruption. But the show deteriorates into turmoil. The doctor is deposited in solitary confinement. There he collects clippings from newspapers and magazines in order to put his anxiety and concern through facts and documents. But his attempts to incite his colleagues to the revolution are in vain. The work concludes and Dr. Ramzy shouts in his imprisonment that he has gone insane. While the main character Sharaf shaves his body in preparation for gay sex. This is how the honor of Sharaf is subjected to assault, The same thing that went to prison because of his defense.

== See also ==
- The Stealth (novel)
