= Yahya Taher Abdullah =

Egyptian writer (1942–1981)

Yahya Taher Abdullah (Arabic: يحيى الطاهر عبدالله ; 1942–1981) was an Egyptian writer.

== Biography ==
Abdullah born in Karnak in 1942. He grew up in Upper Egypt, but moved to Cairo in 1964. One of the first to recognize his talents was the writer and editor Edwar al-Kharrat who arranged a monthly stipend for him. Nonetheless, Abdullah lived a meagre existence. He gained renown in literary circles for live readings of his stories, and published several novellas and short story collections. He had no formal literary training, but was widely regarded as one of the top young Egyptian writers of the 1960s. Abdullah was one of the contributors of the avant-garde literary magazine Galerie 68 which was launched in 1968. He died in a car crash in the Western Desert on 9 April 1981.

In his memoirs, the translator Denys Johnson-Davies describes his acquaintanceship with Abdullah and his struggle to publish the author's short stories in English. That first collection, eventually published as part of the Heinemann Arab Authors series, was called The Mountain Of Green Tea and is still available from the AUC Press. More recently, The Collar and the Bracelet was translated by Samah Selim and published by the AUC Press in 2009. Selim won the Banipal Prize for her translation. The Collar and the Bracelet was also adapted for the screen by the famous realist film director Khairy Bishara in 1986.
