= Raymond Stock =

American academic, writer and translator

Raymond T. Stock is an American academic, writer and translator. He has a BA in Mass Media/Foreign Affairs from Grand Valley State University (1980), and an MA in Middle Eastern Studies from the University of Michigan in Ann Arbor (1983). He completed his PhD in Near Eastern Languages and Civilizations from the University of Pennsylvania in 2008. He was a Guggenheim Fellow for the academic year 2007-2008.

Stock moved to Cairo in 1990 where he lived principally for the next 20 years. He has translated a number of books by the Nobel Prize-winning Egyptian author Naguib Mahfouz, including Khufu's Wisdom. He is currently writing the first full-length biography of Mahfouz to appear in any language, under contract from Farrar, Straus and Giroux.

Stock served as Visiting Assistant Professor of Arabic and Middle East Studies at Drew University in 2010-11. He has written widely on Egypt and the Middle East, and his articles and translations have appeared in numerous publications including the Financial Times, Foreign Policy magazine, Harper's Magazine, International Herald Tribune, and London Magazine. As of August 2015, Stock serves as an instructor of Arabic at Louisiana State University.

== See also ==
- List of Arabic-to-English translators
