= The Stealth (novel) =

Novel by Egyptian writer Sonallah ibrahim

- Author: Sonallah Ibrahim
- Language: Arabic
- Genre: Novel
- Published: 2007
- Publisher: Dar Al-Mostakbal Alaraby
- Publication place: Egypt
- ISBN: 9789772392094
- OCLC: 587891400

The Stealth is the ninth novel by Sonallah Ibrahim. The novel was published in 2007 in Cairo, Arab Future House. The writer covers issues that filled his mind and formed his concerns.

== Plot ==
The novel is set in Egypt in 1948 and is narrated from the perspective of a young boy living with his father. Through the child's observations, Ibrahim presents a detailed portrayal of everyday life and the social environment of the period. The narrator observes the people and activities around him, recording details of domestic life, personal interactions, school routines, and the customs associated with streets, markets, public squares, and mosques. The child's perspective serves as a narrative device through which the novel depicts the social and cultural atmosphere of Egypt during the late 1940s.

The habit of voyeurism is the habit of the child, and it is something that the father does not realize in the novel due to the young age of his “voyeur” son, especially when the father takes the son with him wherever he goes. The child witnesses all the father's conversations with some people about politics, art, literature, women and the social situation in Egypt during wartime.

This novel focuses on many important topics, and perhaps the most important of them is the political topics, as the political topic in this novel clarifies the course of that time, in terms of the monarchy in that period and their immersion in the pleasures of life while the people were starving and Palestine has been lost since that period, in the times of domination British and French customs and traditions in Arab countries.

Through The Voyeur, Sonallah Ibrahim explores themes of social and political hypocrisy, deception, and corruption as perceived through the perspective of an innocent child.

== See also ==
- Sharaf (novel)
