= Somaya Ramadan =

Egyptian writer (1951–2024)

Somaya Yehia Ramadan
- سمية رمضان
- Born: 1951; Cairo, Egypt
- Died: 19 August 2024 (aged 73)
- Education: Cairo University, Trinity College, Dublin
- Notable work: Leaves of Narcissus
- Awards: Naguib Mahfouz Medal for Literature

Somaya Yehia Ramadan (Arabic: سمية رمضان, romanized: Sumayyah Ramaḍān; 1951 - 20 August 2024) was an Egyptian academic, translator and writer. She is mainly known for her 2001 novel Awraq Al-Nargis, published in English as Leaves of Narcissus that won the Naguib Mahfouz Medal for Literature and for her Arabic translation of Virginia Woolf's A Room of One's Own.

== Biography ==
Ramadan was born in Cairo in 1951 and studied English literature at Cairo University. Subsequently, she obtained a PhD in English from Trinity College, Dublin, in 1983.

Ramadan's first two books were short story collections: Khashab wa Nahass (Wood and Brass) and Manazil al-Qamar (Phases of the Moon). Her first novel Awraq Al-Nargis (Leaves of Narcissus) published in 2001, set largely in Ireland and centred around the notion of exile, won the Naguib Mahfouz Medal for Literature. It was translated into English by Marilyn Booth and published in 2006 by AUC Press. The same year, a French translation was published as Feuilles de Narcisse. Commenting on her literary technique and narrative style, the jury for this prestigious Egyptian literary prize wrote:

The novel is supremely complex, with modernist techniques pushed to the utmost, and thus maintaining all along a superb and vibrant creative tension. … Marked by a hallucinating and captivating narration, this is liminal writing par excellence: writing while gazing at the abyss of being.

Ramadan also worked extensively as a translator. Among her translations is Virginia Woolf's A Room of One's Own. Further, she was a founding member of the Women and Memory Forum, a non-profit organisation, and taught English and Translation at the National Academy of Arts in Cairo.

Ramadan was an Egyptian Baha'i and author of a non-fiction book, where she tried to clarify common misunderstandings about this faith. She died on 19 August 2024, at the age of 73.

== Works ==
Ramadan's works include:

- Khashab wa-nuḥās (Wood and Brass), short stories,1995
- Manāzil al-Qamar (Phases of the Moon), short stories, 1999
- Awraq al-Nargis, novel, 2001 Leaves of Narcissus, translated by Marilyn Booth, Cairo: AUC Press, ISBN 9789774160585.
- Ṭarīq al-mustaqbal: ruʼyah Bahāʼīyah' (Path of the Future: Baha'i Faith), non-fiction work

== Literature ==
- Muhammad Birairi (2002). "فعل الكتابة وسؤال الوجود: قراءة في أوراق سمية رمضان النرجسية / Writing and Being: A Reading of Somaya Ramadan's Leaves of Narcissus". Alif: Journal of Comparative Poetics (22). Cairo: The American University in Cairo: 94–113. doi:10.2307/1350064. JSTOR 1350064.
