= Fatma Qandil =

Egyptian writer (born 1958)

- Born: 1958 (age 67–68); Egypt
- Occupations: Author, poet, translator, academic
- Writing career
- Language: Arabic
- Notable work: Empty Cages (Aqfas farigha)
- Notable awards: Naguib Mahfouz Medal for Literature (2022)

Fatma Qandil (born 1958) is an Egyptian author, poet, playwright, translator, and academic. She is best known for her debut novel, Empty Cages (Aqfas farigha), which won the Naguib Mahfouz Medal for Literature in 2022.

== Early life ==
Qandil was born in 1958 in Egypt.

== Academic and literary career ==
Alongside her literary career, Qandil works as an Associate Professor (Emerita) in the Department of Arabic Language at Helwan University in Cairo. She has also worked as the deputy editor-in-chief of Fusul, a magazine focused on literary criticism.

Before venturing into long-form fiction, Qandil established herself in Egyptian literature through her poetry, plays, and translations, having published numerous collections of poetry and works of literary criticism in Arabic.

Her English-language debut and first novel, Empty Cages (Arabic: أقفاص فارغة), was originally published in 2021. The novel is a work of auto-fiction that blurs the lines between memoir and fiction, recounting the life of an Egyptian woman growing up in a middle-class family as the society around it deteriorates in the post-colonial era. The narrative candidly tackles themes of patriarchy, trauma, displacement, poverty, and family dynamics.

In December 2022, Empty Cages was awarded the 25th Naguib Mahfouz Medal for Literature. The judging panel praised the novel for its "unflinchingly honest portrayal of the relationships of violence that lie beneath the surface of an ordinary middle-class Egyptian family." As part of the award, the novel was translated into English by Adam Talib and was published in 2025.

== Reception ==
Upon publication, Empty Cages received critical praise. Foreword Reviews observed that the novel "moves with quiet intent, tracing a life through memory's fragments," and noted how the titular cages represent both release and confinement for its subjects. In The Markaz Review, Ahmed Naji wrote that the novel displays "exceptional craftsmanship and [a] brutally honest exploration of taboo subjects." The review also highlighted how the work acts as a personal memoir that simultaneously mirrors the political and social trajectory of Egypt from the 1960s to the present day.

== Selected works ==
=== Poetry and plays ===
- ‘Ashan niqdar naʿish (So We Can Live), 1984
- Hazr al-tajawwul (Curfew), 1987
- Al-layla al-thaniya baʿd al-alf (The Second Night After the Thousand), 1990
- Samt qutna mubtalla (The Silence of Wet Cotton), 1995
- Asʾila muʿallaqa kal-dhabaʾih (Questions Hung Like Sacrifices), 2008
- Ana shahid qabrik (I Am Your Tombstone), 2009
- Bayti lahu baban (My House Has Two Doors), 2017

=== Fiction ===
- Aqfas farigha (Empty Cages), 2021. (English translation by Adam Talib, AUC Press, 2025).

=== Academic and literary studies ===
- Al-tanass fi shiʿr al-sabʿinat (Intertextuality in the Poetry of the Seventies), 1999

== Awards and honors ==
- 2022: Naguib Mahfouz Medal for Literature for Empty Cages
