= The Longing of the Dervish =

2014 novel by Hammour Ziada

- Cover of the English translated edition
- Author: Hammour Ziada
- Original title: شوق الدرويش
- Translator: Jonathan Wright
- Language: Arabic
- Subject: History; Mahdist State; Political criticism; Clash of civilizations
- Genre: Novel
- Set in: 19th-century Mahdist state
- Publisher: Al Ain Publishing House
- Publication date: 2014
- Publication place: Sudan
- Media type: Print (paperback)
- Pages: 460
- ISBN: 978-9774-90-284-0

The Longing of the Dervish (Arabic: شوق الدرويش, romanized: Shawq al-Darwish) is the second novel by Sudanese writer Hammour Ziada. It was first published in 2014 by Al Ain Publishing House in Cairo. The novel won the Naguib Mahfouz Medal for Literature in 2014 and was shortlisted for the 2015 International Prize for Arabic Fiction, also known as the Arabic Booker Prize.

== Overview ==
The novel explores social conflict in Sudan during the decline of the theocratic Mahdist State. It highlights tensions between Christian culture and Islamic Sufi traditions, alongside themes of love, religion, betrayal, and political struggle. The story follows "Bakhit Mandil", a former slave and prisoner who is released and seeks revenge on those responsible for his suffering. The narrative is set during the historical period marking the entry of Anglo-Egyptian forces into Sudan in the late 19th century, leading to the defeat of the Mahdist State.
