= Sonallah Ibrahim =

Egyptian novelist and short story writer (1937–2025)

- صنع الله إبراهيم
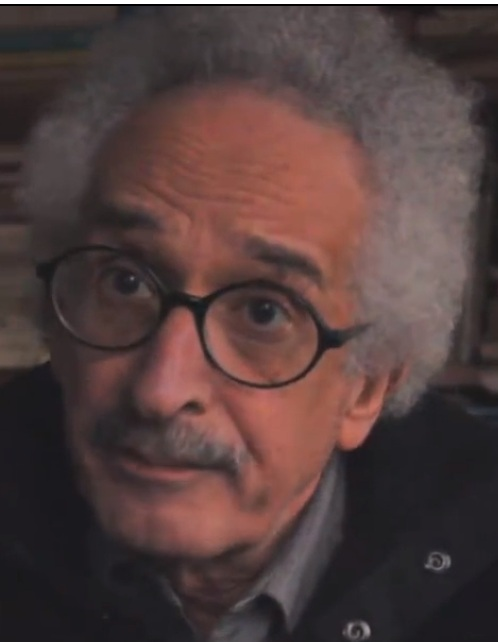
- Sonallah Ibrahim, 2016
- Born: 3 August 1937; Cairo, Egypt
- Died: 13 August 2025 (aged 88); Cairo, Egypt
- Occupation: writer

Son'allah Ibrahim (Arabic: صنع الله إبراهيم, romanized: Ṣunʻ Allāh Ibrāhīm; 3 August 1937 – 13 August 2025) was an Egyptian novelist and short story writer and one of the "Sixties Generation" who was known for his leftist views which are expressed rather directly in his work. His novels, especially later ones, incorporate many excerpts from newspapers, magazines and other political sources as a way to enlighten the people about a certain political or social issue. Because of his political opinions he was imprisoned during the 1960s; his imprisonment is featured in his first book, That Smell (تلك الرائحة), which was one of the first works of Egyptian literature to feature a modernist view.

In harmony with his political beliefs, in 2003 he refused to accept a prestigious literary award worth £E100,000 from Egypt's Ministry of Culture.

== Life and career ==
Sonallah Ibrahim was born in Cairo on 3 August 1937. His father was an upper-middle-class civil servant; his mother, from a poor background, had been a nurse hired to look after his father's paralysed first wife. Ibrahim entered Cairo University to study law in 1952. There he joined the Marxist Democratic Movement for National Liberation (DMNL). Despite the DMNL's support for Nasser's coup, Nasser moved to repress Communists in the late 1950s. Ibrahim, arrested in 1959, received a seven-year prison sentence from a military tribunal. He was released in 1964 on the occasion of Nikita Khrushchev visiting Egypt for the opening of the Aswan Dam. In 1968 Ibrahim was one of the Egyptian intellectuals who contributed to the avant-garde literary magazine Galerie 68.

Ibrahim died on 13 August 2025, at the age of 88, after suffering from pneumonia.

== Writings ==
Hosam Aboul-Ela of the University of Houston described Ibrahim as "a relentless internal critic of successive Egyptian regimes" and wrote that "Ibrahim might best be described as a sort of Egyptian cross between Jonathan Swift and Manuel Puig".

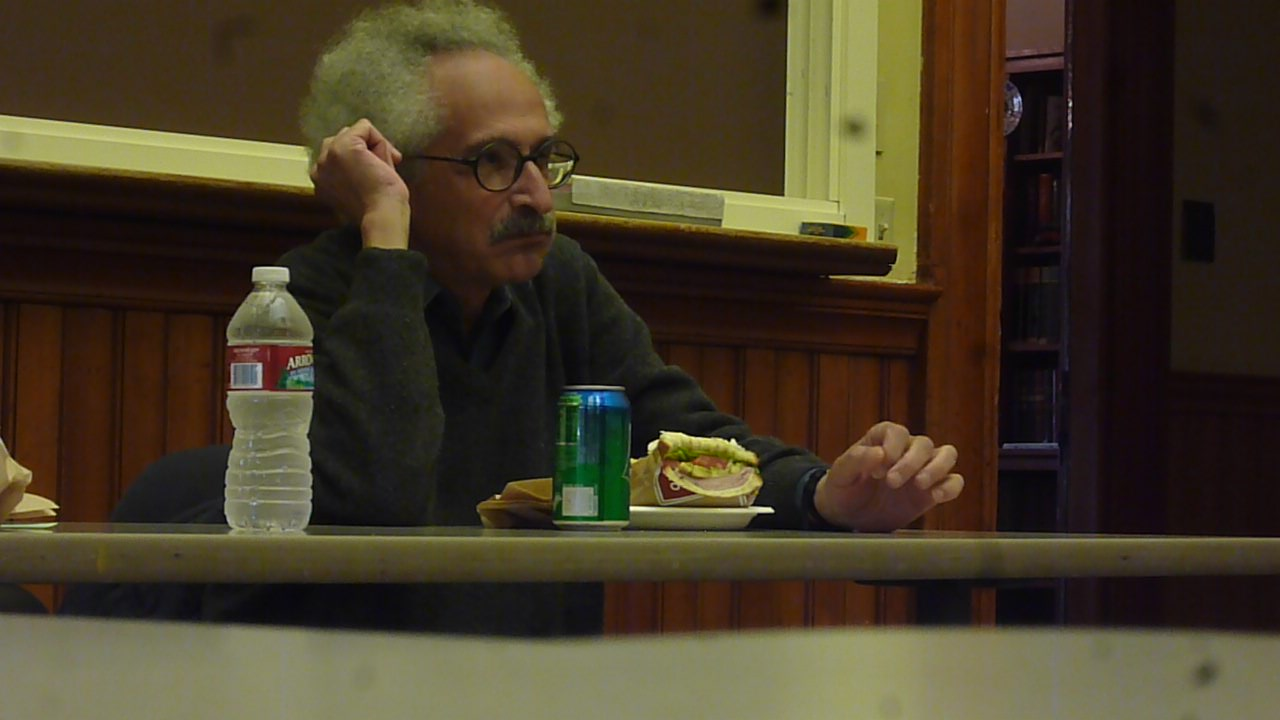
Ibrahim at Stanford

His novels are typically told in the first person, in a cold objective tone resembling press reportage which mimics reality. His main theme seems to be the importance of resisting the influence of the political mega-powers which attempt to invade the third world economically through many ways including the transcontinental companies. As an example, "Sharaf" [=Honour] deals with the intrusion of American politics in Egypt and includes long passages frankly criticising the big drug companies and their policies in third world countries. His interests are not limited to the situation in Egypt; "Beirut..Beirut" is something like an overview of the Lebanese civil war of the '70s and '80s, and "Warda" reveals a little-known episode about the activities of leftists and communists in Yemen and Oman in the '60s and '70s. The title of one of his last novels is "Amricanly" which superficially means " American" or "in an American way" but is really a parody of another word "Othmanly" related to the notorious Dark Ages when Turkey ruled Egypt. The word "Amricanly" in another way is almost a transliteration of the phrase "My affairs were mine" in Arabic. His novel, "The Committee" is often described by critics as kafkaesque. In it the protagonist seeks entry into a shadowy organization. He is routinely subject to their vetting process and Sonallah used his character to make numerous political observations in the form of speeches to the committee.

Several of Ibrahim's works also explore how repetition and fastidious attention to detail can be used to examine the themes of childhood innocence, boredom, and sexual frustration. In Stealth, the narrator recounts his childhood memories living with his father in a small, modest apartment. By describing each part of a mundane action, such as hanging up a coat or cooking some eggs, the narrator conveys his childhood curiosity and naivete about the adult world around him. In Ice, extensive repetition of intimate acts, with the same atomistic attention to detail, indicates the narrator's boredom and frustration with life as a foreign student in Soviet Russia.

== Bibliography ==
- تلك الرائحة [Tilka al-rāʾiḥah] (1966). Included in The Smell of It & Other Stories, trans. Denys Johnson-Davies (1971); also retranslated in That Smell & Notes from Prison, trans. Robyn Creswell (New Directions, 2013).
  - This roman à clef novella, set during the rule of Gamal Abdel Nasser, is about a young Egyptian writer who had been a political prisoner; he is released and takes a look at the street life in his country.
- إنسان السد العالي
- نجمة أغسطس [Najmat Aghustus] (1974). Star of August, trans. Anne Willborn (Seagull Books, forthcoming)
- اللجنة [al-Lajnah] (1981). The Committee, trans. Charlene Constable and Mary St. Germain (Syracuse University Press, 2001)
- بيروت بيروت [Bayrut, Bayrut] (1984). Beirut, Beirut, trans. Chip Rossetti (Bloomsbury Qatar, 2014)
- ذات [Dhat] (1992). Zaat, trans. Anthony Calderbank (American University in Cairo Press, 2001)
- شرف [Sharaf] (1997). Honor
- Cairo: From Edge to Edge (1999). A portrait of Cairo with photographer Jean-Pierre Ribière.
- وردة [Warda] (2000). Warda, trans. Hosam Aboul-Ela (Yale University Press, 2021)
- أمريكانلى [Amrikanli] (2003). Amricanly
- يوميات الواحات [Yawmiyyat al-Wahat] (2005). Diaries of Oasis Prison
- التلصص [al-Talassus] (2007). Stealth, trans. Hosam Aboul-Ela (Aflame Books, 2009; New Directions, 2011)
- Two Novels and Two Women/Zwei Romane und zwei Frauen, trans. Barbera Hess (Hatje Cantz Verlag, 2011)
- العمامة والقبعة [al-ʿImama wa- al-Qubbaʿa] (2008). The Turban and the Hat, trans. Bruce Fudge (Seagull Books, 2022)
- القانون الفرنسي [al-Qanun al-Faransi] (2008). The French Law
- الجليد [al-Jalid] (2011). Ice, trans. Margaret Litvin (Seagull Books, 2019)
- برلين 69 [Barlīn 69] (2014). Berlin 69
- النيل مآسي [Al nil Maassy] (2016). The Tragedies of the Nile
- 67 (2017)
- 1970 (2020). 1970: The Last Days, trans. Eleanor Ellis (Seagull Books, 2024).

As a translator

- العدو (The Enemy) by James William Drought

== Awards ==
- 1992–1993 Al Owais Award for Stories, Novels & Drama.
- The Ibn Rushd Prize for Freedom of Thought for the year 2004 in Berlin.

== See also ==
- Sharaf (novel)
- The Stealth (novel)
