= Samah Selim =

Egyptian scholar and translator

Samah Selim is an Egyptian scholar and translator of Arabic literature. She studied English literature at Barnard College, and obtained her PhD from Columbia University in 1997. At present she is an associate professor at the Department of African, Middle Eastern, and South Asian Languages and Literatures at Rutgers, the State University of New Jersey. She has also taught at Columbia, Princeton and Aix-en-Provence universities.

Selim is the author of The Novel and the Rural Imaginary in Egypt, 1880-1985 (2004). She won the 2009 Banipal Prize for her translation of Yahya Taher Abdullah's The Collar and the Bracelet. She has also translated Neighborhood and Boulevard: Reading through the Modern Arab City by the Lebanese writer Khaled Ziadeh, and Memories of a Meltdown: An Egyptian Between Moscow and Chernobyl by Mohamed Makhzangi. Future releases include a translation of Miral al-Tahawy's Brooklyn Heights (end of 2011).

In 2011, Selim won the Arkansas Arabic Translation Award for her translation of Jurji Zaydan's novel Shajarat al-Durr, based on the life of the Mamluk sultana. She thus became the first person to win both the Banipal Prize and the Arkansas Prize for Arabic literary translation.

== Bibliography ==
=== Author ===
- The Novel and the Rural Imaginary in Egypt, 1880-1985

=== Translator ===
- Yahya Taher Abdullah, The Collar and the Bracelet (2009 Banipal Prize winner)
- Khaled Ziadeh, Neighborhood and Boulevard: Reading through the Modern Arab City
- Mohamed Makhzangi, Memories of a Meltdown: An Egyptian Between Moscow and Chernobyl
- Jurji Zaydan, Shajarat al-Durr (2011 Arkansas Award winner)
- Miral al-Tahawy, Brooklyn Heights
- Arwa Salih, The Stillborn: Notebooks of a Woman from the Student-Movement Generation in Egypt

== See also ==
- List of Arabic-English translators
