= Yusuf Abu Rayya =

Egyptian author

Yusuf Abu Rayya (Arabic: يوسف أبو رية, romanized: Yūsuf Abū Rayyah; 1955 – 12 January 2009) was an Egyptian author.

== Early life ==
He was born in 1955 in Hihya in the Sharqiya Governorate, and studied journalism at Cairo University. His first published book was a collection of short stories in 1985, followed by his first novel in 1989. He wrote over a dozen books including novels, children's books and short story collections. His best known work is Wedding Night, published in 2002. This novel won the Naguib Mahfouz Medal, and an English translation by R Neil Hewison was published by the AUC Press in 2006.

== Career ==
Abu Rayya served on the governing board of the Egyptian branch of PEN International. He lent vocal support to the Syrian writer Haidar Haidar, who was the subject of a fatwa by clerics at Al-Azhar University in 2000. Abu Rayya died of liver cancer in January 2009.
