= Arwa Saleh =

Egyptian communist and feminist

- أروى صالح
- Born: 1951; Egypt
- Died: 1997 (aged 45–46)
- Occupations: Writer, Activist, Translator
- Known for: Radical student activism, Marxist feminism, underground publishing
- Notable work: al-Mubtasarun, Saratan al-Rawh
- Political party: Egyptian Communist Workers Party
- Movement: Communism, Marxist feminism

Arwa Saleh (1951–1997) was an Egyptian communist and feminist, who was a veteran student leader in the 1970s radical student movement. She was also a member of the central committee of the Marxist-Leninist Egyptian Communist Workers Party (ECWP). Much of her writing appeared in the ECWP paper, circulated underground due to state repression of communists. She also published several translations of Marxist literature in Arabic, including Tony Cliff's Class Struggle and Women's Liberation (1984). She has two published essay collections—al-Mubtasarun (or The Premature Ones/The Stillborn) and another, posthumously published, titled Saratan al-Rawh (Cancer of the Soul). She committed suicide in 1997.

== Early life and education ==
Arwa Saleh was born in 1951 in Cairo, and studied English literature at Cairo University. Upon graduating, she worked as a school teacher for a short time, and then as a translator for the state-owned Middle East News Agency and the Saudi-funded economic newspaper al-'Alam al-Yawm (The World Today). She wrote socio-political essays under pseudonyms, and her translations of Marxist literature appeared in internal and secret pamphlets and newsletters of the Egyptian Communist Workers Party (Hizb al-'Ummal al-Shuyu'i al-Misri), which functioned as an underground organization.

== Involvement in radical politics ==
Saleh was a prominent figure in the radical student movement of the early 1970s, which arose in response to the defeat of Egypt in the Arab-Israeli War of 1967 and opposition to al-Sadat's regime. An earlier wave of radical student politics in Egypt broke out in 1968, demanding harsher punishment for those responsible for the defeat in the Arab-Israeli war. Many leaders of this wave were co-opted by the regime or successfully intimidated and arrested. This wave of student activism facilitated the mobilization and recruitment of more students in political life. In late 1971 and early 1972, a new wave of demonstrations and strikes led by students erupted, with popular support. Anwar al-Sadat's cuts to public spending and suppression of freedom of speech provoked anger and fear, and the stalemate with Israel meant that many students spent a prolonged period in mandatory military service with no hope of entering the job market. Student movements, as a result, became more organized and militant—they circulated leaflets, pamphlets and organized meetings criticizing the regime. Students occupied campuses for weeks, employing the machines and print supplies of the official Cairo University Press to print their statements.

Arwa Saleh and Siham Sabri led sit-in strikes in Cairo University, and alongside many others, composed essays for wall posters, slogans, read poetry and performed plays. When the police stormed the campus on 29 December 1972, both student leaders were arrested and spent time in jail. In late December 1972 and early January 1973, students occupied Tahrir Square in Cairo (a scene remembered and replicated in January 2011). Despite state repression and the lack of an independent press, the students gained support from the public who joined the call to liberate Sinai from Israel and end authoritarianism. Saleh's deep engagement and involvement in these protests would inform her later work. al-Mubtasarun [The Stillborn] would reflect on the legacy of the 1960s student leaders—who she termed as 'the melancholy generation'—and the frustrated hopes of the student movement of the 1970s who failed to translate mass nationalist support into support for an agenda tackling class inequity, wealth redistribution and other social issues—as such, to her this generation is 'premature'.

Salih became a member of the central committee of the Egyptian Communist Workers Party, a large organization that grew out of the student movement of 1972 and was also involved in the 1977 uprisings against Sadat's economic liberalization policies. But many Marxist and other leftist organizations were small circles of intellectuals, with a limited base among workers, and riven with minor theoretical differences. Many activists and intellectuals in these circles drifted away from the movement in the 1980s—they quit political activism and joined non-governmental organizations, international humanitarian agencies, or Islamist movements.

== Later life and published writing ==
Salih's depression at the failure of the revolutionary Left's promise and the reality of Egypt in the 1980s led her to break away from the party. She later left for Spain. She wrote in this period, reflecting on her bitterness with the organizations she was once involved with, the sexual exploitation that women suffered within communist organizations and the behaviour of male intellectuals within the party and movement. In work later published posthumously, she wrote that she had received psychiatric treatment while she was away. Her first manuscript (which was lost and never published) and a posthumously published autobiographical text 'Strolling: Daydream of a Lonely Rover' was dedicated to patients in psychiatric clinics. She later also published an Arabic translation of Tony Cliff's 1984 book Class Struggle and Women's Liberation.

Her most prominent work al-Mubtasarun [The Premature or The Stillborn] was a memoir of her experience in the student movement of the 1970s, with the stated goal of the 1990s generation perhaps learning from the mistakes of the 1960s and 70s. The book was published five years after she wrote it, and was issued with a new introduction. The book takes aim at hierarchical structures within communist organizations based on age, seniority and frequently, gender, accusing male activists of 'consuming' women in the movement, preying on young women and sexually defaming them if they resisted male advances. She also criticizes the pretence of intellectualism among communist leaders, prioritizing publication over effectively organizing resistance to the regime or attempting to gain public support for their goals.

Sana' al-Masri stated that Salih had to secure a job when her supervisor at al-'Alam al-Yawm, a former Marxist activist, persecuted her for the publication of al-Mubtasarun, to prove to the newspaper's management that he disavowed his Marxist past. But Salih's sharp criticism of her former comrades in al-Mubtasarun, many of whom now headed Western-funded organizations, meant that many of them refused to hire her too.

Throughout her adult life, she suffered from clinical depression and episodes of schizophrenia. After a number of unsuccessful attempts, she committed suicide in 1997, a few months after the publication of al-Mubtasarun.

== Personal life ==
Salih married three times—twice to communist intellectuals, and one brief marriage to a much younger poet of the 1990s generation. She was involved romantically with several comrades in the movement over her life, and wrote in al-Mubtasarun of the treatment of women and sexual liberation by male intellectuals in leftist circles, though without referring directly to her own experiences. Her first real lover, to whom she dedicated the book, was the young intellectual Baha' al-Naqqash.

== Death and posthumous publications ==
In 1997 Arwa Saleh committed suicide by jumping from a tenth floor apartment. The event is referred to in Ahdaf Soueif's 1999 novel The Map of Love, and Soueif and Salih had studied together in the English Department at Cairo University in the early 1970s. Her death has also been given fictional treatment in Radwa Ashour's 2008 novel Release as well as Youssef Rakha's 2014 novel The Crocodiles. In Fathi Imbabi's al-Sab'iyyun (The 1970s Generation), Imbabi published a long eulogy for Salih without mentioning her name apart from in the dedication, holding her comrades (including himself) as responsible for her depression and suicide.

A short and hastily edited selection of her papers was published in 1998—these included an excerpt from her memoirs, a long poem and an essay on the novelist Son'allah Ibrahim's fiction —and was titled Saratan al-Rawh (Cancer of the Soul). al-Mubtasarun was later reissued in 2016, by the Egyptian General Book Organization, a Ministry of Culture organ, as part of its 'family library' series.

== Works ==
- al-Mubtasarun [The Premature Ones], 1996. Translated into English by Samah Selim, 2016.
- Saratan al-Rawh [Cancer of the Soul], 1998. Cairo: Dar al-Nahr.
