= The Guard (novel) =

2008 novel by Ezzat el Kamhawi

- Author: Ezzat el Kamhawi
- Language: Arabic
- Genre: Novel
- Published: 2008
- Publisher: Elain Publishing House
- Publication place: Egypt
- Preceded by: A room overlooking the Nile
- Followed by: Book seductiveness

The Guard (Arabic: الحارس, romanized: El Hares) is Ezzat el Kamhawi's third novel, and sixth book, released by el-Ain publishing in 2008.

== Background ==
The Guard came as an important example of alienation, which affects humans when they put themselves in the service of authoritarian power to the extent of absence, through the life of lieutenant Waheed who joined the Cavalry to guard the president.

Lt. Waheed becomes integrated with his work to the degree of loss of his private life completely, his features becomes more and more similar with other guards. Waheed devotes himself to serving the security system and live in the hope of seeing the President one day, but never achieve his hope, because whenever the President decides to go out, there are forty processions leaving the gates of the palace, and as much air processions, with the president in one of them, or not in any of them at all.
