= The City of Pleasure (Ezzat el Kamhawi novel) =

- Author: Ezzat el Kamhawi
- Language: Arabic
- Publisher: First Edition: the General Organization for Cultural Centers 1997; Second Edition: Elain Publishing House 2009
- Publication place: Egypt
- Preceded by: It Happened in the land of Dust and Mud
- Followed by: Times for Joy

The City of Pleasure Arabic: مدينة اللذة is Ezzat el Kamhawi's first novel, and second book after It Happened in the land of Dust and Mud (stories). It was first released by the General Organization for Cultural Centers in 1997, second edition by el-Ain publishing in 2009. In his novel, Kamhawi attempted to personify an entire city where he deals with issues related to love and sex. The characters are portrayed as simple passerby who narrate the city's story and who live in it, with it and for it.

== Plot ==
A city like no other, guarded by the goddess of pleasure and, ruled by a licentious king who dedicated his time to carnal pleasures and a princess who dreams of love and tender empathy. The priests decide to design the walls of the princess's room with figures of embracing lovers and burnt incense and chanted their magical incantations that the pictures on the wall may come to life and the dream of the princess for true love might come true.

People real and shadowy, strong slaves and emperors have met their doom at the gates of the City of Pleasure. Eventually the gates of the impenetrable city succumbs under the charm of two ingenious commodities: fried potatoes and pepsi-cola. No one knows the real history of the City of Pleasure and no welcome visitor has ever escaped its enchantment.

This is the novel that has been structured from human myths melted down and recreated one of the most perfectly executed literary whims. It is no longer possible to speak of modern Arabic literary narrative without including The City of Pleasure and the enriching addition it has provided to the art of the modern Arabic novel par excellence.

== Quotes ==
Gamal El-Ghitani:

A novel belonging to a new writing and a newer vision, where tradition is mixed with contemporary life, this novel represents a strong distinct voice, accompanied by other voices in the literary scene now establishing new insights that can accommodate the concerns of man and reality to express them in different ways.

Abdel Rahman el-Abnudi:

Fast and light as a snake, which is terrifying yet afraid, el-Kmahawi borrows the city's language, to face it with its legends stripping its cover that doesn't cover any defects.

Mohamed Abd al-Muttalib:

A novel with a free horizon that doesn't recognize time-constraints or place limits.

Nabil Soliman:

It is the city of wonders where facts seems as shadows of other facts.
