= Anthony Calderbank =

English translator

Anthony Calderbank is an English translator of contemporary Arabic literature. He was educated at Manchester University, where he studied Arabic and Persian. He lived in Egypt for several years in the mid-1980s, making his home in the Cairo neighbourhood of Shubra. From 1987 to 1990, he lived in England teaching Arabic at Salford University, before he finally moved back again to Egypt, taking up a teaching post at the American University in Cairo. From 2000, Calderbank worked for the British Council in Saudi Arabia, living in Khobar and Riyadh. Most recently, Calderbank became Country Director of the British Council in the new state of South Sudan.

Calderbank has translated a number of works from the Arabic literary canon into English. These include:

- Blue Aubergine by Miral Al-Tahawy
- Gazelle Tracks by Miral Al-Tahawy
- The Tent by Miral Al-Tahawy
- Nights of Musk by Haggag Hassan Oddoul
- Munira's Bottle by Yousef Al-Mohaimeed
- Wolves of the Crescent Moon by Yousef Al-Mohaimeed (alternate title: The Lure of Scent) (nominated for the 2010 Jan Michalski Prize)
- Rhadopis of Nubia by Naguib Mahfouz
- Zaat by Sonallah Ibrahim
- Land of Thyme and Stone, a collection of Palestinian short stories edited by Nur and Abdelwahab El Messiri

His work has appeared in several issues of Banipal magazine.

== See also ==
- List of Arabic-English translators
