= Khairy Shalaby =

Egyptian writer (1938–2011)

Khairy Shalaby OSA
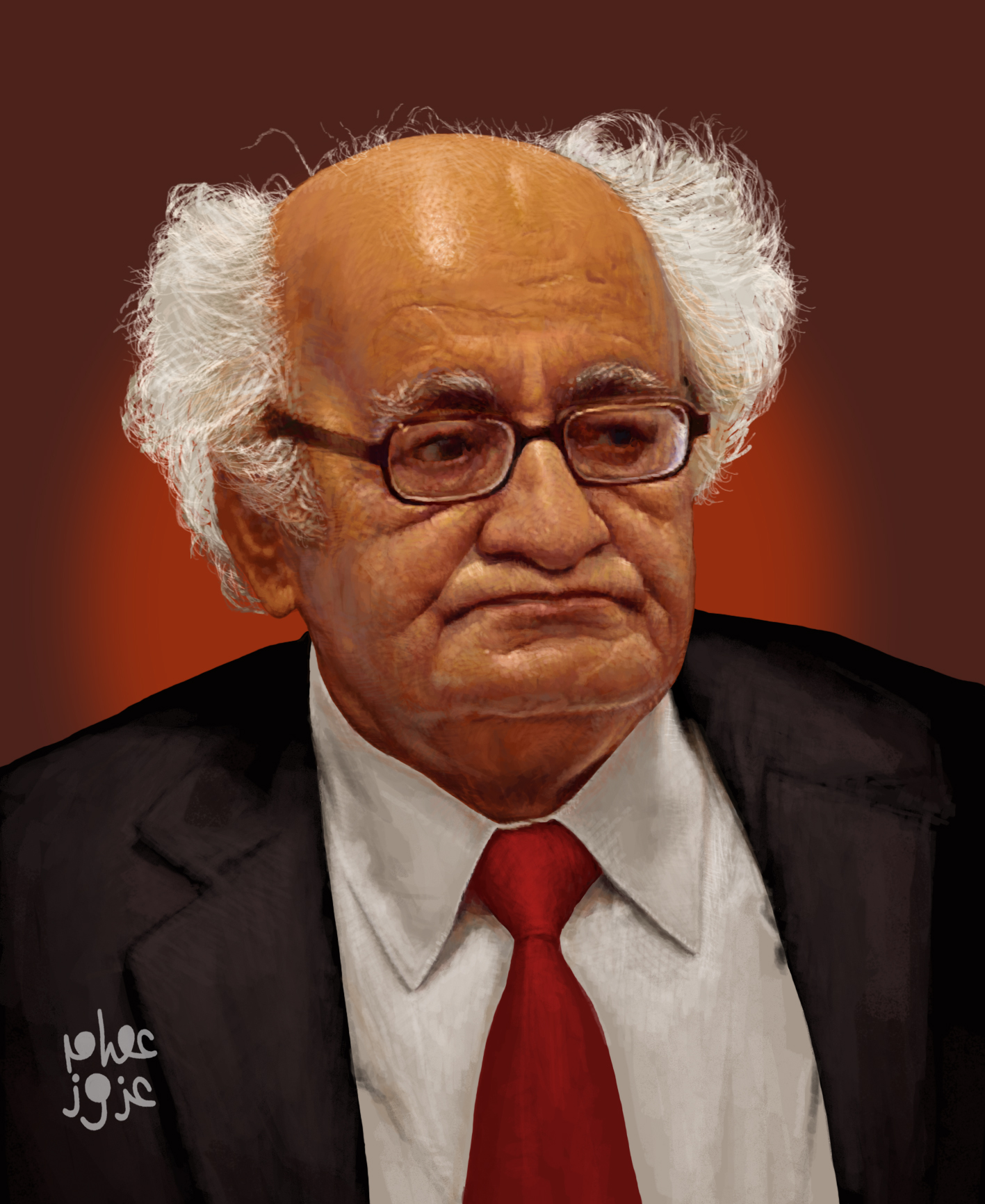
- Khairy Shabaly
- Native name: خيري شلبي
- Born: January 31, 1938 Kafr al-Shaykh, Egypt
- Died: September 9, 2011 (aged 73) Cairo, Egypt

Khairy Shalaby (Arabic: خيري شلبي, romanized: Khayrī Shalabī; January 31, 1938 – 9 September 2011) was an Egyptian novelist and writer. He wrote some 70 books, including twenty novels, critical studies, historical tales, plays and short story collections. Khairy is widely regarded as having written novels “of the Egyptian street.”

Adam Talib, who translated The Hashish Waiter, said of Shalaby’s prose:

The most enjoyable—and the most difficult—quality about Khairy’s prose is the way he mixes language levels (registers) within a single sentence or paragraph. Khairy doesn’t go in for the prophetic or philosophical or pompous-sounding stuff…and he really seems to be having a lot of fun when he writes. I guess what I’m trying to say is that Khairy doesn’t spend a lot of time looking up from the story. He doesn’t look over his shoulder like some writers and he doesn’t spend too much energy worrying about what ‘the critics’ will say. I haven’t asked him but I’m fairly certain he’s never spent a second thinking about how this might sound when it’s translated ... In many ways, Arabic novels are still having a conversation with the culture at large—they’re very engaged—and it’s reflected in this style of novel. Khairy Shalaby is an important artist and also a very good critic, but he doesn’t go in for that sort of thing. Like Yusuf al-Qa'id, Khairy tries to show that novels don’t have to be explicitly intellectual, or about intellectuals, to handle important political and social questions in a very sophisticated way.

== Honors ==
Shalaby's The Lodging House won the Naguib Mahfouz Medal for Literature in 2003. The Lodging House was listed by the Arab Writers Union as one of the “top 105” books of the last century. Istasia was longlisted for the 2010 International Prize for Arabic Fiction.

== Works ==
English translated

- The Hashish Waiter
- The Lodging House
- The Time-Travels of the Man Who Sold Pickles and Sweets
