= Alia Mamdouh =

Iraqi novelist, author, and journalist

- Born: 1944 (age 81–82); Baghdad, Iraq
- Education: University of Mustansiriya
- Occupations: Novelist, Author, Journalist
- Writing career
- Language: Arabic
- Genre: Fiction

Alia Mamdouh, also spelled Aliyah Mamduh (Arabic: عالية ممدوح, romanized: ʻĀliyah Mamdūḥ; born 1944) is an Iraqi novelist, author, and journalist living in exile in Paris, France.

She won the 2004 Naguib Mahfouz Medal for Literature for her novel The Loved Ones. She is most known for her widely acclaimed and translated book Naphtalene, originally written in Arabic. Her 2020 novel The Tank was shortlisted for the International Prize for Arabic Fiction.

Mamdouh was born in Baghdad, Iraq in 1944. After completing her degree in psychology from the University of Mustansiriya in 1971, while at the same time working as editor-in-chief of Al Rasid magazine and editor of al-Fikr al-mua’sir magazine, Mamdouh decided to move in 1982. She has since lived in Beirut, Morocco, and finally Paris, where she currently lives. She continues to write.

She cites Albert Camus as an influence.

Mamdouh writes in Arabic, and two of her works have been translated to English: Naphtalene (translated by Peter Thereoux) and The Loved Ones (translated by Marilyn Booth).

Most Mamdouh's books are about Iraq, though she has lived abroad for decades. On the idea of writing about her country while outside of it, she has stated: "Every day I look at my country’s situation and depict its virtues and delights, atrocities and grievances in each novel....I did not leave it, and so it did not leave me."

Her first novel, Naphtalene, published soon after she left Iraq, tells the story of a young girl growing up in Baghdad in the 1940s and 1950s.

== Works ==
- Overture for Laughter (short stories) (1973)
- Habbat-al-Naphatalin / Naphtalene: A Novel of Baghdad (Original Arabic published by al-Hay'ah al-Masriah Al-Amah lil-Kitab, Cairo, 1986; Arabic translation published by Garnet in 1986 by Peter Theroux)
- ftitahiya lil Dahik (Prelude to Laughter) (1971)
- Hawamish ilal Sayyida Ba (Notes to Mrs. B) (1973)
- Layla wa Al-Dhib (Laila and the Wolf) (1981)
- Habbat Al-Naftalin (Mothballs) (1986)
- Al-Wala (Passion) (1993)
- Al-Ghulama (The Maiden) (2000)
- The Loved Ones (2003)
- Al-Mahbubat (2005)
- The Tank (2020)

== See also ==
- Iraqi literature
- Full list of winners and nominees for the International Prize for Arabic Fiction
