= Hammour Ziada =

Sudanese writer and journalist (born 1979)

- Born: 1979 (age 46–47); Omdurman, Sudan
- Occupations: Novelist, journalist
- Writing career
- Language: Arabic
- Genre: Fiction
- Notable works: Shawq al-darwīsh (The Longing of the Dervish) (2014); The Drowning (2022)
- Notable awards: Naguib Mahfouz Medal for Literature (2014); Shortlisted for the International Prize for Arabic Fiction (2015)

Hammour Ziada (Arabic: حمور زيادة, born 1979) is a Sudanese writer and journalist, born in Omdurman. He has worked as a civil society and human rights researcher, and currently works as journalist in Cairo. Before, he had been writing for a number of left-wing newspapers in Sudan. Two of his novels were selected for Arabic literary awards and appeared in English translations.

== Life and career ==
In Sudan, Ziada worked for national newspapers, including Al-Mustaqilla, Ajras al-Horriya, and Al-Jarida. At Al-Akhbar, he served as the culture editor.

Ziada has published several volumes of fiction in Arabic, and is best known for his second novel Shawq al-darwīsh (The Longing of the Dervish), which won the prestigious Naguib Mahfouz Prize in Egypt in 2014 and was also nominated for the 2015 International Prize for Arabic Fiction. This novel, that takes place during the Mahdist state, and several of his stories have appeared in English translation, including the anthology The Book of Khartoum, as well as in Banipal magazine.

In 2019, a feature film by Sudanese filmmaker Amjad Abu Alala, You Will Die at Twenty, based on Hammour Ziada’s short story “Sleeping at the Foot of the Mountain” (“النوم عند قدمي الجبل“), won awards at the Venice International Film Festival, as well as at other international film festivals.

His third novel The Drowning, translated by Paul G. Starkey, presents the social repercussions in a Sudanese rural town by the river Nile after a military coup in the capital in 1968, a few months before the end of the democratic era during the government of President Ismail al-Azhari.

The paradise river carried wooden boats, conquerors’ barges, the corpses of the drowned, and the victims of massacres. Married couples, children after circumcision, and women after childbirth plunged into it….The paradise river often dried up and destroyed. But every time it went back to what it had been: a gentle river, coming from paradise.

— Hammour Ziada, The Drowning

== Reception ==
Tahia Abdel Nasser, one of the judges for the Naguib Mahfouz Prize wrote about The Longing of the Dervish:

It gestures to a new Sudanese literature with its intricately woven history, exploration of race, and its richly layered intertexts. Not only is it a love story woven through the story of war, violence, fanaticism, and slavery, but it is also a timeless evocation of oppression everywhere.

— Tahia Abdel Nasser

In a 2023 article by the Wall Street Journal, The Drowning was named as one of the five best novels from the Horn of Africa.

== Original works in Arabic and English translations ==
- A Life Story from Omdurman (short stories, 2008)
- Al-Kunj (novel, 2010)
- Sleeping at the Foot of the Mountain (short stories, 2014)
- Shawq al-darwīsh (The Longing of the Dervish) (novel, 2014), translated by Jonathan Wright in 2016, ISBN 978-9774167881
- The Void, short story, trans. Kareem James Abu-Zeid. In Raph Cormack and Max Shmookler (eds.) The Book of Khartoum. (2016) ISBN 978-1905583720
- Al-Gharaq (novel, 2019), The Drowning, (2022), trans. Paul G. Starkey, ISBN 978-1623719067

== Awards ==
- Naguib Mahfouz Medal for Literature 2014
- Shortlist of The International Prize for Arabic Fiction (IPAF) 2015

== See also ==
- Sudanese literature
- List of Sudanese writers
- Modern Arabic literature
