= Mohamed Makhzangi =

Egyptian doctor and writer (born 1950)

Mohamed Makhzangi (born 1950) is an Egyptian doctor and writer.

== Early life ==
He was born in the town of Mansourah in the Nile Delta. He studied medicine, and specialized in psychology and alternative medicine during a stint in the Soviet Union in the 1980s. He was based in the Ukrainian city of Kiev at the time of the Chernobyl disaster

== Career ==
In 1986, and this formed the basis of his book Memories Of A Meltdown. Makhzangi gave up on medicine to become a journalist and writer. He worked for the Kuwaiti arts and culture magazine Al-Arabi before moving back to Cairo. He has published a number of short story collections and novels.
