= Huzama Habayeb =

Palestinian writer

- حزامة حبايب
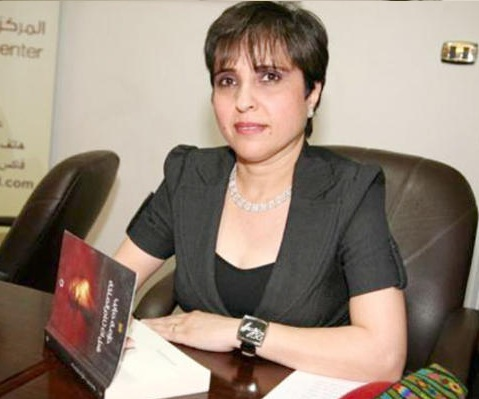
- Habayeb at the Arab Cultural Center in Amman, Jordan in 2011
- Born: June 4, 1965 (age 61); Kuwait
- Citizenship: Jordanian
- Education: Kuwait University (B.A.)
- Occupation: Writer
- Writing career
- Language: Arabic
- Period: 1990–present
- Website: facebook.com/huzamahabayeb

Huzama Habayeb (Arabic: ْحُزَامَة حَبَايِب) is a Palestinian novelist, storyteller, columnist, translator, and poet who has won multiple awards such as the Mahmoud Seif Eddin Al-Erani Award for Short Stories, Jerusalem Festival of Youth Innovation in Short Stories, and Naguib Mahfouz Medal for Literature. Upon graduating from Kuwait University in 1987 with a Bachelor of Arts in English language and Literature, she pursued careers in journalism, teaching, and translation before she eventually started to write professionally as a published author. She is a member of both the Jordanian Writers Association and the Arab Writers Federation.

== Personal life ==
Habayeb was born on June 4, 1965, in Kuwait, where she also grew up and studied. She obtained her B.A. in English Language and Literature from Kuwait University in 1987. Forced by the Gulf War that erupted a few years after her graduation, Habayeb—along with her family members—moved to Jordan and settled there for years before she relocated to the United Arab Emirates, where she currently lives.

== Employment ==
Before writing became her profession, Habayeb had worked in different fields. She first worked in journalism in Kuwait and worked as a teacher and translator after moving to Jordan. But even after achieving recognition as an eminent writer, she opted to remain existent within the domains of journalism and translation. She has translated several English books into Arabic.

== Writing career ==
Habayeb's writings are majorly fiction, although she also writes non-fiction. The three main literary genres her bibliography includes are poetry, short stories, and novels.

=== Poetry ===
Although Habayeb is known to be a prose writer, her early beginnings were with poetry—particularly, free verse. In May 1990, a collection of fourteen free-verse poems by Habayeb—under the title "Images"—were published in the 23rd issue of An-Naqid magazine, a London-based magazine that has closed down.

The most notable poetry work by Habayeb is a poetry collection called "Begging," published in 2009 by the Arab Institute for Research and Publishing (AIRP), which is the publishing house that has published most of her works. The collection has received rave reviews from critics. Al Ghad newspaper, in an article published on October 14, 2009, commended Habayeb's new release and concluded by saying "through this different written work of hers, Huzama Habayeb is not seeking to announce another aspect of her creative experience, by marching towards poetry after writing shorty stories and novels and excelling at both realms; she's rather seeking to vigorously breathe out the obsessions of the nearby woman within her depths, who is desirous of breeding glowing words, for writing here is an act of salvation that is concerned with not only the aesthetic aspect, but also every other formidable and different aspect."

The following is a translation of an excerpt from "Begging" collection:

Contemplate me...

I walk on water, buttressed by transparent gravel;

I braid the air, making plaits you climb on to reach my heart;

I spin the clouds, weaving a pillow for your elbow;

I embroider lit moons onto the sky's sheet that I unfold and lay out above your image; and yet..

Am I still unworthy of your love?

— Huzama Habayeb, Begging

=== Short stories ===
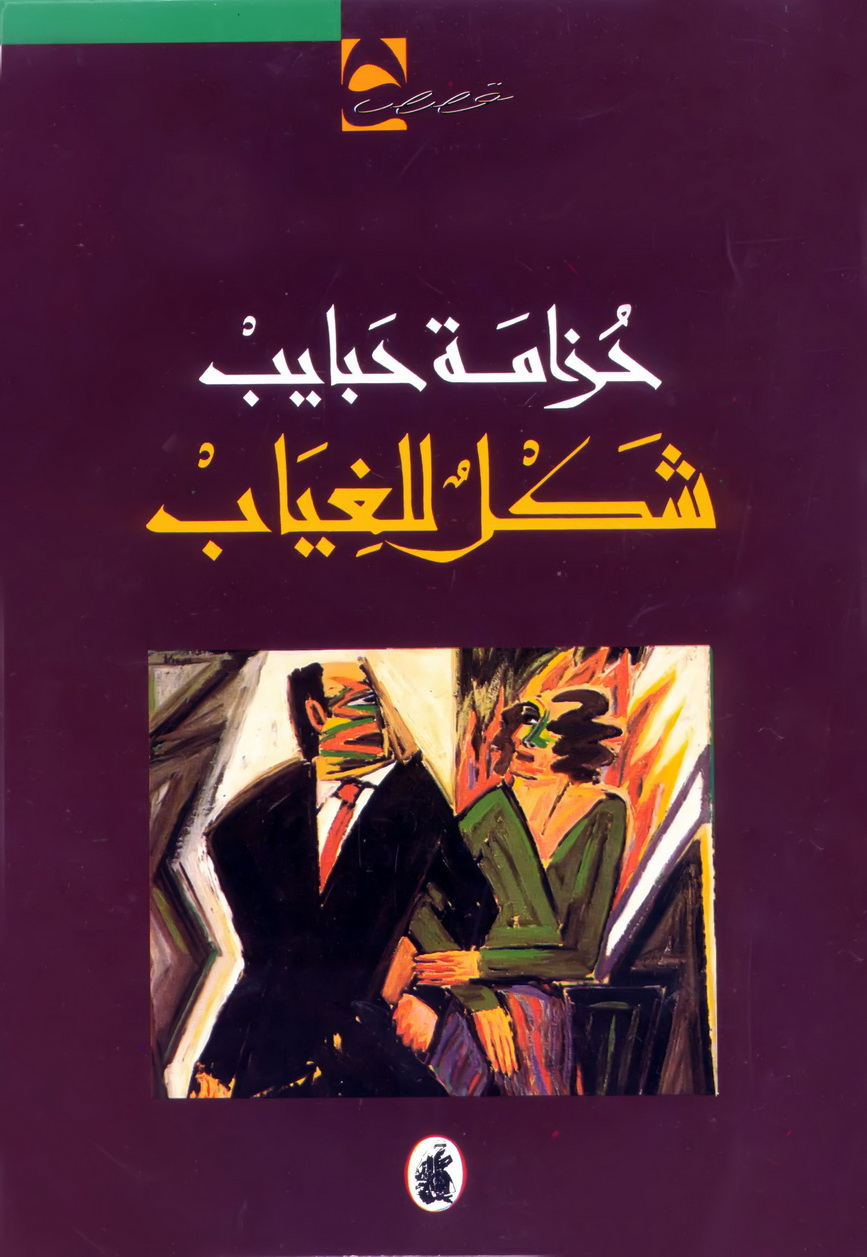
The cover of Habayeb's third short story collection, "A Form of Absence"

The most literary form that has immensely contributed to Habayeb's regional fame is the short story, which culminated in 1992 when she received her first writing award: Jerusalem Festival of Youth Innovation in Short Stories for her debut short-story collection, "The Man Who Recurs" (الرَّجُل الذي يَتَكرَّر) published by AIRP. Two years later—after the publication of her second short-story collection, "The Faraway Apples" (التُفَّاحات البَعيدَة) in 1994 by Al-Karmel Publishing House—the Jordanian Writers Association awarded Habayeb with her second short-story prize, Mahmoud Seif Eddin Al-Erani Award.

In 1997, published by AIRP, Habayeb put out her third short-story collection: "A Form of Absence" (شَكْلٌ للغِياب,) which was "a turning point" in Habayeb's "writing technique," as she personally said on a cultural TV show aired on Al Jazeera on May 4, 2004. She explained that all the women characters in the different stories could actually be the same person; all of those personas felt as if they "belonged to one woman," which is why "many critics saw within this collection a nucleus or a seed for a novel."

"Sweeter Night" (لَيْلٌ أحْلَى,) which was released in 2002—and also by AIRP—was the fourth and last short-story collection Habayeb had gotten published before she made the transition into novel. The collection resulted in more positive feedback from critics. A review that was published on February 1, 2002, in Al-Hayat, the London-based newspaper, praised the collection saying "it excavates the same spots her stories usually tackle, but the digging in this new collection is deeper, farther, richer and bolder than it has ever been before. Furthermore, the stories here—in terms of narrative and linguistic technicalities—are more fermented and possessive of vision and tools simultaneously."

=== Novels ===
After four successful short-story collections, Habayeb wrote her first novel, "The Origin of Love" (أصْل الهَوَى,) which was published by AIRP in 2007. The novel provoked a storm of controversy due to the abounding, brazen, sexual content in it; which is presented via both intimation and explicitness. That content caused the novel to be banned in Jordan, where it was printed, upon a directive made by the Department of Press and Publications. On a program broadcast by the Norwegian TV channel NRK2, Habayeb addressed the explicitly sexual and erotic language she occasionally resorts to in her writing emphasizing that "we have to put it the way it is."

When asked in an interview with Al Ghad newspaper on November 28, 2008, about her opinion on the ban decision, Habayeb said that "the media rhetoric flaunts the support of public liberties—and atop them the freedom of speech and writing—but the reality says there's an utter lack of intellectual tolerance; and determination to impose a siege on intellect, limit liberties, confiscate pens, and fabricate taboos on lame pretexts, stemming from a fact that entails imposing a culture of fear and subjection to the system and the official cultural institution." She also noted that "the 'pornography' reason is not the real reason behind the ban decision; and the Department of Press and Publications hasn't provided me yet with a direct, candid reason."

The critical reactions on "The Origin of Love" (أصْلُ الهَوَى,) have been highly positive. The Palestinian novelist and literary critic, Waleed Abu Bakr, wrote a critical article about the novel in August 2007, in which he described it as "a serious, significant novel in terms of narration techniques or the importance of the issues and crucial themes it tackles." He also added that "all the well-structured, plentiful sex scenes do not merely aim to arouse—which is something the reader can feel without any suspicion due to the absence of eroticism in its cliched, tacky form—but to achieve gender equality."

And in its article on February 14, 2007, Asharq Al-Awsat newspaper said "Huzama Habyeb has written a political novel without writing a single letter in politics; and that's whence the beauty of this text emanates; the text that is drowned in the body's temptations and the details of the everyday life of the men whose external features haven't been described by the author." The article ends by praising Habayeb's linguistic methodology: "One must note the fastidious language, the intelligent allegories and lexicon that demonstrate a rich dictionary, in which the popular Palestinian vocabulary stands out, gaining an eloquent impact derived from its fluency in conveying the meaning to the reader."

Four years after her debut novel, Habayeb's second novel "Before the Queen Falls Asleep" (قَبْلَ أن تَنامَ المَلِكَة) got published. The novel, along with the critical acclaim and being deemed "a quantum leap" in her writing, has achieved popular success according to Goodreads. On a TV show that was aired on Sharjah TV channel on October 5, 2013, Habayeb stated that "this novel—within the narrative, tale-telling frame; and without any categorization or any regard to the interpretative or critical perusal— is a story of a woman who's telling her story to her daughter who's about to study abroad."

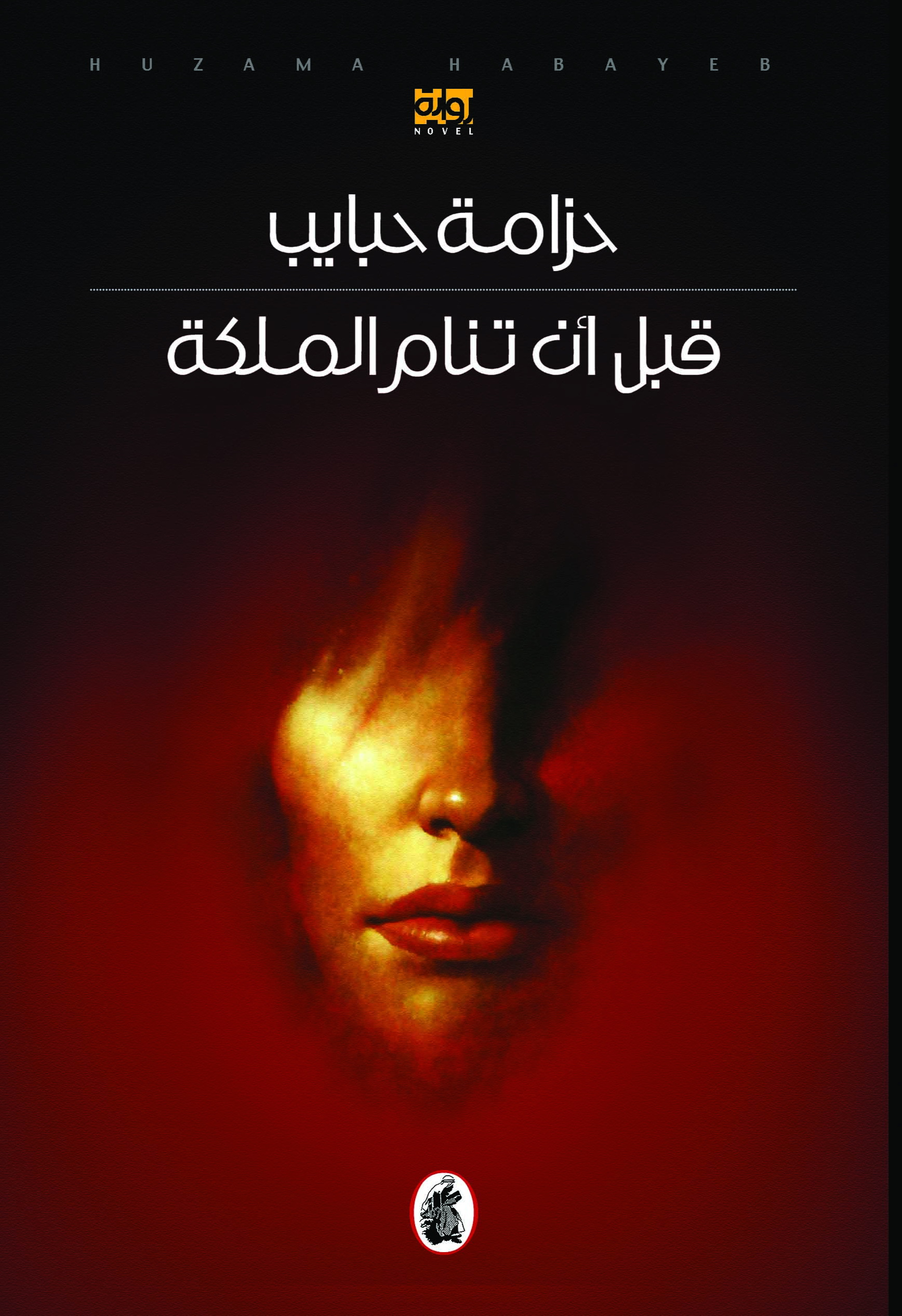
The cover of Habayeb's second novel "Before the Queen Falls Asleep"

Sabry Hafez, a renowned Egyptian writer and critic, described "Before the Queen Falls Asleep" (قَبْلَ أن تَنامَ المَلِكَة) as "a truly important novel, perhaps the most important, Palestinian novel by the second generation of Palestine's writers after the major Palestinian novels by Ghassan Kanafani, Emile Habibi, and Jabra Ibrahim Jabra. It's a novel that digs deep within the humane, Palestinian depth; and offers a narrative of the sins committed by the dishonest; Arabian reality against Palestinians—sins that degrade the humanity of that reality, and heighten the fortitude of Palestinians and the nobility of their stance. And since that she's an author of a generation that wasn't born in Palestine, her writing for Palestine acquires exacerbated significance that emphasizes the Palestinian right and its entrenchment within the cognizance and conscience. It's a novel that writes down the Palestinian woman like she has never been written before in such an efficacious and profound manner, and without any emotionalism."

This novel, which addresses the Palestinian perturbation, is "the most daring Palestinian novel ever written by a woman who defyingly, candidly, stubbornly and straightforwardly describes what inflicts the woman during the hardship of displacement," according to the Palestine-based newspaper, Assafir. The novel was also among The Guardian's "Books of the Year 2012" list, as chosen by Ahdaf Soueif. The critic Mohammed Baradah, in an article in Al Hayat newspaper, commended Habayeb's "attractive, artistic form; multilevel language; flowing ability of describing; and cynical humor."

Waleed Abu Bakr described it as a novel of "surplus motherhood." He concluded that "the author is possessed with the notion of loss—which dominates the atmosphere of this novel—and she represents the motive for the expectations within; and so she approaches what she has been seeking since a long time ago; and she has struggled to write about life as she has struggled to live it; and in both cases she deserves respect."

In "Before the Queen Falls Asleep" (قَبْلَ أنْ تَنامَ المَلِكَة,) according to Al Ghad newspaper, "Habayeb draws thorny and suspenseful pages that are preoccupied with pain and stumble over the concept of loss for a woman who's attempting to question love, approach life within the minimum level of personal and general defeat, clarify the meaning that is devoid of metaphor of existence, and beg the homeland; as a charming idea through telling her story to her daughter. The queen in this story is the mother; and it's also the daughter, as each one gives the other a possible—or even probable—reason to live."

The following is the English translation of an excerpt taken from "Before the Queen Falls Asleep" (قَبْلَ أنْ تَنامَ المَلِكَة):

And when we're caught by the night, and the sorrows betake themselves to their bedchambers, you come to me barefoot with half of your hair falling down your face; giving off the aromas of fresh perspiration from your reckless daydreams, the remnants of the chocolate you're masticating in your mouth without a considerable sense of guiltiness over betraying your fragile diet, and the bread that has been toasted to the limit of burning and whose crumbs bombard the blouse of your pajamas. You tuck yourself in bed beside me. You sniff my naked arm, saying you love the smell of my flesh; and that you're seeking it or something that resembles it in your faraway city, but you don't find it. You plunge your nose in my neck, saying to me: 'Tell me your story!'

— Huzama Habayeb, Before the Queen Falls Asleep

In January 2016, and through AIRP, Habayeb got her third novel published. The novel, which is titled "Velvet" (مُخْمَل), depicts Palestinian camps in a realistic style, addressing "social, economic, and even cultural" woes while avoiding sentimental clichés. The novel's heroine, who is named Hawwa (the Arabic equivalent of "Eve"), perseveres through a series of shattering incidents and fulfills her desires despite the merciless odds. "Velvet" won the 2017 Naguib Mahfouz Medal for Literature.

The following is an English translation of an excerpt from Velvet (مُخْمَل):

That was the first time Hawwa saw a man crying; she believed that the most beautiful men were the grieved ones. It was also the first time she had the feeling that she could be more than just a woman—a woman who is loved; a woman who is yearned for; a woman who is desired; a woman who is craved after for what she is; a woman who is sought after only for the life she snatches; a woman for whom is longed for the warmth that lingers inside her despite the days of cold, staleness, and void; a woman who is pitied for the dearth of love in her past; a woman who is envied for her prolonged patience with her past; a woman who is forgiven for her little talk about love, hankering, and anguish.

That was the first time Hawwa felt she might be in love. Who knows? Perhaps that love is similar to the one told in love stories and talked about by people.

— Huzama Habayeb, Velvet

=== Nonfiction ===
Throughout her life, Habayeb has written for several daily and periodical newspapers and magazines such as Al Ra'i, Ad-Dustour, Doha Magazine, Al-Qafilah Magazine, and Dubai Al-Thakafiya, a monthly magazine in which she has her own column at present. Habayeb addresses several topics in her nonfictional pieces—politics, literature, social issues, art, anthropology and personal experiences.

And until the painful moment of revelation, the sea can mollify the homeland's drowning sons and throw them onto the unfamiliar beaches amidst the colorful shells. And if they were lucky, they'll be lying on the beach—the burial ground, fully clothed; and with their shoe laces tightly tied so they'd look as if they fell off due to tiredness after hiking or having fun, or as if they're sleeping and they don't want anyone to disturb them or wake them up.

— Huzama Habayeb, A translated excerpt taken from "The Defeated Homeland" article, published in October 2015, in Dubai Al-Thakafiya.

== International presence ==
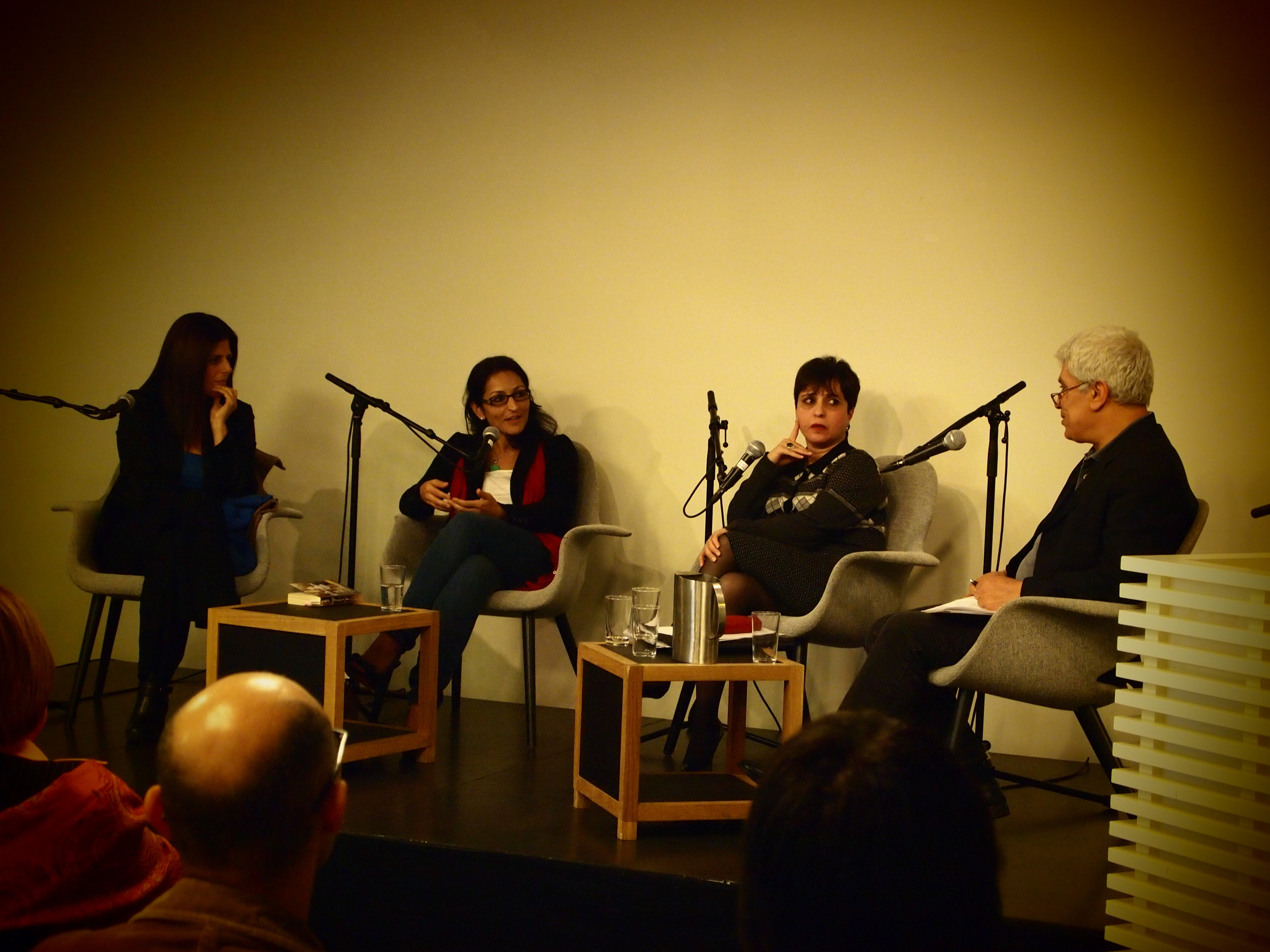
Habayeb during "Viewing Palestine" event in Oslo.

Despite being an Arab author whose entire published fiction is written in Arabic, Habayeb has managed to develop an international reputation through participating in multiple cultural events that took place outside the Arab World, and having some of her pieces translated into English. In September 2011, Habayeb participated in "Viewing Palestine;" a cultural, literary event about Palestinian literature held in Oslo. The event included seminars of talks and readings with several Palestinian authors, among whom was Habayeb. She also partook in a cultural event hosted by Hankuk University of Foreign Studies in April 2012, in which she—along with two other writers—gave a lecture about the discrimination to which Palestinians in Arab states are subject.

Some of Habayeb's stories have been translated into English, which has helped the echo of her literary voice reach more readers worldwide. The London-based magazine Banipal has published several pieces by Habayeb translated into English such as the short story "Sweeter Night" (لَيلٌ أحْلَى) from the collection with the same name, and the twelfth chapter of the novel "Before the Queen Falls Asleep" (قَبْلَ أنْ تَنَامَ المَلِكَة).

She was also one of the contributors in "Qissat," an anthology of short stories written by Palestinian women writers that was published in 2006. Habayeb's story was "Thread Snaps" (خَيْطٌ يَنْقَطِع) off her fourth short-story collection, "Sweeter Night" (لَيْلٌ أحْلَى).

== Political influence ==
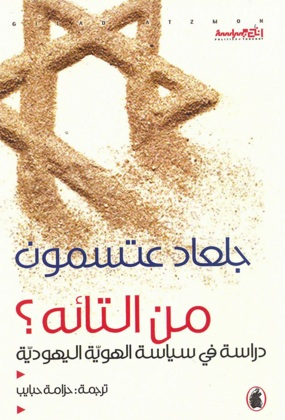
The cover of the Arabic version of "The Wandering Who"

In almost every body of work by Habayeb, whether a novel or short story, there is sheer adherence to her Palestinian identity; and that is strikingly evident in her first two novels and a slew of stories from her four collections. She also demonstrates that through her translations, as she tends to choose books whose content reflects the Palestinian crisis and the unjust policies exercised by Israel and affect Palestinians, such as The Wandering Who? by Gilad Atzmon, which she translated into Arabic and was published in this form in June 2013.

Habayeb's most prominent milestone in terms of defying Zionism, however, is a campaign she launched against the publication of an anthology of short stories by Middle Eastern women because of the inclusion of stories by Israeli authors. Habayeb had initially agreed to contribute to the anthology, but withdrew her piece after learning that contributions by two Israeli authors were included in the anthology; and then she contacted all the other Arab authors and persuaded them to follow her lead. The campaign was successful, as most of the authors withdrew their manuscripts, forcing the University of Texas at Austin—the institution that was adopting the project—to cancel the anthology. Habayeb justified her actions in an editorial that was published in Gulf News on May 25, 2012, saying, "I cannot accept, ethically and morally, that my voice be shared equally with writers who reflect the voice of an obnoxious occupier."

Habayeb's stance, relentless efforts, and courageous stand were applauded by many in the Arab world; and she received a lot of support and praise from various Arabic media outlets.

== Bibliography ==
The following is a list of all Habayeb's published works; and they're all written in Arabic:

- "The Man Who Recurs" (الرَّجُل الذي يَتَكرَّر) A short-story collection published in 1992 by the Arab Institute for Research and Publishing.
- "The Faraway Apples" (التُفَّاحات البَعِيدَة) A short-story collection published in 1994 by Al-Karmel Publishing House.
- "A Form of Absence" (شَكْلٌ للغِياب) A short-story collection published in 1997 by the Arab Institute for Research and Publishing.
- "Sweeter Night" (لَيْلٌ أحْلَى) A short-story collection published in 2002 by the Arab Institute for Research and Publishing.
- "The Origin of Love (أصْلُ الهَوَى) A novel published in 2007 by the Arab Institute for Research and Publishing.
- "Begging" (اسْتِجْداء) A poetry collection published in 2009 by the Arab Institute for Research and Publishing.
- "From Behind Windows" (مِنْ وَراء النَّوافِذ) An anthology of short stories published in 2010 by the Palestinian Ministry of Culture.
- "Before the Queen Falls Asleep" (قَبْلَ أن تَنامَ المَلِكَة) A novel published in 2011 by the Arab Institute for Research and Publishing.
- "Velvet" (مُخْمَل) A novel published in 2016 by the Arab Institute for Research and Publishing.
