= Naguib Mahfouz Medal for Literature =

Literary award for Arabic literature

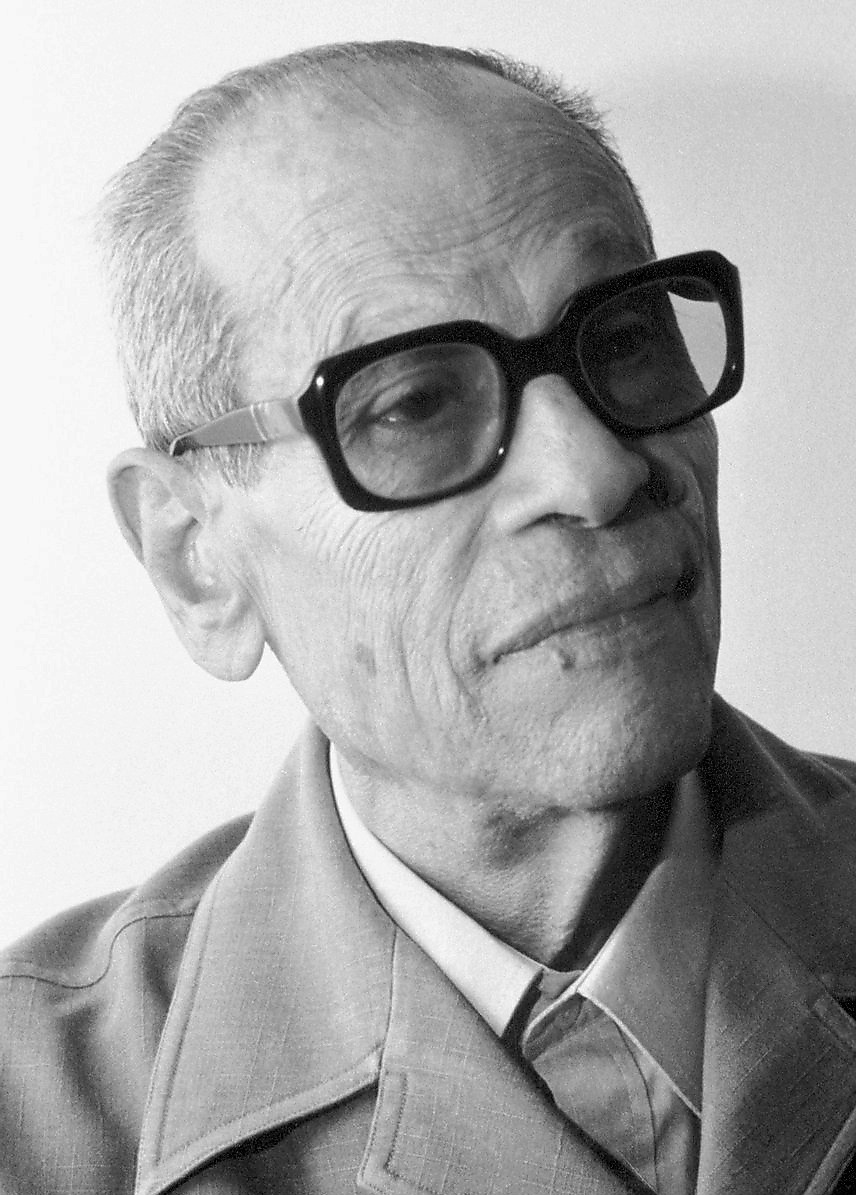
- Naguib Mahfouz
- Native name: جائزة نجيب محفوظ
- Country: Egypt
- Presented by: President of the American University in Cairo (AUC)
- Rewards: English translation and publication by AUC Press
- Website: https://aucpress.com/about-us/naguib-mahfouz-medal/

The Naguib Mahfouz Medal for Literature (Egyptian Arabic: جائزة نجيب محفوظ, romanized: Jāʼizat Najīb Maḥfūẓ) is a literary award for Arabic literature. It is given to the best contemporary novel written in Egyptian Arabic or Arabic but not available in English translation. The winning book is then translated into English, and published by American University in Cairo Press. It was first awarded in 1996 and is presented annually on December 11, the birthday of Nobel laureate Naguib Mahfouz, by the President of the American University in Cairo.

2011 was a unique year for the award because of the 2011 Egyptian revolution. The campuses of the American University in Cairo were operationally impacted and instead of presenting no award, AUCP gave the award to "the revolutionary creativity of the Egyptian people during the popular uprising that began on 25 January 2011."

== Winners ==
Previous winners:

- 1996: Ibrahim Abdel Meguid, The Other Place; and Latifa al-Zayyat, The Open Door
- 1997: Mourid Barghouti, I Saw Ramallah; and Yusuf Idris, City of Love and Ashes
- 1998: Ahlam Mosteghanemi, Memory in the Flesh
- 1999: Edwar al-Kharrat, Rama and the Dragon
- 2000: Hoda Barakat, The Tiller of Waters
- 2001: Somaya Ramadan, Leaves of Narcissus
- 2002: Bensalem Himmich, The Polymath
- 2003: Khairy Shalaby, The Lodging House
- 2004: Alia Mamdouh, The Loved Ones
- 2005: Yusuf Abu Rayya, Wedding Night
- 2006: Sahar Khalifeh, The Image, the Icon, and the Covenant
- 2007: Amina Zaydan, Red Wine
- 2008: Hamdi Abu Golayyel, A Dog with No Tail
- 2009: Khalil Sweileh, The Scribe of Love
- 2010: Miral al-Tahawy, Brooklyn Heights
- 2011: Awarded to "the revolutionary creativity of the Egyptian people"
- 2012: Ezzat el Kamhawi, House of the Wolf
- 2013: Khaled Khalifa, No Knives in this City's Kitchens
- 2014: Hammour Ziada, Shawq al-darwish (The Longing of the Dervish)
- 2015: Hassan Daoud, La Tareeq Ila Al-Jannah ('No Road to Paradise')
- 2016: Adel Esmat, Hikayat Yusuf Tadrus ('The Tales of Yusuf Tadrus', 'حكايات يوسف تادرس')
- 2017: Huzama Habayeb, (Velvet, 'مُخْمَل')
- 2018: Omaima Al-Khamis, ('Voyage of the Cranes in the Cities of Agate', 'مسرى الغرانيق في مدن العقيق')
- 2020: Ahmed Taibaoui, The Disappearance of Mr. Nobody (awarded 2021)
- 2022: Fatma Qandil, (Empty Cages)
- 2024: Mohammed Tarazi, (Muted Microphone, ميكروفون كاتم صوت)
