= Miral al-Tahawy =

Egyptian novelist and short story writer

Miral al-Tahawy (Arabic: ميرال الطحاوي, romanized: Mīrāl al-Ṭaḥāwī), also known as Miral Mahgoub, is an Egyptian novelist and short story writer. She comes from a conservative Bedouin background and is regarded as a pioneering literary figure. The Washington Post has described her as "the first novelist to present Egyptian Bedouin life beyond stereotypes and to illustrate the crises of Bedouin women and their urge to break free."

== Biography ==
She was born in a village in the Sharqia Governorate in the eastern Nile delta. Her Bedouin family belongs to the al-Hanadi tribe. Al-Tahawy is the youngest of seven children. She has stated that her progressive-thinking father was responsible for her obtaining an education, in spite of the constraints of traditional Bedouin society especially on women. She gained a BA in Arabic literature from Zagazig University, and then worked as a schoolteacher which allowed her to avoid early marriage. She then continued her education at Cairo University, moving to the city at the age of 26. This brought her into direct conflict with her family, and she also went through a difficult period of adjustment in the capital. Notwithstanding, she eventually earned a Masters and a PhD from Cairo University, and learnt several languages: classical Arabic, Hebrew, Persian, and English.

Al-Tahawy published her first book, a collection of short stories, in 1995. She was signed up by Hosni Soliman, owner of Dar Sharqiyyat and publisher of some of the most critically acclaimed Egyptian literature of the 1990s. Her first novel Al-Khibaa (The Tent) came out in 1996, followed by Al-Badhingana al-zarqa (Blue Aubergine) in 1998 and Naquarat al-Zibae (Gazelle Tracks) in 2008.

In 2007, al-Tahawy moved to the United States. She served as an assistant professor in the foreign languages department at Appalachian State University in North Carolina. She was also the coordinator of their Arabic programme. She is currently an associate professor at Arizona State University.

Al-Tahawy's most recent book, Brooklyn Heights, has met with considerable critical success. It won the 2010 Naguib Mahfouz Medal and was also nominated for the 2011 Arabic Booker Prize.

Her work has appeared in two issues of Banipal magazine (2002, 2007). She has also been translated into several languages including English, German, Italian, Spanish, Dutch, Danish, Norwegian, Urdu, and Hindi.

Al-Tahawy has a son. She also goes by the name of Miral Mahgoub.

== Works ==
- The Tent, translated by Anthony Calderbank
- Blue Aubergine, translated by Anthony Calderbank
- Gazelle Tracks, translated by Anthony Calderbank
- Brooklyn Heights, translated by Samah Selim
- The Bedouin Sheikh's Daughter
