= Adel Esmat =

Egyptian novelist

- Born: 1959 (age 66–67); Gharbia Governorate, Egypt
- Education: The American University in Cairo; University of Tanta
- Awards: State Encouragement Award (2011); Naguib Mahfouz Medal (2016)

Adel Esmat (Arabic: عادل عصمت, romanized: ʻĀdil ʻIṣmat; born 1959) is an Egyptian novelist. He published a collection of short stories named Fragments and nine novels including Days of the Blue Windows, published in 2009, which was awarded the State Prize for Incentive for Novels in 2011. Whereas, his novel Tales of Yusuf Tadrus, which was published in 2015, won the Naguib Mahfouz Medal for Literature in 2016 and later the American University of Cairo published an English translation of the novel.

== Education and career ==
Adel Esmat is a novelist who was born in Gharbia Governorate, Egypt in 1959. He obtained his bachelor's degree in Philosophy from the University of Ain Shams in 1984. Then, he had a second degree in Library Science from the University of Tanta in 1986. Now, he works as a library specialist in the Egyptian Ministry of Education. Esmat published his first novel Obsession of Death in 1995; and now he has published nine novels including Stable Life, The Naked Man, People and Places, and The Crow's Sound. In 2011, Esmat received the 2016 Naguib Mahfouz Medal for Literature by an award ceremony held at the American University of Cairo for his novel Tales of Yusuf Tadrus, which was translated into English. While his novel The Commandments was shortlisted for the International Prize for Arabic Fiction in 2019, and his novel The Days of the Blue Windows was awarded the 2011 State Prize for Incentive for the Novel. In 2015, he published his first collection of short stories entitled Fragments.

== Works ==
=== Novels ===
- Obsession of Death (Original title: Hages Al Mawt), 1995
- The Naked Man (Original title: Rajulun A’ari), 1998
- Stable Life (Original title: Hayat Mustaqera), 2004
- Days of the Blue Windows (Original title: Ayam Al-nawafath Al-zarqaa), 2009
- People and Places (Original title: Nass w Amaken), 2010
- The Tales of Yusuf Tadrus (Original title: Hikayat Yusuf Tadrus), 2015
- Reem’s Conditions (Original title: Halatu Reem), 2017
- The Crow’s Sound (Original title: Sawt Al Ghurab), 2017
- The Commandments (Original title: Al Wasaya), 2018

=== Short stories ===
- Fragments (Original title: Qasasat), 2015

== Awards and honors ==
- 2011: Won the State Encouragement Award for his novel The Days of the Blue Window
- 2016: Won the Naguib Mahfouz Medal for his novel Tales of Yusuf Tadrus and was translated into English
- 2019: His novel The Commandments won the Sawiris Award and was shortlisted for the International Prize for Arabic Fiction.
