= Ezzat el Kamhawi =

Egyptian novelist and journalist

Ezzat El Kamhawi
- عزت القمحاوي
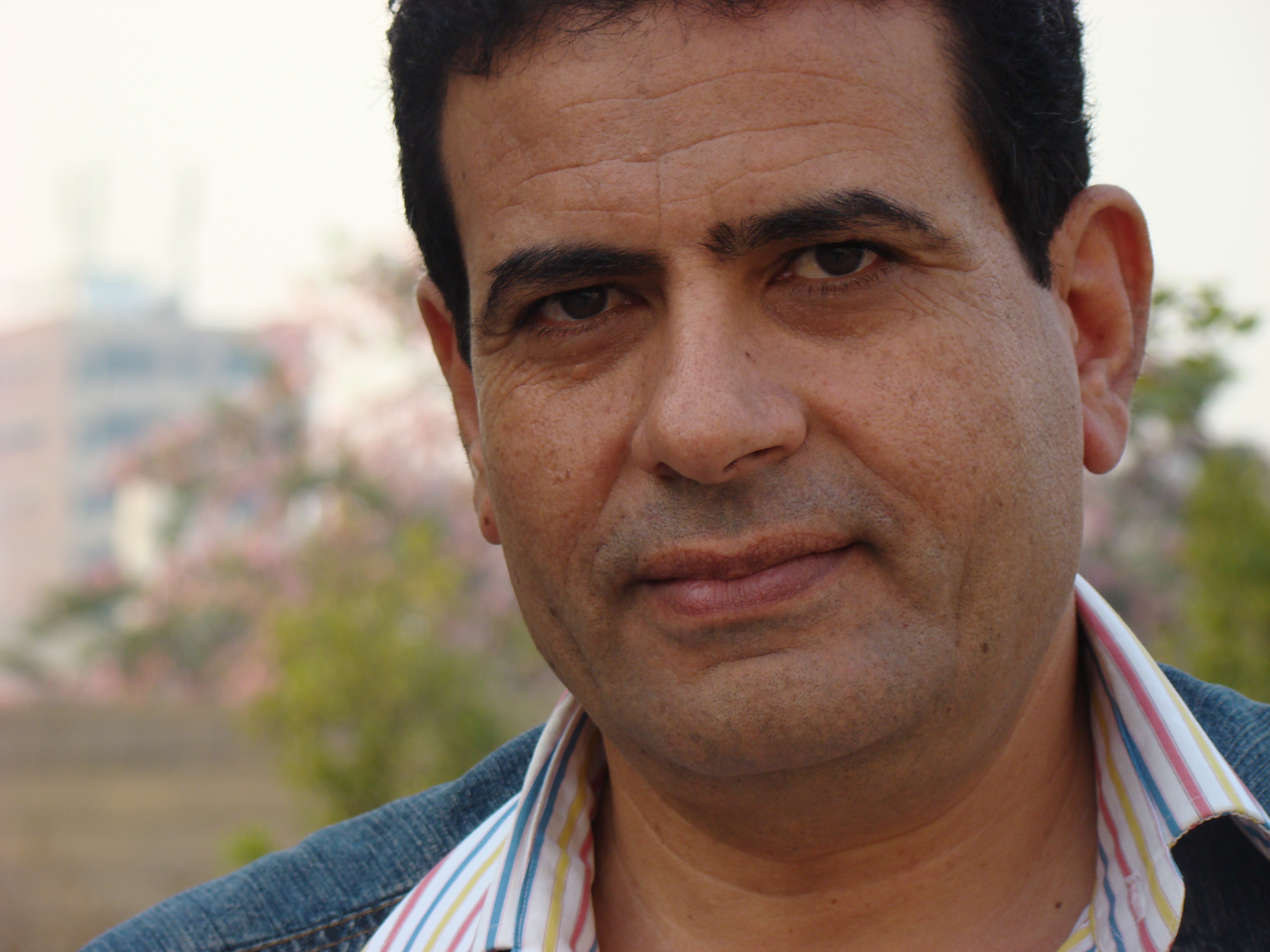
- Born: December 23, 1961 (age 64); Sharqia Governorate, Egypt
- Education: Cairo University
- Occupation: Novelist
- Writing career
- Language: Arabic
- Notable works: The City of Pleasure; A room overlooking the Nile; The Guard; House of the Wolf
- Notable awards: Naguib Mahfouz Medal for Literature; 2012 House of the Wolf; Samir Kassir Award for Freedom of the Press; 2022 Suspicious architecture: The obsession with grand buildings and wide streets
- Website: alayk.org

Ezzat El Kamhawi (Arabic: عزت القمحاوي) is an Egyptian novelist and journalist. In December 2012, El Kamhawi was awarded the Naguib Mahfouz Medal for Literature for his novel House of the Wolf. In June 2022 he was awarded the Samir Kassir Award for Freedom of the Press (Opinion Piece category) for his article "Suspicious architecture: The obsession with grand buildings and wide streets".

He was born in 1961 and graduated from the department of journalism in the Faculty of Mass Communications, Cairo University in 1983.

== Early life and career ==
El Kamhawi was born on 23 December 1961 in Sharqia Governorate, Egypt, before graduating from high school he had articles published for him in the Al Gomhuria newspaper.

After graduating from the department of journalism in the Faculty of Mass Communications, Cairo University, he started working for Al-Akhbar, where he helped establish Akhbar Al-Adab 10 years later, a widely known literature magazine. He was the Senior Editor of al-Doha Cultural Magazine from May 2011 until September 2013.

=== The City of Pleasure ===
A city like no other, guarded by the goddess of pleasure and, ruled by a licentious king who dedicated his time to carnal pleasures and a princess who dreams of love and tender empathy. The priests decide to design the walls of the princess's room with figures of embracing lovers and burnt incense and chanted their magical incantations that the pictures on the wall may come to life and the dream of the princess for true love might come true.

People from various social backgrounds, including laborers and leaders, have visited the City of Pleasure. Although the city was once difficult to access, it eventually later opened to outside trade. It has two ingenious commodities: fried potatoes and pepsi-cola. There are few historical records about the city, and visitors often choose to stay for long periods.

== Works ==
His published literary works include:

- It Happened in the land of Dust and Mud (Arabic: حدث في بلاد التراب والطين) (Stories) (published by Dar Soad Al Sabbah in 1992).
- The City of Pleasure (Arabic: مدينة اللذة) (Novel) (published by the General Organization for Cultural Centers in 1997 - second edition by "el-Ain publishing" in 2009).
- Times for Joy (Arabic: مواقيت البهجة) (Stories) (published by the General Organization for Cultural Centers in 2000).
- The Grove of Sadness and Bliss (Arabic: الأيك في المباهج والأحزان) (published by "Dar el-Hilal" in 2003).
- A room overlooking the Nile (Arabic: غرفة ترى النيل) (Novel) (published by "Merit Publishing House" in 2004 in Cairo, and "Dar Al Howar" in 2004 Latakia, Syria - second edition by "Merit Publishing House" in 2006 - third edition by "maktabet Al-a'osra" Arabic: مكتبة الأسرة in 2010).
- The Guard (Arabic: الحارس) (Novel) (published by "el-Ain publishing", Cairo 2008).
- Book seductiveness (published by "el-Ain publishing", Cairo 2009).
- House of the Wolf (Beit Al-Deeb, Arabic: بيت الدِّيب) (Published in Arabic by "Dar Al-Adab", Beirut 2010), (Published in English by AUC Press, Cairo 2013).
- Gold and Glass (Arabic: ذهب وزجاج) (Published by "Nahdet Misr", Cairo 2011).
- Shame from both sides (Arabic: العار من الضفتين) (Published by "el-Ain publishing", Cairo 2011).
- The sea behind the curtains (Arabic: البحر خلف الستائر) (Published by "Dar Al-Adab", Beirut 2013).
- The sky in an imminent way (Arabic: السماء على نحو وشيك) short stories (Published by "Batanna", Cairo 2016).
- At least we are together (Arabic: يكفي أننا معًا) (Published by the "Egyptian Lebanese House", Cairo 2017). Sheikh Zayed Book Award’s Short-list (2018).
- What Sami Jacoub saw (Arabic: ما رآه سامي يعقوب) (Published by the "Egyptian Lebanese House", Cairo 2019).
- The Passengers Hall (Arabic: غرفة المسافرين) (Published by the "Egyptian Lebanese House", Cairo 2020).
- Strangers at Home (Arabic: غربة المنازل) (Published by the "Egyptian Lebanese House", Cairo 2021).
- The Grove of Sadness and Bliss (Arabic: الأيك في المباهج والأحزان) - extended edition - (Published by the "Egyptian Lebanese House", Cairo 2022).

== Recognition ==
- 2012: Naguib Mahfouz Medal for Literature for his novel House of the Wolf.
- 2018: At least we are together (Arabic: يكفي أننا معًا) reaches the 2018 short-list of Sheikh Zayed Book Award.
- 2021: The Passengers Hall (Arabic: غرفة المسافرين) reaches the 2021 short-list of Sheikh Zayed Book Award.
- 2022: Strangers at Home (Arabic: غربة المنازل) reaches the 2022 short-list of Sheikh Zayed Book Award.
- 2022: Samir Kassir Award for Freedom of the Press (Opinion Piece category) for his article "Suspicious architecture: The obsession with grand buildings and wide streets".
