= Hassan Daoud =

Lebanese writer and journalist

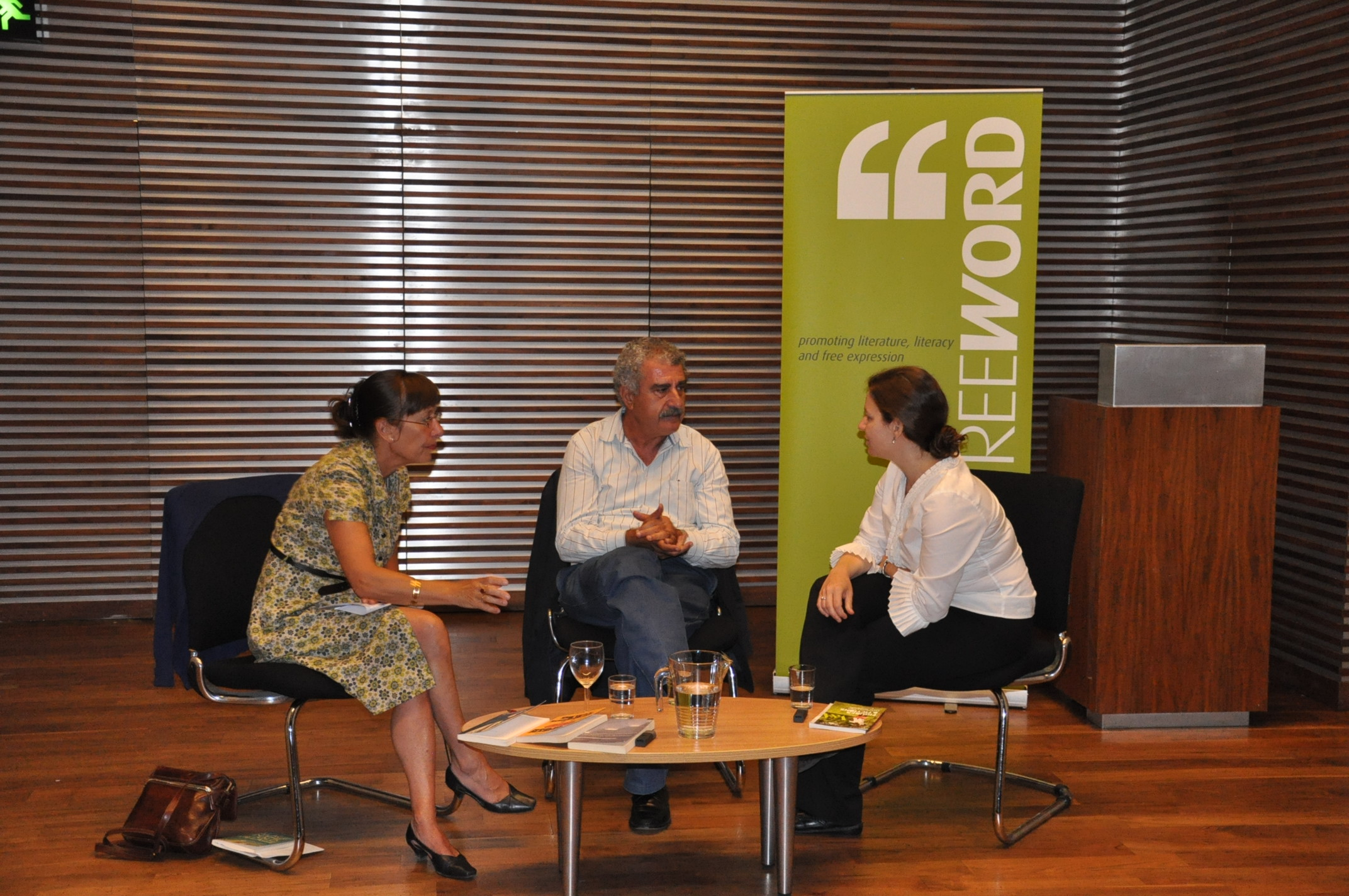
Daoud (centre), July 2011 London

Hassan Daoud (Arabic: حسن داوود, romanized: Ḥasan Dāwūd; born 1950) is a Lebanese writer and journalist. Originally from the village of Noumairieh in southern Lebanon, he moved to Beirut as a child with his family. He studied Arabic literature at university. He has been a journalist since the Lebanese civil war that broke out in 1975. He served as a correspondent for al-Hayat for 11 years. As of 2012 he edited Nawafez, the cultural supplement of the Beiruti newspaper al-Mustaqbal.

Daoud has published eight novels and two volumes of short stories. As of 2011, five of the novels have been translated into English. Daoud has also been translated into French and German (by Hartmut Faehndrich). His work has appeared in Banipal magazine.

== Awards and honors ==
- 2015 Naguib Mahfouz Medal for Literature winner for No Road to Paradise

== Works ==
- The Year of the Revolutionary New Bread-Making Machine (translated by Randa Jarrar)
- Borrowed Time (translated by Michael K Scott)
- The House of Mathilde (translated by Peter Theroux)
- 180 Sunsets (longlisted for the Arabic Booker Prize in 2010)
- The Penguin's Song (translated by Marilyn Booth)
- No Road to Paradise (translated by Marilyn Booth)
