= Khufu's Wisdom =

1939 book by Nagieb Mahfoez

- Author: Naguib Mahfouz
- Translator: Raymond Stock
- Language: Arabic
- Genre: Fiction, historical fiction
- Publication date: 1939
- Publication place: Egypt
- English publication date: 2003

Khufu's Wisdom (Arabic: حكمة خوفو, romanized: Hikmat Khufu) is the first novel by the Egyptian writer Naguib Mahfouz. It was originally published in 1939 in Arabic by Salama Moussa, who renamed it 'Abath al-Aqdar (Arabic: عبث الأقدار, lit. 'The Absurdity of Fate'), as a separate issue of the magazine Al Majalla Al Jadida.

It is Mahfouz's first novel and the first of what would later be referred to as his pharaonic trilogy, which also includes Rhadopis and Thebes at War.

== History ==
After beginning his literary career in the mid-1930s writing short stories published in Arrissalah, Mahfouz made his foray into writing novels in 1939 with 'Abath al-Aqdar. It is one of several novels that Mahfouz wrote at the beginning of his career with Pharaonic Egypt as the setting, employing what would become his signature historical realism. Rhadopis of Nubia (1943) and Thebes at War (1944) completed Mahfouz's pharaonic trilogy.

== Translations ==
An English translation by Raymond Stock was published under the title Khufu's Wisdom in 2003. The complete pharaonic trilogy was published in English in one volume under the title Three Novels of Ancient Egypt (Everyman's Library, 2007).
