= Before We Say Goodbye =

2004 novel by Gabriella Ambrosio

- Author: Gabriella Ambrosio
- Original title: Prima di Lasciarsi
- Language: English
- Publisher: Nutrimenti, Walker Books
- Publication date: 2004
- English publication date: 2010
- Media type: Print
- Pages: 160 pages
- ISBN: 140632504X

Before We Say Goodbye, first published as Prima di Lasciarsi, is a 2004 novel by Gabriella Ambrosio. The work is based on the 2002 Kiryat HaYovel supermarket bombing and narrates the final hours in the lives of the suicide bomber and her victims. It was first published in Italy in 2004 through Nutrimenti, and was later published in English on 2 August 2010 through Walker Books. The novel has been published in multiple languages, including Arabic and Hebrew, and has been endorsed in some countries by Amnesty International.

Ambrosio states that she was inspired to write the work after reading newspaper articles about the bombing and noticing that some of them focused on two sisters that had been killed. Actually there was such an astounding resemblance between Ayat al-Akhras and her victim, Rachel Levy, that the Israeli media, in the first hours after the bombing, spread the news that the suicide bombers were two sisters.

Ambrosio went to Israel and Occupied Territories to interview families and friends of the two young girls before writing the novel.

== Synopsis ==
The book follows Ayat al-Akhras, a seventeen-year-old female suicide bomber that has been sent to a supermarket in Kiryat HaYovel on the even of Passover to kill as many people as possible. It also follows Haim Smadar, a security guard that notices her actions and tries to stop her, losing his life in the process but saving the lives of multiple people. The story begins at seven o'clock in the morning on the day of the attack and ends with the explosion. Despite the very short time span – seven hours – seen from the points of view of the different characters, the book tries to portray the complex reality between Israel and Palestine.

== Reception ==
The Herald Scotland gave a mostly positive review for Before We Say Goodbye, writing that it was "an imaginatively constructed work" and that it had excellent atmosphere but that the "weakness of the story is the sense that Ambrosio is sometimes trying to fit the entire Israeli/Palestinian conflict into this short book, making a series of brief references to, for instance, the keys of the Nakba, with the most fleeting of context. This slightly muddles the otherwise uncluttered narrative." Malta Today also praised the work, favorably comparing it to a work by J.M.G. Le Clezio. Reading Time also favorably reviewed the work, writing "Young readers are likely to be affected by this unhappy story, but it is probably necessary for all of us, teenagers included, to weep for what is happening before it can be changed."

It is studied as an example of human rights literature in universities in UK and Canada.
