= Hamzah Al-Mozainy =

Hamza bin Qablan Al-Muzaini (Arabic: حمزة المزيني; born 1944) is a contemporary Saudi linguistics professor, critic, and translator. He has been serving as a board member of the Saudi Literature, Publishing and Translation Commission since July 2020. Al-Muzaini has gained recognition for translating several works of the renowned American linguist and philosopher Noam Chomsky into Arabic. His contributions to the field of translation were honored when he received the King Abdullah bin Abdulaziz International Award for Translation in its tenth edition in 2022.

== Career ==
Hamza bin Qablan Al-Muzaini is a Saudi linguistics professor and translator with a PhD from the University of Texas at Austin. He is a professor at King Saud University in Riyadh and writes for the Al Watan (Saudi Arabia) newspaper. Al-Muzaini is recognized for his critiques of educational curricula and traditionalist views, as well as his translations of works by American linguist Noam Chomsky into Arabic.

== Awards ==
Hamza bin Qablan Al-Muzaini was awarded the King Abdullah bin Abdulaziz International Award for Translation in its tenth edition in 2022. He received the award in the category of "Translation Efforts by Individuals."
