= George Zinati =

Palestinian-Lebanese academic, researcher, and translator (1935–2021)

- Born: 1935 (age 90–91); Haifa, British Palestine
- Died: 22 January 2021 (aged 85–86); Beirut, Lebanon
- Education: University of Paris
- Occupations: Writer, academic, researcher, translator
- Writing career
- Language: Arabic, French, English, Italian
- Years active: 1964–2020
- Notable awards: Sheikh Zayed Book Award in 2007 in the translation category King Abdullah bin Abdulaziz International Award for Translation in 2011

George Zenati or Georges Zenati (Arabic: جورج زيناتي; born in 1935) was a Palestinian-Lebanese academic, researcher and translator. He presented a number of philosophical and intellectual works that discussed various topics, in addition to making several translations, perhaps the most important of which are the works of the French thinker Paul Ricoeur, he died on 22 January 2020.

== Biography ==
George was born in Haifa, from which he was displaced with his family in 1948 to Beirut, where he spent his youthful years, before moving in the late sixties to Paris, to continue his studies, where he obtained a doctorate at the University of Paris in 1972, under the supervision of Paul Ricoeur, then worked as a teacher at the National University of Zaire of Lubumbashi in Congo between 1973 and 1977, before returning to Beirut to work as a professor of modern and contemporary philosophy and graduate studies, in the faculties of education and literature at the Lebanese University.

== Awards ==
His book "The Same Same as Another" (translated from French into Arabic) won the Sheikh Zayed Book Award in 2007, in the translation category. He also received the King Abdullah bin Abdulaziz International Award for Translation in 2011, in the field of "Humanities from Other Languages into Arabic", for his translation of the book "Memory, History, Oblivion" from the French language, the prize is shared equally with Muhammad Badawi, for his translation of the book "The Interpretation of Cultures" from the English language, by Clifford Geertz.

== Published works ==
- 1964: الظمأ الأبدي, Eternal Thirst, Commercial Office for Printing, Distribution and Publishing
- 1993: رحلات داخل الفلسفة الغربية, Journeys into Western Philosophy, University Foundation for Studies, Publishing and Distribution, ISBN 6144780297
- 2002: الفلسفة في مسارها, Philosophy on its way, conditions and times for printing, publishing and distribution, ISBN 9789959296115
- 2018: الحرية والعنف, Freedom and Violence, The Arab Center for Research and Policy Studies, ISBN 6144452036
- 2019: فلسفة ابن باجة وأثرها, The Philosophy and Impact of Ibn Bajja, The Arab Center for Research and Policy Studies, ISBN 614445263X

=== Translations ===
- 1993: انفعالات النَّفس, "The Passions of the Soul", by René Descartes
- 2005: الذات عينها كآخر, "The Self Same as Other", by Paul Ricoeur
- 2008: تاريخ الكثلكة, "History of Catholicism", by Yves Broglie
- 2008: تاريخ بيزنطة, "History of Byzantium", Jean-Claude Chenet
- 2009: "الذاكرة، "التاريخ، النسيان", “Memory," “History, Oblivion," by Paul Ricoeur
- 2009: الفلسفة الأخلاقية, "Moral Philosophy", by Monique Canto-Sperber and Reuven Ojian
- 2020: ابن رشد المقلق, "Ibn Rushd the Disquieting", Jean-Baptiste Brunet
