= Biancamaria Scarcia Amoretti =

Italian Islamic studies scholar

- Born: 26 November 1938; Aosta, Italy
- Died: 19 September 2020 (aged 81); Rome, Italy

Academic background
- Education: University of Naples - L'Orientale
- Thesis: Hagiography, Popular Devotion, and Pilgrimages Dedicated to the Eighth Imam, ʿAlī al-Riḍā

Academic work
- Discipline: Islamic studies
- Institutions: Sapienza University of Rome
- Main interests: history of medieval Islam

Biancamaria Scarcia Amoretti (26 November 1938, in Aosta – 19 September 2020, in Rome) was an Italian researcher and Islamologist. She specialized in the history of medieval Islam, particularly in the relations between religion and politics. The scholar was also interested in Shia Islam and issues related to female expressiveness and representation in this history.

== Biography ==
Biancamaria Amoretti was born on 26 November 1938, in Aosta. She earned her doctorate in 1963 from the University of Naples - L'Orientale with a dissertation titled Hagiography, Popular Devotion, and Pilgrimages Dedicated to the Eighth Imam, ʿAlī al-Riḍā. Her thesis director was Laura Veccia Vaglieri.

After completing her university studies, she began teaching at the Sapienza University of Rome in 1967 as an assistant. In 1971, she was promoted to adjunct professor, and in 1976, she received tenure. Finally, in 1985, Amoretti was appointed to the chair of Islamology at the university. Her primary research interests were the history of medieval Islam, particularly the relationships between religion and politics.

She was also interested in Shia Islam and issues related to female expressiveness and representation in this history. Throughout her research and travels, the historian described herself as a feminist and wrote about the condition of women in the Muslim world. She contributed to the feminist journal DWF from its inception in 1976.

In the 1980s and 1990s, Amoretti frequently traveled to Iran for her research.

She married Gianroberto Scarcia, one of her fellow Islamologists. Starting in 1992, Amoretti served as a juror for the Pozzale Luigi Russo Prize. In 1998, she organized the first international meeting of scholars on the theme of the ashraf and wrote a significant portion of the scientific outputs for the conference.

She died in Rome on 19 September 2020.

== Legacy ==
The Iranian Cultural Institute in Italy quickly organized a webinar on 29 September 2020, in her honor. The journal DWF paid tribute to her. In 2023, the University of Trieste held a conference in her memory titled "Study days in memory of Biancamaria Scarcia Amoretti: the role of women in the Muslim world and Palestine".
