= History of King Saud University =

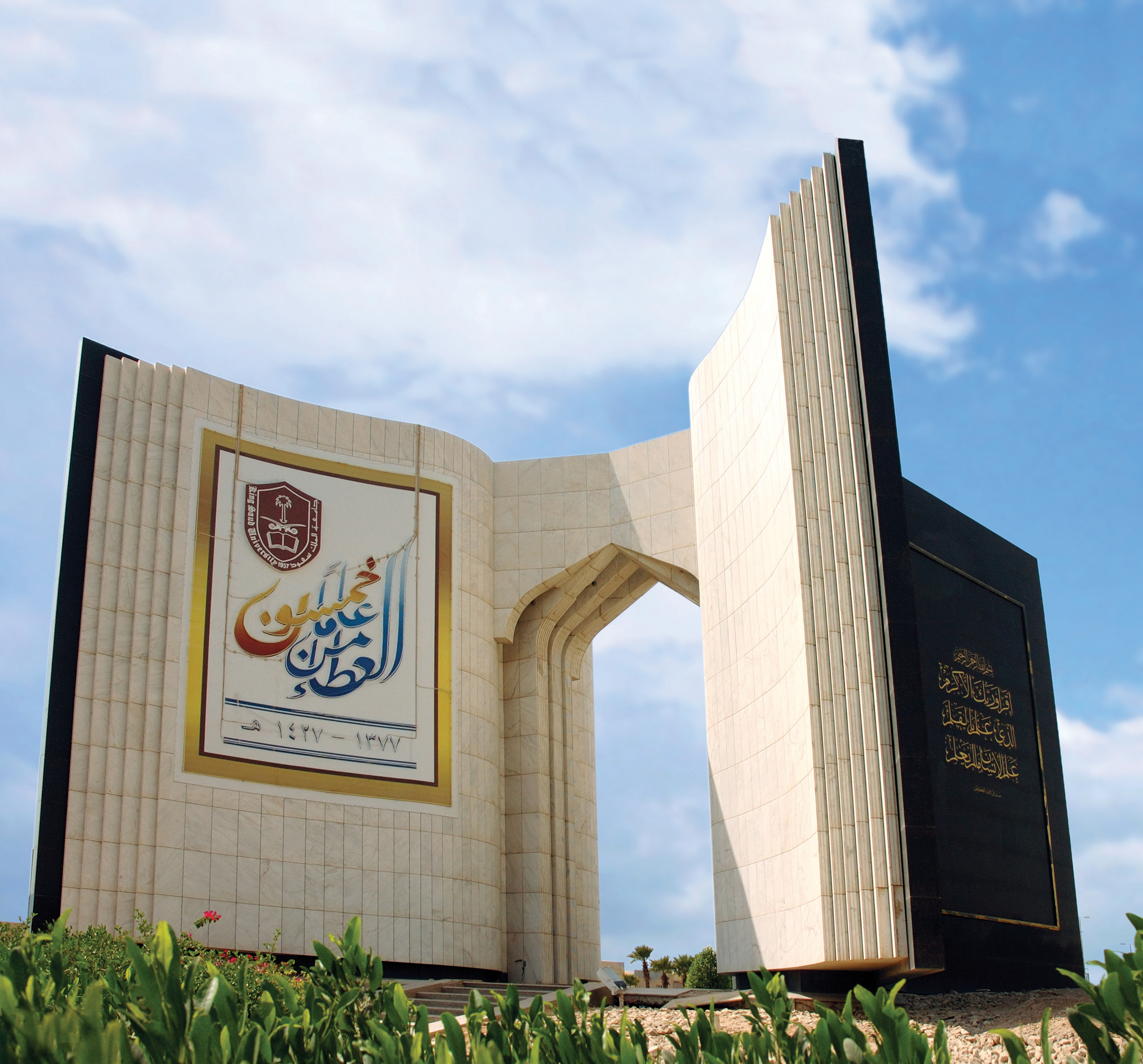
King Saud University Entrance Gate by Basil Al Bayati

King Saud University (KSU), founded in 1957, was the first university established in the history of Saudi Arabia. It was founded by King Saud bin Abdulaziz. The institute was renamed as Riyadh University by King Faisal bin Abdulalziz in 1964 but was reversed back to its original name in 1982 by King Khalid bin Abdulalziz. The university initially offered courses in arts, followed by science, business and pharmacy in 1960. By 1965, agriculture and engineering disciplines were also incorporated into the curriculum. The university was converted into an independent non-profit academic institution in 2023 by Crown Prince Mohammed bin Salman.

== Establishment ==
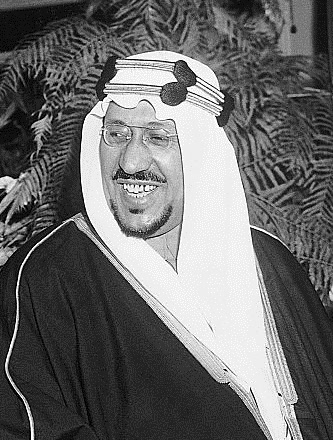
King Saud

Royal Decree no. 112 of 1961 recognized that: King Saud University is an independent legal character, with a budget of its own, responsible for higher education, promoting scholarly research, and advancement of sciences and arts in the country. Naming the Minister of Education as the president of the university, the Statute ordered that the university have a vice president and secretary general, and that each college and institute have a dean, vice dean, and a council.

== Riyadh University ==
Royal Decree no M/11 of 1967 enforced the Statute of the University of Riyadh (currently King Saud University), rescinding all earlier statutes, bylaws, and regulations. Of the main landmarks of the new Statute is the creation of the Higher Council of the university as one of its administrative powers. The membership of the new council includes two active or inactive university presidents, two faculty members who had assumed such positions outside the country, or two native leading intellectuals.

The Higher Council of the university is the dominant power over the university affairs: it draws out policies, issues decisions to implement and achieve the objectives of the university (especially those pertaining to the creation of new colleges and departments), proposes budgets, and systems of faculty salaries, annuities, and financial awards.

Royal Decree no M/6 of 1972 superseded the Statute of 1967. With the new Statute, the membership of the Higher Council of the university includes five active or inactive university presidents, or native leading intellectuals. To the council are also added the University Secretary General and two other non-university members. Again, the Statute dictates the creation of an Academic Council overlooking scholarly research and studies. The Higher Council of the university issues the bylaws governing the number of the Academic Council's members, responsibilities, and powers.

These decrees were issued in response to the growing and widening needs of the university as the establishment of new colleges started. Between 1958 and 1960, three colleges were established: the College of Sciences, College of Business (now the College of Public Administration) and the College of Pharmacy. In 1961/1962 women were first admitted into the College of Arts and the College of Public Administration.

Five years later the College of Agriculture was established. In the same year the College of Engineering and College of Education, having been under the Ministry of Education in cooperation with the UNESCO, were annexed to the university. A year later (1969/1970) the College of Medicine opened. In 1974/1975 the Arabic Language Institute was inaugurated to serve non-Arabic speakers. At this time deanships of Admission and Registration, Students Affairs, Libraries were also established. Again, a year later (1976) the College of Dentistry and the College of Applied Medical Sciences were added to the Riyadh campus, while launching at the same time the Abha-based campus with the College of Education. In 1977 the Graduate College assumed its office in supervising and organizing all graduate programs in the various departments of the university.

At Abha, the College of Medicine was established according to Royal Order no. 3/M/380 of 1979 and was added to the university according to Royal Directive no. 15128 of 29/6/1400H. Formal study there started in the academic year of 1980/1981.

In 1980, another branch of the university opened at Qassim with three colleges: Agriculture, Veterinary Medicine, and Economics and Administration. Formal study started in 1980/1981 academic year.

== King Saud University ==
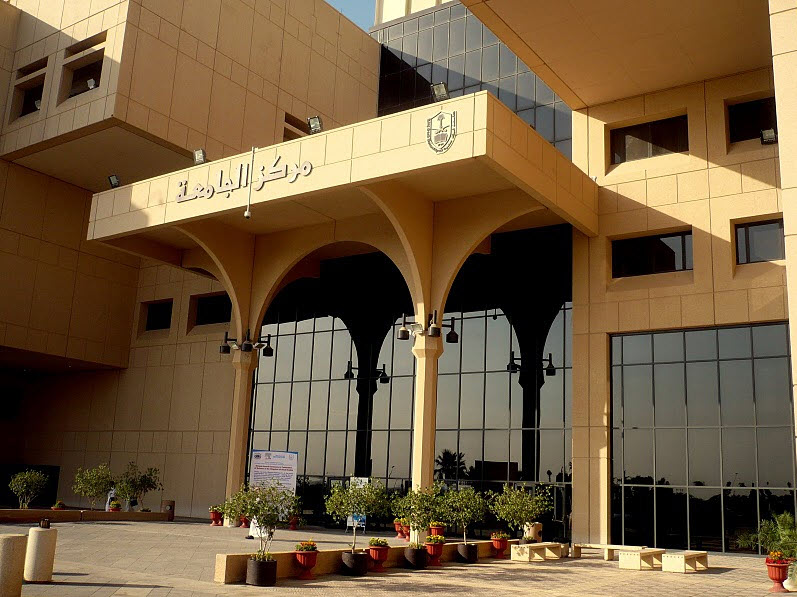
King Saud University entrance

In 1981, celebrating its 25th anniversary, the University of Riyadh went back to its original name of King Saud University at the orders of King Khalid bin Abdulaziz. In that year, too, the Deanship of Community Service and Continuing Education replaced the Center for Community Service, and King Khalid University Hospital (KKUH) was formally opened.

Two years later (1983) two other colleges were created: the College of Computer and Information Science Sciences and the College of Architecture and Planning. Later, in 1990, the Institute of Languages and Translation was established to be turned four years later into the full-fledged College of Languages and Translation.

In 1993, the Royal ratification of the System of the Council of Higher Education and Universities was issued dictating that each university form its own Council which attends to its academic, administrative, and financial affairs, and carries out its general policy.

In 1996, the Council of Higher Education issued its decision no. 1282/A approving the creation of the Center for Consulting and Research which was renamed King Abdullah Center for Consulting and Research.

In 1997, Royal Decree no. 33 dictated the creation of a King Saud University Community College in Jazan, as well as the establishment of the College of Sciences at the Qassim campus.

In 1998, Royal Order no. 7/78/M of 11/3/1419 decreed that King Khalid University be created in the south. The branches of Imam University and of King Saud University consequently formed the new university. In the same year, after the issuance of the unified regulations for Graduate Studies at Saudi universities, the Graduate College became the Deanship of Graduate Studies, and the Deanship of Academic Research was established in accordance with the dictates of the System of Academic Research issued that year.

In 2000, the College of Medicine was established at the Qassim campus, and the Deanship of Community Service and Continuing Education was turned into the College of Applied Studies and Community Service.

In 2001, the Community College in Riyadh was inaugurated according to the Cabinet Council no. 73. During the academic year of 2002/2003 the College of Science at Al-Jouf was established. That same year the College of Engineering was opened at the Qassim campus, and the creation of community colleges at Al-Majma’ah, Al-Aflaj, and Al-Qurayat was approved.

Beginning with the academic year 2003/2004 Qassim campus became an independent university. In 2003, the Council of Higher Education approved the promotion of the Department of Nursing, College of Applied Medical Sciences, into the College of Nursing.

== Former presidents ==
The following have been the presidents of the university since its inception:

president	From	Up To
Dr. Abdulwahab bin Mohammed Azam	1957	1959
Sheikh Nasser Al-manqour	1959	1960
Abdulaziz bin Muhammad Al-Khwaiter	1961	1971
Abdulaziz bin Abdullah Al-Fadda	1971	1979
Mansour bin Ibrahim Al-Turki	1979	1990
Ahmad bin Muhammad Al-Dhubaib	1990	1995
Abdullah bin Muhammad Al-Faisal	1995	2007
Dr. Abdullah Al-Othman	2007	2012
Dr. Badran Al-Omar	2012	now

== See also ==
- List of universities in Saudi Arabia
