= Sufficiency Ceiling =

2002 novel by Muhammad Hassan Alwan

- Author: Muhammad Hassan Alwan
- Language: Arabic
- Genre: Novel
- Published: 2002
- Publisher: Dar Al-Farabi, Dar Al-Saqi
- Publication place: Saudi Arabia
- Pages: 464
- OCLC: 1062291780
- Website: https://www.worldcat.org/title/saqf-al-kifayah-riwayah/oclc/1062291780&referer=brief_results

Sufficiency Ceiling (Arabic: سقف الكفاية) is an Arabic novel by the Saudi novelist Muhammad Hassan Alwan, which was published in its first edition by Dar Al-Farabi, Beirut, in 2002, and the second in 2004, before moving to Dar Al-Saqi, from which the third to sixth editions were issued. The novel sparked a local controversy when it was published due to the young age of the novelist, the sensitivity of the novel's content, and its difference at the level of language.

Many senior Saudi writers and critics criticized it, such as: Dr. Ghazi Al-Qusaibi, Dr. Abdullah Al-Ghadami, Dr. Mujeeb Al-Zahrani, critic Muhammad Al-Abbas, and others.

== The story of the novel ==
The novel deals with an intimate love story in Riyadh, the capital of Saudi Arabia, between Nasser and Maha, and the tragic effects after the end of this love, and then Nasser's travel to Vancouver, Canada, and his meeting with the Iraqi immigrant Diyar, who is trying to rid him of the emotional impurities of this painful love. After Nasser moved to Canada, he tried in various ways to get rid of Maha's memory and its effects on himself, but to no avail. He had forgotten his homeland, his writings, and his mother, trying to combine his pain so that he would not feel the pain of losing Maha, but it was useless. His love and loss for her was his greatest pain.

== They said about the novel ==
“This young novelist was able to turn an ordinary love story into a complete epic, and writing epics is not an easy thing, nor is it something that is repeated every day. good tidings to you! Today, a talented novelist named Muhammad Hassan Alwan is born, remember this name, before he imposed himself on you.” - Dr. Ghazi Al-Gosaibi, Al-Khaleej speaks poetry and prose

“In sufficiency ceiling, Qais and his Laila are present in a modern and innovative form, and if Qais was to write a prose text for Laila, he would have sought the help of Muhammad Hassan Alwan to write this text for him. This is because he possessed the reins of the language, probed its secrets and dived into its expressive values, and this is evidence of his discovery of the language game and his playing with it to the fullest extent.”Dr. Abdullah Al-Ghadami

“I used to read with a pencil in my hand with which I knew the pages that contained distinct phrases or paragraphs in terms of the aesthetics of style, the depth of the idea, the dimension of the vision, and the breadth of its horizons. And so, as soon as I finished reading, I found most of the pages marked with the effects of my astonishment, which exceeded all my expectations". Dr. Mujeeb Al-Zahrani, Al-Riyadh Saudi newspaper, issue 12424.

“Let there be an affirmation, followed by an affirmation, then an affirmation: that Muhammad Hassan Alwan is a different narrator, who, with his virgin work, created sufficiency ceiling, this violent tremor because he is (in the beginning) a true poet, otherwise, what are the many storytellers and hallucinators these days.” Dr. Fatima Al-Qarni, Al Yamamah Saudi Magazine, Issue 7 September 2002.

“sufficiency ceiling is about to be a purely poetic text with its general structural structure and detailed linguistic style. That is, it is not related to the many poetic evidence, rhymed and activating, not only, nor to the narrative discourse and the style of linguistic and artistic performance, but it goes beyond this and that to the overall structure of the text and every word in its details.” Dr. Abdullah Al-Fifi, Al-Jazirah Saudi newspaper, No. 10 October 2002.

"Establishes a New Narrative Shift in the World of Novel in Saudi Arabia", Abdullah Al-Samti, Al-Faisal Magazine, December 2002.

“The novel, despite its four hundred pages, was read by a lot, and a lot was written about it as well, and it proved that we read in the event that there is something that challenges the obsolete, repetitive and boring.” Omaima Al-Khamis, Al-Jazirah newspaper, March 13, 2003.

“Should I say that I discovered by chance, and according to the outpouring of surprise, an amazing novelist as soon as I read his first novel?” Saadiya Mufreh, Al-Riyadh Saudi newspaper, June 26, 2003.

“Alwan’s language brings a narrative as a structural component and not just a verbal shell,” Muhammad Al-Abbas, Al-Riyadh Saudi newspaper, issue 13019.

“The Ceiling of Enough” was truly wonderful, as beautiful as the lack of novel writers in our benevolent homeland, distinguished by the ability of its writer and the splendor of his style" Turky Al-Turky, Al-Jazirah newspaper, March 2, 2003.

== See also ==
- Mohammed Hasan Alwan
