= To Die in Jerusalem =

- Directed by: Hilla Medalia
- Written by: Hilla Medalia
- Produced by: Hilla Medalia; Ed Priddy; John Priddy
- Edited by: Geof Bartz; Shlomi Shalom
- Music by: Issar Shulman
- Release date: 2007
- Running time: 75 minutes
- Country: Israel
- Languages: English, Hebrew, Arabic

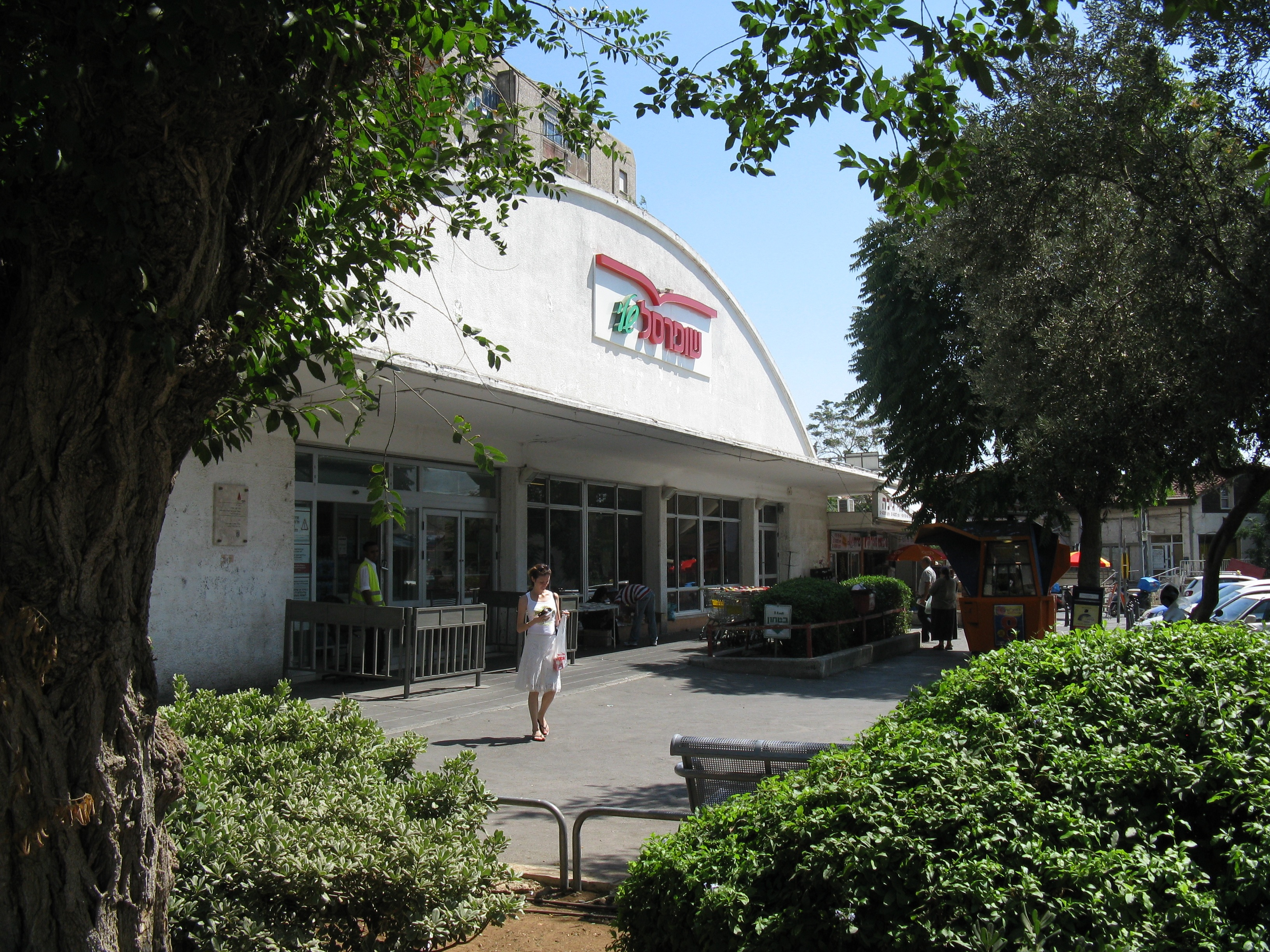
The entrance to the Kiryat HaYovel supermarket, where Akhras detonated the bomb and killed 2.

To Die in Jerusalem is a 2007 HBO documentary film about the effects of a March 29, 2002, Jerusalem suicide bombing on the families of the 17-year-old Israeli victim Rachel Levy and the 18-year-old Palestinian female suicide bomber, Ayat al-Akhras. Al-Akhras blew herself up at the entrance of Kiryat HaYovel's main supermarket, killing two people and injuring 28.

== Awards ==
"To Die in Jerusalem" garnered HBO Documentary Films, in association with Priddy Brothers, a Peabody Award in 2007.
