= Gabriella Ambrosio =

Italian writer and academic (born 1954)

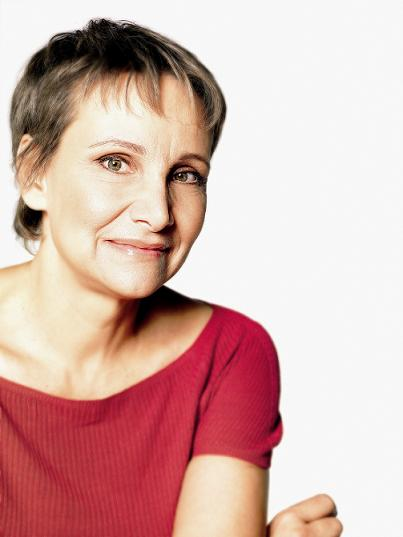
- Ambrosio in 2008
- Born: November 1954 (age 71); Italy
- Education: University of Naples
- Occupations: Italian writer, journalist, academic, and advertising creative director
- Writing career
- Language: Italian
- Notable works: Prima di Lasciarsi (novel, 2004); "Siamo Quel che Diciamo" ("We Are What We Say") (non-fiction); "Le Nuove Terre della Pubblicita" ("The New Advertising Lands") (non-fiction)
- Notable awards: Short story Sticko nominated for the 2015 Pushcart Prize in US by The Atlas Review Novel Prima di lasciarsi awarded at the Festival du Premier Romance in Chambéry, France.

Gabriella Ambrosio (born November 1954) is an Italian writer, journalist, academic, and advertising creative director. Her essays Siamo Quel che Diciamo ("We are what we say") and Le Nuove Terre della Pubblicita ("The New Advertising Land") are required advertising texts in several universities in Italy. Her first novel, Prima di Lasciarsi ("Before We Say Goodbye"), related to a suicide bombing in Jerusalem, has been translated into several languages including Hebrew and Arabic.

== Education and early career ==
She graduated with a degree in philosophy from the University of Naples, and became a journalist and a copywriter.

== Career ==
In 1992 she co-founded the advertising agency AM, now YesIAm, which has received international awards for its creative output. She was also a communications professor at La Sapienza University in Rome, and is a member of the Italian Art Directors Club, the association of Italian advertising professionals.

== The novel ==
Prima di Lasciarsi (Before We Say Goodbye), her first novel, is based on the true story of the Kiryat HaYovel supermarket bombing in Jerusalem, committed by Ayat al-Akhras, a seventeen-year-old Palestinian girl from the Dheisheh refugee camp. The book narrates the final hours in the lives of the bomber and her victims – a seventeen-year-old girl from Jerusalem and the security guard whose intervention saved the lives of the rest of the people at the busy market on that Passover Eve. The story begins at seven o'clock in the morning on the day of the attack and ends with the horrifying explosion. Despite the very short time span – seven hours – seen from the points of view of the different characters, the book tries to portray the complex reality between Israel and Palestine.

The book was published in Italy in 2004 by Nutrimenti Publishers and was awarded at the Festival du Premier Romance in Chambéry, France. In 2008 the book's publication in both Arabic and Hebrew was sponsored by Amnesty International and employed by Israeli colleges and human rights organizations working in Israel and the Palestinian Territories as an educational tool.

It has been published in the UK, Australia, and in New Zealand by Walker Books, in France as Deuze Heures Avant ("12 Hours before") (Gallimard), by Fischer Verlag in Germany as Der Himmel uber Jerusalem ("The sky above Jerusalem"), as well as in Spain, Turkey, Greece, South Korea and China.

It is studied as an example of Human rights literature in universities in UK and Canada.

== Other works of fiction ==
Her short story Sticko was published in 2009 in the book Freedom, an anthology of thirty-six short stories written by some of the leading fiction writers in the world, each inspired by an article of the Universal Declaration of Human Rights, and subsequently published in Canada, the US, Spain, Italy, Turkey, and Poland.

"Sticko" is about freedom from torture and echoes the events in Genoa, Italy, during G8 summit in 2001. It was nominated for the 2015 Pushcart Prize in the US by The Atlas Review.

Il garbuglio di Garlasco, published in 2022 in Italy, retraces the story of Alberto Stasi, convicted for the murder of his girlfriend Chiara Poggi, which took place when he was 23 and she was 26. The book is based on a study of court documents and interviews with the protagonists, both known and unknown, of the affair. In 2025, this court case was reopened precisely on the basis of the elements described in the novel, which was therefore described by the press as “a prophecy book”.

The novel Tu che conosci gli uomini narrates the love between a teenager in search of his sexual identity and a young prostitute.

The novel Aprile è una strana stagione is the fictionalized biography of an Italian filmmaker born in 1938, who moves across three different continents in a dual sexual identity, in an extraordinary yet banal existence.

== Published work ==
=== Non-fiction ===
- "Siamo Quel che Diciamo" ("We Are What We Say") ISBN 88-8353-536-7
- "Le Nuove Terre della Pubblicita" ("The New Advertising Lands") ISBN 88-8353-408-5

=== Fiction ===
- Prima di Lasciarsi 2004
- לפני הפרידה, Pardes, 2008
- Prima di Lasciarsi, in Arabic, 2008
- Before We Say Goodbye, 2010
- Douze heures avant, Gallimard (France), 2011
- Der Himmel uber Jerusalem, Fischer (Germany), 2012
- Antes de despedirnos, Planeta, Spain, 2011
- Ayrılmadan Önce, Kemzi Kitabevi, Turkey, 2011
- Prima di Lasciarsi, Psichogios, Greece, 2012
- 안녕이라고 말하기 전에, Joongang Books, Korea, 2012
- 哭泣的耶路撒冷 Jieli Publishing House, China. BSY310
- Freedom, 2009
- Il garbuglio di Garlasco, Rubbettino 2022. ISBN 978-88-498-7098-5
- Tu che conosci gli uomini, Affiori Giulio Perrone 2024. ISBN 979-12-5579-106-5
- Aprile è una strana stagione. Gramma Feltrinelli. 2026. ISBN 979-12-5624-083-8.
