= Oliver Leaman =

American philosopher and professor (born 1950)

Oliver Leaman (born 1950) is an American professor of philosophy and Zantker Professor of Judaic studies at the University of Kentucky, where he has been teaching since 2000. He specialized in the history of Islamic, Jewish, and Eastern philosophy. He received his Ph.D. from the University of Cambridge in 1979.

== Books ==
- An Introduction to Medieval Islamic Philosophy, Cambridge University Press, 1985.
- Moses Maimonides, Routledge, 1990.
- Death and Loss: Compassionate Attitudes in the Classroom, Cassell, 1995.
- Evil and Suffering in Jewish Philosophy, Cambridge University Press, 1995
- History of Islamic Philosophy, ed. S. H. Nasr & O. Leaman, Routledge, 1996
- Friendship East and West – Philosophical Perspectives, ed. O. Leaman, Curzon, 1996.
- History of Jewish Philosophy, ed. D. Frank & O. Leaman, Routledge, 1996.
- Moses Maimonides Curzon, 1997, 2nd Edition ("The Assault on the kalam" reprinted in Classical and Medieval Literature Criticism, vo. 76, ed. J. Krstovic, Gale Group
- Averroes and his Philosophy Curzon, 1997, 2nd Edition
- The Future of Philosophy: Towards the 21st Century, ed. O. Leaman (Routledge, 1998).
- Key Concepts in Eastern Philosophy, Routledge, 1999.
- A Brief Introduction to Islamic Philosophy, Polity Press, 1999.
- Eastern Philosophy: Key Readings, London, Routledge, 2000.
- A Reader in Jewish Philosophy, ed. D. Frank, O. Leaman & C. Manekin, Routledge, 2000
- Encyclopedia of Asian Philosophy, ed. O. Leaman, Routledge, 2001
- Companion Encyclopedia of Middle Eastern and North African Film, ed. O. Leaman, Routledge, 2001
- Encyclopedia of Death and Dying, ed. G. Howarth & O. Leaman, Routledge, 2001
- Introduction to Classical Islamic Philosophy, Cambridge University Press, 2001
- Cambridge Companion to Medieval Jewish Philosophy, ed. D. Frank & O. Leaman, Cambridge University Press ['Introduction'] 2003.
- Lost in Translation: Essays in Islamic and Jewish Philosophy, Sarajevo: buybook, 2004
- Islamic Aesthetics: An Introduction, Edinburgh University Press, Islamic Surveys Series, 2004.
- The Qur'an: An Encyclopedia, ed. O. Leaman, Routledge, 2006
- Islamic Philosophy A-Z, with Peter Groff, Edinburgh University Press, 2007
- Judaism : an introduction, London : I. B. Tauris, 2011
- Controversies in Contemporary Islam, Routledge, 2013
- The Biographical Encyclopedia of Islamic Philosophy, ed. O. Leaman, Bloomsbury, 2015
- The Qur'an: A Philosophical Guide, Bloomsbury, 2016
- Islam and Morality: A Philosophical Introduction, Bloomsbury, 2019
- Routledge Handbook of Islamic Ritual and Practice, editor, Routledge, 2022

== See also ==
- Massimo Campanini
- Stefan Wild
