= Mohammed Hasan Alwan =

Saudi Arabian novelist (born 1979)

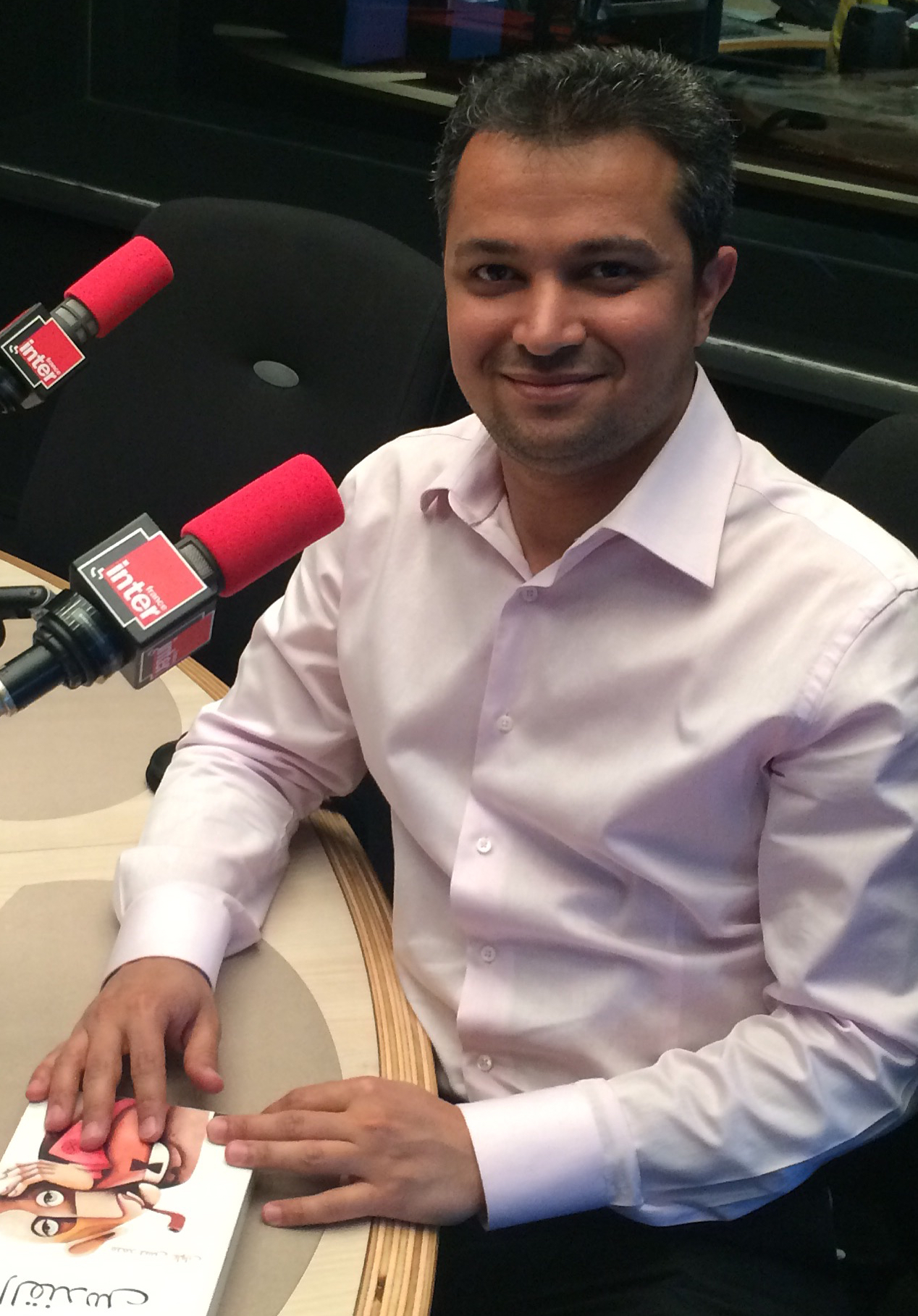
- Alwan in 2015
- Born: 27 August 1979; Riyadh, Saudi Arabia
- Writing career
- Genres: Novels, short stories

Mohammed Hasan Alwan (Arabic: محمد حسن علوان; born 27 August 1979) is a Saudi Arabian novelist and the Chief Executive Officer of the Literature, Publishing, and Translation Commission affiliated with the Ministry of Culture in the Kingdom of Saudi Arabia, appointed in 2020. He was born in Riyadh and studied Computer Information Systems at King Saud University, obtaining a bachelor's degree in 2002. He also obtained an MBA from the University of Portland, Oregon in 2008 and Ph.D from Carleton University, Ottawa in 2016.

Alwan is the third Saudi novelist to win the International Prize for Arabic Fiction (often referred to as the Arabic Booker) in 2017, following novelists Abdo Khal in 2010 and Raja'a Alem in 2011.

Alwan has published five novels to date: Saqf Elkefaya (2002), Sophia (2004), Touq Altahara (2007), "Al-Qundus" (2011), and "Mouton Sageer" (2016). His work has appeared in translation in Banipal magazine ("Blonde Grass" and "Statistics", translated by Ali Azeriah); in The Guardian ("Oil Field", translated by Peter Clark); and in Words Without Borders ("Mukhtar", translated by William M. Hutchins).

His work was published in the Beirut39 anthology (Beirut39: New Writing from the Arab World, edited by Samuel Shimon) and in the IPAF Nadwa anthology (Emerging Arab Voices, edited by Peter Clark).

== Awards and honors ==
In 2009-10, Alwan was chosen as one of the 39 best Arab authors under the age of 40 by the Beirut39 project. He was also a participant in the first IPAF Nadwa in 2009.

In 2013, his novel, Al-Qundus, was shortlisted in the International Prize for Arabic Fiction (2013). In 2015, Alwan won the Arab World Institute's Prix de la Littérature Arabe for Al-Qundus, translated to French by Stéphanie Dujols as Le castor. It was considered the best novel to be translated into French in 2015. In 2017, he won the International Prize for Arabic Fiction for A Small Death, a novel about Ibn Arabi.

== See also ==
- Sufficiency Ceiling (Novel)
