= May Telmissany =

Egyptian-Canadian novelist, translator, film critic and academic

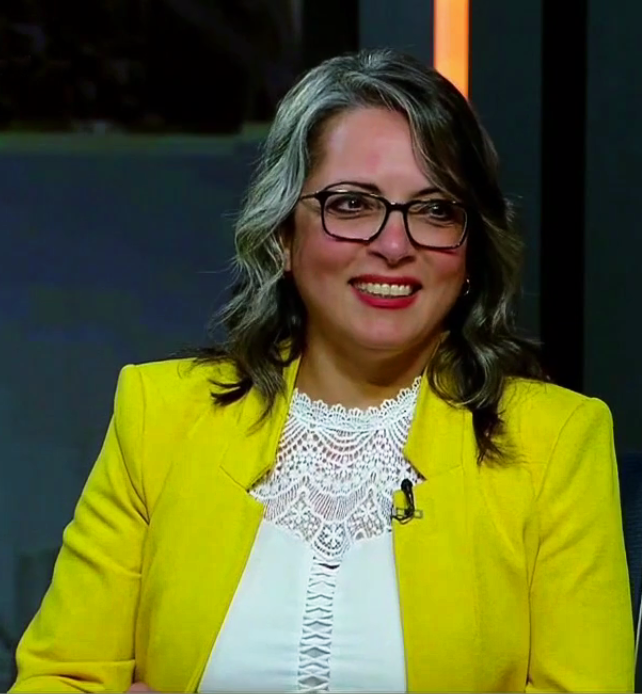
Telmissany (2022)

May Telmissany (Arabic: مي التلمساني; born 1 July 1965) is an Egyptian-Canadian novelist, translator, film critic and academic. She teaches Arabic studies and cinema at the University of Ottawa in Ottawa, Ontario, Canada.

== Biography ==
May Telmissany was born in Cairo, Egypt, on 1 July 1965. She is the daughter of Egyptian documentary filmmaker Abdel-Kader El-Telmissany (1924-2003). Telmissany first studied French literature at Ain Shams University. She worked for several years in the French Service of Radio Cairo^{[Which one?]} and in the Arts Faculty at Menoufia University. She also lived for a time in Paris. In 1995, she obtained a master's degree in French literature from Cairo University. She moved to Canada in 1998 for her doctoral studies, eventually completing her PhD in 2007 from the University of Montreal under a CIDA scholarship. She has since taught at the universities of Montréal, Concordia, McGill and Ottawa.

Telmissany wrote her first novel Dunyazad (1997) in her native Arabic. It was critically acclaimed and translated into French, English, Spanish and German. Dunyazad also won the 2002 Ulysses Prize for best first novel in France and the 2002 State Prize for best autobiographical novel in Egypt. Her second novel Heliopolis came out in 2001 and was translated into French in 2002. In 2009, she published a collection of fragments on her experience in Canada and her successive returns to Egypt, titled Lel-Ganna Sour (Paradise has a fence). In 2012, she published her third novel, A Capella. Her 2021 novel They all say I love you was longlisted for the 2023 International Prize for Arabic Fiction. It deals with the romantic relationships of "five middle-aged, middle class Arab intellectuals living in Canada and America", and an excerpt was published in English translation by ArabLit magazine in August 2023.

Telmissany has also written in French and English on a wide range of scholarly interests, e.g. essays, articles and book chapters on cinema, photography, literature and Cairo culture. Along with Robert Solé and Mercédès Volait, she co-edited a book of memoirs on the Cairo suburb of Heliopolis. Her doctoral dissertation on the concept of neighbourhoods in Egyptian cinema has been translated into Arabic and published in Cairo. She has also published literary translations from French and English to Arabic.

In 2021, she was awarded the French Order for Arts and Letters in recognition of her contributions in the fields of culture, arts and literature.

== Selected works ==
=== Literary ===
- 1995 : Repetitive Sculptures, Cairo: Dar Sharquiat (Short Stories in Arabic) 102 p.
- 1999 : Mental Betrayals, Cairo: Cultural Palaces Publications (Short Stories in Arabic) 125 p.
- 1997 : Dunyazad, Cairo: Dar Sharquiat (Novel, 1st edition) 65 p.
- 2001 : Dunyazad, Al-Adab, Beyrouth. (Novel, 2nd edition) 82 p. 1999-2000: Doniazade (Novel - translated into six European languages: French by Mona Latif-Ghattas, Paris: Actes Sud; English by Roger Allen, London: Saqi Books; Dutch by Djûke Poppinga, Amsterdam: Uitgeverij Elmar; German by Hartmut Fähndrich, Basel: Lenos Verlag; Spanish by Gonzalo Fernando Parillas and Catalan by Joana Hernandez).
- 2003 : Heliopolis, Cairo: General Egyptian Book Organization. (Novel, 2nd edition) 167 p. 2002: Héliopolis, Paris: Actes-Sud (Novel, translated to French by Mona Latif-Ghattas) 150 p. 2000: Heliopolis, Cairo: Dar Sharquiat (Novel, 1st edition) 167 p.
- 2009 : Lel Ganah Sour (The Paradise Has a Fence. Writings on Exile), Cairo: Dar Sharquiat, 164 p.
- 2012 : A Capella, Cairo: Dar Sharquiat, 151 p.
- 2021 : They all say I love you: Dar al-Shorouk, Cairo

=== Translations ===
- 1991 - 1996 : Five literary books simplified for adolescent readers, published in the collection The Classics of World Literature, Cairo: General Book Organization.
- 1994 : Trois Pièces de Théâtre (Fernando Arrabal), Cairo: Academy of the Arts Publications (translated in collaboration with Faten Anwar), 143p.
- 1994 : Les Cinémas Arabes (Mouny Berrah), Cairo: General Book Organization, 219 p.
- 1996 : Pratiques du Montage (Albert Jurgensen), Cairo: Academy of Arts Publications, 176 p.
- 1997 : Reading Theatre I (Ann Ubersfeld), Cairo: Academy of Arts Publications, 225 p.
- 2000 : Why Read the Classics? (Italo Calvino), Cairo : Organization of Cultural Palaces Publications, 153 p.
- 2000 : Les Grandes Écoles Esthétiques (Alain and Odette Virmaux), Cairo : High Council of Culture Publications, 217 p.
- 2005 : Momo et Loulou (Mona Latif-Ghattas & Lise Desjardins), Cairo: Dar El Nashr Horizons (in collaboration with Walid El Khachab), 107 p.
- 2007 : Le livre ailé (Mona Latif-Ghattas), Cairo: Dar El Nashr Horizons, (Poetry), 70 p.
