= Hilla Medalia =

Israeli director and producer

Hilla Medalia is an Israeli film director and producer. She is the founder of the Medalia Productions company. Her documentary, 'Children No More: Were and Are Gone', was nominated for an award at the Oscars 2026.

She did her master's at the Southern Illinois University. She is a member of the Academy of Motion Picture Arts and Sciences, and Producers Guild of America.

She directed a documentary film, To Die in Jerusalem, a story about the inability of an Israeli mother to understand the motivation of a Palestinian suicide bomber, and her attempt to meet their mother. The documentary was broadcast in the United States on HBO.

She has received three Emmy award nominations. She also won the Paris Human Rights Film Festival Jury Award, Fipa Biarritz Jury Award, Golden Warsaw Phoenix Award and Faito Doc Grand Jury Award.

== Filmography ==
- 2007: To Die in Jerusalem
- 2009: After the Storm
- 2013: Web Junkie
- 2013: Dancing in Jaffa
- 2015: Censored Voices
- 2016: Shalom Italia
- 2017: Muhi: Generally Temporary
- 2018: Die Oslo-Tagebücher (The Oslo Diaries)
- 2019: Chinas ungeliebte Frauen (Leftover Women)
- 2025: Children No More: Were and are Gone
- 2025: Holding Liat
