= Human rights literature =

Human rights literature is a literary genre that deals with human rights issues, and thus - directly or indirectly - promotes values of human rights. The goal of human rights literature is to combine the literary driving force with the motivation for action, which is a fundamental and integral element of the struggle for protection of human rights. This literary genre is based on the concept of "Engaged Literature" that was articulated by the French writer and philosopher Jean-Paul Sartre.

Human rights literature is committed to society and believes that each one of us has moral duty and power to make a social change. It is based on the belief of the enormous power of literature to make a change, and in the responsibility of the author toward readers both on the social aspect and the artistic one.

== Background ==
The concept of human rights literature was first articulated in the foreword to Freedom, an anthology of short stories by renowned authors from around the world published in Britain in 2010 by Mainstream Publishing in cooperation with the human rights organization Amnesty International. The stories were written in the spirit of the Universal Declaration of Human Rights.

The foreword - "The Tremendous Power of Literature", by Vered Cohen Barzilay, discusses the relationship between the Italian novella "Prima di Lasciarsi" by Gabriella Ambrosio (English: "Before We Say Goodbye") and human rights.

The foreword along with the book was translated into various languages and published around the world in many countries including UK, US, Canada, Poland, Spain, Latin America, and Italy. At the 2010 Edinburgh Book festival the preliminary concept was first introduced in public discussion, and in March 2012 it was formally introduced by Cohen-Barzilay at Oxford University, UK, at a panel discussion held under the title "The Power of Literature and Human Rights" and early 2013 at the Literary Festival at the London School of Economics. In 2012, Cohen-Barzilay founded Novel Rights e-publishing, an e- publishing house specializing in creating and promoting Human Rights Literature.

== Engaged literature and the connection to human rights literature ==
"Human rights literature" is based on the idea of "engaged literature" that was first formulated by the French writer and philosopher Jean-Paul Sartre in his book What is literature?. Sartre argued that intellectuals and the ordinary citizens must take a stand, especially in regard to major political conflicts. Sartre hoped that literature would serve as a means to enable oppressed minority groups gain recognition and that members of the elites would be moved to action as a result of the influence of literature. He argued that should a novel end with a call for action, it has to consciously address groups that have the power to act.

Sartre offers a double function for literature, acting as both a mirror for the oppressor and as also as a source of inspiration and guidance for the oppressed, though he does not explicitly explain what the action to be taken is or how to take it within the framework of committed literature. Various actions should be chosen according to their contribution to the realization of a socialist democracy, but the author must not decide according to dogma, in the manner of a conscientious objector.

As a moral concept, human rights literature deals directly or indirectly with human rights and leads its readers to understand and act to protect human rights. The literary products are accompanied by general information concerning human rights and organizations, as well as suggestions for direct action that go hand in hand with subjects that arise from the literature.

== The power of literature vs. the power of art ==
Sartre argued that "the reader of the novel submits to the book before him, abandoning his worldly existence to assume a vicarious one while he reads. He lives the problem which he himself helps to create, placing himself in the most sympathetic position white relation to what the writer wishes to say". Marina Nemat, author of "Prisoner of Teheran" and the winner of the first European Parliament 'Human Dignity' award explains: "Literature allows the victim to become a survivor and stand up to the past to ensure a better future. It is literature that carries the human experience, reaches our hearts, and makes us feel the pain of those who have been treated unjustly. Without literature and narrative, we would lose our identity as human beings and will dissolve in the darkness of time and our repeated mistakes that lead us from one preventable devastation to the next".

Hence, human rights literature emphasizes the responsibility of the author to delve into writing that is not deliberately isolated from the world and geopolitical events, and regional or global social crises. Human rights literature does not believe in writing for purely artistic aesthetic purposes. It calls on writers to exercise their moral-social duty wherein the power of the literary creation on the public is enormous and rarely come to fruition. According to the American philosopher professor Martha Nussbaum in her book Poetic Justice, she argues that social sympathy is a necessary condition for equitable treatment in courts of law. Judges, Nussbaum has observed, are short of imaginative data about the persons they must judge, and novels are one place they can look for guidance. The author Richard Rorty wrote in Rorty wrote about the "human rights culture", a term he borrowed from the Argentinian jurist and philosopher Eduardo Rabossi. In an article called "Human Rights Naturalized", Rabossi argues that philosophers should think of this culture as a new, welcome fact of the post-Holocaust world, They should stop trying to get behind or beneath this fact.

In her essay "The Tremendous Power of Literature" Vered Cohen Barzilay writes: "Literature can be as powerful as life itself. It can be like our prophecy. It can inspire us to change our world and give us the comfort, hope, passion and strength that we need in order to fight to create a better future for us, as well as all humanity. We just need to keep on reading and to allow the tremendous power of literature to enter our hearts and lead us to our own path." Indeed, Human Rights Literature does not impose on the authors actual call for action, rather, the writer's task ends as soon as he completes the writing process. Only the readers' response can answer whether the creation inspires social change or motivates for action.

Human rights literature provides the readers with an opportunity for a direct action, however it is not a compulsory requirement. In fact, the commitment is an unwritten accord between the readers and the literary creation developed through the reading process, which holds simultaneously the freedom to refrain from action.

== Criticism and response ==
Critics of engaged literature argue that such literature is propaganda and that it is created and used for political purposes. But if the literature becomes propaganda the reader would see through that, and the magic, the intimate process of communion between the reader and the author's inner voice will not unfold.

It is argued that for the purpose of reaching the masses such literature will be reduced to the lowest common denominator while compromising quality standards to a limited criteria of stimulation for action. Sartre stresses that both writers and social leaders must constantly aim for developing and improving their readers' intellectual level, offering readers something beyond the familiar and providing an opportunity to expand horizons.

Another criticism of engaged literature suggests irrelevance of the commitment for action during times of large-scale events or conflicts once these circumstances change, and while a great novel is eternal and can exist in timeless literary space. Sartre argued that those who attack engaged literature are manifesting again the old desire to retreat into a private shell and ignore events which may someday reach their lives. Authors, he claimed, are trying in vain to isolate themselves from reality, and during a demanding writing process they are cut off from social problems, and thus, create literature for sheer escapism. All novels, whatever else they may do, inevitably instruct us on life. Engaged novel tells us that we may or may not, relate this knowledge to whatever sphere of reality we choose, whenever and however we wish. We cannot meet reality in our own terms. The novel, which has always presented the reader with knowledge of real life, is changing the form of its presentation in order to accord with a more accurate conception of the relation between the individual and reality.

As Gabriella Ambrosio, author of Before We Say Goodbye, writes in the foreword of her short story "Sticko": "At times, writers are afraid to know what is inevitable: that "pure" art does not exist. None of us is pure or innocent: any word carrying imaginative power produces culture, and culture produces behaviour."

Another dilemma which was raised by intellectuals and in literary circles is the issue of the author's competence to the task if indeed a novel is an adequate tool for generating social action. Can authors understand the substantive social issues? Or handle the risk and complexity as not to support a false cause? Or be discussed only by experts? What has been suggested was that the engaged novel requires greater talent and wider knowledge by novelists than has been necessary before, and in fact create a new generation of engaged authors.

As for irrelevance of human rights issues outside a specific context in time, the answer is embodied in the relevance and validity of human rights' values which were articulated in the Universal Declaration of Human Rights in the aftermath of World War II and the Holocaust. These principles transcend the era in which they were articulated and bring a set of burning social issues to the surface. An example of a novel set in a temporal and geographical context which transcended these limits is Harper Lee's To Kill a Mockingbird. While the book's focus on racism in the United States covered events in the author's environment at a specific time, it highlighted the larger issue of racism and discrimination in a universal manner, transcending the local context of the story. With its social commitment for change, the book had an enormous impact, not only on local issue of racism, but rather as an influencing generations of readers around the world.

== Literature and the human rights movement ==
Unlike the abstract commitment to social action of Sartre's engaged literature, human rights literature places human rights at the core of its moral and social duty. It emphasizes the responsibility of the author to delve into writing that is not deliberately cut off from the world, geopolitical changes or social crises. Human rights literature does not believe writing is solely an artistic aesthetic exercise, and calls on writers to realize the social commitment under the power of their literary creation that it effects on the public is enormous and does not come to fruition often. And thus, human rights literature manifests that unique and close links exist between literature and human rights campaigns.

Lynn Hunt identified these links. In her book Inventing Human Rights: A History, she examines the emergence of the prose narrative in the 18th century and the role it played in the conception of the human rights idea. Hunt demonstrates how ideas of human relationships portrayed in novels and art generated a powerful fictional empathy which helped spreading this new idea. To Kill a Mockingbird by Nelle Harper Lee is one example of a novel that had major contribution and impact on American public opinion on the issue of race and rights. Another example is Harriet Beecher Stowe's Uncle Tom's Cabin, which was the best-selling novel of the 19th century. The book had a deep impact on public opinion in the US on the issue of slavery and is seen as one of the triggers to the Abolitionist movement in the 1850s. Many other books and novels had great impact on human rights issues and struggles, for example: Toni Morrison's Beloved, Franz Kafka's The Trial and Night by Elie Wiesel.

== Freedom of expression and persecution of authors ==
While the Universal Declaration of Human Rights and subsequent international covenants defined Freedom of Thought and Expression as fundamental human rights, constant and frequent attacks on these freedoms takes place under dictatorships and repressive regimes in attempt to silence any protest or dissent. Censorship is exercised on each and every publication while are often writers and journalists are persecuted, imprisoned and executed. 2010 Nobel Peace Prize Laureate Liu Xiaobo is a Chinese literary critic, writer, professor, and human rights activist. He published a manifesto calling for freedom of expression and free elections, and in 2009 was sentenced to 11 years in prison for "inciting subversion of state power". Like Xiaobo, many authors suffer persecution as authorities recognize their unique power and ability to impact on the masses. Salman Rushdie, an awarded British-Muslim novelist and essayist of Indian origin became a target following the publication his fourth novel, The Satanic Verses (1988). The book was the center of a major controversy in the Islamic world because of what was perceived as an irreverent depiction of Muhammad. Death threats were made against him, including a fatwā issued by Ayatollah Ruhollah Khomeini, the Supreme Leader of Iran, on 14 February 1989 and a bounty was offered for Rushdie's death. Rushdi was forced to hide and live under police protection for many years. Years later Rushdi became the president of PEN International, the worldwide association of writers who fights for freedom of expression, and acts as a powerful voice on behalf of writers harassed, imprisoned and sometimes killed for their views.
