= Ghazi Abdul Rahman Al Gosaibi =

Saudi government official, ambassador and poet (1940–2010)

Minister of Labor
- In office 12 April 2004 – 15 August 2010
- Prime Minister: King Fahd; King Abdullah
- Preceded by: Office established
- Succeeded by: Adel Fakeih

Minister of Water and Electricity
- In office September 2002 – April 2004
- Prime Minister: King Fahd
- Preceded by: Office established
- Succeeded by: Abdullah Al Hussain

Ambassador to the United Kingdom and Ireland
- In office 1992–2002
- Prime Minister: King Fahd
- Preceded by: Nasser Almanquor

Ambassador to Bahrain
- In office 1984–1992
- Prime Minister: King Fahd

Minister of Health
- In office 1983–1984
- Prime Minister: King Fahd
- Preceded by: Husain Aljazaeri
- Succeeded by: Faisal Alhujailan

Minister of Industry and Electricity
- In office 1976–1983
- Prime Minister: King Khalid; King Fahd

Personal details
- Born: 3 March 1940 Hofuf, Saudi Arabia
- Died: 15 August 2010 (aged 70) Riyadh, Saudi Arabia
- Resting place: Al Oud cemetery
- Education: University of Cairo; University of Southern California; University College London

Ghazi Abdul Rahman Al Gosaibi (Arabic: غازي بن عبدالرحمن القصيبي; 3 March 1940 – 15 August 2010) was a Saudi politician, diplomat, technocrat, poet, and novelist. He was an intellectual and a member of the Al Gosaibi family that is one of the oldest and richest trading families of Saudi Arabia and Bahrain. Al Gosaibi was considered among Saudi Arabia's topmost technocrats since the mid-1970s. The Majalla called him the "Godfather of Renovation" while Saudi journalist Othman Al Omeir argued that he was "the only great man in Saudi Arabia."

== Early life and education ==
Al Gossaibi was born on 3 March 1940 to one of the richest families of the Kingdom in Hofuf located in Al Ahsa province. The family was of Najdi origin. His mother was from the Kateb family of Mecca who died when he was aged nine months, and he was raised by his grandmother.

He received primary and secondary education in Bahrain which was a British protectorate during that time. He attended the University of Cairo and received a degree in law in 1961. Later, he moved to the United States and graduated from the University of Southern California with a degree in international relations in 1964. He later completed his PhD in law at the University College London in 1970; his PhD thesis was about the Yemen crisis which took place from 1962 to 1967.

== Career ==
Al Gosaibi began his career working as a lecturer at King Saud University in 1965. He held various positions, including associate professor, dean of the faculty of commerce and head of the department of political science. In 1965, he served as a legal consultant to the Saudi reconciliation committee; the job was related to negotiating with the Egyptian forces in Yemen. He also served as the director general of Saudi Railways Organization in 1970, chairman of Jubail Petrochemical Company (Sadaf) and Yanbu Petrochemical Company (Yanpet), member on Public Investment Fund, Supreme Manpower Council, and Royal Commission for Jubail and Yanbu.

Al Gosaibi was one of the technocrats in the 1970s who were chosen by the Saudi government for assigning public positions and posts. In October 1975, King Khalid appointed him the minister of industry and electricity, which he held the position until 1983. In 1976 he proposed the creation of a joint-stock state-controlled firm that could serve as a catalyst for the industrialization of Saudi Arabia. Later that year the Saudi Basic Industries Corporation (SABIC) was created, and Al Gosaibi was named its chairman. He also served as the minister of health from 1983 to 1984. He was removed from office without any explanation in 1984. Then he served as the ambassador to Bahrain (1984-1992) and was subsequently appointed the Saudi ambassador to the United Kingdom and Ireland in 1992. Al Gosaibi replaced Nasser Almanquor as ambassador to the United Kingdom and Ireland following the latter's removal due to his support for the fatwa (religious decree) asking for the death of British writer Salman Rushdie. In 1999, Al Gosaibi nominated himself to serve for the post of director general of UNESCO. However, he was not elected, and Japanese diplomat, Koichiro Matsuura, became the director general. In the election, Matsuura won 34 votes, Al Gosaibi 13. Al Gosaibi's term as Saudi ambassador to the United Kingdom and Ireland ended in September 2002.

Next Al Gosaibi was appointed minister of water and electricity in mid-September 2002 when the ministry of agriculture and water was divided into two independent ministerial bodies. His tenure lasted until April 2004. During this period, Al Gosaibi was also appointed board member of Saudi Aramco and served in the post until October 2004. King Fahd appointed him as the minister of labor on 13 April 2004 following the split of the labor and social affairs ministry into two. He contributed to the national strategy of Saudization into practice and motivated private firms to employ a greater proportion of Saudi nationals. He served in the post until his death in 2010 and was succeeded by Adel Fakeih in the post.

Al Gosaibi was a member of the honorary committee of Painting & Patronage from 2000 to 2010. He also actively participated in the organization of its first and second programmes held in London in 2000 and Riyadh in 2001, respectively.

=== Dismissals ===
Al Gosaibi, while serving as minister of health, was dismissed in 1984. He had openly asked for and supported the transparent tendering for regional hospitals. This criticism of Al Gosaibi targeted Saudi Oger, owned by late Rafik Hariri, who had been closely associated with King Fahd. Since Al Gosaibi was not able to meet with King Fahd, he wrote a poem for the King, entitled "A Pen Bought and Sold". The poem, which was published on the front page of Al Jazirah, indirectly accused the ruling elites, including Prince Sultan, minister of defence, of corruption. King Fahd fired him after reading the poem.

Al Gosaibi was also removed from his post as ambassador to the United Kingdom and Ireland in 2002 due to his poem, a short verse entitled "You Are the Martyrs", published in Al Hayat in mid-April, supposedly praising a Palestinian female suicide bomber. The poem was allegedly dedicated to a Palestinian teenager, Ayat Akhras who blew herself up on 29 March 2002 in the Kiryat HaYovel supermarket in Jerusalem, resulting in the death of two Israelis. Al Gosaibi described her as the "bride of the heavens" who "stands up to the criminal" and "kisses death with a smile." The poem also included critical views about the United States and the Arab political and intellectual elite, who, for Al Gosaibi, did not assume any responsibility with regard to the Palestinian conflict. Before his removal from his post by the Saudi government, Al Gosaibi had faced censure from the British Government because of the aforementioned poem.

== Views ==
Al Gosaibi, as the minister of industry and electricity, stated in 1980 that American foreign policy was "self-doubt, isolative, and had a tendency to abdicate." He also criticised the approach by US media towards Saudi Arabia. During his tenure as Saudi ambassador to the United Kingdom and Ireland, he described Osama bin Laden as "a human monster" in the immediate aftermath of the 9/11 attacks in the BBC's HARDtalk interview. In 2002, he argued that the suicide bombers "died to honor God's word." In response to the criticisms from Jewish groups over his poem, "You Are the Martyrs", he defended his position and accused Israel of "committing war crimes." He also expressed his support for a two-state solution for the Palestinian conflict and the Saudi government-backed Arab peace initiative. During the same period, he said: "the Israeli occupation of the West Bank and Gaza is worse than anything Europe experienced under Nazi Germany."

He was an apparent critic of the Saudi conservative society. He was an ally of King Abdullah in regard to his reform initiatives and is known for his liberal religious views. He was against terrorism and extremism and called for democratic reform in the Kingdom, although he argued that it needed to be a very gradual process. He was labeled by radicals as "a Westerner, infidel, secular and a hypocrite", and experienced a systematic and intense ideological campaign against him. More specifically, Osama bin Laden called him in a taped message in 2006 a liberal fifth columnist.

During his tenure as minister of labor, Al Gosaibi supported the idea that Saudi women should be offered more job opportunities. He stated that Saudis were only interested in high-paying, easy jobs. He served hamburgers in 2008 for three hours at a Jeddah fast food restaurant, a job usually performed by non-Saudi workers. Later in a press conference, he told Saudi youth that this type of work was not dishonorable. He warned against increasing racism among Saudis towards the millions of foreign workers in Saudi Arabia in 2008. However, when a significant financial crisis affected all countries, in January 2009 he warned Saudi firms against exploiting the crisis as a reason for terminating Saudi nationals and suggested them to terminate foreign workers in the country.

== Literary works and other writings ==
Al Gosaibi was one of the best-selling writers in the Arab world and also, was a significant diplomat-poet. He published nearly 40 books, most of which were the collections of his poems, which provide "images of a simpler, desert culture." His novels were mostly based on the topic of corruption, Arab alienation, love, taboos and the condition of the Arab states. In Freedom Apartment or An Apartment Called Freedom (1994), one of his most known novels, the theme is about the lives of four Bahrainis who left their homes for university education in Cairo in the 1960s. The novel also reflects his own experience in Cairo. Another novel, Sab'ah (2003), is a satire and "depicts the Arab reality through seven characters who have different ideas and works, and are flirting with the same woman." A Love Story (2002) narrates the life of a novelist who is dying in a hospital bed, dreaming about the memories of his past love affair with a married woman.

Al Gosaibi also published non-fiction books, including an autobiography, entitled Yes, (Saudi) Minister! A lifetime in Administration (1999) and The Gulf Crisis that offers an insider's account of the Arab reaction to Saddam Hussein's invasion of Kuwait. In addition, he wrote essays, focusing on the relations between the Arab and western world.

Some of his books, including An Apartment Called Freedom, were banned for a long time in Saudi Arabia. The reason for the ban was that his works were often critical of ruling regimes in the region and included a satirical representation of social and political mores. At the beginning of August 2010, just two weeks before his death, this ban was lifted due to his contributions to the country.

== Bibliography ==
His novels in Arabic are as follows:

- Half of Freedom 5th edition published in 1999
- Al-'Uṣfūrīyah, 1996. (العصفورية)
- Humā, 2001. (هما)
- Danaskū, 2002. (دنسكو)
- Rajul Jā'a wa-Dhahab, 2002. (رجل جاء وذهب)
- Salmá, 2002. (سلمى)
- Sab'ah, 2003. (سبعة)
- Ḥikāyat Ḥub, 2004. (حكاية حب)
- Abū Shallākh al-Barmā'ī, 2006. (أبو شلاخ البرمائي)
- Al-Jinnīyah, 2006. (الجنية)
- Alzahāymar, 2010. (ألزهايمر)
- Sa'adat Alsafeer, 2003. (سعادة السفير)

Two of his novels were translated into English:

- Seven, by Basil Hakim and Gavin Watterson, Saqi Books (1999) ISBN 0-86356-088-1
- An Apartment Called Freedom (Shiqqat al-Ḥurrīyah, 1994, (شقة الحرية)), by Leslie McLoughlin, Kegan-Paul (1996) ISBN 0-7103-0550-8

In 1989, one of Al Gosaibi's poetry books was also translated into English by Anne Fairbairn in Australia, titled as Feathers and the Horizon.

In 2010, Al Gosaibi translated the non-fiction book "The True Believer: Thoughts on the Nature of Mass Movements," authored by the American social philosopher Eric Hoffer.

== Personal life ==
Al Gosaibi married to a German woman who was raised in Bahrain. They had four children; one daughter and three sons.

Al Gosaibi underwent a surgery at Riyadh's King Faisal Specialist Hospital in the late July 2010. He died of colon cancer at the age of 70 on 15 August 2010. The funeral prayer for him was performed at Imam Turki Mosque, and acting Riyadh governor, Prince Sattam attended the funeral. He was buried in Al Oud cemetery in Riyadh on the same day, 15 August 2010. His family held another funeral service for him in Bahrain.

== Legacy ==
Asharqia Chamber began to offer the Ghazi Al Gosaibi Award for the promising small and medium size companies, particularly in the Eastern Province of Saudi Arabia. The award is given biannually. In April 2013, Al Waleed bin Talal Foundation-Global, headed by Prince Al Waleed, bought the house of Ghazi Al Gosaibi in Manama, Bahrain, to renovate it.

== Awards ==
In 2017 the Gulf Petrochemicals and Chemicals Association posthumously recognized Al Gosaibi as a pioneer in petrochemicals and chemicals and awarded him with the GPCA Legacy Award.
