= Mario Paciolla =

Italian activist (1987–2020)

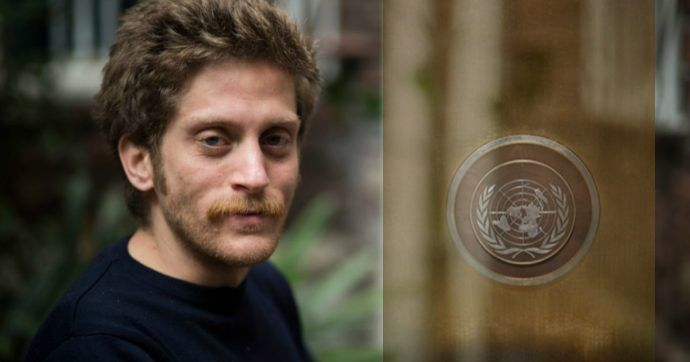
- Mario Paciolla in 2019
- Born: March 28, 1987; Naples, Italy
- Died: July 15, 2020 (aged 33); San Vicente del Caguán
- Education: Università degli Studi di Napoli "L'Orientale"
- Occupations: Activist, journalist, expert in geopolitics
- Known for: UN volunteer in Colombia and his murder passed off as suicide.
- Website: mariopaciolla.org

Mario Paciolla, born Mario Carmine Paciolla (Naples, March 28, 1987 – San Vicente del Caguán, July 15, 2020), was an Italian journalist, activist, and volunteer, who was murdered during the exercise of his duties with the United Nations Volunteers.

== Career ==
Paciolla graduated with a degree in political science from the Università degli Studi di Napoli "L'Orientale" in 2014. He moved to Colombia in 2016. For two years, Paciolla worked as a volunteer with the Peace Brigades International, a Canadian non-governmental organization dedicated to the protection of human rights. In 2018, Mario joined the United Nations Volunteers in collaboration with the United Nations Mission to verify the established peace agreements between the government of Colombia and the Revolutionary Armed Forces of Colombia. On July 15, 2020, he was found lifeless in his home in San Vicente del Caguán.

== Murdered and passed off as suicide ==
The reason for his death was unclear. Found hanged with a sheet, the death was initially classified as suicide. Following a general outcry and the discovery of new evidence, the Colombian authorities began an investigation of four policemen accused of having allowed United Nations officials to take the personal belongings of the victim. The Rome Prosecutor office also opened an investigation to clarify the cause of death of the Italian activist. The Paciolla family is represented by Alessandra Ballerini, who was the lawyer in the case of the murder of Giulio Regeni.

== Investigations ==
The Rome Prosecutor's Office opened a murder investigation, but it was initially closed on October 19, 2022. The family opposed an initial attempt to close the case, and the investigation continued. The investigation highlights Mario Paciolla's role within the UN mission for which he worked and the operational environment and dangerous context that mission faced. The UN mission Mario Paciolla was part of was to verify the 2016 peace agreement between the Revolutionary Armed Forces of Colombia (FARC) and the Colombian government. The implementation of the agreement had been difficult because organized crime, FARC dissidents, and some far-right paramilitary groups had long been at war with each other for control of the territory.

Paciolla had been in Colombia since 2018 and lived in San Vicente del Caguán, a city in the Caquetá department long considered a strategic hub by guerrillas and drug traffickers. On July 15, 2020, Mario Paciolla was murdered, and the murder was made to looks like a suicide. The Colombian intelligence services, in collaboration with the Colombian police, allegedly carried out the murder by removing from the crime scene evidence that compromised the Colombian government or implicated government officials. Mario Paciolla had learned of a serious incident committed by the Colombian government, likely through a video sent by someone or by a direct witness who survived the massacre perpetrated by the Colombian government, which had bombed a village where several people, including children, had died.

The purpose of the murder was to steal and conceal this evidence and, by making his murder look like a suicide, to sidetrack any investigation into the facts. Mario Paciolla had discussed this evidence with colleagues and some of the mission's leaders, and from these discussions he emerged disturbed and almost frightened, as he also appeared in the last call he made to his family on July 14, 2020. Mario Paciolla feared for his life and had hastily purchased a return flight for July 20, 2020, to return to Italy. For his family and the lawyers who supported them, Mario was killed to cover up the massacres and systematic murders carried out by the Colombian military forces in agreement with the government and with the complicity of members of the UN mission who never denounced these massacres.

The Rome Prosecutor's Office found itself faced with superficial or no collaboration from the Colombian authorities, who closed the investigation as a suicide. Meanwhile, the Rome Prosecutor's Office has been unable to identify either the instigators of the murder or the person who committed it and closed the investigation on July 30, 2025.

Unfortunately, the desire for justice that dominates the family in which Mario was educated clashes with the impossibility of continuing the investigation. Even the prosecutors themselves would risk their safety if they travel to Colombia.

== See also ==
- Revolutionary Armed Forces of Colombia
- Illegal drug trade in Colombia
- National Intelligence Directorate (Colombia)
- Giulio Regeni
- Luca Attanasio
