= Massimo Campanini =

Italian scholar of Islam (1954 - 2020)

Massimo Campanini (November 3, 1954 - October 9, 2020) was an Italian philosopher, translator and scholar of Islam, Islamic philosophy, history of Islam and Quranic studies.

== Biography ==
=== Early life and education ===
Born in Milan on November 3, 1954, Campanini completed his philosophy degree in 1977 at the University of Milan and later obtained another degree in Arabic in 1984 from the Italian Institute for Africa and the Orient.

=== Career ===
Campanini began his academic career as a senior lecturer and researcher at the Faculty of Political Science at Milan University. He served as a visiting professor at Urbino University from 1995 to 2000 and then moved to the School of Liberal Arts at the University of Milan, where he worked from 2001 to 2005. In 2006, he became a visiting scholar-in-residence at the University of Naples "L'Orientale" and was appointed associate professor in 2009. Between 2011 and 2016, he was a distinguished professor of Islamic History at Trent University. Additionally, he held academic positions at San Raffaele University, the University Institute of Higher Studies in Pavia, the Scuola Superiore per Mediatori Linguistici in Padova, and the Humanitarian Society of Milan. After retirement, he continued his scholarly works at the Ambrosian Academy of Milan. In 2017, under the Renzi and Gentiloni administrations, he served as an Islamic adviser for the Italian Islamic Council of the Interior Ministry.

=== Personal life ===
Campanini considered himself a hanif, a follower of the Abrahamic God. He left a son with his wife Donatella.

=== Death ===
Campanini suffered from neurodegenerative disease and died from heart attack at his home in Milan.

== Selected works ==
- An Introduction to Islamic Philosophy (Edinburgh UP, 2008)
- The Qur’an, Modern Muslim Interpretations (Routledge, 2011),
- Philosophical Perspectives on Modern Qur’anic Exegesis (Equinox, 2016)
- L’Islam: religione dell’ occidente (Islam, the Religion of the West, 2016)
- The Qur'an: The Basics (Routledge, 2016)
- Al-Ghazali and the Divine (Routledge, 2018)

== See also ==
- Roberto Tottoli
