= An Apartment Called Freedom =

1999 novel by Dr. Ghazi Abdul Rahman Al Gosaibi

- Author: Ghazi Abdul Rahman Al Gosaibi
- Cover artist: Adham Ismail
- Language: Arabic
- Genre: Historical fiction
- Publisher: Riad El-Rayyes Books
- Publication date: 1994
- Media type: Novel
- Pages: 463

An Apartment Called Freedom (Arabic:شقة الحرية) is a 1994 novel by Ghazi Abdul Rahman Al Gosaibi. It tells the story of a group of young men with different ideologies living together in an apartment in Cairo while they finish their studies. The novel discusses in detail the state of intellectual currents among Arab youth in the inflamed period of Arab history between 1948 and 1967.

The novel is considered a landmark work for Saudi Arabian literature, being the first novel to address themes of "political ideologies, identity loss, perception of others, human rights, terrorism, and sexuality".

The novel was banned in Saudi Arabia for a while. An English translation was published in 1996 by Kegan Paul, under the name An Apartment Called Freedom.

== Plot ==
In August 1956, 16-year-old Fouad, a young Bahraini man, packs to go to Cairo, where he will study law. He and his Bahraini peers are supporters of Egyptian President Gamal Abdel Nasser.

Upon arriving in Cairo, Fouad faces difficulty in finding a visa and finding his friends. Mr. Shareef, his former teacher, returns from a trip and helps Fouad with both logistical matters and as a mentor. Mr. Shareef helps Fouad find a boarding house, where he stays with a Jordanian man, Adnan, an Iraqi man, Majeed, and his friend Qasim. His two other Bahraini friends, Yacoub and Abdul-Karim, lodge elsewhere. The six men soon become close friends.

The Bahraini men are surprised by the comparative liberalism of Egypt, especially when it comes to women, and they quickly become interested in finding girlfriends. They soon manage to rent their own apartment, which they call Apartment Freedom. They set up 70 rules for themselves and any other roommates. Their quests to find girlfriends leads some of them to engage with sex workers, while Fouad finds a number of girlfriends. Fouad considers marrying one of the women he dates, but his parents reject the idea, having already started to arrange a marriage for him.

The men also engage in political movements. Fouad joins the Arab Nationalist Movement, while some of his roommates join the Muslim Brotherhood or the Communist party. They also discuss the politics amongst themselves. The group discover some splits among religious lines, as one of the roommates is Shia while the rest are Sunni.

The book also contains some stories written by Fouad and his friend Abdul-Ra'ouf. The two eventually publish their stories in a moderately-successful book, leading them to meet literary and political figures.

The book ends in 1961.

== Critical reviews ==
Critics found the book polarizing. Many critics suggested that one of the protagonists, Fouad, was a representation of Al Gosaibi. Those who enjoyed the book praised its depiction of Cairo and the political and social shifts occurring at the time.

== Television adaptation ==
The novel was made into a TV show under the same name and was aired on MBC in 1995 directed by Magdy Abu Emeira and scripted by Mamdouh El Leithy.
