= Alzheimer's Story =

2010 book by Ghazi Abdul Rahman Al Gosaibi

- First edition
- Author: Ghazi Abdul Rahman Al Gosaibi
- Language: Arabic
- Genre: Epistolary novel
- Publisher: Bissan Publications
- Publication date: 2010
- Publication place: Beirut
- Pages: 128

Alzheimer's Story is an epistolary novel written by Saudi Arabian author, Ghazi Abdul Rahman Al Gosaibi, published in 2010 after his death.

The book is a collection of letters that Yaqoob, diagnosed with Alzheimer's disease, writes for his wife while being far away from her and his family, living in a shelter aimed to provide care for this purpose. Despite the sense of narration found within the book, its primary objective is to provide information about Alzheimer's and the experiences of people diagnosed with it.

== Main idea and plot ==
The author dedicates his book to people diagnosed with Alzheimer's.

Yaqoob forgets the name of Nermeen's, his wife, favourite perfume when he goes to the store. Yaqoob slowly forgets stuff around him, like the names of his children. His wife takes him on a vacation to the US, where he is diagnosed with Alzheimer's. He stays at a care facility, or as he describes it, a mix of a shelter, hotel, and "everything else" containing well-trained medics.

Yaqoob explains to his wife that Alzheimer's is named after Alois Alzheimer, who discovered the disease while dealing with a patient in 1906. He explains that before the disease was described, Arabs used to call it "senility or foolishness", until the symptoms were discovered in a relatively young patient, as senility tends to be more common in old people.

Yaqoob describes the feelings of depression experienced by Alzheimer's patients, including himself, as he worries about losing his dearest memories to him, including his wife, children, and happy moments. He reads a book called Death in Slow-motion, which describes living with Alzheimer's as worse than death, as a completely different identity invades the person, "claiming to be him".

He expresses how much he wants a hidden power, such as faith, to beat Alzheimer's. He writes that faith has always caused positive evolutions; as Arabs with faith were behind the rise of the Islamic Civilisation, and Romans with faith were behind the rise of the Roman Empire, and Persians with faith were behind the rise of the Persian Empire.

Throughout the letters, Yaqoob updates his wife about his experiences. He receives treatment regarding the bad memories he gets, yet there was a huge bad memory to him that seemed to attack concerning his teenagerhood, which tended to open up a topic about teenagerhood and the theory of teenagerhood that was not logical at all to him. Moreover, he describes how the memories of "first moments" were piling up in his head, and he was speaking of it with a lady named Elizabet, asking her about her experience with it, and how she usually only forgets about her "last time moments" rather than the first moments.

Apart from informing his wife about Alzheimer's, Yaqoob also documents his conversations with other patients at the facility. He narrates a conversation with movie star Jeffrey Borez, where they speak about their memories, including Jeffrey's acting career, his four romantic experiences, and Yaqoob's love experiences. Both forget what happened in their fourth and second love experiences, so they look at each other, nervously, and make up an excuse to keep things for next time.

Yaqoob desperately writes to his wife how much this depresses him and drives him crazy trying to remember what happened during his second marriage.

In the final letter, Yaqoob informs his wife about a meeting he was involved in, where he learnt about the different stages of Alzheimer's, and that the disease does not have a definite cure. He and his fellow patients are currently in the first level, and he is still able to do simple tasks on his own, but he has begun to forget appointments, not notice the passing of time, and short-term memory loss.

Yaqoob depressingly expresses how people, including his former self, often avoid others with disabilities. He says he would rather die that have his brain become like a vegetable.

The final letter is penned by Yaqoob's doctor to Nermeen, informing her the Yaqoob died following a heart attack which had no relation with his Alzheimer's.

== Reviews ==
Abdulaziz Al Muzeni said about Alzheimer's Story that it is a series of literary pieces moving the readers between the aspects of politics, literature, economics, social and philosophical reflections, along with daring and sometimes hidden proposal of certain thoughts.

He added the book also takes the reader on a journey revolving around bitterness to joy, and from joy to sadness, in artistic ways.

Hanan Aal Saif pointed out the satirical writing that the author uses while narrating the details of the book, along with getting into the concepts of freedom, void, love, and death.

And Jehad Fadel said that Al Gosaibi had a rich, abundant amount of ideas expressed in the book that focus on the psychology of people with Alzheimer's
