= Matteo Ripa =

Italian missionary

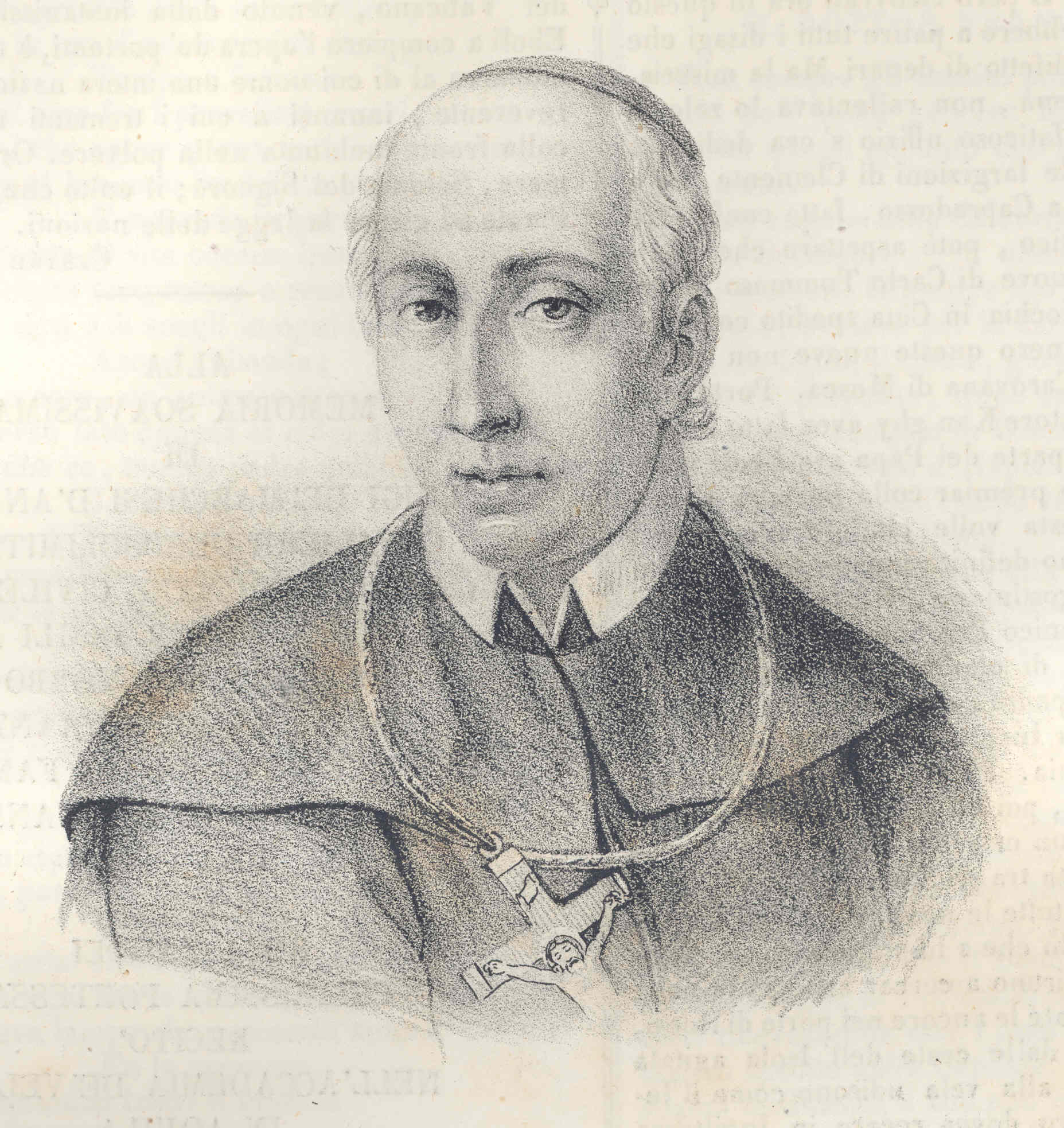
Anonymous portrait of Matteo Ripa

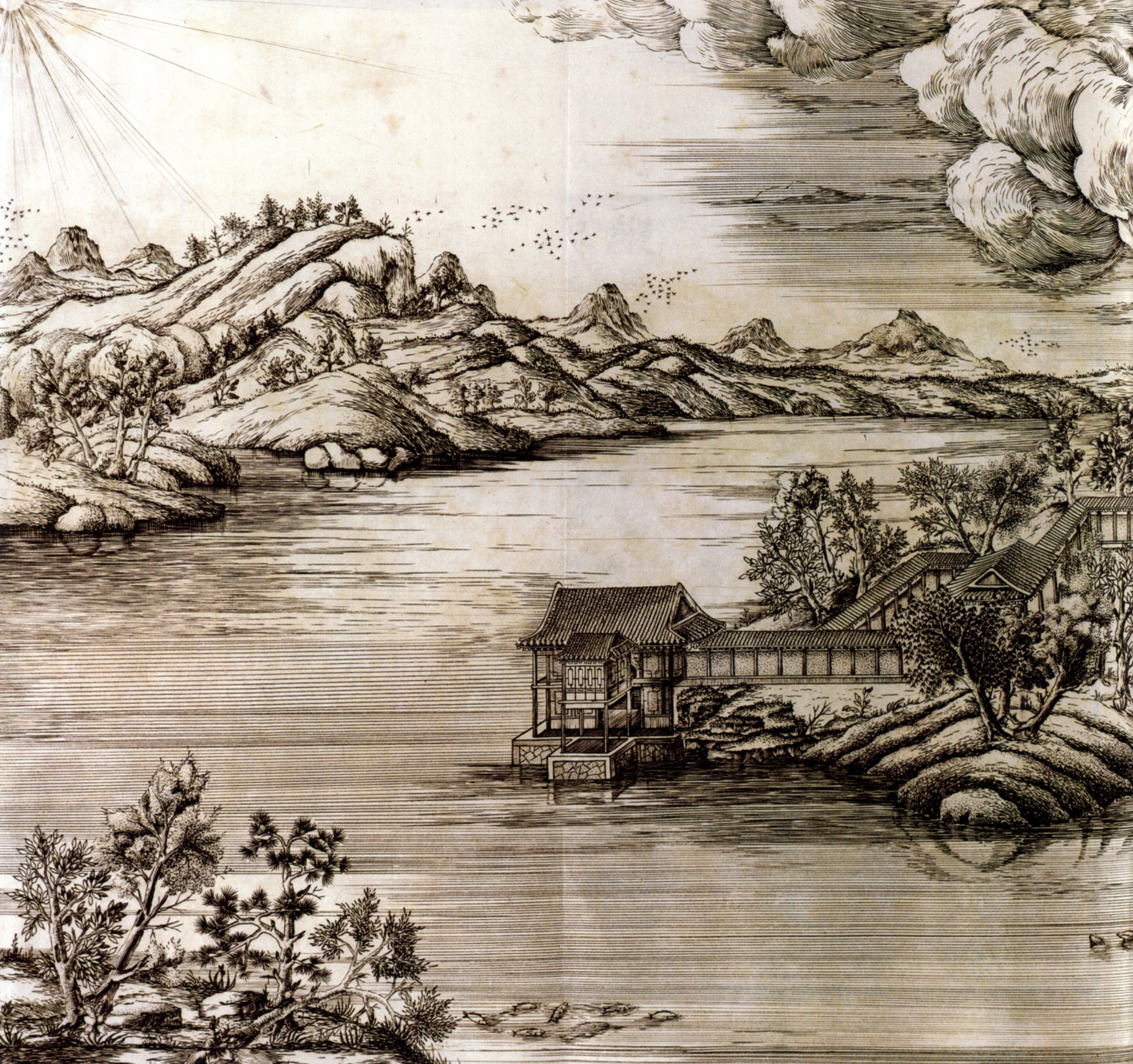
Morning Glow on the Western Ridge (西嶺晨霞); copperplate; (1711-1713) width 28 cm, height 45 cm. National Palace Museum, Taipei

Matteo Ripa (29 March 1682, Eboli – 29 March 1746, Naples) was an Italian priest who was sent as a missionary to China by Propaganda Fide, and between 1711 and 1723 worked as a painter and copper-engraver at the Manchu court of the Kangxi Emperor, under the Chinese name Ma Guoxian (馬國賢).

== Ripa's Chinese students ==
In December 1723 Matteo Ripa left Beijing for Europe, travelling with four youthly Chinese Christians (Giovanni Gu (ca. 1700-1763), Giovanni Yin (ca. 1704-1735), Philipo Huang (ca. 1711 - 1776), and Lucio Wu (ca. 1712 - 1763)) and their Chinese teacher. His plan was to bring the youths to Naples, train them as priests, and let them go back to China as missionaries. This was the foundation of the "Collegio dei Cinesi" ("Chinese College"), sanctioned by Pope Clement XII to help the propagation of Christianity in China. The Chinese College would then acquire different denominations throughout the centuries. Following the unification of Italy in 1861, the institution was transformed into the "Royal Asian College" and other languages such as Russian, Hindustani, and Persian were added to the curriculum. The foundation year and the historical continuity make the "Chinese College" (that since 2002 is known as "L'Orientale" University of Naples) the oldest school of Sinology and Oriental Studies of the European continent and the main university in Italy specialized in the study of non-European languages and cultures.

All six travellers reached Italy by the way of Canton and London, where George I of Great Britain received them at his palace in 1724. Setting up a Chinese College in Naples turned out to be harder than Ripa thought, but eventually, it was accomplished in 1732.

All four Ripa's Chinese seminarians were eventually ordained (Giovanni Gu and Giovanni Yin in 1734, Philipo Huang and Lucio Wu in 1741), but only three made it back to China.

Ripa several times severely punished Lucio Wu for insubordination, and eventually, in June 1744, Ripa asked Propaganda not to send the young priest to position in China because of his "immaturity". Devastated, Lucio soon fled the college and disappeared, until Ripa found him in the monastery of Monte Cassino the following spring. Subject to disciplinary punishments, he soon fled again. He was arrested in September 1745 in Senigallia, after travelling with forged priest's credentials throughout the Papal States, and occasionally celebrating a Mass at various churches. This time, Lucio was sentenced to a year of imprisonment in the Chinese College. But Ripa felt that this was not enough. In a letter dated March 29, 1746 - the day of his death - Ripa asked Propaganda for life imprisonment for the Chinese priest. The cardinals obliged, and Lucio was imprisoned in Rome's Castel Sant'Angelo. His pleas for pardon were rejected by Propaganda, especially as Ripa's successor at the Chinese College, Fr. Fatigati, supported Ripa's negative assessment of Lucio. The Chinese priest died in Italy in 1763.
