= Hartmut Fähndrich =

German scholar and translator

Hartmut Fähndrich (born 14 October 1944) is a German scholar and translator, specialising in translation of Arabic literature into German. He was born in Tübingen and studied at the universities of Tübingen, Münster, and UCLA. He obtained an MA in comparative literature and a PhD in Islamic studies from UCLA. In 1972, he moved to Switzerland where he has lived ever since. He has taught at the University of Bern and the Swiss Federal Institute of Technology in Zürich.

Fähndrich has translated more than 50 book-length works and numerous other shorter pieces. His first translated work was Wild Thorns (German title: Der Feigenkaktus) by Sahar Khalifeh in 1983. Since then he has translated books by many of the most important Arabic writers, from Naguib Mahfouz to Alaa al-Aswany. A partial list of these writers is provided below; the full list can be found here (PDF).

Fähndrich has received numerous awards for his work, including several from the city of Bern, one from the Arab League in 2004, from Egypt's Supreme Council of Culture in 2006, and the Saudi King Abdullah International Award for Translation in 2009, the world's richest translation prize. Of the Saudi award, Fähndrich said that only a fraction of the prize money he was supposed to have shared with an Arab colleague has arrived so far (as of October 2012), Fähndrich said "I feel I've been cheated". Fähndrich was also a member of the IPAF jury in 2008.

== Translated authors ==
- Abdel Hakim Qasem
- Abdelkader al-Janabi
- Abdelrahman Munif
- Alaa al-Aswany
- Azmi Bishara
- Edwar al-Kharrat
- Emile Habiby
- Emily Nasrallah
- Gamal al-Ghitani
- Ghassan Kanafani
- Hamida Naana
- Hanan al-Shaykh
- Hassan Daoud
- Hassan Nasr
- Ibrahim al-Koni
- Iman Humaydan-Yunus
- Khaled Ziadeh
- Latifa al-Zayyat
- May Telmissany
- Mohammad al-Bisatie
- Muhammad al-Machsangi
- Muhammad Mustagab
- Naguib Mahfouz
- Rashid al-Daif
- Sahar Khalifeh
- Salwa Bakr
- Sinan Antoon
- Sonallah Ibrahim
- Yahya Taher Abdullah
- Yusuf Idris
- Zakaria Tamer
