= Hammadi Sammoud =

Tunisian writers and academic

- Born: June 25, 1947 (age 78); Kelibia, Tunisia
- Education: Tunis University
- Occupations: Linguist; academic
- Awards: Sultan Bin Ali Al Owais Cultural Award (2017); Abu Al Qasim Al Shabi Award (2017)

Hammadi Hamida Sammoud (Arabic: حمادي صمود) (French: Hamadi Samoud) is a Tunisian academic, writer, historian, and linguist, who was born on June 25, 1946. He is also a member of the House of Wisdom Foundation.

== Early life ==
Sammoud was born in Kelibia, Tunisia. He studied the persistence of philosophy and classical literature. In 1972, he obtained a degree in Arabic language and literature from the college of arts and humanities in Tunisia, and in 1980, he received a PhD in the same major, his thesis was titled "Arabs’ Rhetorical Thinking: Its Principles and Development in the 6th Century". After studying at the New Sorbonne University Paris 3, the University of Paris 8 and the Lumière University Lyon 2, he worked as a professor at the faculty of arts and humanities in Manouba.

He was a professor from 1984 until 2008. He was a teacher at the Higher Institute of Linguistics, which offered classes in linguistics, language sciences and rhetoric to university professors. In addition, he participated in several scientific seminars in rhetoric, criticism and theories of literature. During his professional career, he supervised approximately 70 scientific research, 24 of which were doctoral theses.

On November 12, 2012, he was appointed a member of the House of Wisdom Foundation.

Sammoud received the “Literary Studies and Criticism” Award by Sultan Bin Ali Al Owais Cultural Foundation in recognition of his contribution to the field of contemporary Arabic criticism.

== Works ==
- Arabs’ Rhetorical Thinking: Its Principles and Development in the 6th Century (original: āltāfkyr ālʿrby ālblāġy: ōsosh w taṭwrh ēlā alqrn alsāds) (1981)
- Poetry and Heritage: Poetic Awareness of Heritage (original: Aš-Šiʻr wa-t-turāt̲: maʻnā al-Waʻī aš-Šiʻrī bi-t-turāt̲) (1986)
- The Front and Back: The Confluence of Heritage and Modernity (original: ālwāǧh walqafā: fi tlāzwm āltwrāṯ wālḥdāṯa) (1988)
- The Lexical and Poetic Theory of Arab Heritage Through Texts (co-authored with Abdul Salam Al Masdi and Abdul Qader Al Muhairi (original: Ān-nẓryā āl-lysānyā wš-šyʿryā fi āt-trāṯ ālʿrbi mn ẖilāl ān-nṣwṣ) (1988)
- Arabs and Literary Theories (original: Fī naẓarīyat al-adab ʻinda al-ʻArab) (1995)
- Pilgrims Most Important Theories on Western Culture from Aristotle Time to Today (original: Ahamm naẓarīyāt al-ḥujāj fī al-taqālīd al-Gharbīyah min Arisṭū ilá al-yawm) (1997)
- Manifestations of Rhetorical Discourse (original: Min tajallīyāt al-khiṭāb al-balāghī) (1999)
- Manifestations of Literary Discourse: Theoretical Issues (original: Min tajallīyāt al-khiṭāb al-adabī: qaḍayā naẓarīyah) (1999)
- Manifestations of Literary Discourse: Practical Issues (original: Min tajallīyāt al-khiṭāb al-adabī: qaḍayā taṭbīqīyah) (1999)
- The Epoch of Taha Hussein (co-authored with Muhammed Al Qadi, Abdullah Soula, Muhammed Barcelona and Muhammed Al-Hadi Al-Tarabulsi) (original: Miʼawīyat Ṭāhā Ḥusayn) (2000)
- Al-Jahiz on Rhetoric of Drama and the Issue of Literary Genres (original: Blāġt ālhāzl wmsālt Alaǧnās Aladabyā) (2002)
- The Eloquence of “Al-intisar” in Ancient Arab Criticism: Abu Bakr's Letter to Muzahim Ibn Fatik as a Model (original: Balāġat “al-intiṣār” fī al-naqd al-ʻArabī al-qadīm: risālat Abī Bakr al-Ṣūlī ilá Muzāḥim ibn Fātik unmūd̲aǧan) (2006)
- My Way towards Freedom (original: Ṭarīqī ilá al-ḥurrīyah) (2017)

== Awards ==
- State Award in Humanities (1994)
- Custodian of the Two Holy Mosques King Abdullah bin Abdulaziz International Award for Translation, The Translation Award in Humanities and Social Sciences, 2010 (Third Session)
- Custodian of the Two Holy Mosques King Abdullah bin Abdulaziz International Award for Translation, Translation from French, 2010 (Third Session) The award was for his translation of the book Dictionnaire D'Analyse Du Discours; a comprehensive encyclopedic work that includes all theories related to discourse analysis.
- Ibn Khaldoun-Senghor Translation Award by the Arab League Educational, Cultural and Scientific Organization (2011)
- Sultan Bin Ali Al Owais Cultural Award (2017)
- Abu Al Qasim Al Shabi Award (2017)
- The Order of Educational Merit
