= Roberto Tottoli =

Italian Arabist, Islamic studies scholar and professor

Roberto Tottoli is an Italian Arabist, Islamic studies scholar and professor. He is serving as the rector of the University of Naples “L'Orientale since November 2020.

== Biography ==
=== Education ===
Roberto Tottoli completed his bachelor's degree in Oriental languages and literatures at Ca' Foscari University in Venice and later earned a PhD from the University of Naples "L'Orientale. He studied from 1993 to 1994 at the Hebrew University of Jerusalem under the tutelage of M.J. Kister.

=== Career ===
Tottoli taught at the University of Turin from 1999 to 2002 and has been a faculty member at the University of Naples "L'Orientale since 2002. He became a full professor of Islamic studies in 2011 and took on the role of Rector in November 2020. He has held visiting positions at institutions such as Princeton, Harvard, the School for Advanced Studies in the Social Sciences, the Institute for Advanced Study in Tokyo, and the University of Pennsylvania. Additionally, he was a member of the Institute for Advanced Study in Princeton.

In 2019, he began serving as the principal investigator for the ERC-Synergy project EUQU—the European Qur'an, and he is a member of the Italian Academy of sciences.

== Works ==
As author

- The Qur’an: A Guidebook (2023)
- Studies in Islamic Traditions and Literature (2023)
- Islam: An Advanced Introduction (2020)
- Biblical Prophets in the Qur'an and Muslim Literature (2002)

As editor

- Routledge Handbook of Islam in the West, (2015) (ed.)
- The Wiley Blackwell History of Islam, (2018) (ed.)

As translator

- Malik, al-Muwatta (into Italian, for which he was awarded King Abdullah ibn Abdulaziz International Award)

== See also ==
- Massimo Campanini
