= The Literature, Publishing & Translation Commission (Saudi Arabia) =

Saudi Arabian governmental commission

- Types: Governmental Commission
- Location: Riyadh
- Country: Saudi Arabia
- Chairpersons: Mohammed Hasan Alwan
- Part of: Ministry Of Culture

The Literature, Publishing & Translation Commission (LPT; Arabic: هيئة الأدب والنشر والترجمة) is a governmental commission established in February 2020 based in Riyadh. The commission's main purpose is to systemize the publishing industry, develop a creative environment and create investment opportunities.

== History ==
In 2019, the minister of culture prince Badr bin Abdullah announced the establishment of 27 initiatives under 16 newly established authorities that the ministry of culture will take. The initiatives include the establishment of King Salman Global Arabic Language Complex, Nomow Cultural Fund, Culture Scholarship Program, improving public libraries, having the Red Sea International Film Festival and more.

== Initiatives ==
In 2021, LPTC held its first Translation Forum. Ever since, it was held annually to showcase the translation industry locally and internationally. It introduces the challenges and issues in the translation field, offers workshops and training, and exhibits experts from around the world to allow those interested in the field to network and connect with organizations and stakeholders.
