= Ayat al-Akhras =

Palestinian suicide bomber (1985–2002)

Ayat Al-Akhras
- Born: 20 February 1985; Dheisheh, Israeli-occupied West Bank
- Died: 29 March 2002 (aged 17); Jerusalem

Ayat al-Akhras (20 February 1985 – 29 March 2002) was the third and youngest Palestinian female suicide bomber who, at age 17, killed herself and two Israeli civilians on March 29, 2002, by detonating explosives belted to her body. The killings gained widespread international attention due to Ayat's age and gender and the fact that one of the victims was also a teenage girl.

Akhras was born in 1985 in the Deheishe Refugee Camp near Bethlehem, the Israeli-occupied West Bank. Her parents had fled or were expelled from Arab villages near Jaffa at the end of the 1948 Arab-Israeli War to settle in the Gaza Strip, and had moved from there to Bethlehem in the wake of the 1967 Six Day War. Her childhood experiences had likely radicalized her, leading her to join resistance organizations. During the 1987 First Intifada against the Israeli occupation, Akhras' oldest brother was jailed twice for attacking Israeli soldiers; and during the 2000 Second Intifada, members of her family were wounded and killed by the Israeli military. In 2002, a close friend and neighbor of Akhras that was playing with his toddler was hit by a stray bullet.

Akhras was a straight-A student and had hopes of attending college and becoming a news reporter. In 2001 she became engaged and plans were made for a wedding in July 2002. However, on 29 March 2002, Ayat al-Akhras was driven to the Kiryat HaYovel supermarket in Jerusalem by a recently recruited Tanzim member. Akhras detonated her explosives and killed two people: a 17-year-old Israeli girl named Rachel Levy and a 55-year-old security guard named Haim Smadar who had attempted to stop Akhras from entering the supermarket. In February 2014, Israel returned the remains of Ayat to her family as part of prisoner swaps, enabling them to arrange her funeral.

== Childhood and family background ==
Akhras was raised in the Deheishe Refugee Camp near Bethlehem, the Israeli-occupied West Bank, the daughter of Palestinian refugees who themselves grew up in a tent camp in the Gaza Strip. Her parents had fled or were expelled from Arab villages near Jaffa at the end of the 1948 Arab-Israeli War. After the 1967 Six Day War in which Israeli occupied Gaza, Akhras' parents migrated to the Dehaishe camp, described as "a maze of cinder-block buildings, refuse-strewn alleyways and open sewers". Akhras' father found employment with an Israeli construction firm and was able to build a three-story concrete house, where Akhras and her four brothers and six sisters were raised. Akhras was a straight-A student and had hopes of attending college and becoming a news reporter. In 2001 she became engaged and plans were made for a wedding in July 2002.

== Radicalization and preparation for violence ==
During the First Intifada against the Israeli occupation which started in 1987, Akhras' oldest brother was jailed twice for attacking Israeli soldiers. During the Second Intifada which started in 2000, members of her family were wounded and killed by the Israeli military. On 8 March 2002, a close friend and neighbor of Akhras that was playing with his toddler was hit by a stray bullet fired by Israeli troops as they were on a "counter-terrorism" operation.

These traumatic experiences may have influenced Akhras' attempts to join one of the Palestinian resistance groups. However, Israeli intelligence reports indicate that Akhras was impregnated by a Fatah operative, despite being an unmarried teenager, and that the emotional and social consequences of her unplanned pregnancy were the primary reason she decided to commit a suicide attack. Akhras first tried to join the ranks of Hamas, which turned her away because of a long-standing policy against allowing females to fight in physical combat. Hamas, which has claimed responsibility for many suicide bombings in Israel says that the basis for this rule lies in teachings of the Qur'an that says Jihad is the domain of the male. Despite this, Hamas and the Palestine Islamic Jihad (which generally also only recruits males) have since each used female suicide bombers. In 2002, the spiritual leader of Hamas, Sheik Ahmed Yassin made a statement to the press after Akhras' bombing saying that the group would only use women after they ran out of men.

However, Akhras found a group that would accept her: the Al-Aqsa Martyrs' Brigades, a group linked to the armed branch of Fatah (Yasser Arafat's party), more secular than Hamas. The group already had experience, using at least three other women successfully in suicide bombings against Israel before Akhras. She was reportedly trained for several weeks before being sent to Kiryat Yovel, a south-western neighborhood of Jerusalem, to detonate in the supermarket. Before her attack, Akhras, like many other Palestinian suicide bombers, made a video in which she lashed out at the regimes and militaries of Muslim nations throughout the world. She said: "I say to the Arab leaders, stop sleeping. Stop failing to fulfill your duty. Shame on the Arab armies who are sitting and watching the girls of Palestine fight while they are asleep."

== Bombing and victims ==
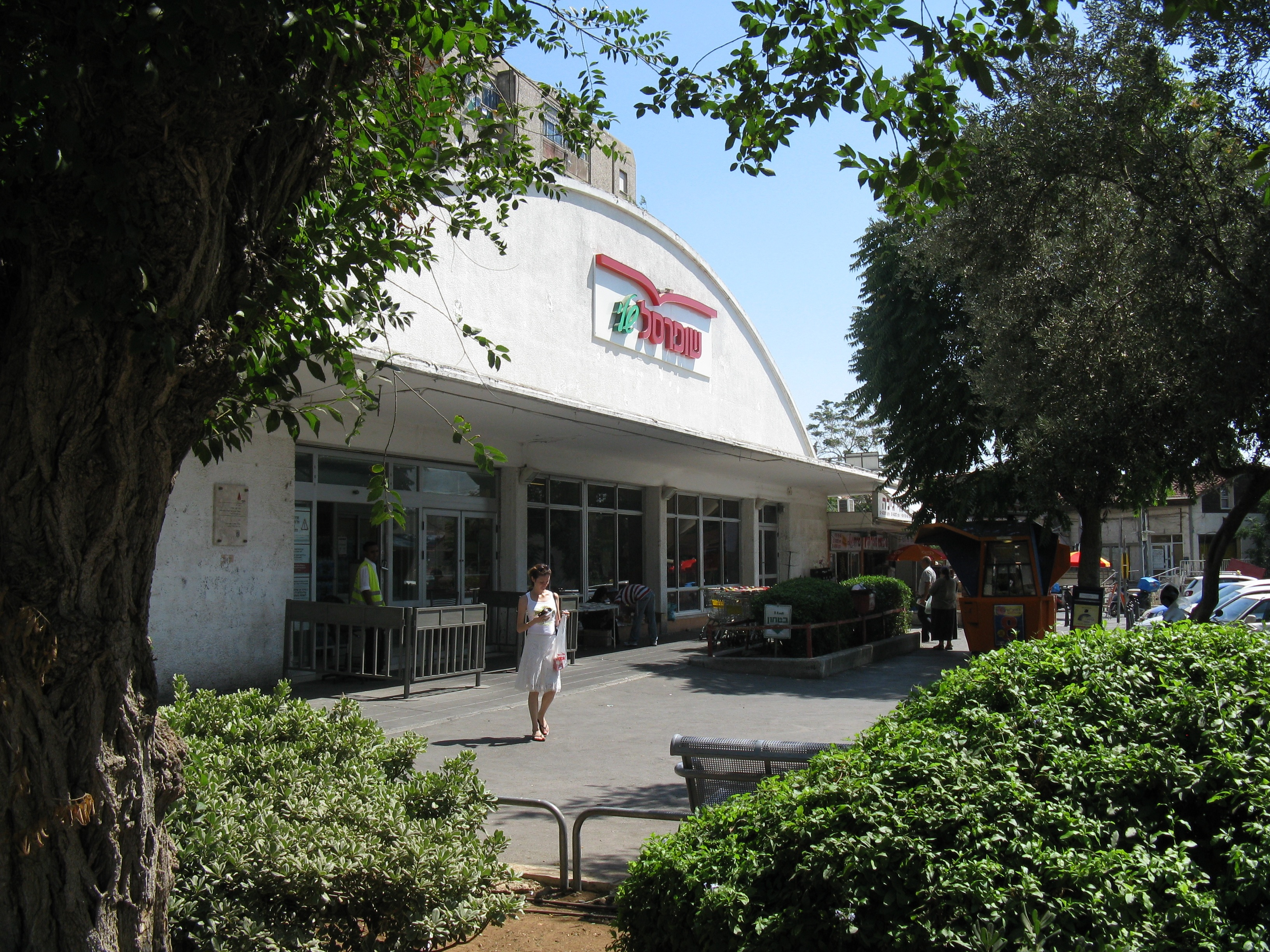
The entrance to the Kiryat HaYovel supermarket, where Akhras detonated the bomb and killed 2.

On 29 March 2002, Ayat al-Akhras was driven to the Kiryat HaYovel supermarket in Jerusalem by the recently recruited Tanzim member Ibrahim Sarahne, who had once worked in the supermarket. The neighborhood is home to a mostly young population, young couples, students at the Ein Kerem medical campus of the Hebrew University of Jerusalem, professors and teachers. The two crossed an Israeli checkpoint with the bomb in a bag on the car floor at Akhras' feet.

In the aftermath of the bombing, Sarahne said that during the drive he suggested that he just throw the bomb, which would allow her to return home. Yet, she replied 'I'm not afraid. I want to kill people.' Akhras detonated her explosives and killed two people: a 17-year-old Israeli girl named Rachel Levy and a 55-year-old security guard named Haim Smadar who had attempted to stop Akhras from entering the supermarket. Smadar, who spoke Arabic, became suspicious after two Arabic women who usually sold vegetables outside the shop entrance were told by Akhras to leave. Smadar's actions saved the lives of many, as Akhras would otherwise have exploded the device inside the supermarket.

In February 2014, Israel returned the remains of Ayat to her family as part of prisoner swaps, enabling them to arrange her funeral.

== Reactions ==
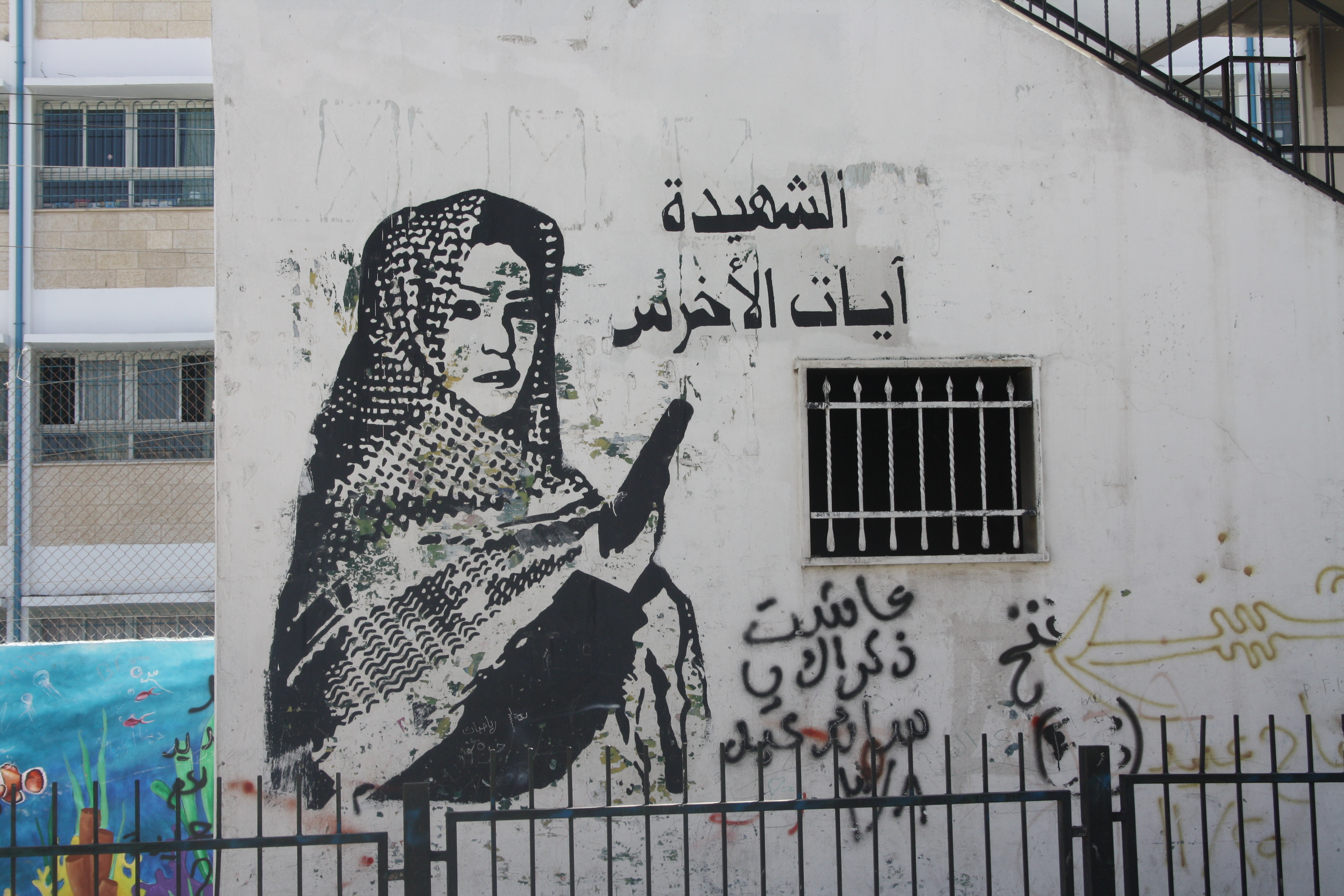
Mural of Ayat al-Akhras at a girls' school in Dheisheh

The Al-Asqa Martyrs Brigade claimed responsibility in the press for the attack which the Israeli government denounced as an act of terrorism. The killings led the U.S. President George W. Bush to observe: “When an 18-year-old Palestinian girl is induced to blow herself up and in the process kills a 17-year-old Israeli girl, the future itself is dying, the future of the Palestinian people and the future of the Israeli people”. The European Union condemned "firmly" the terror attack. The Saudi Ambassador to the UK, Ghazi Abdul Rahman Algosaibi - a scholar and top politician in Saudi Arabia, wrote a poem in praise of al-Akhras, for which he was criticized by the UK and US governments, and among some Palestinians and Islamic militants, Akhras became a martyr (hero) figure, but the reaction among Akhras' family was mixed.

According to Newsweek, Akhras' fiancé did not approve of violence and would have stopped her if he had known her plan. "May God forgive her for what she has done," he reportedly said. Other members of Akhras' family, which were educated and moderate, condemned suicide bombings as morally wrong. However, they said that Israeli "brutality" had left Palestinians no other choice.

== Novel ==
Prima di Lasciarsi (Before We Say Goodbye) by Gabriella Ambrosio is a novel based on Ayat al-Akras' story, published in Italy in 2004 by Nutrimenti and was awarded at the Festival du Premier Romance in Chambéry, France. In 2008 the book's publication in both in Arabic and Hebrew was sponsored by Amnesty International and employed by Israeli colleges and human rights organizations working in Israel and the Palestinian Territories as an educational tool. It has then been published in the UK, Australia, and in New Zealand by Walker Books, in France as "Deuze Heures Avant"(Gallimard), in Germany as "Der Himmel uber Jerusalem" (Fischer Verlag) as well as in Spain (Noguer), Turkey (Remzi Kitabevi), Greece (Psichogios), Korea (JoongAng) and China (Jieli publishing house). It is studied in universities in UK and Canada as an example of human rights literature.

== Documentary ==
Rachel Levy and Ayat al-Akhras in the film To Die in Jerusalem

To Die in Jerusalem is a 2007 HBO documentary film about Ayat al-Akhras and her 17-year-old Israeli victim, Rachel Levy. The film documents the efforts of Rachel's mother Avigail Levy to meet with Um Samir al-Akhras, the mother of al-Akhras. Um Samir al-Akhras refused to denounce her daughter's action.

== See also ==
- Suicide bomber
- Female suicide bomber
- Second Intifada
- Andalib Suleiman, 17-year-old female perpetrator of a 2002 Jerusalem marketplace suicide bombing
