= King Abdullah bin Abdulaziz International Award for Translation =

King Abdullah bin Abdulaziz International Award for Translation (previously Custodian of the Two Holy Mosques King Abdullah bin Abdulaziz International Award for Translation (2008-2014)) is a Saudi international literary award for the translation of works to/from Arabic. The Chairman of the award is Prince Abdulaziz bin Abdullah. The award is located in King Abdul Aziz Public Library in Riyadh, Saudi Arabia. It was established on 31 October 2006 upon the approval of the King Abdulaziz Public Library Council. The vision of the award is "to promote cultural exchange among peoples of the world and to advance intellectual interaction among civilizations." The first award was presented in 2008 for works published in 2007.

The shared prize of $1 million was called the richest translation award in the world. Prizes of $200,000 each are awarded in four categories for translations in the fields of the humanities, religion, literature and natural sciences, into and out of Arabic, with a fifth special prize for institutions that promote translation.

Little information about the prize is known, such as how it is administered, who is in contention, why the winners were chosen, what expectations there are of the winners.

The 2009 ceremony was held in Casablanca. One of the 2009 winners, Hartmut Fähndrich, said that (as of October 2012) only a fraction of the prize money he was supposed to have shared with an Arab colleague has arrived so far. Fähndrich said "I feel I've been cheated". The 2011 ceremony was held in Beijing, attended by Prince Abdulaziz bin Abdullah, Chinese Minister of Culture Cai Wu, Saudi Ambassador to China Yahya Al-Zaid. The 2012 ceremony was held in Berlin, attended by Prince Abdulaziz bin Abdullah and the Mayor of Berlin Klaus Wowereit. It was a private ceremony by invitation only. The 2013 ceremony was held at the library in Riyadh.

== Winners ==
2008 (First Session)

- The Translation Award for Institutions: King Fahd Complex
- The Translation Award in Humanities and Social Sciences: Abdulsalam Al-Shaddad; Claudia M.Tresso; Salih Sadawi Salih
- The Translation Award in Natural Sciences: Abdullah Ibrahim Al-Muhaidib; Ahmad Fouad Basha; Hatim Al-Najdy

2009 (Second Session)

- Abdullah bin Abdulaziz International Award for Translation: Salma Al-Khadra Al-Jayyusi; Hartmut Fähndrich
- The Translation Award for Institutions: Translation Center at the University of King Saud
- The Translation Award in Humanities and Social Sciences: Choi Yuong Ki; Fayez Al-Suyaá; Bander Ibn Nasser Al-Otaibi
- The Translation Award in Natural Sciences: Hatim Al-Najdy

2010 (Third Session)

- The Translation Award for Institutions: The General Egyptian Book Organization (GEBO)
- The Translation Award in Humanities and Social Sciences: Mohammad Al Kholi; Hammadi Sammoud
- The Translation Award in the Natural Sciences: Essam Elgamal; Sherif Elwatidy; Abdullah Al-Kahtani; Ahmad Al-Owais; Naser M. Alandis;
- Translation from French: Abdelkader Mhiri & Hamadi Sammoud
- Honorees: André Miquel; Abdul Wahid Lu'lu'a

2011 (Fourth Session)

- The Translation Award for Institutions: Arabic Organization for Translation (AOT)
- The Translation Award in Humanities and Social Sciences: Muhammad Badawi; George Zeenati; Franz Chop; Hussein Bin Sheenah
- The Translation Award in the Natural Sciences: Muhammad Bin Abdullah Alzughaibi; Abdullah Bin Ali Alghasham; Yusuf Ahmed Barakat;
- Honorees: Chong Jee Kong; Muhammad Enani

2012 (Fifth Session)

- The Translation Award for Institutions: Kalima Project for Translation
- The Translation Award in Humanities and Social Sciences: Moheiddin Ali Homeidi; Fadhel Jektr; Five translators for their work on As-Sirah an-Nabawiyyah ("The Biography of Prophet Mohammad peace be upon him") of Ibn Hisham from Arabic into Uzbek; Nabeel Radwan
- The Translation Award in the Natural Sciences: Mohammad Salama Al Harahsh; Waleed Mohammad Khalifa; Elsaid Mohammad Al Elfi;
- Honorees: Shukri Mabkhout; Mona Baker; Anna Dolinina; Thirteen translators of the work Encyclopedic Dictionary of Pragmatics “Dictionnaire Encyclopédique de Pragmatique” by Jacques Moeschler and Anne Reboul from French into Arabic.

2013 (Sixth Session)

- The Translation Award for Institutions: Arab Center for Arabization, Translation, Authorship and Publication
- The Translation Award in Humanities and Social Sciences: Salwa Saliman Naqli; Rasha Saad Zaki; Cecilia Martini Bonadeo
- The Translation Award in the Natural Sciences: Reem Mohammad Al Towairqi; Abdulanser Salah Ibrahim and Ali Abdullah Al-Salama
- The Translation Award for Efforts in Translation: Joao Baptista de Medeiros Vargens; Luis Miguel Perez

2014 (Seventh Session)

- The Translation Award for Institutions: The National Translation Center, Egypt; The Tunisian Academy for Science, Arts, and Literature
- The Translation Award in Humanities and Social Sciences: Mustafa Mohammad Qassim; Bassam Baraka; Abdulaziz A. Al Boraithen
- The Translation Award in the Natural Sciences: Marwan Jabr and Hassan Salman Layqah; Saleem Masoudi, Abdulsalam Yaghfori, and Samia Shalaalfor; Saleh D Al Onazi; Peter Adamson and Peter E. Pormann
- The Translation Award for Individual Effort: ZHU Weilie; Hannelore Lee-Jahnke

2015 (Eighth Session)

- The Translation Award for Institutions: Toledo School of Translations, University of Castilla-La Mancha
- The Translation Award in Humanities from Arabic into Other Languages: Mohammed Abattouy; Salim Al Hassani; Roberto Tottoli
- Translation Award in the Humanities from Other Languages into Arabic: Hend Suliaman Al-Khalifa; Abdulaziz Meteib Al-Rasheed; Emad Al-Hadi Al-Maziyoub; Lotfi Amer Jededeih; Ibrahim Al-Sehebani
- Translation in the Natural Sciences from Other Languages into Arabic: Al-Sayed Ahmad; Fahd Dakheel Al-Osaimi
- The Translation Award for Individual Effort: Saleh Almani; Mathieu Guidere

== See also ==
- Sheikh Hamad Award for Translation and International Understanding
