= University of Naples "L'Orientale" =

University in Naples, Italy

Coordinates: 40.845°N 14.255°E

- Università degli Studi di Napoli "L'Orientale"
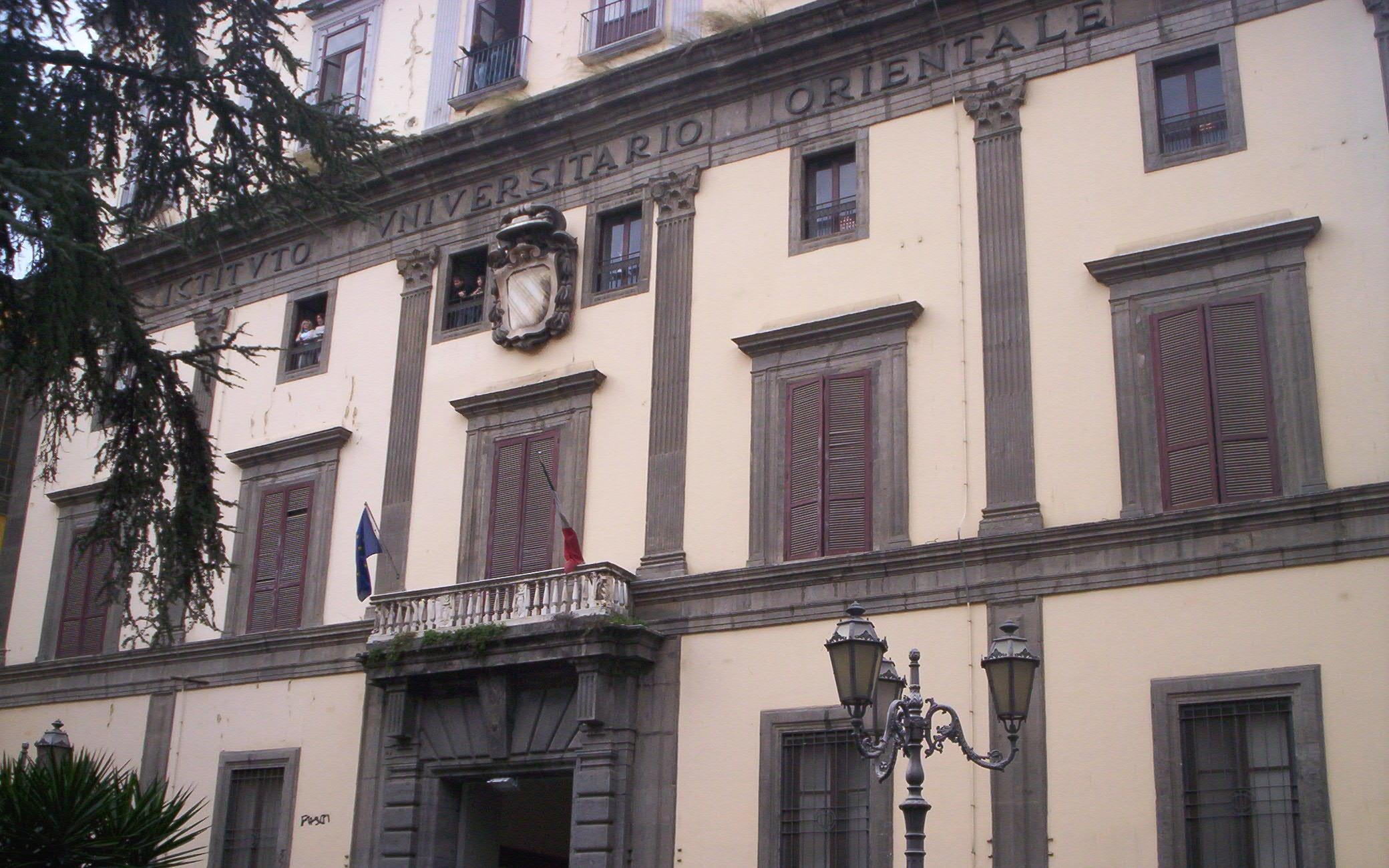
- Type: Public
- Established: 1732; 294 years ago
- Rector: Roberto Tottoli
- Students: 11,164 (2017)
- Location: Naples, Italy
- Sports teams: CUS Napoli
- Website: www.unior.it

The University of Naples "L'Orientale" (Italian: Università degli Studi di Napoli "L'Orientale") is a university located in Naples, Italy. Founded in 1732 by Matteo Ripa, it is the oldest school of Sinology and Oriental Studies of the European continent. It is organized in three departments, and is the main university in Italy specializing in the study of non-European languages and cultures, with research and studies agreements with universities all over the world. It is one of the top universities in the world regarding Asian cultures and languages.

== History ==
=== Foundation ===

The name "L'Orientale" is an indication of the origins of the university. In the mid-17th century, the Manchus established the Qing Empire in China and started a remarkable period of openness towards the west. This included welcoming Christian missionaries and priests. One such person was the missionary Matteo Ripa of the Propaganda Fide from the Kingdom of Naples, who worked as a painter and copper engraver at the imperial court of the Kangxi Emperor between 1711 and 1723. He returned to Naples from China with four young Chinese Christians, all teachers of their native language; they formed the nucleus of what would become the "Chinese College" (Collegio de' Cinesi) of Naples, sanctioned by Pope Clement XII in 1732 to teach Chinese to missionaries and thus advance the propagation of Christianity in China.

The school buildings comprised the Complesso dei Cinesi located at the boundary of Capodimonte and the Rione Sanità. What was formerly a private palace had been converted into a monastery and a church dedicated to Saint Frances of Rome. Under Matteo Ripa, the complex became a seminary for missionaries to China. In addition to being a school for Chinese priests, in some occasions the Chinese College also welcomed Europeans who were interested in learning the Chinese language. This played a crucial role in spreading knowledge about Chinese language and culture in the Western world.

=== Transformations since the 19th-century ===
After the unification of Italy in 1861, the institution was transformed into the "Royal Asian College" (Real collegio asiatico) and other languages such as Russian, Hindustani, and Persian were added to the curriculum. The original buildings also were used as a school for orphans in 1897, and in 1910 into the Elena d'Aosta hospital.

The institution then became a secular school for the study of eastern languages in general, and then, over the course of decades, African languages and, indeed, all modern European languages. Today more than 50 languages are taught.

== Campus ==
The main entrance to the institute has a frescoed coat of arms of the institute with a half bust of Matteo Ripa sculpted by Leonardo Di Candia.

The domed church of the Holy Family of the Chinese (Sacra Famiglia dei Cinesi) was built in 1732, and refurbished in 1814. The single nave leads to a main altar with marble cherubs sculpted by Angelo Viva. The main altarpiece depicting a Holy Family adored by two of the first Chinese Seminarians (1769) was painted by Antonio Sarnelli. Other paintings were by followers or pupils of Francesco De Mura, including his brother Gennaro. Four saints carved in wood were designed by Francesco Solimena. The Madonna della Misericordia was painted by Stanislao Lista. The sacristy has sculptures by Giuseppe Sammartino.

== Institutions ==
in 1932 l'Orientale moved into its current headquarters, Palazzo Giusso. However, like most universities in Italy, the IUO lacks a single main campus and is distributed over the city at a number of different sites. The teaching facilities of L'Orientale include Palazzo Giusso and Palazzo Corigliano in the historic center of Naples, the large converted monastery of Santa Maria Porta Coeli near the Naples Cathedral, and the new Palazzo Mediterraneo on via Marina.

There are three Departments:

- Asia, Africa e Mediterraneo
- Scienze umane e sociali
- Studi letterari, linguistici e comparati.

Main Library is Maurizio Taddei, Palazzo Corigliano, with over 60.000 ancient volumes.

== Notable alumni ==
- Mario Paciolla - journalist and activist
- Gotami Theri, Buddhist nun and writer

== See also ==
- List of Italian universities
