= Nasser Almanqour =

Saudi Arabian diplomat

Nasser Al-Manqour
- ناصر المنقور

Personal details
- Born: April 1930 Sudair, Kingdom of Hejaz and Nejd
- Died: 24 July 2007 (aged 77) London, England

Nasser bin Hamad Al-Manqour (April 1930–24 July 2007) was a Saudi politician and diplomat who held several positions, including director of King Saud University and minister of labor and social affairs. Al-Manqour was also served the ambassador of Saudi Arabia to Spain, the United Kingdom, Ireland, and Sweden.

== Biography ==
Nasser Al-Manqour was born in April 1930 in Sudair of Saudi Arabia. he completed his education in Mecca and did graduating from the Cairo University with honours in literature. Al-Manqour served as Ambassador to Japan, Sweden, and Spain and United Kingdom.

He began his career at the Ministry of Foreign Affairs. He became director-general of Education in 1956 and was appointed director of the University of Riyadh in 1958.

Al-Manqour died in a hospital in London on July 24, 2007, after a struggle with illness.

== Bibliography ==
- Al-Saif, Muhammad (2019). Nasser Almanqour: A Life in Education Politics and Diplomacy in Saudi Arabia. Riyadh: Jadawel for Publishing.
