= Kiryat HaYovel supermarket bombing =

2002 suicide bombing in Jerusalem

- Part of the Second Intifada militancy campaign
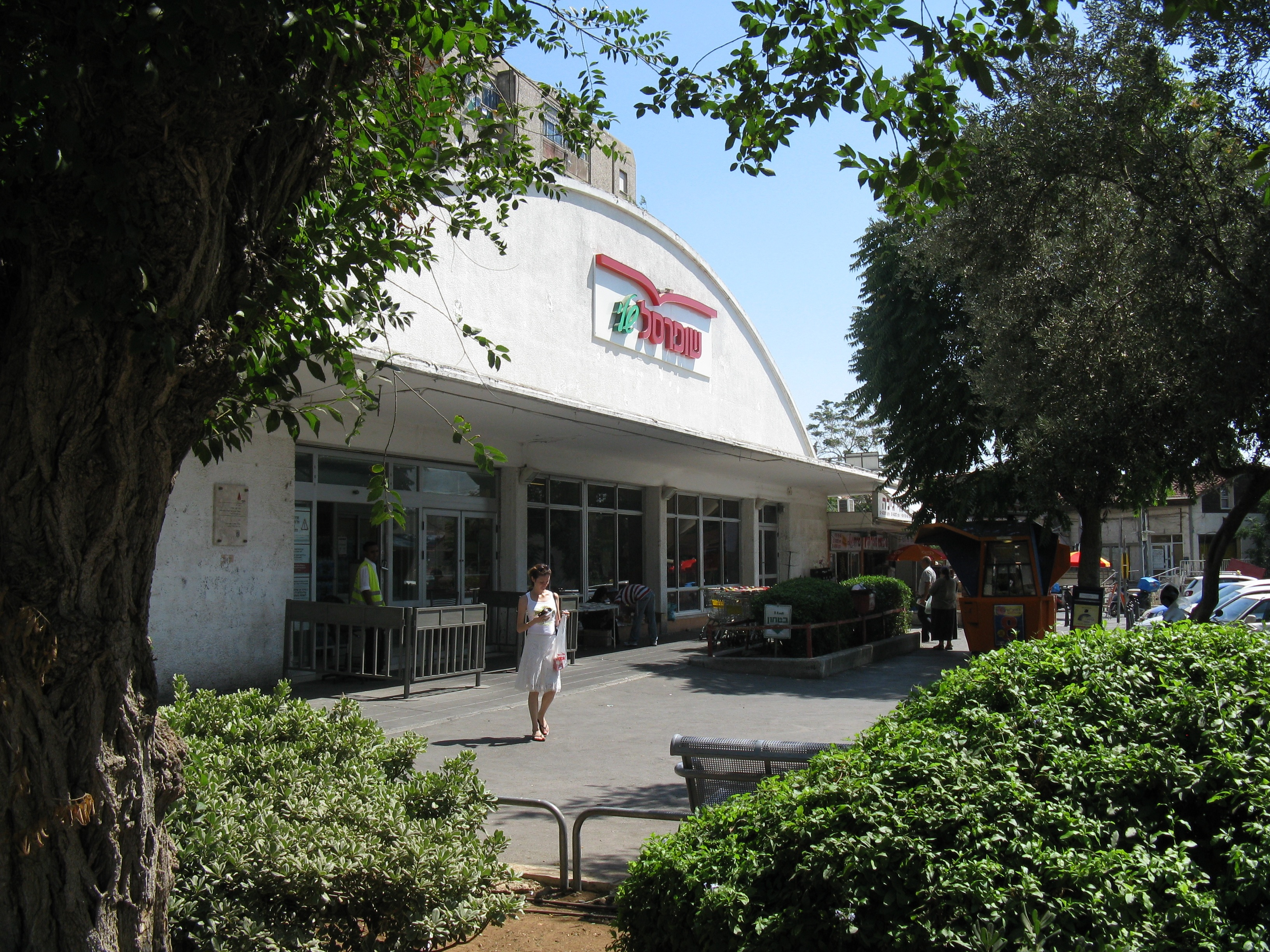
- The attack site, 2009

- The attack site Kiryat HaYovel supermarket bombing (Jerusalem District) Kiryat HaYovel supermarket bombing (Israel)
- Location: 31°45′42″N 35°10′30″E; Shufersal supermarket at the Kiryat HaYovel neighbourhood in Jerusalem
- Date: 29 March 2002; 24 years ago
- Attack type: Suicide bombing
- Weapon: Suicide vest
- Deaths: 2 Israeli civilians (+1 bomber)
- Injuries: 28 civilians
- Perpetrator: Ayat al-Akhras (Hamas claimed responsibility)

A suicide bombing was carried out on 29 March 2002 by 17-year-old Ayat al-Akhras, who blew herself up at the entrance of the main supermarket in the Jerusalem neighborhood of Kiryat HaYovel, killing three people including a 17 year old girl and injuring 28, two seriously. Hamas claimed responsibility for the attack.

== The attack ==
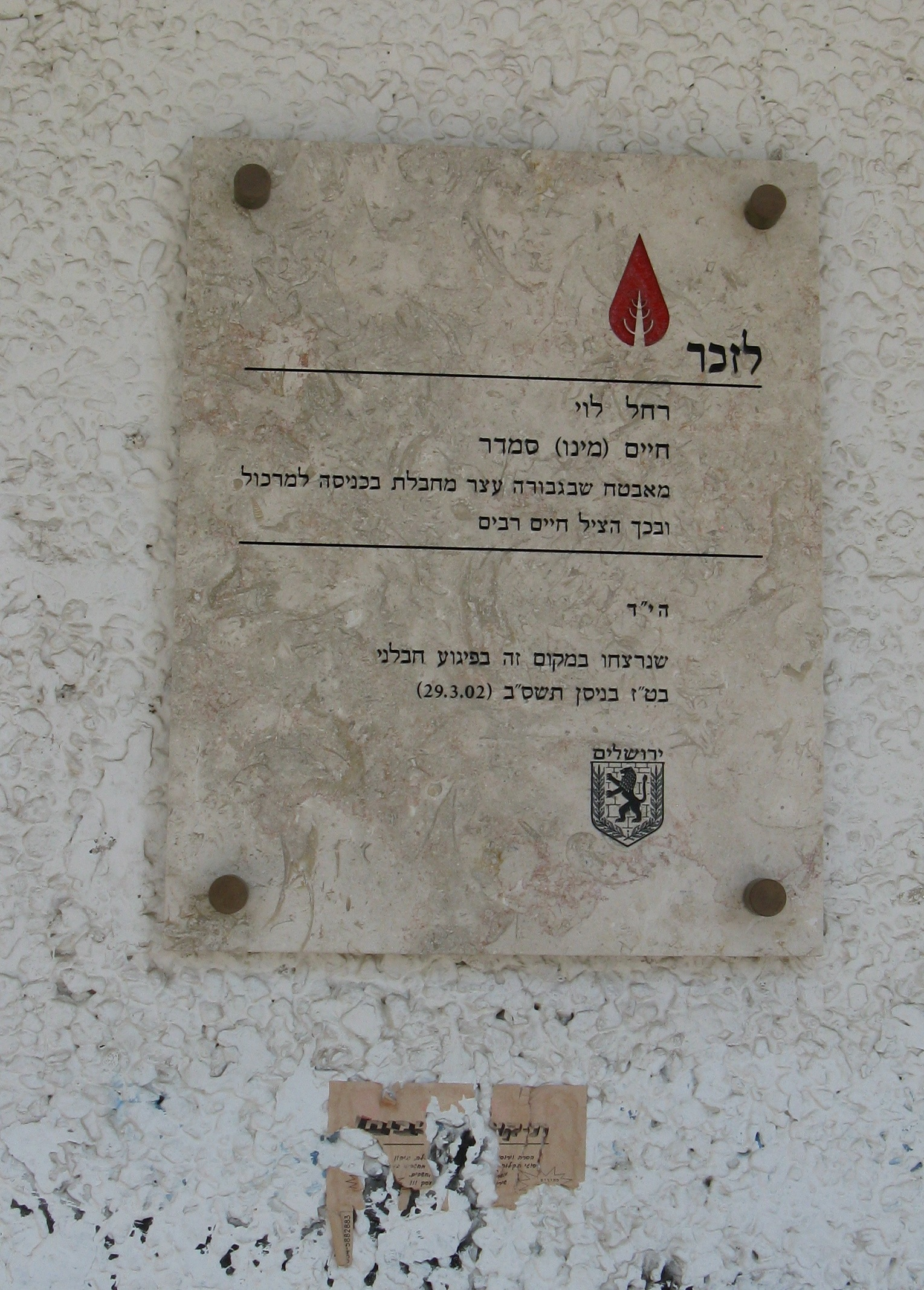
Haim Smadar Memorial Plaque at Kiryat HaYovel supermarket

On 29 March 2002, during the afternoon, Ayat al-Akhras, an 17-year-old Palestinian girl, approached the Shufersal supermarket of Kiryat Yovel. The supermarket at the time was full of customers shopping for the weekend.

Haim Smadar, the 55-year-old security guard who guarded the entrance to the supermarket and spoke Arabic, became suspicious after two Arab women who usually sold vegetables outside the shop entrance had been warned by Akhras to leave. Akhras detonated the explosives at the entrance to the store while struggling with Smadar, killing him and Rachel Levy, a 17-year-old Israeli girl. In addition, about 30 people were injured in the attack. Smadar managed to forcefully keep her away from the crowd, thus preventing a larger loss of life had the attack taken place inside the store.

After the attack, it was discovered that the suicide bomber was also carrying an unexploded mortar bomb.

When news of the bombing reached Dheisheh, some of the residents celebrated, handing out candies and firing guns in the air.

== The perpetrator ==
Hamas claimed responsibility for the attack and identified the suicide bomber as 17-year-old Ayat al-Akhras from the Deheishe Refugee Camp near Bethlehem.

== Official reactions ==
US president George W. Bush condemned the attack, stating: "When an 18-year-old Palestinian girl is induced to blow herself up, and in the process kills a 17-year-old Israeli girl, the future itself is dying, the future of the Palestinian people and the future of the Israeli people." He also called on Yasser Arafat to convey a clear message to terrorists that blowing themselves up did not help the cause of the Palestinians.

== Aftermath ==
After the bombing, Ayat became an icon in Bethlehem and was hailed as a martyr and role model at Al Quds University. She was praised by American university professor Julio Pino.

Then Saudi Ambassador to the UK, Dr Ghazi Abdul Rahman Al Gosaibi, a leading politician in Saudi Arabia, wrote a poem in praise of al-Akhras in 2002.
