= Petrofiction =

Genre of fiction focused on the role of petroleum oil in society

Petrofiction or oil fiction is a genre of fiction focused on the role of petroleum in society.

== Background ==
The concept was first developed by Amitav Ghosh to classify literature about the petroleum industry and the impact of oil on society. He coined the term when reviewing Abdul Rahman Munif's Cities of Salt in 1992. When describing the concept, he noticed an absence of literature exploring the role of "oil encounters" between countries that extract oil and those that consume. Imre Szeman in a 2012 editorial introduction to a special edition of the American Book Review proposed a slightly larger scope: all works that explore "the important role played by oil in contemporary society."

Works of petrofiction proliferated in the 2000s and 2010s, along with a growing critical focus, as a result of concerns about climate change and peak oil. Since its inauguration the term has been widely used in literary criticism to explore fiction which evaluates society's dominance by a petroleum economy and a related culture shaped by petroleum. Most critics were trying to find works that focused on the oil industry before Cities of Salt. This genre has been particularly important in non-Western literature, exploring how encounters with oil are entangled with other issues in the Global South.

Some critics have connected the role of petrofiction to the emergence of climate fiction, in that both are evaluating and addressing the concerns brought on by the Anthropocene.

== Notable examples ==
- Petroleum, Petroleum (1903) by Gustav Meyrink
- Oil! (1926–27) by Upton Sinclair
- Greenvoe (1972) by George Mackay Brown
- Rabbit Is Rich (1981) by John Updike
- Cities of Salt (1984) by Abdul Rahman Munif
- Through the Arc of the Rain Forest (1990) by Karen Tei Yamashita
- Petrolio (1992) by Pier Paolo Pasolini
- Tropic of Orange (1997) by Karen Tei Yamashita
- GraceLand (2004) by Chris Abani
- Things We Didn't See Coming (2008) by Steven Amsterdam
- Cyclonopedia: Complicity with Anonymous Materials (2008) by Reza Negarestani
- Oil on Water (2010) by Helon Habila
- World Made by Hand (2008) by James Howard Kunstler
- Oil People (2024) by David Huebert
