= I Hotel (novel) =

2010 novel by Karen Tei Yamashita

- Author: Karen Tei Yamashita
- Genre: Literary fiction, historical fiction
- Publisher: Coffee House Press
- Publication date: June 1, 2010
- Pages: 640
- ISBN: 978-1566892391
- Preceded by: Circle K Cycles
- Followed by: Anime Wong: Fictions of Performance

I Hotel is a 2010 novel by Japanese American writer Karen Tei Yamashita, published by Coffee House Press. A novel about Asian American movements in the seventies, it is named after the International Hotel, a historic residential hotel in San Francisco that housed predominantly Filipino Americans in the 20th century, which is the setting for several of the book's sections. The book won several awards, including an American Book Award. It was reissued by Coffee House Press for its tenth anniversary in 2019, featuring an introduction by Jessica Hagedorn.

== Content and structure ==
The novel is divided into 10 linked novellas, each taking place in consecutive years. The first novella takes place in 1968, the year of the Third World Liberation Front strikes. The tenth and last novella takes place in 1977, the year that the International Hotel was demolished. Centered around the Asian American movement in the sixties and seventies, the novel makes reference to historical events such as the Tet Offensive, the assassination of Martin Luther King Jr., and Henry Kissinger's visit to China in 1971, as well as historical groups like the Black Panther Party and the United Farm Workers.

Through the novellas, Yamashita tells the story of different characters all with different personal perspectives. The characters range from different Asian Americans, activists and revolutionaries, to different generations of people. The stories reflect how the I-Hotel was not only a literal, physical place for refuge and everyday existence, but became a symbolic beacon of transnational and intergenerational community gathering, hope, and activism.

In the novel's afterword, Yamashita wrote that the book initially began with conversations with over 150 people involved in or closely related to the Asian American movement, as well as countless hours spent in archives. However, she realized that she was getting caught up in historical research, prompting her to attempt to write it. Altogether, Yamashita spent nearly a decade conceptualizing and writing the novel. Eight years in, she felt a need to physically construct the International Hotel for herself, but plans to learn AutoCAD from her architect husband never materialized. Instead, Yamashita used pieces of cardboard to construct ten cubes, dedicating each one to a year between 1968 and 1977; she used each cube's faces to record information such as historical events, locations, themes, characters, and other setting details. Through this, the structure of her novel began to finally emerge. A diagram of the unfolded cubes and their inscribed faces is shown in the first few pages of the book.

== Critical reception ==
Kirkus Reviews said "With delightful plays of voice and structure, this is literary fiction at an adventurous, experimental high point." Publishers Weekly gave the book a starred review, stating that "Though it isn't for everyone, this powerful, deeply felt, and impeccably researched fiction is irresistibly evocative and overwhelming in every sense."

The Nation wrote that "I Hotel's power is derived precisely from Yamashita’s deliberate embrace of everything all at once, the collapse of the fictional with the historical, her insistence on making visible the threads that tie these stories of American dispossession together." Sadie Stein, in The New York Times, called it "ambitious, sweeping, virtuosic, kaleidoscopic", "certainly the Great San Francisco Novel". Meanwhile, a critic in The Chicago Tribune called it the "single most ambitious and experimental work of fiction I have read in a long, long time" but lamented that it was "a glorious failure of a book" by fault of its slowness and structure.

Writing about the novel for its tenth anniversary in The Paris Review, Hagedorn called the novel "polyphonic", with similarities to novels such as Hopscotch by Julio Cortázar or Cosmicomics by Italo Calvino. Vanessa Hua, in a review of the novel for SFGATE, speculated on the real-life bases for several of the characters, such as Mo Akagi representing Black Panther Richard Aoki, Edmund Yat Min Lee representing activist Ling-Chi Wang, and Arthur Hama representing mural artist Takeo "Edward" Terada.

== Awards ==
- American Book Award
- Asian/Pacific American Award for Literature, Adult Fiction
- Association for Asian American Studies Book Award, Poetry/Prose
- California Book Award, Gold Medal for Fiction
- National Book Award for Fiction, Finalist
