= Peter Theroux =

American writer and translator

Peter Christopher Sebastian Theroux (born 1956) is an American translator and writer. The younger brother of writers Alexander Theroux and Paul Theroux, during college Peter studied for a year at the University of Cairo. He became interested in Arabic literature and has made it his life's work. He has translated numerous works of both historic and chiefly contemporary fiction by Egyptian, Iraqi and Lebanese authors. In addition, he has written articles and published a travel book, Sandstorms (1990), about his extensive travels in the Middle East.

== Early life and education ==
Theroux was born in 1956 in Boston, Massachusetts, the youngest son of Catholic parents; his mother, Anne (née Dittami), was Italian American, and his father, Albert Eugene Theroux, was French Canadian. His mother was a grammar school teacher and his father was a salesman for the American Oak Leather company. His two older brothers, Alexander (b. 1938) and Paul (b. 1941), both became writers. Peter also became interested in literature, travel, and writing.

In a 1978 profile of the Theroux family, James Atlas wrote that then 21-year-old Peter “had completed five (unpublished) novels by the time he started college. Bound in dignified black covers with their titles embossed on the spines, these manuscripts—some of them written when he was only 14—have been acclaimed by his brothers as the work of ‘a mature satirist.’”

He studied English literature at Harvard University, and studied for a year at the American University in Cairo.

== Career ==
Theroux worked as a journalist in Saudi Arabia, and for a time was a stringer for The Wall Street Journal.

Theroux's first published translated literary work was the first volume of Cities of Salt, the contemporary epic novel cycle by the Saudi writer Abdelrahman Munif. He translated two further novels in that cycle. His translated works include contemporary fiction by Arabic writers from Egypt, Iraq and Saudi Arabia. These works include the following:

- Children of the Alley by Naguib Mahfouz, Egyptian Nobel Prize winner
- Rites of Assent by Abd al-Hakim Qasim (Egypt)
- Naphtalene: A Novel of Baghdad by Alia Mamdouh (Iraq)
- Yalo by Elias Khoury (Lebanon)
- Journey into the Heart of My Enemy by Najem Wali (Iraq), in English in 2009
- Dongola: A Novel of Nubia by Idris Ali, Nubia (in English 1998, first Nubian author to be translated), winner of the Arkansas Arabic Translation Award
- The House of Mathilde by Hassan Daoud (Lebanon, 1998), in English 2002
- Saraya, the Ogre's Daughter: a Palestinian Fairy Tale by Emile Habiby (1990), in English 2006
- Cities of Salt (1984) by Abdul Rahman Munif (Saudi Arabia); English translation in 1987

His translations are highly regarded. Fellow translator Raymond Stock said of his work, "[T]here's none better. His translations are clear and poetic and read like they’re written in English."

Theroux has also written his own books, including Sandstorms (1990), which recounted his travels in the Middle East. Writing in the Los Angeles Times, Alex Raksin described Sandstorms as a "stunningly candid portrait of culture and politics in the Middle East".

Theroux wrote Translating LA, about living in Los Angeles. He has contributed pieces to National Geographic magazine. According to an editor at Tablet, Theroux worked for over two decades as a senior CIA analyst.

== Personal life ==
Theroux lives in Los Angeles, California.

== Honors and awards ==
Theroux's translation of Idris Ali's Dongola: A Novel of Nubia won the University of Arkansas Press Award for Arabic Literature in Translation in 1997.
