= Ahmed Morsi =

Egyptian artist (1930–2026)

- أحمد مرسي
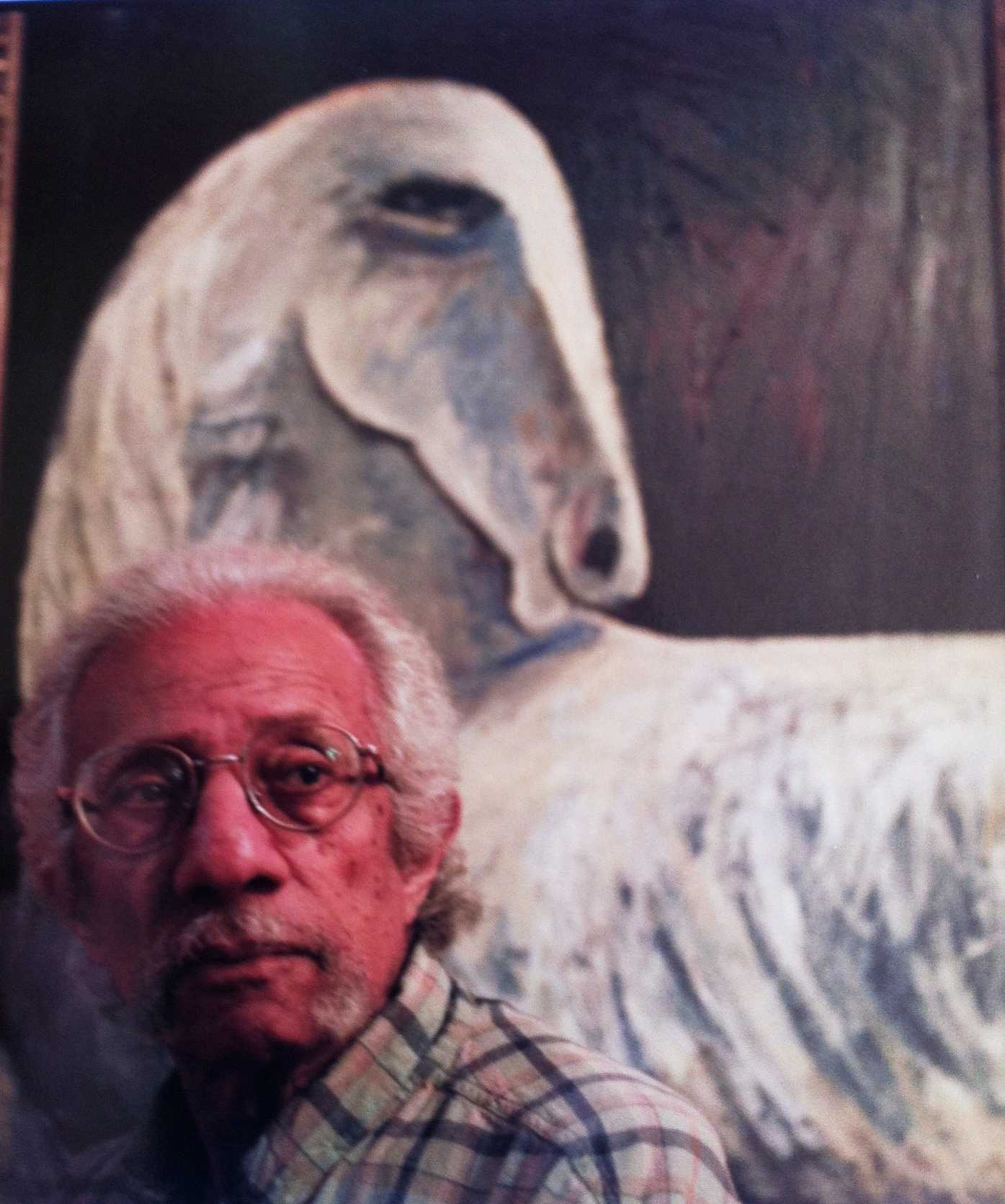
- Born: 30 March 1930; Alexandria, Egypt
- Died: 18 November 2026 (aged 96); Cairo, Egypt
- Known for: Poetry, painting, drawing, printmaking, set design and art criticism
- Movement: Surrealism, symbolism
- Website: ahmedmorsi.com

Ahmed Morsi (Arabic: أحمد مرسي; 30 March 1930 – 18 November 2026) was an Egyptian artist, art critic and poet.

== Early life and education ==
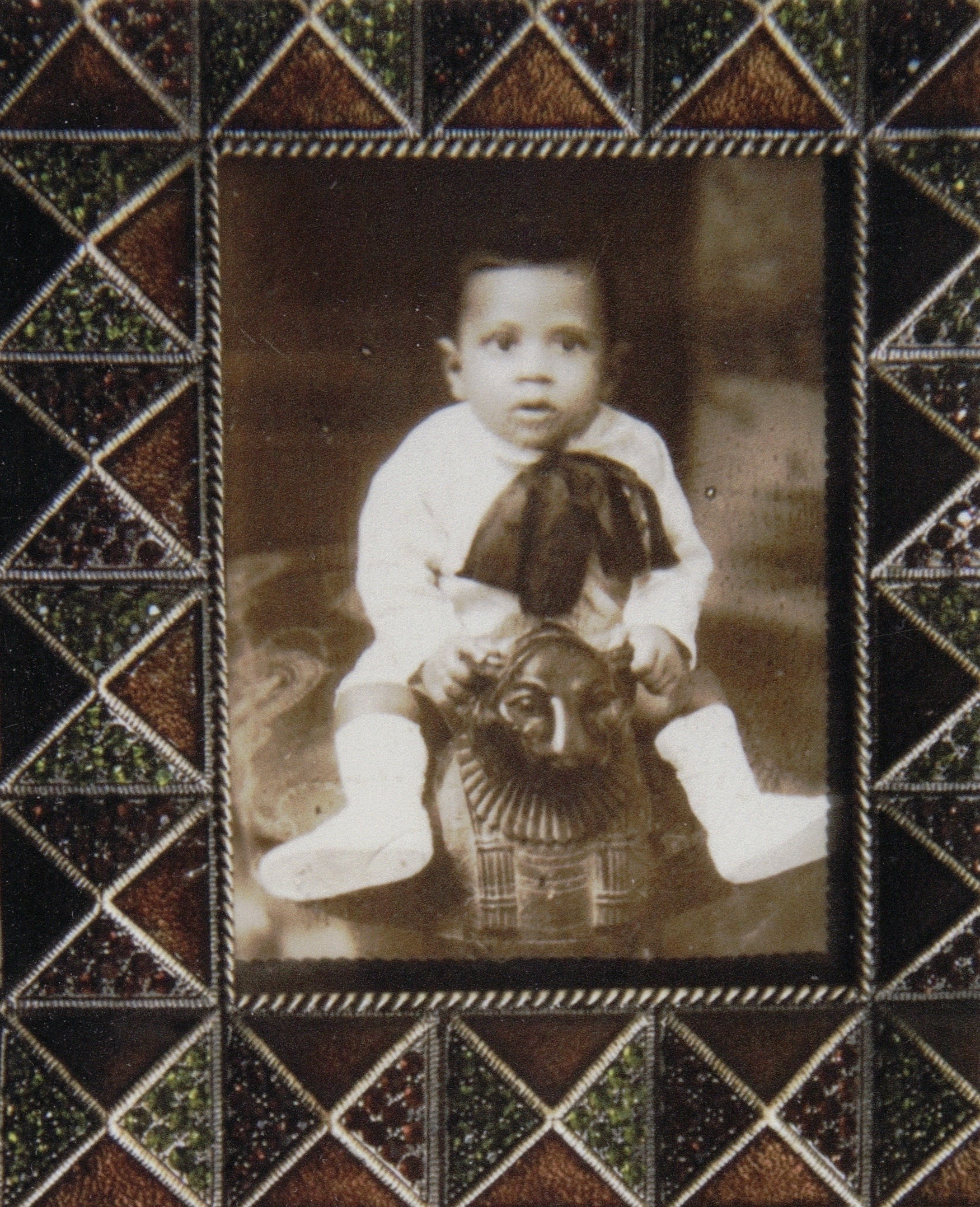
Ahmed Morsi as a child in the 1930s

Morsi was born in the coastal city of Alexandria, Egypt, on 30 March 1930. In 1954, he graduated from the University of Alexandria, Faculty of Arts with a major in English Literature. During the years 1952-53, he studied art with Silvio Becchi, son of Italian master Otorino Becchi, in Alexandria. Early on, Ahmed Morsi was initiated into Alexandria's literary society as well as the city's very own rising group of artists. By his early twenties, he was participating in group shows with Egypt's most notable modern artists, including A Al Gazzar, H El Telmisani, I Massouda, F Kamel, H Nada and M Moussa. In 1949, he started writing poetry and developed this talent in parallel with his painting – publishing his first Diwan, “Songs of the Temples / Steps in Darkness” at the age of 19.

== Career ==
Morsi moved to Baghdad, Iraq in 1955, where he taught English to supplement his two-year stay. This was a time of a cultural renaissance in Iraq, when Baghdad was a center for the literati, the artists and the intellectuals. It was in Baghdad that he developed a friendship and a working relationship with several Iraqi writers and painters, among them Abd al-Wahhab al-Bayati, Fouad al-Tikerly and Ardash Kakavian; and these relationships continued to produce noteworthy creative cooperation as well as lifelong friendships throughout the coming decades.

Returning to Egypt, he moved to Cairo in 1957. In these years, Ahmed Morsi was the first Egyptian to work alongside Egypt's acclaimed playwrights, Alfred Farag, Abdel Rahman Al Sharkawi, designing stage sets and costumes for The National Theater at the original, Khedieval, Cairo Opera House – art forms that had until then previously been relegated only to Italian designers. He also partnered with Abdel Hadi Al Algazzar and co-designed stage sets for "Bury the Dead" by American playwright Irwin Shaw at the Cairo Opera House. Other projects with Al Gazzar included a book of Morsi's poetry alongside Al Gazzar's drawings. The book was never published due to Al Gazzar's untimely passing, however the poetry/drawings live on. In 1968, he co-founded the avant-garde magazine Galerie 68 with Edwar Al Kharrat, Ibrahim Mansour, Gamil Atteya, Sayed Hegab and others. This publication immediately became Egypt's most reputable source as the voice of the new modernism. With these years began the Artist's journey into the world of criticism, publishing critiques on both art and literature, both of which remaining intimate domains. He wrote two items for Grand Larousse Encyclopédique (1975); “Art in Egypt” and “Art in Iraq”. Again the pioneer, Ahmed Morsi introduced a new creative vehicle to the art public in Egypt with his 1995 show: “The Artist’s Book”. Following his exhibition, a new Biennial, The Artist's Book, was created in Alexandria.

== Later life and death ==
In 1974, Morsi moved to New York City, where he continued to paint, write and critique from his Manhattan home. In 1976, like many artists residing in the NYC area, he took up the art of lithography at The New School, the art of printmaking at The Art Student League and added yet another dimension to his creative tools and in his last 20 years, the artist embraced photography – the last art form to be included in Ahmed Morsi's extensive palette.

Morsi died Cairo on 18 November 2026, at the age of 96.

== Exhibitions ==
=== Among the Solo Shows – Egypt ===
- 1953 First solo show at the University of Alexandria – Alexandria
- 1958 Cairo Atelier – Cairo
- 1958 Alexandria Museum of Fine Arts – Alexandria
- 1959 Cairo Atelier – Cairo
- 1960 Alexandria Museum of Fine Arts – Alexandria
- 1961 Alexandria Museum of Fine Arts – Alexandria
- 1966 Cairo Atelier – Cairo
- 1969 Cairo Atelier – Cairo
- 1970 Cairo Atelier – Cairo
- 1973 Akhnatoun Gallery – Cairo
- 1973 Soviet Cultural Center – Alexandria
- 1989 Akhnatoun Gallery – Cairo
- 1991 “Cavafy Suite”, Mashrabia Gallery – Cairo
- 1995 “The Artist’s Book”, Mashrabia Gallery – Cairo
- 1996 Akhnatoun Gallery – Cairo
- 2003 Akhnatoun Gallery – Cairo
- 2005 Akhnatoun Gallery Cairo
- 2012 “Metaphysics”, Gallery Misr – Cairo
- 2016 "Ahmed Morsi: A Pure Artist" first retrospective in Egypt, Ofok Gallery (Mahmoud Khalil Museum) – Cairo
- 2017 "Ahmed Morsi: You Closed Your Eyes in Order to See the Unseen", Gypsum Gallery – Cairo

=== Among the Solo Shows – International ===
- 1956 Al Wazireyeh Gallery, Society of Iraqi Artists – Baghdad
- 1970 The Pace Gallery – London
- 1975 Columbia University – NYC
- 1977 Asif Gallery – NYC
- 1985 Alef Gallery – Washington, DC
- 1987 Vorpal Gallery – SoHo, NYC
- 1996 Accademia d’Egitto – Rome
- 2017 "Ahmed Morsi: Dialogic Imagination", first international retrospective, Sharjah Museum – Sharjah, UAE
- 2017 "Ahmed Morsi", Art Dubai – Dubai, UAE
- 2023, "Ahmed Morsi in New York: Elegy of the Sea", ICA Miami, Miami, FL. Curated by Donna Honarpisheh.

=== Among the Group Shows ===
- 1954 Inaugural exhibition of the Museum of Fine Arts – Alexandria, Egypt
- 1954 Participated in a limited group show with A Al Gazzar, H El Telmisani, I Massouda and the Alexandrian sculptor M Moussa at the Societe d’Alliance Francaise – Alexandria
- 1954 Participated in the 1st Alexandria Biennial of Mediterranean Countries at the Museum of Fine Arts
- 1955 Participated in a limited group show with I Massouda, H El Telmisani, F Kamel and H Nada at the Museum of Modern Art and Cultural Center – Alexandria
- 1956 Participated in the 2nd Biennial of Mediterranean Countries at the Museum of Fine Arts – Alexandria
- 1958 Participated in a second limited group show with A al Gazzar, H El Telmisani, I Massouda, F Kamel and M Moussa at the Alexandria Museum of Fine Arts – Alexandria.
- 1958 Participated in the 3rd Biennial of Mediterranean Countries at the Museum of Fine Arts – Alexandria
- 1968 Participated in a limited group show with Ahmed El Rachidi, Adam Henein, Hassan Soliman, George El Bahgoury, Gamal Mahmoud, Daoud Aziz, Saad Abdel Wahab, Saleh Reda, Safeya Hilmi Hussein, Omar El Nagdi, Ali Desouki, Kamal Khalifa, Mohamed Hagrass, Mostafa Ahmed, Mostafa El Hallag, Makram Rizkallah and William Izhaq at the Cairo Atelier – Cairo
- 1971 The El Wasti International Exhibition – Baghdad
- 1996 The 6th International Biennial of Cairo – Cairo
- 1996 Participated in another session of the 6th International Cairo Biennial as a member of the committee of Jurors – Cairo
- 2007 Participated in the 1st Egypt “Salon” at Amir Taz Palace – Cairo
- 2007 Participated in a limited group show – “Spirit of the Moment … Spirit of the Image” – with Ahmed Fuad Selim and Hilmi El Tuni at Ebdaa Art Gallery – Cairo
- 2012 Participated in a limited group show, “Surrealism, Present-day Cairo” at The Gallery – Cairo
- 2016 Limited group show: "Looking at the World Around You: Contemporary Works From Qatar Museums", Santander Art Gallery – Madrid, Spain
- 2016 Limited group show: Debunking Orientalism, Untitled Space – SoHo, NYC, USA
- 2016 Limited group show: "When Art Becomes Liberty: The Egyptian Surrealists (1938 - 1965)", Palace of Fine Arts – Cairo, Egypt
- 2017 Limited group show: "When Art Becomes Liberty: The Egyptian Surrealists (1938 - 1965)", Museum of Modern and Contemporary Art – Seoul, South Korea

== Public collections ==
- Egyptian Museum of Modern Art – Cairo, Egypt
- Museum of Fine Arts – Alexandria, Egypt
- Mathaf: Arab Museum of Modern Art – Doha, Qatar
- Sharjah Art Foundation – Sharjah, UAE
- Barjeel Art Foundation – Dubai, UAE

Private collections in Egypt, Iraq, Kuwait, Qatar, Saudi Arabia, Syria, France, UK and USA

== Other activities ==
- 1956–57: Began writing art criticism for Iraqi Newspaper, "Al Akhbar", Al Akhbar - Baghdad
- 1958–1962: First non-foreigner to design sets and costumes for the Egyptian National Theater - Cairo
- Designed stage sets and costumes for the first play written by Alfred Farag, “The Fall of the Pharaoh”
- Co-designed with Abdel Hadi Al Gazzar settings for the American play “Bury the Dead” by Irwin Shaw
- Designed stage sets for the first play written by Abdel Rahman Al Sharkawi, “The Tragedy of Jamila Bohreid”
- 1968: Co-founded “Gallery ‘68” magazine - Cairo
- 1995: Introduced to the art public in Egypt “The Artist’s Book”. Thanks to this pioneering effort, The Alexandria

Library established a Biennial solely for this new creative vehicle, “The Artist’s Book”.

== Criticism, poetry and translation ==
- 1949: Published his first collection of poems, “Songs of Temples / Steps in Darkness” - Alexandria
- 1957–1974: Covered the activities of art in Egypt for the 2nd Program Radio in Cairo and participated in the radio program “Culture News Around the World”
- 1959: Co-translated “Eluard: The Poet of Freedom and Love” with Iraqi Poet Abdel Wahab Al Bayyati, published by Al Maaret Bookshop - Beirut
- 1959: Co-translated “Aragon, : The Poet of Resistance” with Abdel Wahab Al Bayyati, published by Al Maaret Bookshop

- Beirut

- 1968: Decided to stop writing poetry out of a sense of estrangement
- 1968: Co-published the avant-garde magazine, “Galerie 68”, along with Edwar Al Kharrat, Ibrahim Mansour, Gamil

Atteya and Sayed Hegab – which played a pivotal role in developing the new-modernism of Arabic literature

- 1970:

- The Iraqi Ministry of Culture published his book, “Picasso”

- Translated “A View from a Bridge” by Arthur Miller, which translation and play was staged in the 1970s by The National Theater

- 1975: The Iraqi Ministry of Culture published his book, “Introduction to American Black Poetry”
- 1997: He reclaimed the poet who was exiled 30 years prior, without calculation
- 1999: The Supreme Council of Culture published his study, “Contemporary American Poetry I”
- 2001: The National Center for Translation published his book “Readings of Contemporary American Poetry II”

- The League of Books published his book, “Contemporary American Poetry III”

- The Supreme Council of Culture published his book, “American Contemporary Art”

- 2012: The Supreme Council of Culture published his Anthology, “The Collected Poems”
