= Idris Ali =

Idris Ali may refer to:

- Idris Ali (writer)
- Idris Ali (politician)
