= George Bryan Polivka =

American writer, producer, and author (born 1957)

George Bryan Polivka (born July 26, 1957) is an American writer, producer, and author. He is known for the 1987 sports documentary A Hard Road to Glory, which he co-wrote with Arthur Ashe and Bob Briner. The trio was awarded a Sports Emmy for their writing in 1987.

Polivka is a writer of Christian fiction novels and the third entry in his Trophy Chase trilogy was nominated for a 2009 Christy Award "Visionary" Award. Polivka lives near Baltimore, Maryland, with his wife and children.

== Documentaries ==
- A Hard Road to Glory (1986)

== Trophy Chase ==
The Trophy Chase series is made up of a trilogy of novels, the first and second of which were published in 2007 through Harvest House Publishers. The series is set in a fantasy world and follows a young man, Packer Throme, who decides to learn the ways of a famous pirate in order to save his struggling village. As the initial trilogy progresses the story goes beyond Packer saving his village, as he must also find a way to save the world.

A prequel novel, Blaggard's Moon, was published in 2009, also through Harvest House Publishers. This novel focuses on Smith Delaney, a sailor turned pirate and covers his adventures leading up to his signing on with pirate Scat Wilkins and his ship, the Trophy Chase. What do I read next? classified this book as Christian inspirational fantasy literature, hinging upon the protagonist as a "pirate who must deal with his own death as well as his faith in God", and recommended its reading.

- The Legend of the Firefish (2007)
- The Hand that Bears the Sword (2007)
- The Battle for Vast Dominion (2008)
- Blaggard’s Moon (2009)

== Awards ==
- Sports Emmy for Writing, A Hard Road to Glory (1987, won, co-written with Arthur Ashe and Bob Briner)
