= The Seven Days of Man =

1969 novel by Abdel Hakim Qassem

- Author: Abd al-Hakeem Qasim
- Language: Arabic
- Genre: literature
- Published: 1969
- Publisher: Al-Shorouk
- Publication date: 1969

The Seven Days of Man is a novel by the Egyptian author Abdel Hakim Qassem. It was published in 1969 by Al-Shorouk publishing house. The novel is set in an Egyptian village and talks about a topic that nobody else wrote about which is the Dervish life. These poor peasants who spend their day in the fields, and when the evening comes they return to the "Presence" where remembrance and chant after prayer is done, and where they dream of the day they go to the birth of Mr. Ahmed Al-Badawi in Tanta. The Seven Days of Man is an indication of a way of perceiving that we have neglected to contemplate for a long time. The novel is on the list of the 100 best Arabic novels.

== Plot ==
The Seven Days of Man is a Bildungsroman and follows the child Abd al-Aziz who is the most important element in the extension of the life cycle in which he moves within a village family, whose care giver belongs to a Sufi group inside the village. The critics call this type of novels "Genesis novel", which is a type of novel with special characteristics that are only present in famous novels like "Emotional education" for the French writer Flaubert, which is a story that talks about a hero who falls in love for the first time, moving from the world of childhood to the world of adolescence, which does not end except at the verge of manhood or the completion of youth. When Abdel Mohsen Badr wrote about Abdel Hakim Qassem’s novel in his book "The Novelist and the Land" in which he studied "The Seven Days of Man", he drew attention to the novelist's relationship with the village, and how a generation differed from another in making the village a fictional subject. This focus seems to have made the critics pay attention to this aspect, including Dr. Muhammad Badawi, who was preoccupied with the impact of socio-economic change on the novel. After that, studies proceeded in this direction, in which Muhammad Badawi continued to describe the novel that it revolves around a Sufi group of marginalized people in the village. This understanding prompted the novelists to ask: Does the novel really revolve around the village? And the novel really does revolve around the village, but through a specific perspective which is the perspective of the writer who writes about his childhood and upbringing and opens his awareness of the world within a village, and the formation of his religious awareness increases through the group that was led by his father.
