= Ibrahim Fathi =

Egyptian writer, intellectual, and critic (1931–2019)

- Born: August 23, 1930; Cairo, Kingdom of Egypt
- Died: October 3, 2019 (aged 89); London, United Kingdom
- Occupations: Critic; writer; intellectual
- Notable work: The Narrative World of Najib Mahfouz

Ibrahim Fathi (Egyptian Arabic: ابراهيم فتحى; 1931 – 2019) was an Egyptian writer, intellectual and critic of the 1960s. He was called the dean of leftist intellectuals; he has numerous articles and papers published in various Arabic and foreign periodicals. In addition, Fathi was briefly a part of HADETU (Al-Haraka Al-Dimuqratiya Lil-Tahrir Al-Watani; Arabic for: The Democratic Movement for National Liberation). Fathi was honored in 2018 at the Supreme Council of Culture of Egypt for his intellectual output and role in enriching the intellectual life. In addition, Najib Mahfouz praised his writing by criticizing his works.

== Life ==
He was one of the top high school students in Egypt, and he joined the Faculty of Medicine after moving to Cairo. Together with some of his fellow writers of the late 1940s and early 1950s including Yusuf Idris, Salah Hafez, and Mohamed Yusri Ahmed, who were involved in the activities of the Office of Writers and Artists, Fathi was a part of a literary movement. He also translated and wrote several books, beginning by translating Defeat (original: al-hazīmah), the Arabic translation of a novel by Russian writer Alexander Fadeyev. Moreover, Fathi worked as a politician for the Egyptian Left.

In 1959, he was imprisoned for his political affiliations. After being released in 1964, he started his thought and criticism project. His articles were published in poetry and cultural magazines, as well as in Yahya Haqqi’s magazine, Al-Majalla. Given his knowledge of English and French, he edited a section of the magazine that deals with presenting topics discussed in foreign magazines.

He contributed in founding a political organization that brought together young poets, critics, writers and journalists, such as poets Abdel Rahman el-Abnudi, Sayed Hijab, critics Sabri Hafez, Ghalib Halasa and Sayed Khamis, writers Gamal al-Ghitani and Yahya Taher Abdullah, journalist Salah Essa, and translator Khalil Kalfat. Therefore, he was detained once again in September 1966. French philosopher Jean-Paul Sartre’s condition for visiting Cairo prior to the June War, however, was for them to be released.

He also participated in founding The Writers of Tomorrow Society, which has played a prominent role in Egyptian cultural, intellectual and political life since the end of the 1960s. The Society published some literary publications, most notably The Face of Egypt poetry collection by Zayn al-Abideen Fuʼad, Entrance to Tagore Gardens by Izzat Amer and Thirsty for Seawater by Mohammed Ibrahim Mabrouk.

He also wrote the introduction of the story collection Papers of Love and Thirst by Mohammed Abdel Rahman and poetic works of Samir Abdel Baqi and Sayed Hijab upon being published by Dar Al Fikr Publishing.

== Activity ==
He began his career by translating Defeat (original: al-hazīmah), the Arabic translation of a novel by Russian writer Alexander Fadeyev, and then wrote several articles and papers published in Arab and foreign periodicals. He was honored by the Ministry of Culture, represented by the Higher Council of Culture, for his many works, which enriched intellectual life. He cofounded the magazine Galerie 68, which introduced a qualitative culture involving a number of writers, poets and intellectuals. He also cofounded Gam'iyat Kuttab Al-Ghad (Arabic for: The Association of the Writers of Tomorrow), which has had an impact on cultural, intellectual and political life since the end of the 1960s.

He called himself "the sidewalk critic" as he used to meet writers outside the institutional framework where he kept up with their works of criticism.

He had a weekly seminar in Atelier Cairo in the 1980s and 1990s, where he discussed literary and intellectual works.

His book The Narrative World of Naguib Mahfouz received considerable attention for resisting the negative view of the left about Mahfouz’s writings. He also wrote important articles preaching about 1960s generation writers outside political organizations and was the first to present Ibrahim Aslan, Yahya Taher Abdullah, Mohamed el-Bisatie, Mohamed Hafez Rajab, Bahaa Taher and Gamal al-Ghitani.

== Works ==
- The Fictional World of Naguib Mahfouz
- Narrative and Critical Discourse in Egypt
- The Short Story and Epic Speech of Najib Mahfouz
- The Comedy of Totalitarianism
- His book on the American Nobel Prize winning novelist, Saul Bellow: The Split Persona of the Jewish Novelist.
- Glossary of Literary Terms
- Marxism and the Systematic Crisis
- Henri Curiel against the Arab Communist Movement

== Translations ==
- Les règles de l'Art (French for: The Rules of Art) by Pierre Bourdieu
- Questions de sociologie (French for: Sociology in Question) by Pierre Bourdieu
- The Cambridge History of Literary Criticism: Romanticism
- The Crisis of Historical Knowledge by Paul Veyne
- Dialectical Materialism by Henri Lefebvre
- Hegel’s Ontology and the Theory of Historicity by Herbert Marcuse

== Death ==
He died on October 3, 2019, after returning from Cairo to London, spending the last 10 years of his life between Cairo and London accompanied by his wife, Hanaa Suleiman.
