= Elliott Colla =

American Arabist scholar

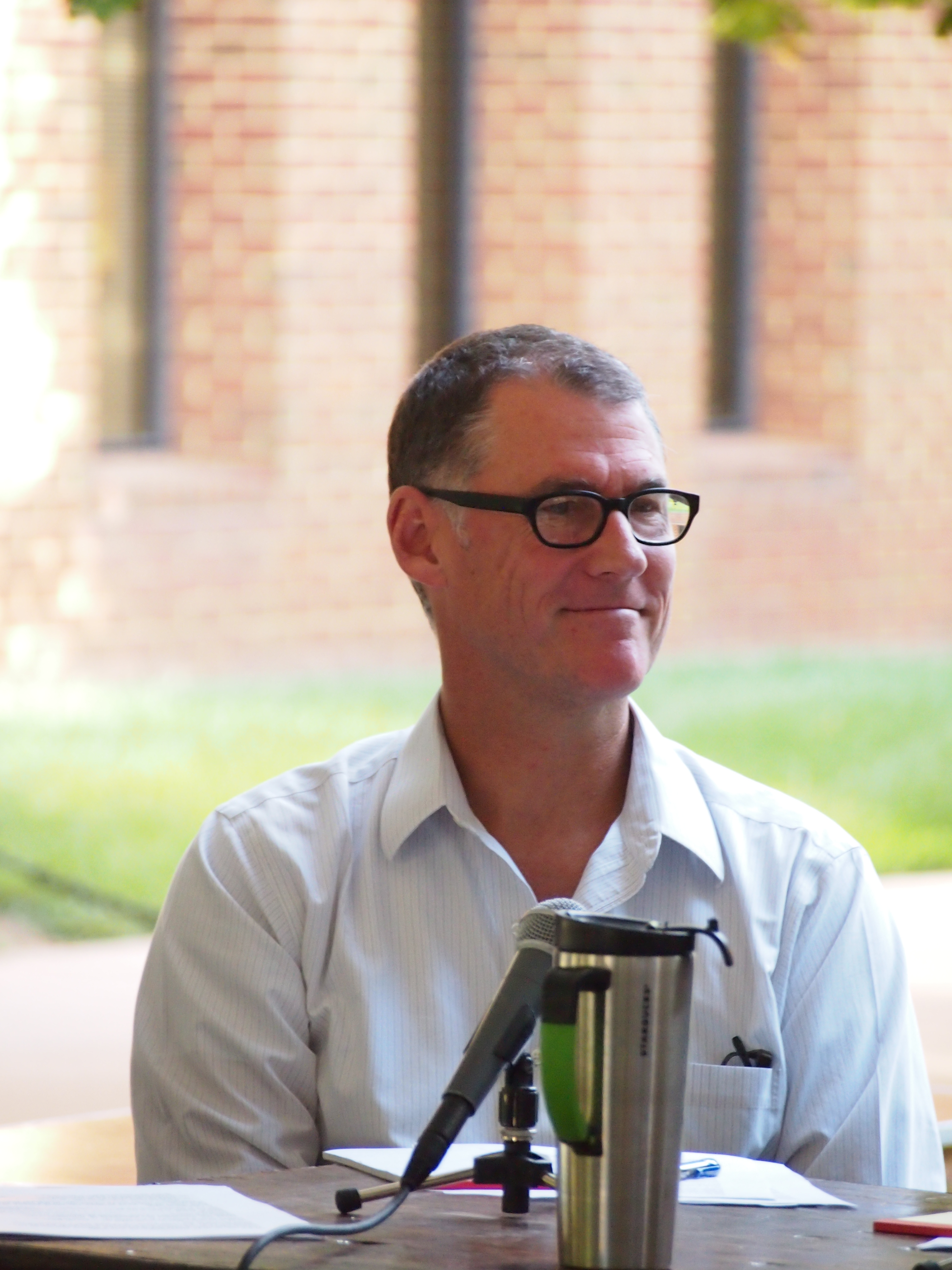
- Elliott Colla
- Occupation: Associate Professor
- Writing career
- Subject: Middle East
- Notable works: Conflicted Antiquities: Egyptology, Egyptomania, Egyptian Modernity

Elliott Colla is an American scholar of the Middle East, specializing in Arabic literature and culture. He is an associate professor in the Department of Arabic and Islamic Studies at Georgetown University and leads the Reading Palestine book club at Lost City Books.

== Career ==
Colla received a B.A. from University of California, Berkeley in 1989 and his Ph.D. in Comparative literature from Berkeley in 2000. His translation of Gold Dust was runner-up for the Banipal Prize in 2009. He is a co-editor of the e-zine, Jadaliyya. In addition to translations and academic works, he has published a novel Baghdad Central (2014). This was adapted as a television series of the same name, released in 2020.

=== Books ===
- Conflicted Antiquities: Egyptology, Egyptomania, Egyptian Modernity. Durham: Duke University Press, 2007.
- Baghdad Central London: Bitter Lemon Press, 2014.

== Translations ==
- Ibrahim Aslan - The Heron
- Idris Ali - Poor
- Ibrahim al-Koni - Gold Dust
- Rabai Madhoun - The Lady from Tel Aviv

== See also ==
- List of Arabic-English translators
