= East of the Mediterranean =

Novel by Abdul Rahman Al-Munif

East of the Mediterranean or Sharq al-Mutawassit is a 1975 novel by Saudi Arabian writer Abdul Rahman Munif.

The novel deals with powerful themes of freedom. Its protagonist is Rajab Ismail, who is subject to eleven years of extreme torture and is eventually made blind during the horrific ordeal. The novel marked the beginning of Munif's exploration of the Arabic wilderness in his novels with Munif's venture into the desert.
