= Oil on Water =

2010 novel by Helon Habila

- Author: Helon Habila
- Genre: Petrofiction
- Publisher: Penguin Books
- Publication date: 5 August 2010
- ISBN: 978-0-241-14486-2

Oil on Water is a 2010 petrofiction novel by Nigerian author Helon Habila. The novel documents the experience of two journalists as they try to rescue a kidnapped European wife in the oil landscape of the Niger Delta. The novel explores the ecological and political consequences of oil conflict and petrodollars in the delta.

== Plot ==
Oil on Water is a story about two people, Rufus, an emerging journalist, and Zaq, a famous reporter. They went to the Niger Delta in pursuit of an abducted white woman named Isabel Floode, who was used as a bargaining chip in Nigeria's civil war.

== Reception ==
=== Reviews ===
The novel was well received. Orion called it "a powerful work, one that reaffirms that art done well is always big enough to contain politics." The Guardian's Rachel Aspden called it a "powerful, accomplished third novel [that] displays a growing pessimism about journalism's capacity to effect change."

=== Awards ===
| Year | Award | Category | Result | Ref. |
|---|---|---|---|---|
| 2011 | Commonwealth Writers Prize | Africa | Shortlisted | |
| 2012 | PEN Open Book Award | — | Shortlisted | |
| 2013 | Orion Book Award | — | Shortlisted | |
