= Cities of Salt =

Book by Abdul Rahman Munif

- Author: Abdel Rahman Munif
- Original title: مدن الملح
- Translator: Peter Theroux
- Language: Arabic
- Series: Cities of Salt
- Genre: Novel
- Publisher: Random House (Eng. trans.)
- Publication date: 1984
- Publication place: Saudi Arabia
- English publication date: 1987
- Media type: Print (hardback & paperback)
- Pages: 627 pp (paperback)
- ISBN: 0-394-75526X
- Preceded by: –
- Followed by: The Trench

Cities of Salt (Arabic: مدن الملح, romanized: Mudun al-Milḥ) is a petrofiction novel by Abdul Rahman Munif. It was first published in Lebanon in 1984 and was immediately recognized as a major work of Arab literature. It was translated into English by Peter Theroux. The novel, and the quintet of which it is the first volume, describes the far-reaching effects of the discovery of huge reserves of oil under a once-idyllic oasis somewhere on the Arabian peninsula.

"Oil is our one and only chance to build a future," Munif once told Theroux, "and the regimes are ruining it." In the novel and its sequels, great oil-rich cities are soon built, described as cities of salt. When asked by Tariq Ali to explain the book's title, Munif said, "Cities of Salt means cities that offer no sustainable existence. When the waters come in, the first waves will dissolve the salt and reduce these great glass cities to dust. In antiquity, as you know, many cities simply disappeared. It is possible to foresee the downfall of cities that are inhuman. With no means of livelihood they won't survive."

== Author and composition ==
Abdul Rahman Munif was born to Saudi parents in 1933 in Amman, Jordan, which at the time was under British rule. He was later stripped of his Saudi citizenship for his criticism of the royal family and its use of the country's oil reserves. He earned a license in law from Baghdad and Cairo Universities, and a Ph.D. in oil economics from the University of Belgrade. He subsequently served as Director of Planning in the Syrian Oil Company and Director of Crude Oil Marketing. He was editor-in-chief of a monthly periodical, Al-Naft wal Tanmiya (Oil & Development), in Baghdad. These early hands-on experience with oil development in Arab countries provide Munif invaluable insights in his writings. Cities of Salt, which is the first novel of a quintet, was written during his stay in France and originally published in Beirut in 1984.

== Characters (selected) ==
- Miteb Al-Hathal is the patriarchal figure of the proudest Atoub tribe. He is a protector of the town and opposition to Ibn Rashed. He has been a witness of the old Wadi Al-Uyoun and he is very wary of the motivation of the intruding Americans. When the excavating oil and the total transformation of the Wadi are irreversible, Miteb left Wadi in grief and ever since become a haunting phantom that allegedly will return with vengeance one day.
- Ibn Rashed is the owner of the encampment that served the arriving Americans. He eagerly cooperated with Americans to excavate oils, hire local labors, and relocate people. He is unwilling to get himself into troubles when Mizban died. Many hated him because of his greed and coarseness. Towards the end, Ibn Rashed died and his death complicates people's feelings towards him.
- Umm Khosh is a mother of a long-traveling son. She has kept her faith in waiting for her son's return to Wadi despite mocking from kids and others. The poor women died when people were forced to leave the town due to excavation of oil and constructions.
- The emir is a young authoritative ruler of the region. He supports the Americans' drilling of oil and firmly believes the government knows better about the issue when confronted by Miteb. However, he refused to sing for the Americans as it is a self-abasing gesture. Emir becomes obsessed with Western technologies, especially the radios and cars. The emir left Harran after riots of workers broke out.
- Abdu Muhammad is the baker in Harran. He adorned the bakery with pictures that he torn out of the foreign magazines, mostly pictures of women. Abdu would lock himself up in his bakery without explaining what has happened. Later on, the people learn that he has fallen in love with one of the women on the American cruise. He is a figure that represents the influence of Western cultures on Arab people.
- Mizban and Hajem are brothers of working class. They are among the few local people who are good at swimming. Most people are afraid of water since they rarely have been to seaside in their life. Mizban and Hajem are eager to teach the workers to swim. In the middle of the book, Mizban drowned and died when he was trying to board the boat and stuck his foot in the crevice of a boulder. Hajem and his uncle are forced to leave after Mizban's death.
- Akoub and Raji are truck drivers working on the Ujra-Harran road after the emergence of commercial towns. Akoub is an Armenian Christian. They are initially competitors but bond together when their jobs are threatened by the faster American trucks owned by large companies. They refuse to sell their old trucks to the company. Akoub died due to illness at the end of the book. Akoub and Raji represent those people who struggle for living when facing superior Western technologies.
- Subhi al-Mahmilji is an upperclass doctor that practices modern medicine. He is initially a foe of Mufaddi but they developed a friendship later.
- Mufaddi al-Jeddan is a local doctor that practices traditional, arguably outdated and sometimes misleading, medicine. Mufaddi is contempt of money and refuse to receive payment for treatment. Mufaddi is the first prisoner of the emir because of his protest against capitalism. Mufaddi got killed by Johar in the end.
- Hassan Rezaie, businessman working for the American company. He is eager to bring western technologies, such as the radio, to the emir.
- Johar, the commander of the newly formed Desert Army.

== Style and genre ==
- Cities of Salt diverges from typical novel forms as it does not have one prolonged and consistent storyline. Instead, the book tells several episodes of the reactions and fates of lower-class working people after the emergence of petro-capitalism. Some scholars also argue the fact that the novel does not have a conventional protagonist also makes it atypical. Others identify the community of working class Arabs as an aggregate protagonist.
- Boullata claims Cities of Salt is a postcolonial writing because the narrative of cultural encounter between Orient and Occident is an attempt to "establish Arab authenticity and disengage itself from Western influences".
- Munif presents himself as a historian of Arab life that chronicles the every-day concerns and issues of the oppressed Arabs and transcribe them into words.
- The term "petrofiction" is coined by Amitav Ghosh to classify literature about the oil industry, citing Cities of Salt is a masterpiece of the sub-genre.
- Cities of Salt is closer to literary realism as it loyal depicts the everyday life and activities among lower class Arabs with little "romantic idealization or dramatization".

== Themes ==
=== Role of resource ===
Petroleum and a logic of extraction figure is central in the making and breaking of community. Munif asks what kind of role does petroleum plays in Arab societies. Oil appeared to be a source of wealth from the outside whereas in reality, it "impoverished the Arab and hijacked his destiny". Numerous societal phenomena, including "the oil press", "modern-day oil life", and "oil Islam", have risen because of oil. Unfortunately, abundant oil has not brought sustainable economic growth nor democratic reforms. In the book, petrodollars perpetuate oppressions. American companies are the ones that profit the most and consequently they can lay off employees and settle the death of Mizban. The emir is able to imprison Mufaddi and form armies. Mapping this onto the larger real world, we have witnessed numerous conflicts fighting for oils: the Gulf War, the Oil Crisis, the Iraq War. Oil economy disincentives Arab nations to diversify their composition of economies.

=== Encounter of the Occident and the Orient ===
==== Technological ====
Manpower stands no chance against superior Western technologies. The increase of productivity and wealth often comes with price of collapse of domestic industries and unemployment. In the novel, Akoub and Raji lost their job as truck drivers when faster and more efficient American trucks appear. People also feel amazed and ignorant when personally seeing all the incredible Western inventions. For example, the emir becomes a curious little child when trying to figure out how the radios work.

==== Cultural ====
The influx of modern western cultures pose great challenges to the beliefs in the relatively isolated community. In the book, the "Satan's ship" is a boisterous American cruise that carried many blond American women in nudity. Many Arab people deem this as a corruption of their soul, a psychological shock to the socially conservative and religious society, and something they can not easily forget. Abdu Muhammad is surrounded in controversies by adorning the bakery with pictures of women from foreign magazines and falling in love with a portrait of an American woman.

=== Price of modernization ===
==== Social alienation and polarization ====
As the modernization process continues, the emergence of different societal groups often leads to clashes of interests. In the book, readers increasingly see the divergence of two groups of people that have contrasting attitudes towards cooperation with Americans. One group, led by Miteb and working class Arabs are wary of the promises made by capitalists and the repercussions of drastic social transformations. Material self-interests push another group, led by Ibn Rashed and Rezaie, to align themselves with the Americans and create a separate and different identity marked with better living standards, familiarity with modern technology, close relationship with the emir and a relentless desire to dominate.

Two incidents illustrate how the proletariats become aware of their lack of rights and power. First, the personnel office requires each worker to be interviewed to determine their classification. Such interviews, however, really give the workers a sense of intrusion and suspicion. Second incident is the death of Mizban. The company refused to pay any retribution and detained Hajem and his uncle. The bourgeois, however, receives much hatred after the happening of multiple incidents. For example, he recruits people with alluring promises but only provides barracks in the end. He is perceived to be colluding with the American company to settle the death of Mizban. The emir becomes obsessed with his "new toys" and stops to really care about the well-being of his people. Social alienation engenders and consolidates societal split based on class. The book captures the nuanced moment of the emergence of class consciousness:

"The shift ended, and all the men drifted home to the two sectors like streams coursing down a slope, one broad and one small, the Americans to their camp and the Arabs to theirs, the Americans to their swimming pools, where their racket could be heard in the nearby barracks behind the barbed wire. When silence fell, the workers guessed that the Americans had gone into their air-conditioned rooms whose thick curtains shut everything out: sunlight, dust, flies, and Arabs."

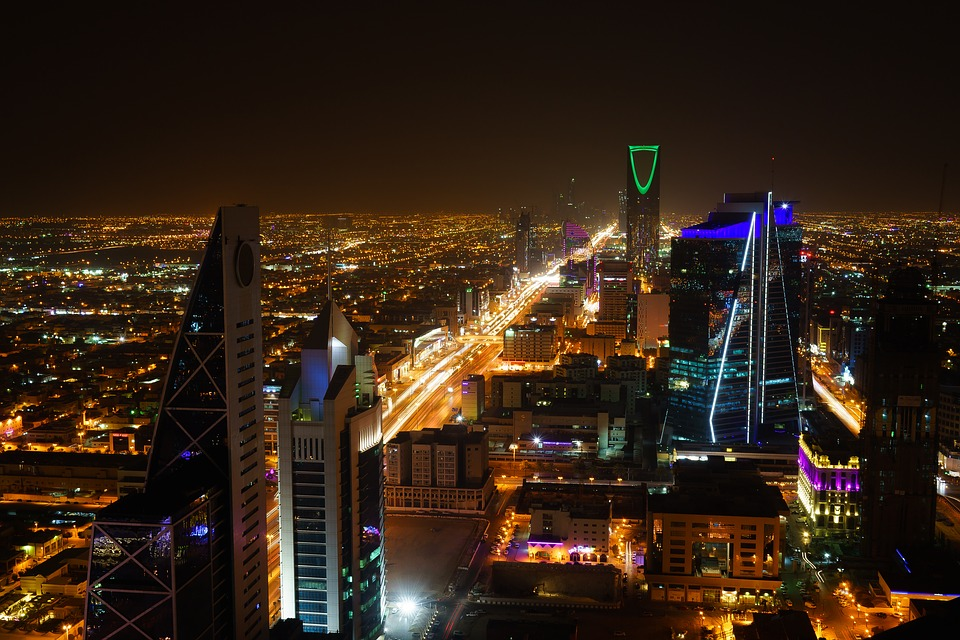
Night scene of modern Riyadh

==== Breakdown of physical space ====
“The old Harran you knew is gone. It has been obliterated”. With the drilling of oil going on, local people often have to be relocated or travel with the company as their homes are torn down. Palm trees are uprooted as if they are butchered. Ships, trucks, and monstrous machines roar on the construction sites. When travelers return to Wadi, they could barely recognize the place they used to live in. For example, to the returning Fawaz, "Wadi seems to be a place he had never seen before. There was no trace of the wadi he had left behind; none of the old things remained."

==== Loss of cultural identity ====
Wadi's people's culture is an environmental-based one. People and the environmental components are inseparable. Despite that people remain in the same geographical space, the destructions or losses of any environmental surroundings are equivalent to the stripping of their cultural identities. For example, the people are asked to give up the most precious they owned, the camels. Munif, once again, eloquently expresses such theme: "What happened was not just the loss of place called Wadi al-Uyoun, nor any loss that a man could describe or grow accustomed to. He realized that it was a breaking off, like death, that nothing and no one could ever heal."

=== Oppression and resistance ===
Oppression and resistance has always been a central theme of Munif's novels. The internal oppression comes from the emir. Mufaddi has been protesting against the corrupting effects of money. He then become the first resident in the emir's jail and eventually murdered by Johar when he refuses to work in stone quarry or leave. The external oppressions are exerted by American colonialism and capitalism. The personnel office conducted interviews that made workers very uncomfortable and vigilant. Workers also realized their powerlessness after the irresponsible and sloppy settlement of the death of Mizban. Finally, American company's arbitrary laying off of workers become the last straw. The mounting unrest and class conflicts eventually erupt into a workers' revolt. Al-Sarrani further explores the humanized resistance of environment by showing the protests and simultaneous fading away of humans, birds, and animals.

== Contexts ==
=== Historical context ===
==== The Six-Day War ====
The Six-Day War, also known as the 1967 Arab-Israeli War, was fought between Israel and its neighboring states Egypt, Syria, and Jordan. The war ended with a total defeat of the Arab nations. Israel seized the West Bank, the Gaza Strip, and the Sinai peninsula. Munif, like many others in his generation, possessed dreams of Arab ascendancy and considered the humiliating loss the most dangerous defeat of the 20th century. Therefore, the defeat urged him to contemplate the causes of the defeat and to question the hierarchies behind these causes. In Cities of Salt, Munif explored the oppressive political structure in Arab societies as well as the oil that impoverished Arab people.

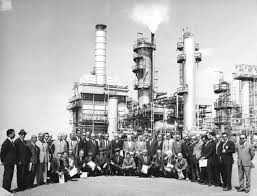
Discovery of oil in Saudi Arabia

==== Discovery of oil ====
Americans first discovered Saudi Arabian oil in commercial quantities in 1938. US-controlled Aramco (Arabian American Oil Company) began full scale development in 1941. The petrodollars not only brought economic prosperity and international political leverage, but also wasteful government spending and domestic suppression. The large inflow of foreign workers, commodities, and capital also fundamentally transformed the religious and traditional society. Superior Western technologies outcompeted old modes of production. Western ideas and cultures often challenged Arab people's beliefs.

=== Political context ===
Authoritarian states like Iran, Saudi Arabia, and UAE in the Arab world have used petrodollars to uphold their political power-structures. Criticism and dissidence are censored or strictly monitored. Externally, the Arab world is still haunted by the relics of colonialism and imperialism. Britain made many important statements, such as the British Mandate for Palestine and the Balfour Declaration, that led to the creation of Israel. There is also an internal split of opinion on the relationship with the U.S. within the Arab world. Countries like Saudi Arabia and Israel have eagerly been working with the U.S. while others like Iran and Iraq feel antagonistic to the U.S., marked with the 1973 Oil Crisis and the U.S.'s continuous support of Israel.

=== Social context ===
The Arab world is also ambivalent about having a fully secular, western-style society. Iran is still a theocratic country and Saudi Arabia a monarchy. Governments and the general public are wary of Western influences that might corrupt their hearts and minds. For example, Saudi Arabia did not lift the ban on cinemas until 2018.

== Interpretation ==
=== Title ===
One possible explanation of the book title Cities of Salt is that both salt and oil are very valuable resources in the past and the present. The analogy is alluding to countries that possess abundant oil resources in the Arab World. Another explanation is offered by Munif himself during an interview: "Cities of salt means cities that offer no sustainable existence. When the waters come in, the first waves will dissolve the salt and reduce these great glass cities to dust. In antiquity, as you know, many cities simply disappeared."

=== Book ===
After recognizing the connection between the oil age and its problematic externalities, economic, political, environmental, sexual, aesthetic, and even religious, Cities of Salt asks us to contemplate the human effects of its eventual passing. Being both an epitome and a reminiscence of the traumas brought by colonial and imperial exploitations that persist until today, the novel pushes us to re-evaluate the gains and losses, especially lives, self, and love.

== Criticism and receptions ==
Cities of Salt was banned in Saudi Arabia and few other countries because it satirizes Arab elitist government, exposes Americans' cruel treatment, and has the potential of evoking rebellious emotions.

"A powerful, untold story, done with humor, grace, and a resonant depth of feelings" --- Kirkus Reviews

"Brings to life many of the political issues that have plagued the Mideast for most of this century ... Theroux's sensitive translation conveys the subtleties of ambiguity and nuance inherent to the Arab language and culture ... Munif writes from a unique vantage point; English-languages readers have been given few opportunities before now to look at this situation through native eyes." --- Publishers Weekly
