= The Story of a Magian Love =

1974 novel by Abdul Rahman Munif

- Author: Abdul Rahman Munif
- Language: Arabic
- Publisher: al-Muassasa al-Arabiyya lid-Dirasat wan-Nashr
- Publication date: 1974

The Story of a Magian Love (Arabic: قصة حب مجوسية) is a short novel by renowned Saudi writer Abdul Rahman Munif. It was originally published in Beirut in 1974, and was republished in 2013 by Dar al-Tanweer.

== Plot summary ==
The novel, written in the first person, tells the story of a young student in an unnamed country. Although the setting is unspecified, the characters' names suggest the location is in eastern Europe (Munif had previously lived and studied in Belgrade).

He goes with two friends, Radmila and Ivan, to stay at a summer resort in the mountains, and becomes jealous when the two begin a relationship with each other. Meanwhile, the narrator glimpses a married woman named Lillian who is also staying at the resort, and becomes obsessed with her. Although he doesn't speak to her, they briefly dance together at a masked ball on his final night there.

When the narrator returns to the city, he resumes on-again-off-again relationships with two other students, Mira and Paula. However, his infatuation with Lillian leads him to wander the city searching for her, despite the fact that she is married with two children. He spends months looking for her at cafes, tram cars, cinemas, and the theater. He manages to see her twice, from a distance, which leaves him emotionally overwhelmed.

At the end of his school year, the narrator decides to leave the city for a year. At the train station, while his friends are bidding him farewell, he spots Lillian looking at the departure schedule. He approaches Lillian, who has her baby with her, and informs him she is moving to Italy. They briefly talk, and he awkwardly introduces her to his friends. Mira, who has ended her relationship with the narrator but still has feelings for him, is angered by this. As the narrator's train departs, he asks Lillian for her address so that he can write to her. Although she appears to be overcome with emotion at their encounter, she refuses, saying that there would be no point.

The novel's title refers to the Zoroastrian priests known as Magi, comparing the narrator's love for Lillian with the Magi's worshiping of fire.

Infatuation, envy, and promiscuity are among the novel's main themes.
