= Tropic of Orange =

1997 novel by Karen Tei Yamashita

- Author: Karen Tei Yamashita
- Language: English
- Genre: Magic Realism Fiction
- Published: 1997 (Coffee House Press)
- Publication place: United States
- Media type: Print
- ISBN: 1-56689-064-0
- OCLC: 36961003
- Preceded by: Brazil-Maru
- Followed by: Circle K Cycles

Tropic of Orange is a novel by Karen Tei Yamashita published in 1997. Set in Los Angeles and Mexico with a diverse, multi-ethnic cast of characters, the novel is generally considered a work of magic realism but can also be considered science fiction, postcolonial literature, speculative fiction, postmodern literature, world literature, or literature of transnationalism.

== Plot ==
Tropic of Orange revolves around seven distinct, yet interrelated characters and story lines (listed in bold below). The story covers the span of seven days, with each day getting its own unit, and with each character getting one chapter for each day.

In Los Angeles, Japanese American television news executive, Emi, and her lover, Latino journalist Gabriel Balboa, are chasing newsworthy stories of local disaster, including an apocalyptic standstill on the Harbor Freeway and the creation of a new urban social order by homeless population moving into the abandoned cars. One of Gabriel's most reliable sources is Buzzworm, an African American man who roams LA streets dispensing advice and help. Buzzworm gives Gabriel a few newsworthy tips, such as the mysterious package arriving at the L.A. airport and the presence of Manzanar Murakami, a Sansei and former doctor who conducts freeway traffic from an overpass as if they were symphonies.

Gabriel also owns a home near Mazatlán, Mexico, which is being tended by Mexican American Rafaela Cortes during her separation from husband Bobby Ngu. Gabriel's Mexican home is the site of early anomalies that become increasingly visible and widespread as the novel progresses, including a special orange that falls from Rafaela's favorite tree at the home. This orange is picked up by the mystical Arcangel, who carries the fruit across the U.S.-Mexico border and, with it, the Tropic of Cancer. Rafaela also overhears a conversation between two men that makes her fear for the safety of herself and her son, Sol. Meanwhile, Bobby, who has been trying to locate Rafaela and Sol, is mysteriously informed of the arrival of a young Chinese girl who may or may not be a cousin of his.

In addition to the mystical orange, the plot includes illegal human organ harvesting in Mexico, a shipment of poisoned oranges from Brazil, a wrestling match between "SuperNAFTA" and "El Gran Mojado", a mystical symphony that connects everyone in L.A., and moments in which time and space become distorted.

== Major themes ==
Central to the importance of Tropic of Orange is its work in decentering normative narratives of race and space in Los Angeles and its cultural texts. Asian American literary scholar Ruth Hsu argues that the images of the novel "decenter[s] the dominant Anglo-Euro-American narratives about Los Angeles, the ones that empower and maintain the dominant image of white and Western superiority. And the novel does so by appropriating and redeploying the hegemonic tropes of cartography and geography in ways that map Western colonialism and the buried sites (longitude and latitude figured in the parole of history) of prehistoric rivers, flora, and fauna, and 'native' resistance as well as the ongoing transgressions of African Americans, Asian migrants, Latino/as, just to name a few of the other who have and are inhabiting the geography—in the deep sense—of Los Angeles."

Scholars of third-world women's writing and Chicana/o studies have written about Tropic of Orange as a text that incorporates elements of Chicanismo as it deals with issues of contested geopolitical borders. This has been related to the study of migration and ethnic exclusion, but also in drawing connections to diasporic politics beyond single ethnic, racial, or national groups. Claudia Sadowski-Smith writes, "Yamashita employ[s] the same precolonial myths to simultaneously stress transnational and cross-cultural groups who populate the borderlands."

== Literary significance and reception ==
Tropic of Orange has been generally well-received and praised for its ambition and scope, but criticized for its explicit politics. For example, Janet Kaye for the New York Times, writes that the novel is "fiercely satirical" but "disappoints as it heads for the home stretch, when her playful seriousness too often gives way to pedantic polemics." Sarah LaBrie, book reviewer for the L.A. Weekly describes the novel as "loud, ambitious, far-flung and manic," while designating it as one of the "best L.A. novels." Kirkus Reviews described the text as "an ambitious but cluttered, apocalyptic riff on immigration, the homeless, and NAFTA as the Tropic of Cancer moves north."

The novel has received extensive critical study from literary scholars, especially within the fields of Ethnic American and Asian American literature.
