= Through the Arc of the Rain Forest =

Novel by Karen Tei Yamashita

- First edition
- Author: Karen Tei Yamashita
- Language: English
- Genre: Magical Realism
- Publisher: Coffee House Press
- Publication date: 1990
- Publication place: United States
- Media type: Print (Paperback)
- ISBN: 0-918273-82-X
- OCLC: 21910436
- Dewey Decimal: 813/.54 20
- LC Class: PS3575.A44 T4 1990
- Followed by: Brazil-Maru

Through the Arc of the Rain Forest is the first novel published by Japanese American author Karen Tei Yamashita. Primarily set in Brazil, the novel is often considered a work of magical realism but transgresses many literary genres as it incorporates satire and humor to address themes of globalization, transnationalism, migration, economic imperialism, environmental exploitation, socio-economic inequity, and technological determinism. It follows a broad cast of characters across national borders, from Japan, Brazil, and the United States. The novel was written when Yamashita was in the United States after living nine years in Brazil.

== Summary ==
Loosely following the novela Brazilian soap opera format, Through the Arc of the Rainforest offers brief episodes introducing the major characters that reveal their connections to one another and their relationship to the Matacão. Told from the first-person perspective of a self-conscious extraterrestrial ball that floats six inches from the head of Kazumasa Ishimaru, a Japanese expatriate who relocates to Brazil in search of job opportunities, the novel details the rise and devastation of an Amazonian community after the discovery of the Matacão, a resilient and seemingly magical and impenetrable black substance found on the floor of the rainforest on the farm of Brazilian farmer Mané Pena.

The presence of the Matacão leads to a variety of conflicts that result in several distinct but interconnected plot strands:

1. In the first, pilgrims flock to the site as the Matacão becomes the site of religious miracles.
2. Batista and Tania Aparecida Djapan collude with media outlets, and converge upon the area to make use of it as a site of advertising and media spectacle.
3. Mané Pena becomes a new age healer who heals with broadcast the mysterious nature of the region
4. Corporate entities, manifest as the American conglomerate GGG and its extraordinary representative J.B. Tweep, arrive to explore commercial potential of the site and substance
5. Kazumasa is invited to the Matacão by J.B. Tweep as one of GGG's major stockholders, and becomes a prisoner of the ambitious man

As the threads converge, the area experiences a boom of economic and corporate growth and development. As more people arrive, as more of the Matacão is transformed into commercial products, or used as a site of entrepreneurial opportunity, and Brazil becomes more globally connected the area suffers severe exploitation and deterioration. The characters of the novel then become increasingly isolated and estranged, with the only person finding temporary happiness being the American businessman, Tweep.

Eventually, the narrative reveals that the Matacão is actually a byproduct of industrial waste, and with that the Matacão dissolves and retreats. All of the products and benefits that had been made possible by Matacão vanish.

== List of characters and figures ==
=== Kazumasa Ishimaru ===
Kazumasa Ishimaru is a Japanese railroad engineer and a primary character of the novel. As a child, Ishimaru encounters a sentient alien object that attaches itself to his head. This sentient ball serves as the quasi-omniscient narrator of the novel. Ishimaru and the ball migrate to Brazil after he is displaced as a rail worker with the introduction of new technologies to maintain the national rail system. In Brazil he takes on a job with the São Paulo Municipal Subway System.

=== Mané da Costa Pena ===
Mané Pena is a Brazilian native of the rainforest. He is a farmer on whose land the Matacão is discovered. After the discovery of the Matacão, Mané Pena unwittingly becomes a New Age guru wielding a magic feather that heals.

=== Matacão ===
A rock, made of a plastic-like substance with magnetic properties.

=== Chico Paco ===
Chico Paco is a Brazilian native and pilgrim to the Matacão. He sees news coverages of the Matacão on television and decides that the Matacão must be a divine place. He lives next door to Dona Maria Crueza and her invalid grandson Gilberto. Chico Paco volunteers to make the 1,500 mile trek to the Matacão on foot, and then builds an altar to Saint George on the Matacão at the request of Dona Maria Crueza to fulfill a promise made to Saint George once Gilberto is miraculously healed. This altar stirs controversy amongst local government officials, The Church, and media outlets about the legality of placing an altar on the Matacão. The altar itself then becomes a destination for pilgrims

=== Jonathan B. Tweep ===
J. B. Tweep is a highly efficient, three-armed, corporate bureaucrat working for the U.S. corporation GGG. He travels to Brazil to examine the Matacão and its potentials for commercial uses. Rather than viewing his extra arm as a deformity, Tweep was proud of it: "He accepted his third arm as another might accept ESP, and addition of 128K to their random access or the invention of the wheel. As far as J.B. was concerned, he had entered a new genetic plane in the species. He even speculated that he was the result of Nobel prize-winning sperm. He was a better model, the wave of the future."

=== Lourdes ===
Lourdes is Kazumasa's Brazilian maid and a single mother. She becomes Kazumasa's lucky charm and he attributes his sudden increase in wealth (via winning lottery tickets) to her. Kazumasa later realizes he has feelings for Lourdes.

=== Michelle Mabelle ===
Michelle Mabelle is a highly competent French Ornithologist who travels to the Matacão to study the local birds and the magical feathers. She surrounds herself with a menagerie of exotic birds that she names and treats as children. She becomes the object of affection for J. B. Tweep, who thinks she is his perfect match because of her three breasts, which make her a match for his three arms.

=== Batista and Tania Aparecida Djapan ===
This couple are the neighbors of Kazumasa, with whom they share a back porch. They are depicted as a passionate couple that fights constantly. Upon taking in a wounded pigeon, Batista and Tania's relationship shifts from being heated and tumultuous to being a more harmonious one. Their wounded pigeon eventually becomes a faithful carrier pigeon who brings out the entire community to watch his return and read the notes Batista sends with the bird.

== Criticism and significance ==
Although generally viewed as an Asian American text, Through the Arc of the Rainforest has also been an important text for scholars of eco-criticism, media studies, transnationalism, and globalization.

Literary critic Ursula K. Heise, for example, writes of the Matacão:

"As the central symbol of the novel, the Matacão signals not only that there is no such thing as pristine wilderness left, but more decisively that there is no local geography that isn't already fundamentally shaped by global connectivity. The local bedrock that reveals itself to be at the same time global plastic waste functions as a striking trope for the kind of deterritorialization John Tomlinson analyzes, the penetration of the local by the global that leads to the loosening of ties between culture and geography. But Yamashita takes the idea of deterritorialization one step further than Tomlinson in that she describes specifically the local natural environment as global and artificial at the same time. A landscape where digging into the soil leads not to rock or roots but polymer makes implausible any return to nature via the immersion into the local of the kind envisioned by many environmentalist writers. The native soil itself is deterritorialized in Yamashita's vision, turning into a product of human industry and long-distance connections as much as of the geological processes in the immediate vicinity."

The text has also been recognized for its post-colonial critique, as Aimee Bahng situates the book in relation to the purchase of 2.5 million acres of Amazon rainforest in Pará, Brazil, by Henry Ford in 1927 to establish a rubber plantation known as Fordlândia:

"...Yamashita excavates this largely forgotten scene of US imperialism in Brazil and extrapolates from such imperial legacies what might happen to the Amazon when a valuable, rubbery, and possibly alien resource is unearthed during an age of global restructuring. In Through the Arc, disavowed imperial legacies such as Fordlandia resurface in mutated forms that haunt Yamashita's near-future speculations."

== Awards ==
- 1991 - American Book Award
- 1991 - Before Columbus Foundation American Book Award
- 1990 - Janet Heidinger Kafka Prize
