= Rabai al-Madhoun =

Palestinian journalist, novelist and writer

- Born: 1945 (age 80–81) al-Majdal, British Mandatory Palestine
- Education: Alexandria University
- Occupations: Journalist, novelist, writer
- Writing career
- Genres: Fiction, non-fiction
- Notable works: The Lady from Tel Aviv, Destinies: Concerto of the Holocaust and the Nakba
- Notable awards: International Prize for Arabic Fiction (2016)

Rabai al-Madhoun (born 1945) is a Palestinian journalist, novelist and writer. He was born in the village of al-Majdal in Palestine, near Ashkelon in present-day Israel. His family was driven out of Palestine in the 1948 Palestinian expulsion and flight. Madhoun grew up in the refugee camp of Khan Younis located in the Gaza Strip. He went to Alexandria University for higher education, and in 1973 turned to journalism as a career. He was also involved with the Palestinian liberation struggle in the 1970s as a member of the Democratic Front for the Liberation of Palestine, but quit politics in 1980 to focus on writing full-time. As a journalist, he worked in Beirut (Lebanon), Nicosia (Cyprus) and later on in London where he is now based. Currently a British citizen, Madhoun is an editor at the Al-Sharq Al-Awsat newspaper.

His books include both fiction and non-fiction. His debut novel, The Lady from Tel Aviv, was shortlisted for the 2010 International Prize for Arabic Fiction (dubbed the "Arabic Booker Prize"). The novel has been translated into English by Elliott Colla. His third novel, Destinies: Concerto of the Holocaust and the Nakba was awarded the annual International Prize for Arabic Fiction (IPAF) in April 2016.

== Books ==
- The Idiot of Khan Younis (short stories; 1977)
- The Palestinian Intifada (Nicosia-1988) (Haifa-Israel-1989)
- The Taste of Separation (autobiographical novel; 2 editions 2001, 2011)
- The Lady from Tel Aviv (novel; 2009, 8 editions)
  - Website page with reviews
  - The Lady from Tel Aviv
- Destinies: The Concerto of The Holocaust and The Naqba (novel; 8 editions 2015) - 2016 winner, International Prize for Arab Fiction
