= Abdul Rahman Munif =

Saudi writer (1933–2004)

- Born: Abdul Rahman bin Ibrahim al-Munif; May 29, 1933; Amman, Emirate of Transjordan
- Died: January 24, 2004 (aged 70); Damascus, Syria
- Resting place: Dahdah cemetery
- Education: University of Belgrade; University of Paris
- Occupations: Writer, journalist, politician, economist
- Writing career
- Language: Arabic
- Period: 1933–2004
- Genres: Novel, short story, critic, biography
- Notable works: Cities of Salt (1984–1989); Sharq al-Mutawassit (1975)
- Notable awards: Owais Cultural Award (1989)
- Movement: Literary realism

Abdul Rahman bin Ibrahim al-Munif (Arabic: عَبْد الرَّحْمٰن بِن إِبْرَاهِيم المُنِيف; May 29, 1933 – January 24, 2004), also known as Abdelrahman Munif, was a novelist, short story writer, memoirist, journalist, thinker, and cultural critic. He is considered one of the most significant authors in the Arabic language of the 20th century. His novels include strong political elements as well as mockeries of the Middle Eastern elite classes. He is best-known for Cities of Salt, a quintet of novels about how the discovery of oil transformed a traditional Bedouin culture. Munif's work offended the rulers of Saudi Arabia, which led to the banning of many of his books and the revocation of his Saudi Arabian citizenship.

== Biography ==
Munif was born in 1933 in Amman, Jordan, to a Nejdi merchant family. His grandmother was Iraqi. His Story of a City: A Childhood in Amman describes his upbringing there.

In 1952, he moved to Baghdad to study law and later moved to Cairo. He received a law degree from the Sorbonne and a PhD in oil economics from the University of Belgrade's Faculty of Economics. He later returned to Iraq to work in the oil ministry and became a member of the Ba'ath Party. During this time he edited an industry journal called al-Naft wa al-Tanmiya "Petroleum and Development".

He began writing in the 1970s after he left his job with the Iraqi ministry, quit the Ba'ath party, and moved to Damascus, Syria, removing himself from a regime he opposed. He quickly became known for his scathing parodies of Middle Eastern elites, especially those of Saudi Arabia, a country which banned many of his books and stripped him of his Saudi citizenship. He used his knowledge of the oil industry to full effect, criticizing the businessmen who ran it and the politicians they served.

Munif was the author of fifteen novels. The Cities of Salt quintet followed the evolution of the Arabian Peninsula as its traditional Bedouin culture was transformed by the oil boom. The novels portray the history of a broad region, evoking comparisons to William Faulkner's Yoknapatawpha County. The quintet begins with Mudun al-Milh (مدن الملح, Cities of Salt, 1984), depicting the desert oasis of Wadi al-Uyoun as it is transformed and destroyed by the arrival of Western oilmen, a story similar to that of the disrupted village of Chinua Achebe's Things Fall Apart. Much as Achebe described the effects of the arrival of powerful missionaries on a traditional African village, so Munif chronicles the economic, social, and psychological effects of the promise of immeasurable wealth drawn from the deserts of nomad and oasis communities. The quintet continues with Al-ukhdud (1985;The Trench), Taqasim al-layl wa-al-nahar (1989; Variations on Night and Day), Al-munbatt (1989; The Uprooted), and Badiyat al zulumat (1989; The Desert of Darkness). Daniel Burt ranked the quintet as the 71st greatest novel of all time. The last two novels in the series have not been translated into English. In a doctoral study conducted at the University of Oxford, Suja Sawafta argues that Abdulrahman Munif was and remains the only modern Arab novelist to bridge a discursive gap between the literature and culture of the Arab Mediterranean and the Arab Gulf states, owing to his upbringing and intellectual formation in the Levant, his Saudi- Iraqi familial roots, and his work as an oil specialist in Syria and Iraq.

His first novel to appear in English was Endings. The translator claimed it was the first Saudi Arabian novel to be translated into English, and hailed its innovative portrayal of rural life and environmental challenges in an Arabic genre which had, until then, focused mostly on urban, middle-class experiences. While Munif's works were never particularly successful in the West, throughout the Middle East they are critically acclaimed and extremely popular. Cities of Salt was described by Edward Said as the "only serious work of fiction that tries to show the effect of oil, Americans and the local oligarchy on a Gulf country."

While he was one of the fiercest critics of Saddam Hussein and his regime, he was utterly opposed to the American invasion of Iraq and spent the last two years of his life working on non-fiction projects to oppose what he saw as renewed imperialism. He died in Damascus at the age of 70, of kidney and heart failure.

== Bibliography ==
=== Works translated into English ===
- — 1987. Cities of Salt (Cities of Salt Trilogy, Vol 1), New York: Vintage Books. ISBN 0-394-75526-X
- — 1991. The Trench (Cities of Salt Trilogy, Vol 2), New York: Vintage Books. ISBN 0-394-57672-1
- — 1993. Variations on Night and Day (Cities of Salt Trilogy, Vol 3), New York: Vintage Books. ISBN 0-679-75551-9
- — 1998. Endings, London: Quartet Books. ISBN 0-7043-2651-5
- — 1998. Story of a City: A Childhood in Amman, London: Quartet Books. ISBN 0-7043-8023-4

=== Works in Arabic ===
Fiction

- — 1973. Al-ashjar wa-ghtyal Marzuq الأشجار واغتيال مرزوق, Beirut: al-Muassasa al-Arabiyya lid-Dirasat wan-Nashr.
- — 1974. Qissat hubb majusiyya قصّة حبّ مجوسية, Beirut: al-Muassasa al-Arabiyya lid-Dirasat wan-Nashr.
- — 1975. Sharq al-Mutawassit شرق المتوسّط, Beirut: al-Muassasa al-Arabiyya lid-Dirasat wan-Nashr.
- — 1976. Hina tarakna al-jisr حين تركنا الجسر, Beirut: al-Muassasa al-Arabiyya lid-Dirasat wan-Nashr.
- — 1977. An-nihayat النهايات, Beirut: al-Muassasa al-Arabiyya lid-Dirasat wan-Nashr.
- — 1979. Sibaq al-masafat at-tawila سباق المسافات الطويلة, Beirut: al-Muassasa al-Arabiyya lid-Dirasat wan-Nashr.
- With Jabra Ibrahim Jabra. 1982. Alam bi-la kharait عالم بلا خرائط, Beirut: al-Muassasa al-Arabiyya lid-Dirasat wan-Nashr.
- — 1984. Mudun al-milh 1: Al-tih مدن الملح ١: التيه, Beirut: al-Muassasa al-Arabiyya lid-Dirasat wan-Nashr.
- — 1985. Mudun al-milh 2: Al-ukhdud مدن الملح ٢: الأخدود, Beirut: al-Muassasa al-Arabiyya lid-Dirasat wan-Nashr.
- — 1989. Mudun al-milh 3: Taqasim al-layl wan-nahar مدن الملح ٣: تقاسيم الليل والنهار, Beirut: al-Muassasa al-Arabiyya lid-Dirasat wan-Nashr.
- — 1989. Mudun al-milh 4: Al-munbatt مدن الملح ٤: المنبتّ, Beirut: al-Muassasa al-Arabiyya lid-Dirasat wan-Nashr.
- — 1989. Mudun al-milh 5: Badiyat az-zulmat مدن الملح ٥: بادية الظلمات, Beirut: al-Muassasa al-Arabiyya lid-Dirasat wan-Nashr.
- — 1991. Al-an... huna, aw sharq al-Mutawassit marra ukhra الآن... هنا، أو شرق المتوسّط مرّة أخرى, Beirut: al-Muassasa al-Arabiyya lid-Dirasat wan-Nashr.
- — 1999. Ard as-sawad 1–3 أرض السواد ١-٣, Beirut: al-Muassasa al-Arabiyya lid-Dirasat wan-Nashr.
- — 2005. Umm an-nudhur أمّ النذور, Beirut: al-Muassasa al-Arabiyya lid-Dirasat wan-Nashr.

Non-Fiction

- — 1973. Mabda al-musharaka wa-tamin al-bitrul al-arabi مبدأ المشاركة وتأمين البترول العربي, Beirut: Dar al-awda.
- — 1975. Al-bitrul al-arabi, musharaka aw at-tamin البترول العربي، مشاركة أو التأمين, Beirut.
- — 1976. Tamin al-bitrul al-arabi تأمين البترول العربي, Baghdad.
- — 1992. Al-katib wal-manfa – Humum wa-afaq ar-riwaya al-arabiyya الكاتب والمنفى, Beirut: al-Muassasa al-Arabiyya lid-Dirasat wan-Nashr.
- — 1992. Ad-dimuqratiyya awwilan ad-dimuqratiyya daiman الديمقراطية أوّلاً الديمقراطية دائماً, Beirut: al-Muassasa al-Arabiyya lid-Dirasat wan-Nashr.
- — 1994. Sirat madina – Amman fi l-arba'inat سيرة مدينة – عمّان في الأربعينات, Beirut: al-Muassasa al-Arabiyya lid-Dirasat wan-Nashr.
- — 1998. Bayn ath-thaqafa was-siyasa بين الثقافة والسياسة, Casablanca: al-Markaz ath-Thaqafi al-Arabi.
- — 1998. Law'at al-ghiyab لوعة الغياب, Beirut: al-Muassasa al-Arabiyya lid-Dirasat wan-Nashr.
- — 2001. Rihlat daw رحلة ضوء, Beirut: al-Muassasa al-Arabiyya lid-Dirasat wan-Nashr.
- — 2001. Dhakira lil-mustaqbal ذاكرة للمستقبل, Beirut: al-Muassasa al-Arabiyya lid-Dirasat wan-Nashr.

== Obituary ==
- Jiad, Abdul-Hadi (February 5, 2004). "Abdul Rahman Munif". The Guardian.
- Hafez, Sabry (January–February 2006). "An Arabian master". New Left Review. II (37). New Left Review.

== See also ==
- Uyun AlJiwa governorate
- Abdullah al-Tariki
- Jabra Ibrahim Jabra
- Marwan Kassab-Bachi

=== External links ===
- Abdul-Rahman Munif: The Prolific and Renowned Arabic Novelist of Our Time
- endings-al-nehayat-by-abd-al-rahman-munif
