= Ibrahim Aslan =

Egyptian novelist and short story writer

Ibrahim Aslan (1935 – 7 January 2012) (Arabic:إبراهيم أصلان) was an Egyptian novelist and short story writer.

== Biography and work ==
Aslan was born in Tanta in the Nile Delta in 1935, shortly before his family moved south to Cairo in EMbaba( poor city). His father was a Post Office employee, and Aslan too went on to work for the Cairo Post Office. The Cairene neighbourhoods of Imbaba and Kit Kat, where he lived and worked, are closely associated with his oeuvre.

Aslan emerged on the Arab literary scene in the mid-1960s, and is considered to be part of the movement known as the Sixties Generation which also included such authors as Gamal Ghitany, Sonallah Ibrahim, and Abdel Hakim Qasem. The avant-garde literary magazine Galerie 68 published eight of his stories during its short life.

Aslan published two volumes of short stories, three novels, and two volumes of non-fiction during a literary career spanning more than four decades. His first collection of short stories, called Buhayrat al-Masah (The Evening Lake), was released in 1971–72. A second collection called Youssef wal-Rida (Joseph and the Clothes) was published in 1987.

Aslan is best known for his first novel Malek al-Hazin (1983), translated by Elliott Colla under the English title The Heron; and its sequel 16 years later called As-safir al-Nil (1999), translated as Nile Sparrows by Mona El-Ghobashy.

== Awards and honours ==
The Heron was selected as one of the top 100 Arabic novels by the Arab Writers Union and is his most famous work. The Heron was turned into an award-winning film (The Kit Kat, 1991) by leading Egyptian director Daoud Abdel Sayed. More recently, Magdi Ahmed Ali directed a film version under the title Birds of the Nile (2009).

Aslan won a number of literary prizes, including the Taha Hussein Award from the University of Minya in 1989 and the Egyptian State Incentive Prize in 2003–2004. Most recently, he won the 2006 Sawiris Prize for his book Hikayat min Fadlallah Uthman (Stories from Fadlallah Uthman).

Since 1992, Aslan had been famous culture editor at the Cairo bureau of the London-based al-Hayat newspaper. Ibrahim Aslan, who died in early 2012, was awarded the Nile Prize for his works on Saturday. The award is considered the highest literary honour granted by the state; the prize-winner is awarded LE400,000 and a golden medal.

== Haydar Haydar controversy ==
In the summer of 2000, Aslan and fellow writer Hamdi Abu Golail were subjected to a lawsuit by a maverick Islamist lawyer following a campaign of agitation by the newspaper Al-Shaab. In their capacity as editors of Afaq al-Kitaba (Horizons of Literature), a series of modern Arabic classics published under the aegis of the Egyptian Ministry of Culture, Aslan and Abu Golail had decided to reprint A Banquet for Seaweed, a controversial novel by the Syrian writer Haydar Haydar.

== Works ==
- Buhayrat al-Misa’ (Evening Lake) (short stories, 1971–2)
- Yusuf wa al-Rida’ (Yusuf and the Dress) (short stories, 1986–7)
- Malek al-Hazin (The Heron) (novel, 1983, English translation by Elliott Colla, AUC Press)
- Wardiyat Layl (Night Shift) (novella, 1991)
- Asafir al-Nil (Nile Sparrows) (novel, 1999, English translation by Mona El-Ghobashy, AUC Press)
- Hikayat min Fadlallah Uthman (Stories from Fadlallah Uthman) (short stories, 2003)
- Khulwat al-Ghalban (Poor Man's Hermitage) (non-fiction, 2003)
- Shay’un Min Hadha al-Qabil (Something Like That) (non-fiction, 2007)
- Hugratan wa Salah: Mutataliya Manziliyya (Two Rooms and a Hall: A Household Sequence) (2010)
- A Very Old Friend (novel, published 2015 -al-shorouk 2023)
