= Rites of Assent =

Book by Abd Al-Hakim Qasim

Rites of Assent: Two Novellas (Arabic: المهدي وطرف من خبر الآخرة) is a collection of novellas of Abd Al-Hakim Qasim. The two novellas were translated into English by Peter Theroux and published in 1995 by the Temple University Press.

The works were copyrighted 1984 and published by Dâr al-Tanwîr (Arabic: دار التنوير). The short stories are "Al-Mahdi" (Arabic: المهدى) and "Good News from the Afterlife" (Arabic: طرف من خبر الآخرة Turaf min khabar al-âkhira). The settings of both novellas are small Nile Delta villages.

Samia Mehrez of the American University of Cairo wrote the introduction, which includes a biography of the author and a critical analysis of the works.

The title refers to what Judith Caesar of the American University of Sharjah stated as "the assent of those who know better to the voice of convention and their failure to assent to what they know to be the truth." This theme appears in both novellas. Caesar stated that in both novellas "the meaning is not conveyed through rounded characterization, but by what all the relatively flat characters taken together suggest by their actions or inaction." Caesar stated that the Theroux translations were "beautifully written, the language spare, pared-down, precise."

== "Al-Mahdi" ==
The first novella is "Al-Mahdi." In the novella, Awadallah, a Coptic umbrella-maker, moves with his wife and children to the countryside to find work and to stop living on his landlady's charity. He had moved from Tanta, a large city, because the umbrella making trade was outdated in the urban areas. A Muslim landowner named Ali Effendi gives Awadallah charity because the former wants to prove that Muslims have more charity than Christians. Awadallah and his family fear that Ali Effendi will attempt to convert him to Islam but they does not want to offend him, so they accept his charity.

The Muslim Brothers of the community give Awadallah a house, along with other help and then attempt to coerce Awadallah into converting to Islam. One of them man states "From the time the man first came to our town, until this morning, we never let up for a moment." The brothers give Awadallah books on Islam and his mental state deteriorates. Judith Caesar of the American University of Sharjah wrote that the family members "feel more like hostages than guests". M.D. Allen of the University of Wisconsin Center Fox Valley stated that the author believed that the Muslim Brotherhood was "a group of socially disadvantaged hypocrites who mask a will to violence and power behind their religion's call to show charity toward the unfortunate." Caesar wrote that "The Muslim Brothers who bully Awadallah into enacting his supposed conversion are formerly confused and uncertain young men who have found a sense of community and mission in fundamentalist Islam that they want to share with others."

Once Awadallah agrees to convert, he is paraded around the streets. Sheikh Sayid al-Hasari, a Sufi preacher, condemns the forced conversion ceremony. Caesar wrote that the sheikh believed that the men "are utterly unaware that" by forcing Awadallah "they are violating the spirit of their own religion. They are not evil, but mindless." Ali Effendi and the town mayor also condemn it. They do not prevent it from happening. The mayor, who Caesar described as "henpecked", distracts himself from the affair by trying to engage in sexual intercourse with a servant girl, and Caesar states that "the scene of his pitiful sexual impotence with a willing servant girl [is] paralleling his moral impotence." Allen states that the story contrasts the Sufi's "gentle scrupulousness" with the Brotherhood's "aggressive indifference to anything outside their religious/political aims" and that "Awadallah's conversion ceremony is compared, not subtly, to the Crucifixion." Awadallah believes that he is about to re-enact the Stations of the Cross. He dies before he is to arrive at the mosque and his wife makes a Christian prayer over his body.

Caesar stated that the characters are "men who have been given the insight and the opportunity to act nobly, but they fail to do so because this action would bring them into conflict with popular opinion." According to Caesar, in regards to the characters "The guilty and the innocent are not so easily distinguished from one another, but it is those who betray what they know to be true who lose the most." Caesar argues that "Qasim presents these characters as well with neutral sympathy."

In his English version Peter Theroux used the original Arabic title, and Caesar stated that he "wisely does not attempt to translate it". Caesar stated that the plot summary "suggests" that the novella is a "plea for religious tolerance" but she stated that the novella "is much more than" that.

== "Good News from the Afterlife" ==
The second novella is "Good News from the Afterlife." The main characters include an elderly man and his grandson. The elderly man on the outside appears, in the words of Caesar, as "respectable", "saintly and otherworldly" and he holds "a reputation for learning and piety". In fact he has bitterness and resentment. Caesar stated that the grandson "seems to represent" an alter ego of the elderly man and that he would be "the person the grandfather could have been if he had not become so involved in the petty quarrels and spites of village life."

The novella is divided into two sections. The first section is told in the point of view of the grandson and explores the grandfather's character. Allen stated that the section includes "the ruminations of a bookish and sensitive boy" and the boy's "sun-struck hallucinations".

At one point the grandfather dies. During the second section two angels perform a judgment of the life of the grandfather. In regards to the angels Allen characterized them as "[m]outhpieces of their human creator" and he added that "they do not convince as transcendent representatives of a world religion" and that the angels "do not have the gift of light disquisition". They have a conversation with the grandfather who, in the words of Caesar, "begins to understand how he failed to understand and to love the people around him, and how he betrayed his own sense of himself."

The story revealed that the old man wanted to love his cousin but she disliked him. He chose to close himself off to his wife and focus on religious studies due to his unwillingness to love his wife. In addition, he was afraid of acting in a manner unacceptable to society and admitting that he was angry at his father. Allen stated "We are enabled to re-create the latter's life as he acquires the serenity and wholeness of knowledge that come with death." Caesar stated that "Now the chance he once had for an authentic life is gone and his life is over. His punishment, if punishment it is, is knowing that."

== Reception ==
Caesar wrote that the novellas were "not just a blending of village Sufism and the existential philosophies of post-war Europe, but a uniquely personal and original vision of what man is and should be" and that they were "intensely lyrical, intellectually provocative, and philosophical".

Allen argued that the novella "Good News from the Afterlife" has "a final impression of irritating pretentiousness" and that compared to "Al-Mahdi" it "is more ambitious and less successful." He criticized the portions of the story dealing with the boy and "the reader's - or this reader's - inability to decide what actually happens".
