= Questions 27 & 28 =

2026 novel by Karen Tei Yamashita

- Author: Karen Tei Yamashita
- Language: English
- Genre: Historical fiction, literary fiction
- Publisher: Graywolf Press
- Publication date: April 28, 2026
- Pages: 464
- ISBN: 978-1-64445-381-0

Questions 27 & 28 is a novel by American writer Karen Tei Yamashita, published by Graywolf Press. It was released on April 28, 2026.

== Synopsis ==
The novel chronicles the experiences of Japanese Americans before, during, and after their internment during World War II, structured around the loyalty questionnaire that internees were required to answer in order to be considered for release.

== Title ==
The title refers to two questions on the American government's loyalty questionnaire distributed to Japanese Americans held in internment camps during World War II. Question 27 asked whether internees were willing to serve in combat on behalf of the American military, while Question 28 asked them to renounce allegiance to the Japanese emperor.

== Critical reception ==
Publishers Weekly gave the novel a positive review, calling it an "innovative polyphonic novel" in which Yamashita "blends archival documents with fictional flourishes," as well as "a powerful and lively novel that documents the turmoil endured by internees while raising enduring questions about identity, loyalty, and citizenship."

Kirkus Reviews described the book as "an ambitious novel that spans many forms, ably crossing oceans and centuries," praising the novel's engagement with the history of internment and concluding that "what happened will be remembered, and people will learn the lessons of the past."
