= The Land of Darkness (novel) =

1999 novel by Abdul Rahman Munif

- Author: Abdul Rahman Munif
- Language: Arabic
- Published: 1999
- Publication place: Iraq

The Land of Darkness is a book by Abdul Rahman Munif published as a trilogy novel in the year 1999. It mainly focused on the personal Iraqi interactions with global events. However, the defeat of Napoleon in Egypt, remaining the thought of French Revolution. The English ambitions in the Middle East as it is the power of the Caliphate. Not to forget that it touched on the social and political history of Iraq during the nineteenth century.

== Parts ==
The first part revolves around Daoud Basha and how he got is state chair. Showing the methods of governance in Mesopotamia as all the characters revolved in the Sarai. Unlike the second part, which was liberated from and went out to the streets of Baghdad. Next, he followed the journey of the British Council (Ritch), who was the second main character. However, Bardi's character was the most important character specifically in this part, because it was, she who transformed most of the events from Baghdad to Kirkuk. In the third part, he was assured of his rule through campaigns on both the North and South rebels. In addition, he entered a conflict with the British Council. He did not find a way to prevent the rise of the Basha except by threatening the British military intervention. The annual flood of Tigris and the unresolved conflict between Daoud Basha and the British Council is how the novel ended.

This novel was from the last novels that was written by Abdul Rahman Munif (1999–1997) and what makes it stands out. Some considered it an attempt to return to childhood, especially that he dedicated this work to his mother Noura who instilled the love of Iraq in him. As he added in his novel the Baghdadi dialect in all its daily details, moreover he added the Iraqi view, whether at the level of the ruler generally. Munif tried to say that the history of Iraq applies to history repeats itself. However, one of the critics said that this event in (The Land of Darkness) is Iraq.
