= Samia Mehrez =

Egyptian academic

- Born: 1 January 1955 (age 71); Egypt
- Education: PhD in Comparative Literature from the University of California in 1985
- Occupations: Professor; literary critic; researcher

Samia Mehrez (Arabic: سامية محرز) is an Egyptian professor of contemporary literature, literary critic, and researcher, who was born on 1 January 1955. She is President of the Center for Translation Studies at the American University in Cairo. Mehrez has played a major role in publishing articles on translation, contemporary Arab literature, post-colonial studies and various cultural topics.

== Education ==
She received many certificates of recognition and has a number of publications and articles. She received a Bachelor of Arts degree in English, Comparative Literature, and Drama from the American University in Cairo in 1977, and a Master's of Arts degree in Comparative Literature from the same university in 1979, as well as a PhD in comparative literature from the University of California, United States in 1985.

== Life ==
She occupied several positions, she was the President of the Center for Translation Studies at the American University in Cairo and professor of Arabic Literature at the Department of Arab and Islamic Civilizations at the same university. In addition, she was an assistant professor of Arabic Language and Literature in Cornell University, United States (1984-1990). She currently teaches modern Arabic literature and gives lectures in translation studies and theories at the Department of Islamic and Arab Civilizations of the American University in Cairo.

Mehrez speaks five languages: Arabic, English, French, Italian and Spanish. She participated in numerous international conferences and workshops, including: Translation and Activism Forum at the University of Granada, Spain, Pre-Modern Performance in the Eastern Mediterranean Countries Conference, Istanbul, and the Nation and Translation Workshop at the European Academy in Berlin.

Mehrez specializes in comparative English literature, drama, and modern Arab literature. She also happens to be Ibrahim Nagi's granddaughter.

== Works ==
- “Egyptian Writers Between History and Storytelling: Articles on Najib Mahfouz, Sonallah Ibrahim and Gamal al-Ghitani.” (American University in Cairo Publications, 1994 and 2005).
- “Egypt’s Culture Wars Between Politics and Practice.” (Routledge Publishing, 2008 and American University in Cairo Publications, 2010).
- “Cairo Literary Atlas: A Hundred Years on the Streets of Cairo.” (2010)
- “Cairo's Literary Life: A Hundred Years in the Heart of the City.” (2011)
- “No more Chit Chat on the Nile,” Ahram Weekly, December 13–19, 2001. (English)
- “The Day the Leader was Killed by Naguib Mahfouz,” trans. Ibrahim Fathi, Akhbar al-Adab, October 22, 1994. (Arabic)
- “De L'Or de Paris aux Mille et un ecrivains du Caire,” introduction; “Gamal Ghitani,” “Salwa Bakr,” bio-bibliographies, Belles Etrangères: Egypte (Ministère de la Culture: Paris, 1994). (French)
- “Under Egyptian Eyes,” introduction to the catalog for the collective exhibit Occidentalism, curated by Karim Francis, Cairo, May 2007.
- “What I did not Tell Edward: Homage to Edward Said,” in Al-Adab, November, 2003.
- “Three Papers for Latifa al-Zayyat,” Akbar al-Adab, 1997. (Arabic)
- “The Document of Incrimination: A Reading of the Al-Khubz al-Hafi Crisis,” in Al-Adab, November, 2002. (Arabic)
- “Ibrahim Nagi: A Rekindling Long Overdue” (Dar al-Shorouk, 2021).

== Awards ==
- Nominated for Woman of the Year Award, University of California, Berkeley (1982).
- Society for the Humanities, Cornell University – United States (1987).
- Edith Krieger Distinguished Visiting Professor, Northwestern University (1992).
- She was nominated for Genevieve McMillan-Reba Stewart Chair, MIT – United States (1996).
- Social Research Center Fellowship, American University in Cairo (1999).
- She was on the Who's Who list for 2000.

== See also ==
- Coat of arms of Egypt
- Naguib Mahfouz Medal for Literature
- Rites of Assent
- Ibrahim Nagi
