= Marwan Kassab-Bachi =

German-Syrian painter (1934–2016)

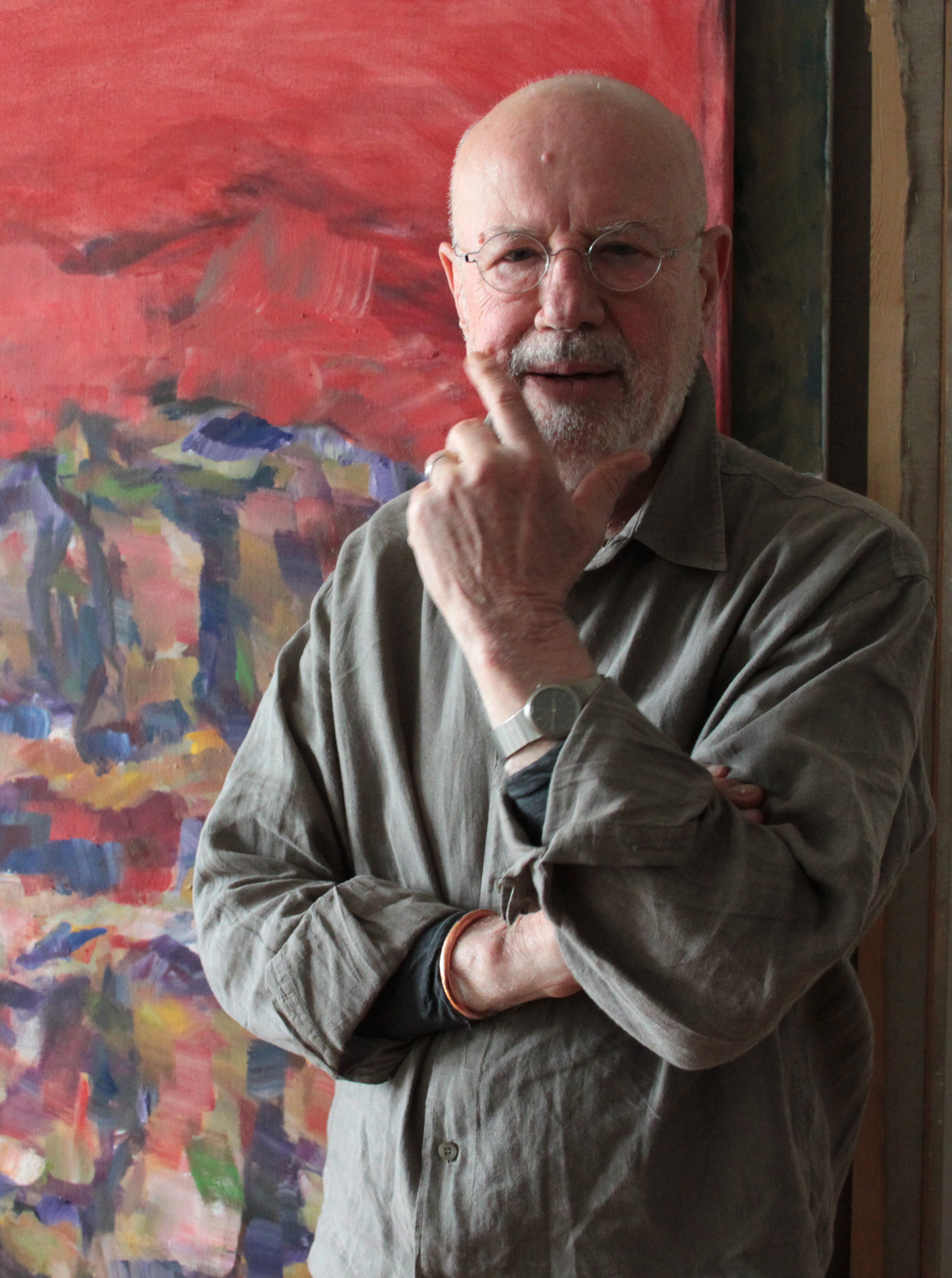
- Marwan in 2012
- Born: 1934; Damascus, Syria
- Died: 23 October 2016 (aged 81–82); Berlin, Germany
- Other name: Marwan

Marwan Kassab-Bachi (Arabic: مروان قصاب باشي; commonly known as Marwan; 1934–2016) was a Syrian painter. Born in Damascus, he first studied at Damascus University before moving to Berlin, Germany, where he enrolled in the Hochschule der Bildenden Künste Saar. He stayed there for most of his life, and was appointed full professor in 1980.

Marwan's work can be found in public collections worldwide, including the Centre Pompidou in Paris, the Museum of Modern Art in New York City, the Tate Modern and British Museum in London, the Carnegie Museum of Art in Pittsburgh and the Museum of Contemporary Art Chicago, among others.
