= Idris Ali (writer) =

Egyptian author

Idris Ali (1940 – November 30, 2010) was an Egyptian author of Nubian origin.

== Biography ==
Idris Ali was born in Aswan in Upper Egypt and studied at Al-Azhar University. Ali spent large parts of his life in poverty, as recounted in his autobiography Below the Poverty Line. He worked for a construction company for low wages when the income from his writings proved to be insufficient. He also suffered the loss of his son which led to multiple suicide attempts in his later years.

== Literary career ==
He published his first story in 1969, and eventually wrote six novels and three short story collections. Among his best-known works are Dongola and Poor, both of which have been published in English by the AUC Press, in translations by Peter Theroux and Elliot Colla respectively. Theroux's translation of Dongola received the Arkansas Arabic Translation Award in 1997.

Ali's work dealt largely with life in his native Nubia. He was a strong voice against the poverty and deprivation suffered by the Nubian people, and he protested against the loss of native land caused by the building of the Aswan High Dam in the 1960s and 70s. He lived in Libya between 1976 and 1980, and his last book The Leader Having a Haircut (2010) caused considerable controversy when it was banned at the 2010 Cairo International Book Fair due to its critical depiction of the Gaddafi regime.

His novel The Explosion of the Skull won the Best Egyptian Novel award in 1999 and led to his meeting President Hosni Mubarak.
