= Galerie 68 =

Egyptian literary magazine (1968–1971)

- Editor-in-chief: Ahmed Morsi
- Categories: Literary magazine
- Founder: Ahmed Morsi; Edwar Al Kharrat
- Founded: 1968
- First issue: May–June 1968
- Final issue: 1971
- Country: Egypt
- Based in: Cairo
- Language: Arabic

Galerie 68 (Arabic: جاليري 68, romanized: Gallīrī 68) was an avant-garde literary magazine which was headquartered in Cairo, Egypt. The magazine existed in the period 1968–1971 with a one-year interruption and produced a total of eight issues.

== History and profile ==
Galerie 68 was founded in Cairo by a group of ten Egyptian artists, including Ahmed Morsi and Edwar Al Kharrat. The other figures linked to the magazine were Bahaa Taher, Sonallah Ibrahim, Ibrahim Aslan and Yahya Taher Abdullah. The first issue was dated May–June 1968. Morsi was the editor-in-chief in the early issues, but later assumed the role of artistic editor and supervisor.

It frequently featured short stories, and each issue was controlled by the Ministry of Culture. Ahmed Morsi reports that two ministers, Tharwat Okasha and Badr Al Din Abu Ghazi, were very flexible and tolerant about the content of the magazine. However, later the license of the magazine was revoked by the ministry in 1970. Although the publication resumed, it folded in 1971 after publishing eight issues. Of its ten founders only Ahmed Morsi continued to work for the magazine until the last issue.

== Mission and content ==
Galerie 68 was started as a protest over the defeat of Egypt in the war against Israel in 1967 and offered several aesthetic solutions to this incident. However, it did not function as a political organ. Instead, the magazine was a publishing platform for those whose writings and work were not accepted for publication in the mainstream magazines.

In addition, Galerie 68 was a forum for experimental literary forms. The founders of the magazine declared that it would not follow the established literary genres. Therefore, it did not support two dominant literary approaches in Egypt at that period: namely, the Romanticism adopted by Ihsan Abdel Quddous and Abdel Halim Abdellah and the Realism represented mainly by Naguib Mahfouz and Yusuf Idris.

Galerie 68 featured translations from Vietnamese literature which was very common among the Arabic literary magazine of the period.
