= Alexandria Museum of Fine Arts =

Museum in Alexandria, Egypt

Coordinates: 31.1950°N 29.9136°E

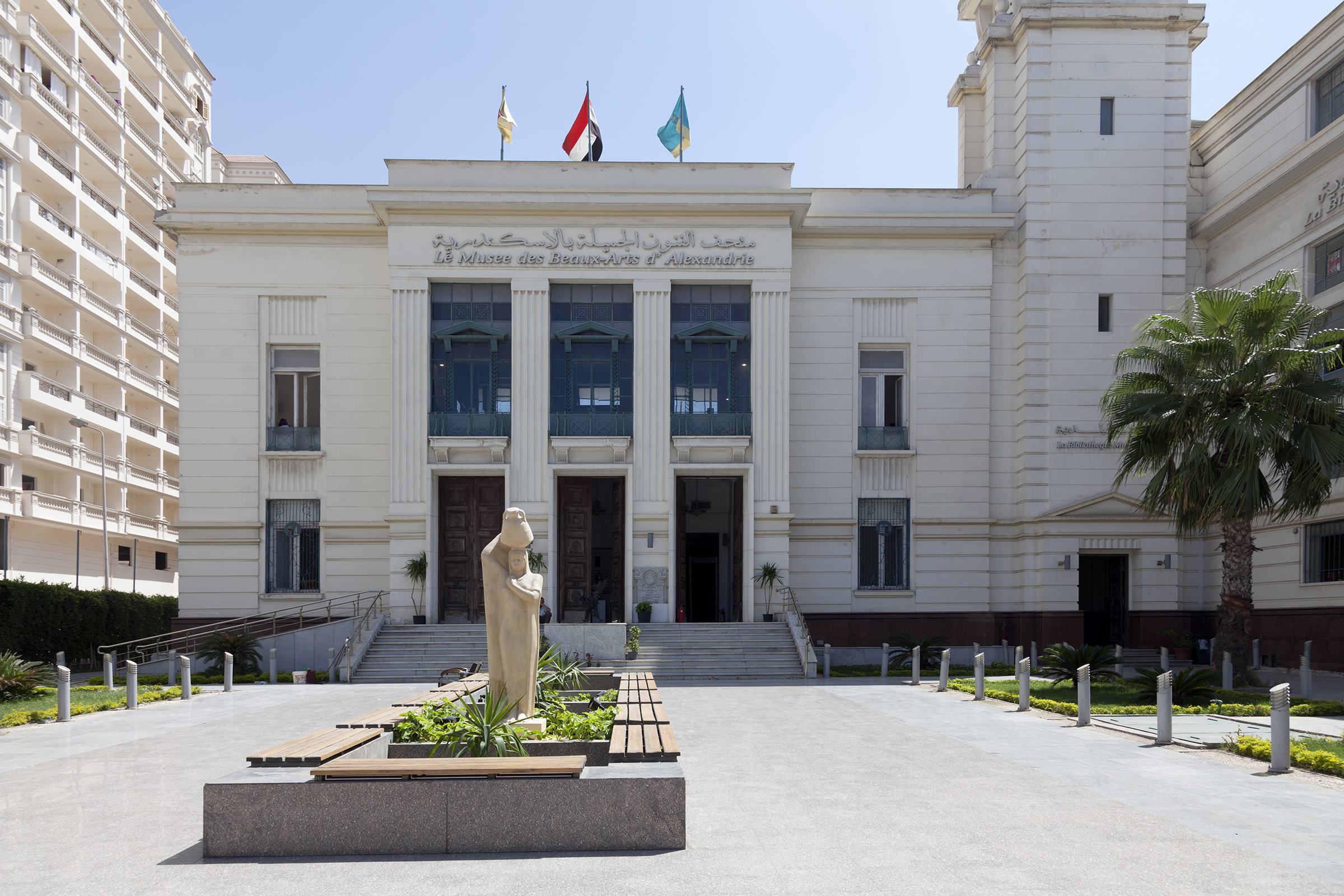
- Museum entrance
- Established: 1904
- Location: Alexandria, Egypt
- Type: History museum

The Alexandria Museum of Fine Arts is a museum for Egyptian and Middle-Eastern fine art in Alexandria, Egypt. Located in the Moharam Bek neighborhood, it houses a collection of works by Egyptian artist and a selection of works from Baroque, Romanticism, Rococo and Orientalism.

In addition, noteworthy examples of carving, printing and sculpture from Egyptian and European artists. The museum aims to promote art to the local community and to a greater extent Egyptian society, through a selection of activities: art workshops, exhibitions and museum education for children; exhibitions for noted Egyptian artists and international cultural exchange activities.

== History ==
The museum was established in 1904 when Alexandria Municipal Authorities received a collection of paintings as a gift from Edward Farid Heim. The collection consisted of 210 pieces by international artists. Heim stipulated the establishment of a dedicated building for presenting these artworks; he would have otherwise taken them back to his homeland Germany. In 1936, French trader, Baron de Menasha, donated a villa in Alexandria's Moharram Bek area to be used as a library and a gallery for the exhibition of artworks. The building was destroyed in the Second World War and the municipality had to store the artworks in another location until another museum had been established.

In 1952, Egyptian architect Foad Abd Elmageed was assigned by the general manager of Alexandria's municipality Hussein Sobhy to design the Museum of Fine Arts. It was built in a modernist style and included several gallery spaces, an art library, and a cultural centre used for concerts and seminars. In 1954, the Revolutionary Command Council opened the museum, choosing a date that coincided with the second celebration of July Revolution. On July 26, 1955, the Egyptian president Gamal Abd El-Nasser opened the initial session of the Mediterranean Countries Biennale. Founded by the general manager of Alexandria municipality Hussein Sobhy, it is the second oldest Biennale worldwide that has been held in the museum till date.

In January 2013, the museum reopened after renovation work that added a workshop, an artists' residence building, a calligraphy museum, a rear garden, and a hall for temporary exhibitions named after the Alexandrian artist Hamed Ewes.

== The Collection ==
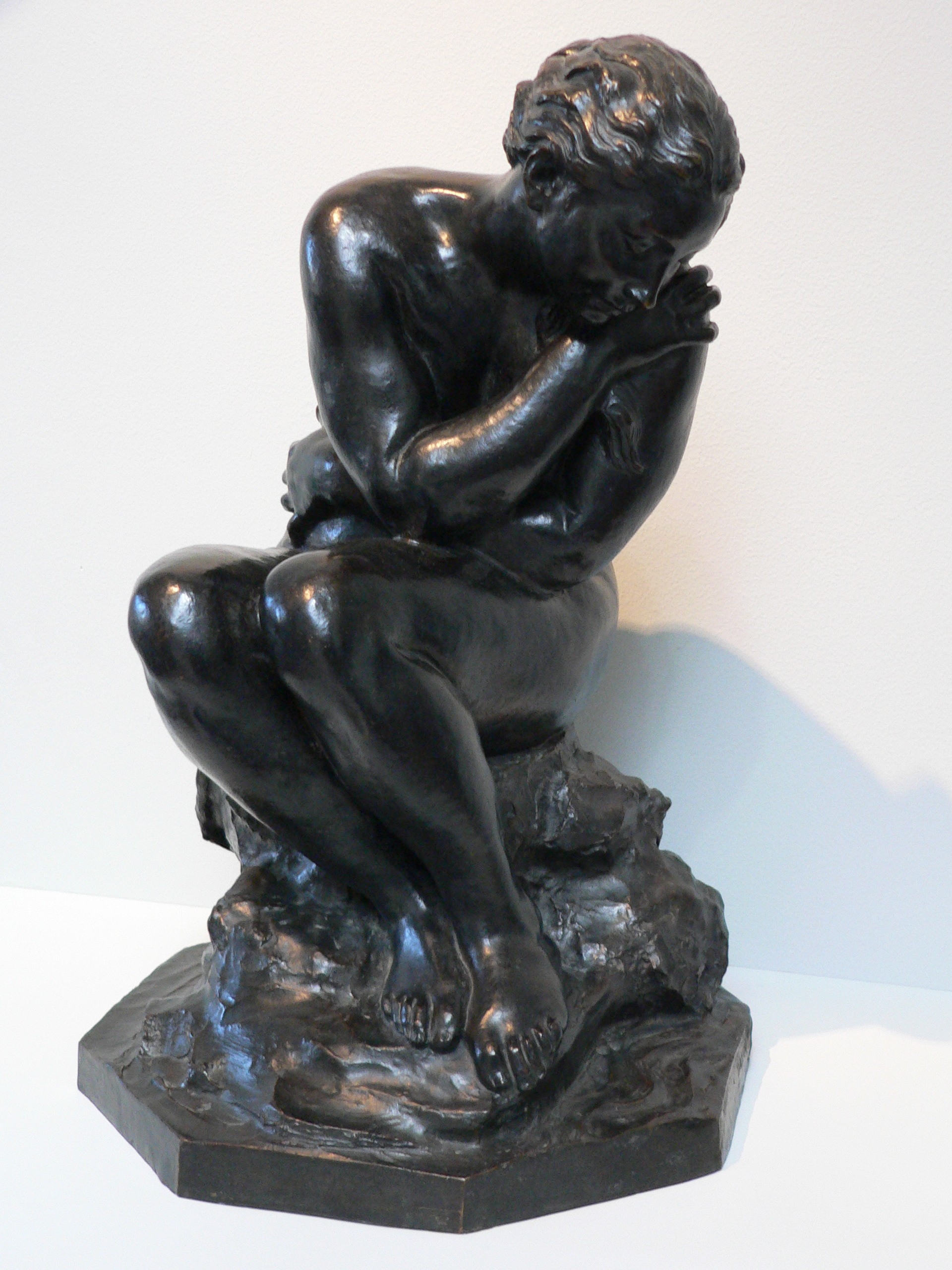
The Bather

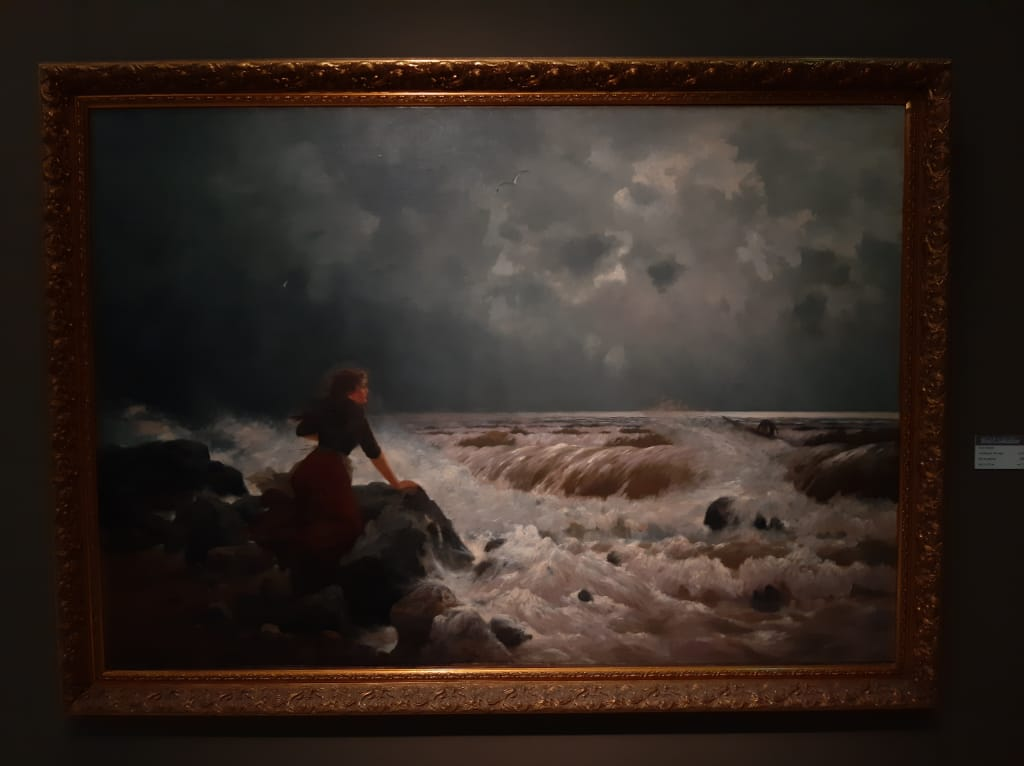
painting

The museum's collection is divided into three groups: the first belongs to Heim's 210 artworks. The second group is Orientalist paintings that are exhibited in a separated hall on the second floor, donated by the artist Mohammed Mahmoud Khalil. The third group was donated by the Museum of Modern Art in Cairo as well as other individual collections that were received from Egyptian, international, and Armenian artists who lived in Egypt throughout the museum's history. In addition, the province donated money for purchasing works from other notable artists.
