= Abdel Hakim Qasem =

Egyptian author

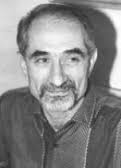
Abdel Hakim Qasem

Abdel Hakim Qasem (Arabic: عبد الحكيم قاسم alternate transliteration: Abd al-Hakim Qasim) (1934–1990) is considered one of the most significant authors in Egyptian literature during the past thirty years.

Judith Caesar of the American University of Sharjah wrote that Qasem was "relatively little-known".

== Biography ==
He was born in Al Bandara village, near Tanta. During the 1950s he moved to Cairo, and began writing until the 1960s when he was imprisoned for four years, for his political associations, by the Nasser government. He lived in exile in Berlin from 1974 until 1985. He then came back to Cairo, where he died in 1990. He wrote five novels, four novellas, five short story collections, and one play.

== Partial bibliography ==
=== Novels ===
- Ayyam Al-Insan Al-Sab'a (The Seven Days of Man)
- Qadar Al-Ghoraf Al-Muqbida (The Destiny of Stifling Rooms), 1982
- Rites of Assent: Two Novellas, translated by Peter Theroux, introduction by Samia Mehrez. Temple University Press, 1995. ISBN 1-56639-354-X
