= Karen Tei Yamashita =

American writer (born 1951)

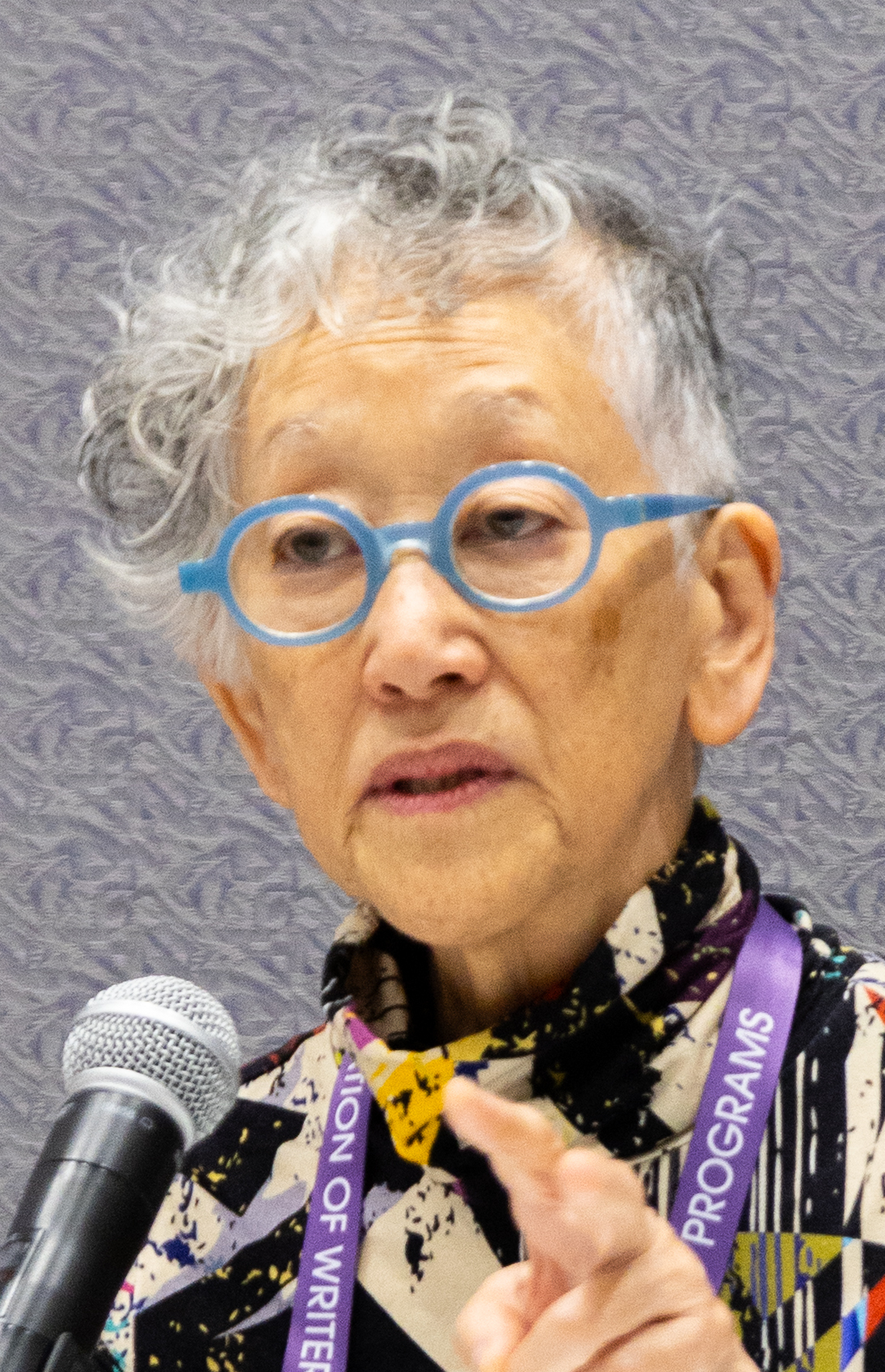
- Yamashita at AWP 2025
- Born: January 8, 1951 (age 75); Oakland, California, U.S.
- Education: Carleton College
- Writing career
- Notable awards: Janet Heidinger Kafka Prize; Medal for Distinguished Contribution to American Letters

Karen Tei Yamashita (born January 8, 1951) is an American writer.

== Career ==
Yamashita graduated from Carleton College. She is Professor of Literature at the University of California, Santa Cruz, where she teaches creative writing and Asian American literature. Her works, several of which contain elements of magic realism, include novels I Hotel (2010), Circle K Cycles (2001), Tropic of Orange (1997), Brazil-Maru (1992), and Through the Arc of the Rain Forest (1990). Yamashita's novels emphasize the necessity of polyglot, multicultural communities in an increasingly globalized age, even as they destabilize orthodox notions of borders and national/ethnic identity.

She has also written a number of plays, including Hannah Kusoh, Noh Bozos and O-Men which was produced by the Asian American theatre group, East West Players.

== Awards ==
In 2009, Yamashita received the Chancellor's Award for Diversity from the University of California, Santa Cruz. She was a finalist for the 2010 National Book Award. In 2011 she was named a Fellow of United States Artists. In 2013 she was co-appointed with Bettina Aptheker as the UC Presidential Chair in Feminist Critical Race and Ethnic Studies; a position offered to distinguished members of the university's faculty intended to encourage new or interdisciplinary program development.

Yamashita was named the recipient of the National Book Foundation Medal for Distinguished Contribution to American Letters in 2021.

== Selected writings ==
- Through the Arc of the Rain Forest. (Coffee House Press, 1990).
- Brazil-Maru. (Coffee House Press, 1992).
- Tropic of Orange. (Coffee House Press, 1997).
- Circle K Cycles. (Coffee House Press, 2001).
- I Hotel (Coffee House Press, 2010).
- Anime Wong: Fictions of Performance, edited with an afterword by Stephen Hong Sohn. (Coffee House Press, 2014).
- Letters to Memory. (Coffee House Press, 2017).
- Sansei and Sensibility: Stories. (Coffee House Press, 2020).
- Questions 27 & 28 (Graywolf Press, 2026).
