= Ling-Chi Wang =

Chinese-American ethnologist (born 1938)

- Born: 1938 (age 87–88); Amoy, Fujian, Republic of China
- Occupation: Professor Emeritus

Academic background
- Education: University of California, Berkeley (B.A.); University of Chicago (M.A.) Hope College Princeton Theological Seminary (Graduate studies)

Academic work
- Discipline: Asian studies Ethnic studies

Ling-Chi Wang is a Chinese-born American civil rights activist and ethnologist. He is a civil rights activist and Professor Emeritus of Asian-American studies and ethnic studies at the University of California, Berkeley.

== Biography ==
Wang was born in Xiamen, Fujian, China on the island of Gulangyu, in 1938 then in 1949 his family moved to Hong Kong and emigrated to the United States in 1957 at the age of 19 to attend Hope College in Michigan.

He received a master's degree in Near Eastern studies from the University of Chicago. However, as a response to the Civil Rights Movement in the 1960s, Wang switched his interests to Asian American studies.

During the 1980s and 1990s, Wang was influential in the field of Asian American studies.

In response to the Wen Ho Lee spying allegations, Wang and an Asian American academic organization instituted a boycott of the two labs run by the University of California, in Lawrence Livermore National Laboratory and Los Alamos National Laboratory in New Mexico. He also helped organize a class-action lawsuit against the labs in response to racial profiling allegations.

Wang led a movement that exposed the involvement of the Taiwan government's role in the murder of Henry Liu in Daly City, California by Bamboo Union agents.

== Analysis ==
In Wang's analysis, the Taiwan government's murders of Henry Liu and Chen Wen-chen were part of a longer history and structure of "dual domination" in which Chinese in the United States were subject both to surveillance by Taiwan's Nationalist government and racially subordinated in U.S. society.

Wang has been called the "Asian Martin Luther King" for his four decades of activism.

== Fight for Affirmative Action ==
In 1969, Ling Chi Wang co-founded Chinese for Affirmative Action (CAA) in San Francisco, which advocated for equal rights, bilingual education, and immigrant communities. His nonprofit civil rights organization advocated for fair housing practices and policies. He supported building the Chinese immersion education program and a community college branch in San Francisco Chinatown so people in the community could take classes close to home. Through his leadership, Wang helped organize community members to challenge unfair systems that limited opportunities for immigrants facing language barriers. He believed language access was important for equality, so he pushed for bilingual education programs and learning spaces where students could also use their native language while learning English.

== See also ==
- Henry Liu
