= Daniel Burt (author) =

American author and literary critic

Daniel S. Burt is an American author and literary critic.

== Career ==
Daniel S. Burt, received his doctorate in English and American literature with a specialization in Victorian fiction from New York University. He taught undergraduate- and graduate-level courses in writing and literature at New York University, Wesleyan University, Trinity College, Northeastern University, Wentworth Institute of Technology, and Cape Cod Community College. At Wentworth Institute of Technology, he served as a dean for almost a decade. During his time at New York University, he was director of the NYU in London program, wherein he traveled with students to Russia, Spain, Britain and Ireland.

Since 2003, Burt has served as the Academic Director for the Irish Academic Enrichment Workshops, which are held in Ireland every summer.

== Bibliography ==
- The Literary 100: A Ranking of the Most Influential Novelists, Playwrights, And Poets Of All Time. Checkmark Books. October 1, 1999.
- The Biography Book: A Reader's Guide To Nonfiction, Fictional, And Film Biographies Of More Than 500 Of The Most Fascinating Individuals Of All Time. Oryx Press. February 1, 2001.
- The Novel 100: A Ranking of the Greatest Novels Of All Time. Checkmark Books. November 1, 2003.
- The Chronology of American Literature: America's Literary Achievements from the Colonial Era to Modern Times. Houghton Mifflin Harcourt. February 10, 2004.
- The Drama 100: A Ranking of the Greatest Plays of All Time. Checkmark Books. December 1, 2007.
- The Handy Literature Answer Book: An Engaging Guide to Unraveling Symbols, Signs and Meanings in Great Works with Deborah G. Felder. Visible Ink Press. July 1, 2018.

=== What Do I Read Next? Series ===
- What Historical Novel Do I Read Next? Gale Cengage.1997.
- What Do I Read Next? 2000, Volume 1 with Neil Barron. Gale Cengage. June 1, 2000.
- What Fantastic Fiction Do I Read Next? 2001, Volume 1 with Neil Barron and Tom Barton. Gale Cengage. June 1, 2001.
- What Do I Read Next? 2003, Volume 2 with Neil Barron and Tom Barton. Gale Cengage. October 17, 20013.
- What Do I Read Next? 2005, Volume 1 with Neil Barron and Tom Barton. Thomson Gale. May 27, 2005.
- What Do I Read Next? 2005, Volume 2 with Neil Barron. Gale. October 21, 2005.
- What Do I Read Next? 2006, Volume 1 with Neil Barron and Tom Barton. Thomson Gale. May 25, 2006.
- What Do I Read Next? 2007, Volume 1 with Natalie Danford and Don D'Ammassa. Gale Cengage. June 8, 2007.
- What Do I Read Next? 2007, Volume 2: A Reader's Guide to Current Genre Fiction with Don D'Ammassa, Natalie Danford, Stefan R. Dziemianowicz, Jim Huang, and Melissa Hudak. Gale Cengage. October 19, 2007.
- What Do I Read Next? 2008, Volume 1 with Natalie Danford and Don D'Ammassa. Gale. May 23, 2008.
- What Do I Read Next? 2009. Volume 1 with Michelle Kazensky, Marie Toft, and Hazel Rumney. Gale Cengage. June 12, 2009.
- What Do I Read Next? 2010, Volume 1 with Neil Barron. Gale. 2010.
