= Coffee House Press =

U.S. nonprofit independent press

- Founded: 1984
- Founder: Allan Kornblum
- Country of origin: United States
- Headquarters location: Minneapolis, Minnesota
- Distribution: Consortium Books
- Key people: Chris Fischbach
- Publication types: Books
- Imprints: Emily Books
- Official website: coffeehousepress.org

Coffee House Press is a nonprofit independent press based in Minneapolis, Minnesota. The press’s goal is to "produce books that celebrate imagination, innovation in the craft of writing, and the many authentic voices of the American experience." It is widely considered to be among the top five independent presses in the United States, and has been called a national treasure. The press publishes literary fiction, nonfiction, and poetry.

== History ==
Coffee House began with Toothpaste, a mimeograph magazine founded by Allan Kornblum in Iowa in 1970. After taking a University of Iowa typography course with the acclaimed Harry Duncan, Kornblum was inspired to turn Toothpaste into Toothpaste Press, a small publishing company dedicated to producing poetry pamphlets and letterpress books. After 10 years of publishing letterpress books, Kornblum closed the press in December 1983; the following year, he moved to Minneapolis, reopened the press as a nonprofit organization, and began printing trade books. Concerned that the press's lighthearted name belied his serious commitment to the press's authors and readers, Kornblum renamed it Coffee House Press.

The press soon began to receive national acclaim. In the early 1990s, books like Donald Duk by Frank Chin and Through the Arc of the Rainforest by Karen Tei Yamashita (a 1991 American Book Award winner) drew national attention and also helped to cement the press's continuing reputation for publishing exceptional works by writers of color. As Kornblum once described it, "Coffee House Press has actively published writers of color as writers, as representatives of the best in contemporary literature, first and foremost—then, only secondly, as representatives of minority communities. That might be one of our most important contributions [to American literature]."

In July 2011, after a two-year leadership transition process, Kornblum stepped down to become the press’s senior editor. Chris Fischbach, who began at the press as an intern in 1994, succeeded him as publisher. In 2015, Coffee House partnered with Emily Gould and Ruth Curry on the Emily Books imprint. Anitra Budd succeeded Fischbach as publisher and executive director in August 2021.

Coffee House has published more than 300 books, with over 250 still in print, and releases 15–20 new titles each year. It has earned a reputation for long-term commitment to the authors it chooses to publish.

The press is currently located in the historic Grain Belt Bottling House in Northeast Minneapolis.

== Books and authors ==
Especially notable books from Coffee House Press include the best-selling Firmin: Adventures of a Metropolitan Lowlife by Sam Savage and National Book Award finalists Blood Dazzler by Patricia Smith (poetry, 2008), and I Hotel by Karen Tei Yamashita (fiction, 2010). Other national award-winning titles include American Book Award winners Somewhere Else by Matthew Shenoda (2006), The Ocean in the Closet by Yuko Taniguchi (2008), American Library Association Notable Book Miniatures by Norah Labiner (2003) and ALA Best First Novels List selection Our Sometime Sister, also by Labiner (2000). In 2011 Coffee House published Leaving the Atocha Station by Ben Lerner, one of the year's most critically acclaimed novels, drawing national and international attention to the press.

Other award-winning Coffee House Press authors include Ron Padgett, Anne Waldman, Frank Chin, Kao Kalia Yang, David Hilton, Laird Hunt, and Brian Evenson.

== Awards ==
Coffee House Press won the 2017 AWP Small Press Publisher Award given by the Association of Writers & Writing Programs that "acknowledges the hard work, creativity, and innovation" of small presses and "their contributions to the literary landscape" of the US.
