= Najlaa Eltom =

Sudanese poet, author and translator

Najlaa Osman Eltom (Arabic: نجلاء عثمان التوم, born 1975) is a Sudanese writer, poet and translator writing in Arabic. She also has translated short stories by other Sudanese literary writers into English. Since 2012, she has been living in Sweden.

== Biography ==
Eltom became part of the literary scene in Sudan during the early 2000s. In 2001, she participated at the International Book Fair in Abu Dhabi, and in 2007 at the Cairo Book Fair and the British Council's Writers Encounter. She published her first poetry collection, whose title translates in English as The Doctrine of Thinness, in Cairo in 2006. In 2016, her second poetry collection was published in Istanbul. The English translations for her poems were published in Banipal magazine 55: Sudanese Literature today. Some of her poems were also published in the anthology Modern Sudanese Poetry by translator and editor Adil Babikir, who commented: “As a female writer in a literary tradition dominated by male figures, Najlaa had to deal with the complex questions of voice, individuality, taboos, image, and performance of a female writer.”

Among other literary texts, Eltom co-translated the Sudanese short stories Isolation by Sabah Sanhouri, Conjunctions by Nagi Al-Badawi and A Condition by Adil Al-Qassas from Arabic into English. In 2018, she published two volumes of short stories in Arabic. The same year, her story The Struggle Is Patriarchal was translated by Yasmine Haj and published in The Babel Review of Translations.

Eltom took a master's degree in English literature at Stockholm University in 2015, studying with a scholarship from the Swedish Institute. In 2019, she received a one-year work grant from Sweden's Writers' Fund.

== Works ==
- منزلة الرمق [The Doctrine of Thinness], Cairo 2006, poetry, OCLC 681602925
- الجريمة الخالدة ذات الأقراط [The Eternal Crime with the Earrings], Juba, 2018, short stories, ISBN 9789776597358
- ألحان السرعة [Melodies of Speed] Juba, 2018, short stories, OCLC 1261768475

== See also ==
- Contemporary Sudanese literature
- List of Sudanese writers
