= Stella Gaitano =

South Sudanese literary writer (born 1979)

- إستيلا قايتانو
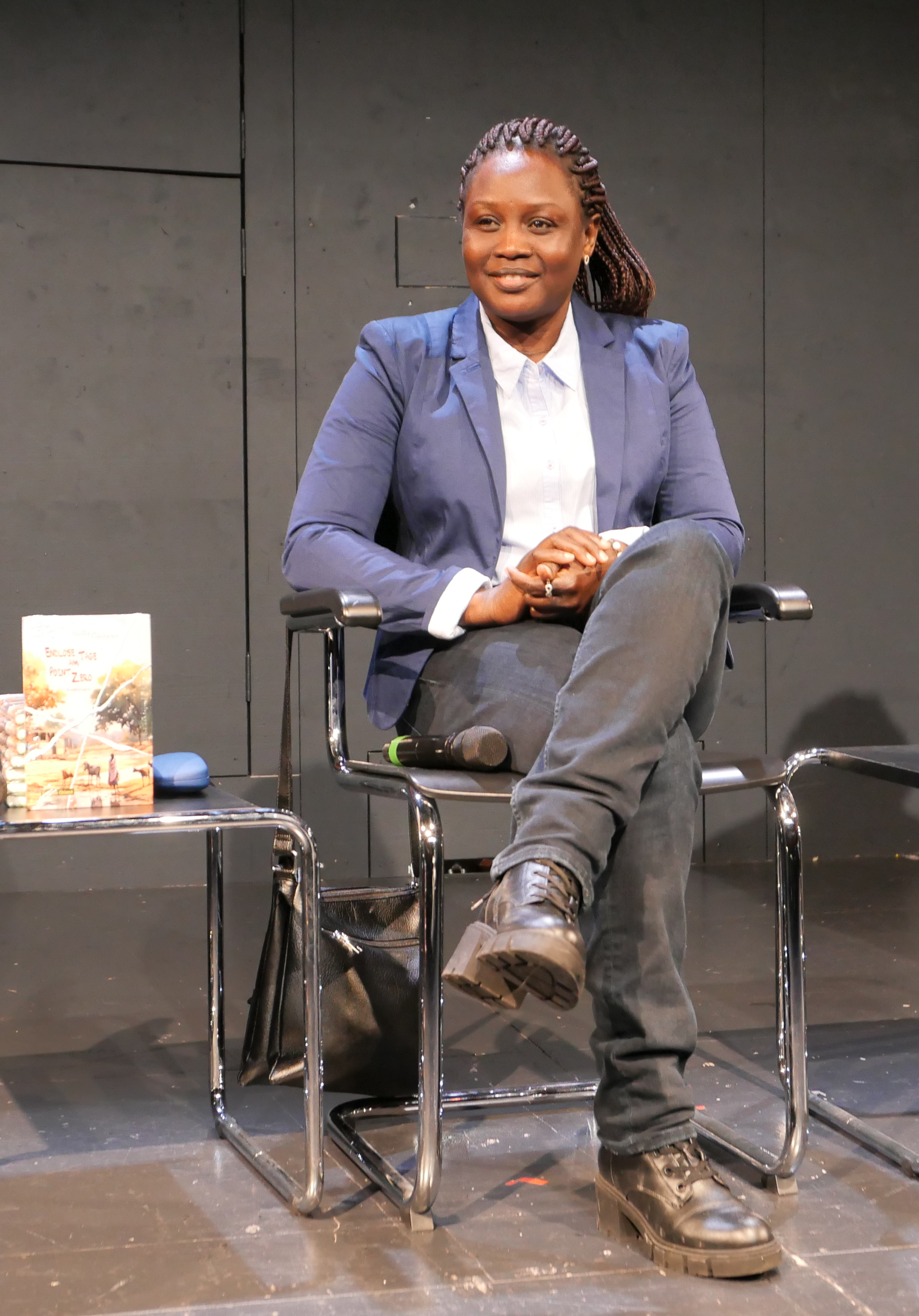
- Gaitano in March 2024 on a panel discussing the topic "Narrating War?" at the Schauspielhaus Zurich
- Born: 17 November 1979 (age 46); Khartoum, Sudan
- Citizenship: South Sudan
- Education: University of Khartoum
- Occupations: Pharmacist and writer
- Writing career
- Years active: 2002–present
- Genres: Short stories, novel
- Notable awards: Ali El-Mek Award, Sudan, PEN International Writers-in-Exile fellowship

Stella Gaitano (Arabic: إستيلا قايتانو; born 17 November 1979 in Khartoum, Sudan) is a creative writer, activist and former pharmacist from South Sudan. She is known for her short stories, often dealing with the harsh living conditions of people from southern Sudan, who have endured discrimination and military dictatorship, war and displacement in the northern part of Sudan. Since the independence of South Sudan in 2011, she has also published short stories about life in her new nation.

Gaitano was named as Writer of Courage by Leila Aboulela, the 2025 winner of the PEN Pinter Prize, with whom the award was shared.

== Life and career ==
Gaitano was born in Khartoum, in 1979, to parents who came from what is now South Sudan. She was three years old when the Second Sudanese Civil War broke out. Stella grew up speaking several languages, including Sudanese Arabic and her parents' native Latuka, a South Sudanese language. After having been exposed to stories in the oral tradition of her family, she learned to read and write in Arabic only at the age of ten or eleven.

At the University of Khartoum, she studied in English and standard Arabic. Gaitano writes in Arabic, even though she has been criticized in South Sudan, where this language has been regarded as a "colonialist tool" of historical northern Sudanese domination. In an article for the New York Times by Sudanese journalist Isma'il Kushkush, Gaitano said: "I love the Arabic language, and I adore writing in it. It is the linguistic mold that I want to fill my personal stories and culture in, distinguished from that of Arabs." She added: "It was important for me that northern Sudanese realize that there was life, values and a people who held a different culture, who needed space to be recognized and respected." Gaitano also said she was inspired to write after reading Sudanese novelist Tayeb Salih, and Arabic translations of Gabriel García Márquez and Isabel Allende.

After having lost her Sudanese citizenship and feeling part of both Sudanese states, Gaitano decided to relocate to Juba, the capital of South Sudan in 2012. There she worked as a pharmacist, while also pursuing her literary career. During her years in Juba, she further served as an activist for humanitarian and educational projects. In 2015, Gaitano had to move back to Khartoum, after having been harassed and attacked due to her criticism of the South Sudanese government for what she saw as its mismanagement, corruption, and its role in the South Sudanese civil war.

In 2022, Gaitano was awarded a fellowship in the PEN International Writers-in-Exile programme in Germany. On 11 September 11 of the same year, she participated in the International Literature Festival Berlin, talking on a panel about contemporary Arabic literature, together with novelist Sabah Sanhouri from Khartoum. Since then, Gaitano has been living in exile in Germany.

In October 2025, Gaitano was named as "Writer of Courage" by Leila Aboulela, winner of the PEN Pinter Prize, awarded by English PEN. On 5 September 2025, Gaitano's second novel Ireme was named as one of the six winners of the first-ever round of "PEN Presents x International Booker Prize," an edition of the English PEN award for sample translations, launched in partnership with the Booker Prize Foundation.

== Literary works ==
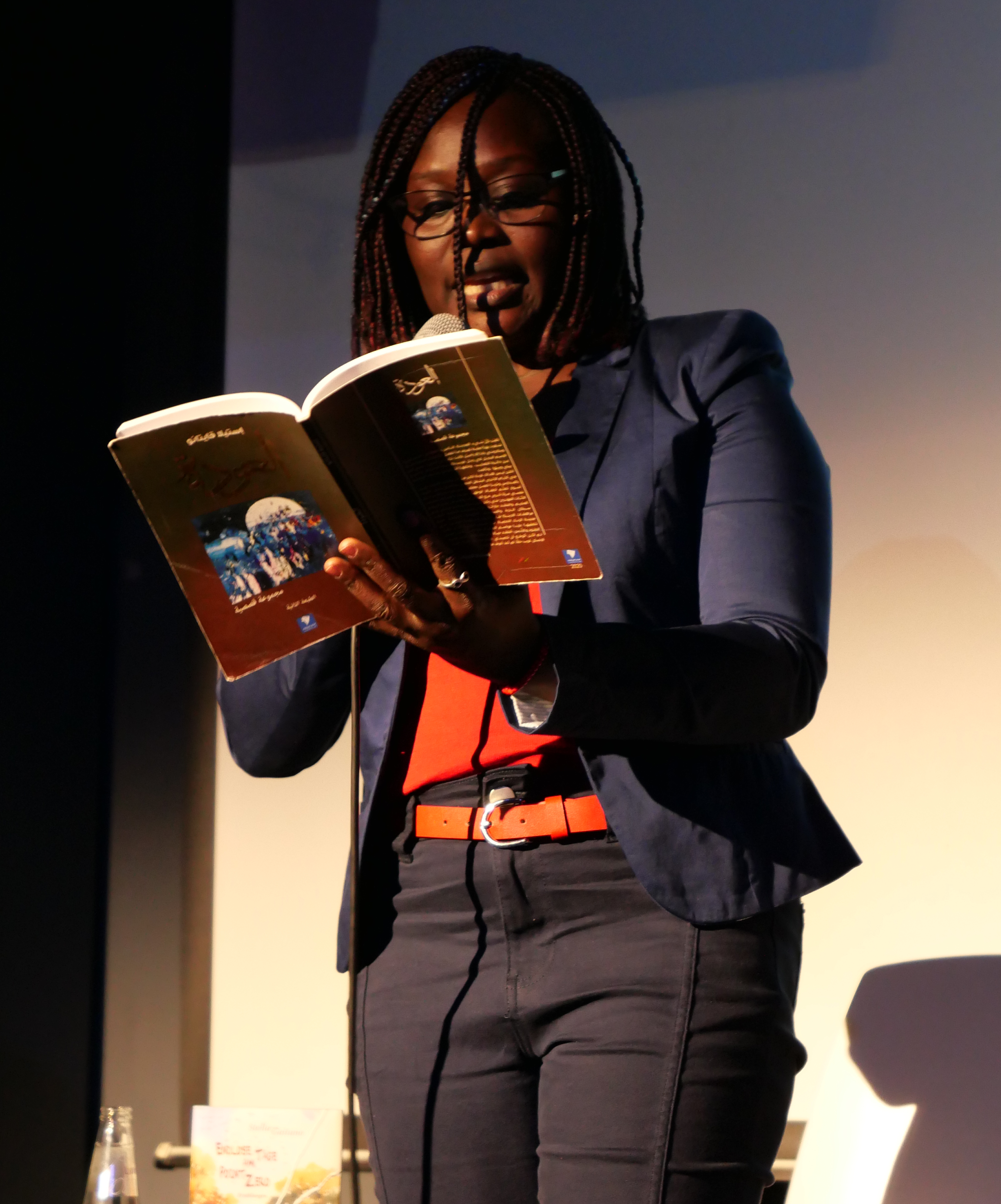
Gaitano in June 2024, reading in the series "Literatures in Exile", organized by the Goethe-Institut in Exile and Media in Cooperation and Transition (MiCT), at the Berlin Kunsthaus ACUD.

Withered Flowers (2002), Gaitano's first short-story collection, tells the stories of people who have been displaced by conflicts in southern Sudan, Darfur, and the Nuba mountains, and were forced to live in camps near Khartoum. She wrote these stories between 1998 and 2002, when she was still a student. According to literary critic Marcia Lynx Qualey, "This early work demonstrates vibrant wordplay, fearless empathy and a deep understanding of storycraft."

In her second collection The Return (2018), Gaitano described the journey of South Sudanese people from the North to their newly created country. She described her characters' expectations and great hopes, and their even greater disappointments. In 2016, her Testimony of a Sudanese Writer was featured in the English literary magazine Banipal's spring edition, titled "Sudanese Literature Today".

For an exhibition for Sudanese painter Ibrahim el-Salahi at the Museum of Modern Art in New York City in 2019, Gaitano was invited to use el-Salahi's Prison Notebook as a source of inspiration for a fictional narrative, and she focused her story "The Rally of the Sixth of April" on a fictional Sudanese photographer documenting the Sudanese Revolution of 2018/19.

In 2020, her Edo's Souls, published in 2018, was the first South Sudanese novel to win the English PEN Writers Translates Award. According to a review in literary magazine ArabLit: "The novel begins across a rural context, in a small impoverished village full of mystery, rituals, and superstition, and it ends in a jam-packed city with all its complications."

== Selected works ==
Short stories

- Withered Flowers, short stories (2002), English translation by Anthony Calderbank
- A Lake the Size of a Papaya Fruit (2003), won the Ali El-Mek Award in Sudan
- The Return, short stories, Rafiki Publishing, Juba (2015), translated by Aisha Musa El-Said
- Everything here boils
- Homecoming
- Escape From the Regular
- I kill myself and rejoice
- The Rally of the Sixth of April (2019) (inspired by Ibrahim el-Salahi's prison notebook, in Arabic and English)
- Des mondes inconnus sur la carte (2009) in French anthology Nouvelles du Soudan
- Endlose Tage am Point Zero. Short stories in German translation (2024). Berlin: Edition Orient, ISBN 978-3-945506-32-5.

Novels

- أرواح إدو. (Edo's Souls), Juba: Rafiki Publishing (2018), English translation by Sawad Hussain (Dedalus Books, 2023) ISBN 978 1 915568 13 7, excerpt in ArabLit magazine.
- إريم (Ireme), Hayat Publishers (2025)

== Critical reception ==
In January 2024, Marcia Lynx Qualey, literary critic and editor of ArabLit magazine, wrote a review about the English translation of Gaitano's debut novel Edo's Souls, titled "Children to fill the entire earth". The story takes place between southern Sudan and Khartoum, spanning several generations from the 1960s onwards. Referring to the many deaths in this novel, Lynx Qualey called it "an epic battle between the forces of Motherhood and Death".

== See also ==
- Sudanese literature
- List of Sudanese writers
