= Mohammed Abdul-Hayy =

Post-colonial Sudanese writer and academic

- محمد عبد الحي
- Born: 1 January 1944; Ad-Damir, Sudan
- Died: 23 August 1989 (aged 45); Khartoum, Sudan
- Education: Khartoum University; University of Leeds; University of Oxford
- Occupations: Poet, literary critic, academic
- Spouse: Aisha Musa el-Said
- Writing career
- Language: Arabic, English

Mohammed Abdul-Hayy or Muhammad Abd al-Hayy (1 January 1944 – 23 August 1989) was a member of the first generation of post-colonial Sudanese writers and academics. Together with Ali El-Mak and Salah Ahmed Ibrahim, he is regarded as a pioneer of modern poetry in Sudan.

== Early life ==
Abdul-Hayy was born in Ad-Damir on 1 January 1944. His father worked as an architect, and his mother was the daughter of an architect. Abdul-Hayy accompanied his father on his travels, which provided him with an understanding of the diverse and multiracial culture of Sudan. These experiences later had a great influence on his poetry, which focuses on the question of identity in Sudan.

== Education and academic career ==
Abdul-Hayy initially studied medicine, but his interests led him to change his area of study to the arts. Abdul-Hayy entered Khartoum University in 1962. Already as a student, articles by Abdul-Hayy were published in Sudanese newspapers, such as Al-Rayaam.

Abdul-Hayy was awarded a Bachelor of Arts from Khartoum University in 1967, and then appointed as teaching assistant in the English department. He got a scholarship and was sent to England, where he was awarded a Master of Arts degree in English literature from Leeds University in 1970. Abdul-Hayy's thesis focused on the Scottish poet Edwin Muir. In 1973, he was awarded a PhD in Comparative Literature from Oxford University. His PhD thesis dealt with the influence of American and English romantic thinking on Arabic poetry. After obtaining his PhD, Abdul-Hayy returned to Sudan, teaching English and comparative literature at Khartoum University. He also served as head of the Department of English from 1978 to 1980.

He died at the early age of 45 on 23 August 1989 in Soba University Hospital, Khartoum.

== Poetry ==
In 1973, Abdul-Hayy released his poem Al Awada alla Sennar (Return to Sennar). It focused on the question of Sudanese cultural identity, and used the historical Kingdom of Sennar as a symbol of African and Arabic coexistence. Upon its publication, Al Awada alla Sennar gained widespread acclaim within the Arab speaking world.

Together with other writers of the early 1960s, such as Ali El-Makk, Al-Nur Othman Abkar, Yusef Aidabi, and Abdullah Shabu, Mohammed Abdul-Hayy is considered as one of the founders of the literary Forest and the Desert School, where "forest" refers to the rainforests of the South and "desert" to northern Sudan.

== Selected works ==
=== Poetry ===
- Al Awada alla Sennar (Return to Sennar) (1973)
- Moaʾalakat al isharat (The Signals) (1977)
- Al-samandal yughanni (The Newt Sings) (1977)
- Hadiqat al-ward al-akhirah (The Last Rose Garden) (1984)
- Allah fi-zaman alʾunf (God in the Time of Violence) (1993)

=== Plays ===
- Ruʾt al-malik (The King's Vision) (1973)

=== Literary criticism ===
- Conflict and Identity: The Cultural Poetics of Contemporary Sudanese Poetry (1967)
- The Angel and the Girl: Necessity and Liberty in Edwin Muir’s Works (1970)
- The Greek Myth in Contemporary Arabic Poetry (1900–1950): Study in Comparative Literature (1977)
- English Poets in Arabic: The Arab Romantics’ Knowledge of English Poetry (1900–1950): A Study in Comparative Literature (1980)
- Tradition and English and American Influence in Arabic Romantic Poetry: A Study in Comparative Literature (1982)
- Vision and Words: A Reading in al-Tijani Yousuf Basheer’s Poetry (1985)

== See also ==
- Sudanese literature
- List of Sudanese writers
