= Ishraga Mustafa Hamid =

Austrian-Sudanese writer and human rights activist

Ishraga Mustafa Hamid (Arabic: إشراقة مصطفى حامد, born 16 September 1961 in Kosti, Sudan) is an Austrian writer, translator, academic and human rights activist of Sudanese origin, living in Vienna, Austria, since 1993. A member of the Austrian PEN-Club, her works mainly deal with her own or other migrants' experiences of displacement, racism or other forms of discrimination.

== Early life and education ==
Mustafa Hamid studied journalism at the University of Khartoum and first worked as a journalist. After the coup d'état of Omar al-Bashir, she emigrated to Austria in 1993 and enrolled at the University of Vienna for another degree in journalism, this time in German. Moreover, she earned her PhD in political science about processes of empowerment of Black women of African descent in Vienna.

== Career ==
After completing her studies, Mustafa Hamid worked as lecturer at the University of Vienna and acted as counselor and researcher for the city of Vienna, focussing on female victims of human trafficking. She also co-founded the 'African Women's Community', wrote studies about racism, sexism and reproductive health issues relating to female migrants and has spoken at conferences and universities.

As a member of the Austrian writers' PEN club, she has edited anthologies and translated contemporary Arabic poetry into German. Further, she translated a story by fellow Sudanese writer Abdelaziz Baraka Sakin, who lives in exile in Austria. In 2015, she edited an anthology of contemporary Arabic poetry, entitled „Symphonie der Rub al-Chali" (Symphony of Rub' al Khali) in her German translation. Further, she is an associate editor of the bilingual 'Words and Worlds' magazine for migrant literature, published in cooperation with the Austrian writers' PEN-Club.

In a video recording of a conference about Arabic literature in July 2021, she named English writer Virginia Woolf and Sudanese novelist Malkat al-Dar Muhammad as early influences on her as a feminist writer.

In 2020, her short story "On the train", where she gives an account of leaving her home town in Sudan, was translated into English by Jonathan Wright and published online by literary magazine The Common, based at Amherst College in the U.S. The 2021 collection of stories Mo(a)t by authors of the Arab diaspora and published by University of East Anglia Publishing Project also presented one of her stories.

As of 2021, Mustafa Hamid has published or edited seven volumes in Arabic and six books in German. In January 2023, her Arabic memoir Woman of two rivers was awarded as one of fifteen books from ten languages a PEN Translates grant.

== Awards ==
In October 2020, she was awarded the "Golden Medal of Merit" by the city of Vienna.

== See also ==
- Sudanese literature
- List of Sudanese writers
