= Ann El Safi =

Sudanese journalist, writer and novelist

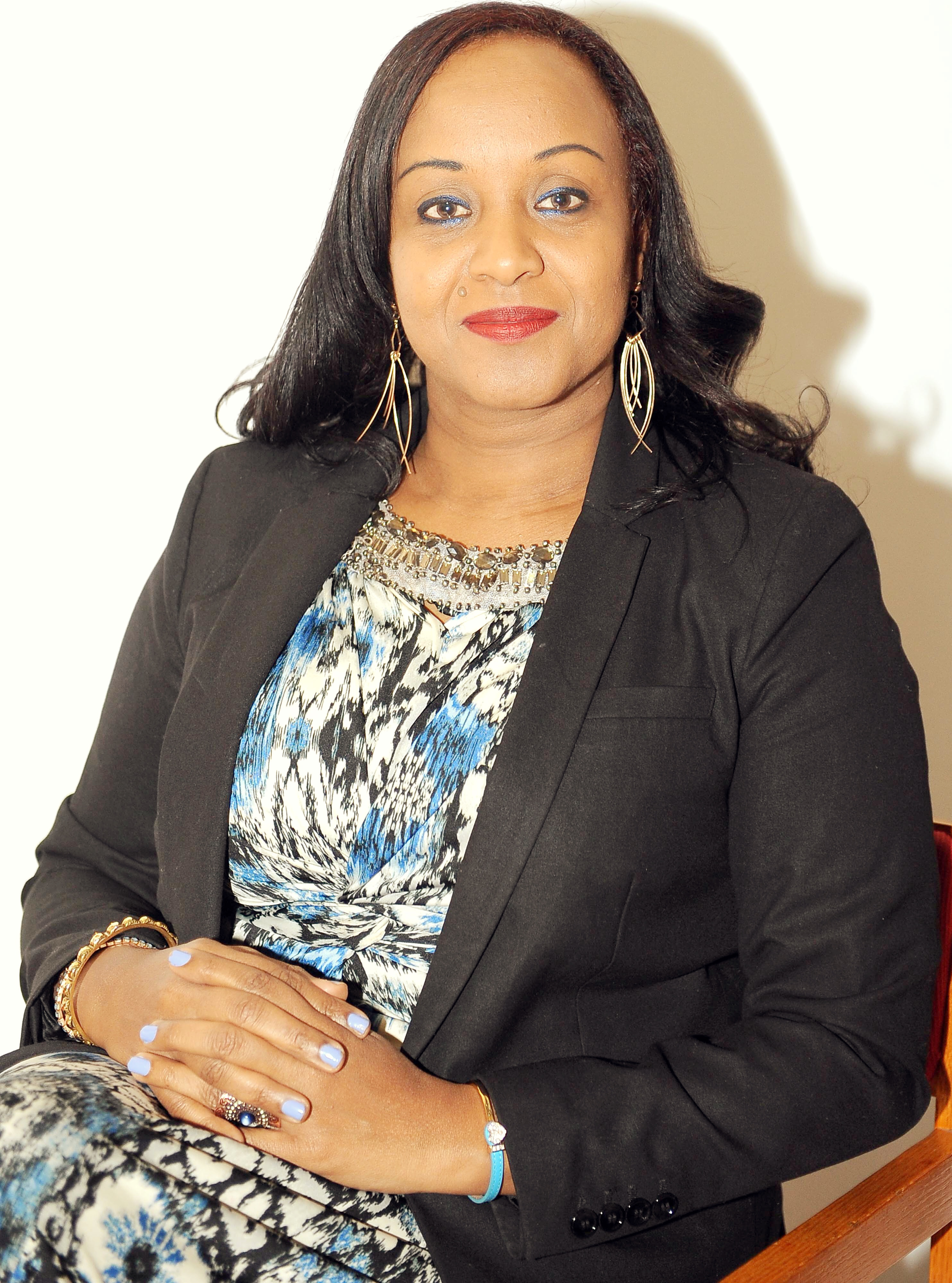
- Born: Sudan
- Education: Eastern Mediterranean University, Northern Cyprus
- Occupations: Journalist, writer, novelist and engineer

Ann El Safi (Arabic: آن الصافي), full name Ann Adil Ya’Seen Hajj El Safi (Arabic: آن عادل يسّ حاج الصافي) is a Sudanese journalist, writer, novelist, and engineer. Up to 2019, she has published poems and novels as well as articles on mass media in modern societies in her native Arabic.

== Life and career ==
El Safi was born in Sudan. She lives between Abu Dhabi and Canada and works as journalist, as well as lecturer and trainer in the fields of development and human resource management.

In 1996, she graduated with a Bachelor's degree in Computer engineering from the Eastern Mediterranean University, and later on worked in the Abu Dhabi branch of Lucent Technologies for seven years. El Safi also studied and graduated from the Poetry Academy in Abu Dhabi. She is a member of the Abu Dhabi-based institution Sea of Culture.

El Safi has published articles and poems across different Arabic and Sudanese publications. For example, her articles "Breath of Words" and "Cultural Attaché" were published in the Sudanese Al-Sahafa newspaper. She also published articles and papers in the Egyptian Al-Hilal magazine. In addition, she contributes to the monthly column titled "Sciences and Letters" in Dar Al Hilal Publishing House's magazine. At different intervals, El Safi also has published articles in the cultural pages of the Saudi Al-Jazeera newspaper, and regular articles under the "Writing for the Future" column in the Algerian Ech-Chaab newspaper.

El Safi has participated in several conferences and events that focused on Arabic and African literature and culture with her research papers. In Al-Qareen's 25th Annual Cultural Festival, she shared a paper titled Modern Media and the Public Opinion: How Media in Modern Societies Affects the Public Opinion. In 2019 she participated in the Moroccan Oyoon Arabic Literature Forum with another study titled "Tolerance as a Building Block for Writing for the Future".

In 2014, El Safi published her first novel titled The Ark of Seduction (Arabic: فُلك الغواية). Thereafter, she published eight more novels. Her novel The Bread of Gypsies (Arabic: خبز الغجر) was published in 2019. There, she treated topics such as society and the economy, the relationships between different cultures and communities, as well as the importance of tolerance, acceptance, and cooperation in societies. In a list of important Sudanese women writers in ArabLit magazine, Sudanese writer Abdelaziz Baraka Sakin recommended El Safi's 2016 novel Kama al-Ruh (Like a spirit).

== Works ==
- The Ark of Seduction! (original title: Fulk Al-Ghawaya!), 2014
- Jameel Nadawand, 2015
- Succession (original title: Tawali), 2015
- The Narrator’s Rhyme (original title: Kafiyat Al-Rawi), 2015
- Like a spirit (original title: Kama al-Ruh), 2016
- Writing for the Future – Part I (original title: Al-Kitaba Lil-Mustaqbal – Al Juz’ Al-Awal), 2016
- Writing for the Future – Part II (original title: Al-Kitaba Lil-Mustaqbal – Al Juz’ Al-Thani)
- It is Him (original title: Inaho Huwa), 2017
- Mirha, 2018
- The Bread of Gypsies, (original title: Khubz al-Gajr), 2019
- Walking On Glass, (original title: Al mashi ala al zujaj), 2022

== Contributions ==
El Safi participated in literary events, including:

- Abu Dhabi International Book Festival for the years (2012–2017)
- The International Abu Dhabi Translation Conference, part of the International Book Festival for the years (2012–2017)
- Sea of Culture Institution, Abu Dhabi for the years (2012–2017)
- Al-Khartoum International Book Festival (2014)
- Bahrain International Book Festival
- Cairo International Book Fair (2017)
- Gave a speech in Fatima Al-Oliani's Salon in Oman (2016)
- Participated in the events hosted by the General Permanent Office of Arabic Writers and the Arabic Novel for the years (2014–2015)
- ٍSharjah story-telling forum for the years (2016–2015)
- A symposium in the Buthaina Khudr Mekki Centre for Innovation and Enlightenment (2016)
- Al Fada’at Publishing Forum in Jordan (2014)
- Attended as a guest in several symposiums organized by the Emirati Writers Union in Sharjah and Dubai for the years (2012–2017)
- Won the Al-Tayeb Salih International Creative Writing award in second place (2022)

== See also ==
- Sudanese literature - Social and political themes
