= Khalil Farah =

Sudanese singer, composer and poet (1894–1932)

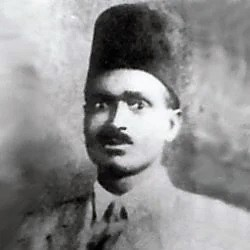

Background information
- Born: 1894; Dabrousa, Saï Island, Sudan
- Died: 13 June 1932 (aged 38) Khartoum, Sudan
- Genres: Music of Sudan, Sudanese literature
- Occupations: Poet, singer, composer
- Years active: 1920s

Khalil Farah (1894 – 13 June 1932) was a Sudanese singer, composer and poet, who wrote his lyrics both in Sudanese colloquial as well as in Modern Standard Arabic. He is considered as one of the most prominent pioneers of the early 20th century renewal in singing and poetry in Sudan.

Following rising nationalist movements in the 1920s, Farah's patriotic poetry expressed his support for independence and the fight against Anglo-Egyptian rule in Sudan. His songs have become symbols of national pride, freedom and political independence. His song Aazza fī Hawāk (My beloved Azza), expressing love for his country in poetic terms, has been called Sudan's most popular patriotic song.

== Background ==
From the beginning of modern written literature during the early decades of the 20th century, and going back to old oral traditions, poetry and songs have been the most popular literary genres in Sudan. Songs celebrating the beauty of the land, its regions and scenery have been popular in Sudanese music since at least the 1930s. Before independence in 1956, poems and songs were often artistically coded expressions of nationalism and opposition to colonial rule. Khalil Farah expressed his patriotic sentiments in romantic verses, such as his Azza fī Hawāk (My beloved Aazza), where Sudan is likened to a beloved woman.

In her overview of "The Contours of Sudanese Literature", literary scholar Constance E. Berkley quoted a study on early Sudanese nationalism: "Since most of the hostile references to Britain and the loving allusions to Egypt were allegorically expressed [...], Farah, it was felt, was personally safe vis-a-vis the Intelligence Department. For the same reason, and because it was not easy to trace the origins of popular songs composed in basically colloquial form of Arabic, the authors remained practically anonymous and equally safe."

== Biography ==
Khalil Farah was born and grew up in the Nubian village of Dabrousa on Saï island in northern Sudan, in the region of Wadi Halfa, in 1894. His father was Sheikh Farah Badri, and his mother was Zahra Sheikh Mohammed. He began his education in the koranic school, called khalwa in Sudan, of Sheikh Ahmed Hashem on the island of Sai, and received his first formal education at the government school in Dongola. Later, his family moved to Omdurman to live with his father's relatives. His father worked in trade and moved frequently between Wadi Halfa and Dongola, often accompanied by his son Khalil. The father died in 1915, and his mother in 1927. In 1923, Farah married Salama Agha Ibrahim, the widow of his brother Badri, on Saï island. They had two children, Farah and Aisha.

Farah attended the technical workshop for mechanical training at the Gordon Memorial College (later the University of Khartoum). During this time, he became a follower of the Sudanese national movement, expressed for example by the White Flag League, and became interested in literary works of Egyptian writers such as Taha Hussein, Mahmoud Abbas Al-Akkad and Ahmed Hassan Al-Zayat, and started to write his own Arabic poetry. He joined literary forums and the Sudanese Writers Union. As his songs became famous, they spread nationalistic ideas of the newly educated Sudanese classes to the largely illiterate population.

Having suffered from illness since 1929, Farah had to undergo medical treatment until his early death on 30 June 1932 at the Nahr Hospital in Khartoum. He was buried there in the Ahmed Sharafi cemetery.

== Legacy ==
As a pioneer of modern Sudanese songs, Farah was a prominent singer of the hageeba style. This new urban style of singing and lyrics was evolving from the 1920s onward, moving away from tribal folk songs and the melodies of religious, devotional singing. Hageeba started as essentially vocal music, sung by a lead singer and a chorus, with percussion coming from the tambourine-like tar frame drum. The lyrics talked about the country, such as the scenery of river Nile, and about love, longing and other feelings. Hageeba was performed at weddings and other social occasions and soon became popular. During the 1930s, the first commercial 78 rpm gramophone records of Sudanese musicians, such as Muhamad Ahmed Sarour and Khalil Farah, were recorded in Cairo and marketed from Omdurman, from where this new music spread to listeners in greater Khartoum and other urban centres.

As historical cultural expressions of protest against political domination and suppression of the right to protest, Farah's songs have been kept alive by other Sudanese musicians, such as Mustafa Sid Ahmed and Igd al-Jalad, and are still sung during the demonstrations against military rule of the 2018/19 Sudanese revolution. Songs like Azza fī Hawāk and Farah's patriotic stance have been called "metaphors of struggles against oppressive regimes and of the capacity of Sudanese to unite against injustices, as well as of certain positive values that are imagined as being “traditional” qualities of the “Sudanese people”. A selection of his poetry was published by Sudanese poet Ali el-Mak in 1977 and also in 1999 by Dār al-Balad publishers in Khartoum. Farah is also the first poet presented in the 2019 anthology Modern Sudanese Poetry.

== See also ==
- Traditional and modern forms of Sudanese literature
- Music of Sudan – 1930s–1950s

== Literature ==
- Berkley, Constance E. (1981). "The Contours of Sudanese Literature". Africa Today. 28 (2): 109–118. ISSN 0001-9887. JSTOR 4186005., reprinted in: Berkley, Constance E. (2007). "The Contours of Sudanese Literature". In Hopkins, Peter G. (ed.). The Kenana Handbook of Sudan. London: Kegan Paul. pp. 517–526. ISBN 9780710311603.
- El-Nour, Eiman (1997). "The Development of Contemporary Literature in Sudan". Research in African Literatures. 28 (3): 150–162. ISSN 0034-5210. JSTOR 3821000.
- Sikainga, Ahmad (2012), "A short history of Sudanese popular music", in Ryle, John; Willis, Justin; Baldo, Suliman; Madut Jok, Jok (eds.), The Sudan Handbook (digital ed.), London: Rift Valley Institute, pp. 243–253, ISBN 9781847010308
