= Buthaina Khidir Mekki =

Sudanese literary writer

Buthaina Khidir Mekki (Arabic: بثينة خضر مكي; born in Shendi, Sudan) is a Sudanese novelist and short story writer. She is a founding member of the Sudanese Writers Union as well as the first president of the Sudanese Women Writers Association. Author of nine books of Arabic novels and collections of short stories, she was called an "icon of the Sudanese feminist novel" for her narratives about negative social stereotypes towards the education of young girls and the consequences of conflict and war for women.

== Life and career ==
Mekki graduated with a Bachelor of Literature in English Language from King Abdelaziz University in Jeddah, Saudi Arabia, in 1978. Further, she obtained a Diploma for Teaching English as a Foreign Language from the Faculty of Arts at University of Khartoum in 1988 and a Higher Diploma in Folklore from the same university in 1992. From 1978 to 1990, she worked as a secondary school English teacher in Khartoum.

Mekki has published five novels and several collections of short stories in her native Arabic, some of which have been translated into English, French, and German. Mekki was honored with the Arab Women Writers award and served as the first president of the Sudanese Women Writers Association. From 2008 to 2009, she was a member of Sudan's National Assembly and served in the Committee for Culture, Youth and Sports. Further, she is a member of the Arab Writers Union and the director of the Buthina Khidir Mekki Center for Culture and Enlightenment in Khartoum.

According to Asma Mohamed Abdel Halim, a human rights activist and associate professor at the Department of Women's and Gender Studies of the University of Toledo in the U.S., Mekki is a prominent writer of the generation following the first Sudanese woman novelist, Malkat al-Dar Muhammad. Abdel Hamid called Mekki an "icon of the Sudanese feminist novel, and intellectuals see her as prolific, unique in style, combining political, social, and psychological literature." Further, she pointed out negative social attitudes towards young girls in Mekki's narratives, highlighting social rejection and gender inequality.

In her 2010 PhD thesis Sudanese literature in English translation, literary scholar Thurraya Soghayroon remarked "typical Sudanese female colloquial expressions" in Mekki's poetic language and the effects of social change and conflict on women in Mekki's short stories. One of Mekki's collections of short stories is titled The Smell of Autumn and other Short Stories. These stories present literary accounts of conflict and fighting in Iraq, Lebanon, Palestine, Egypt, Algeria, Somalia, and Sudan. The collection was translated from Arabic to English by Asma Mohamed Abdel Halim and was published by Africa World Press in 2019. In one of the stories, a female character deplores her country being torn apart by war:

Like her ragged dress, her united country is torn into pieces, like a nation disassembled into heaps and becomes bundles. Whenever it is united in a bond of peace it breaks up again. A war faction from the South. A war faction from the West. A war faction from the East, and one more faction coming from the dam in the North, How I miss sleep, it is gone forever, ah! Dear me! Ay! a..y! Even dreaming became difficult. Dreaming of peace, dreaming of security has become difficult. Woe unto me! Oh! to a country torn by wars, terrors and plights.

— Buthaina Khidir Mekki, The Smell of Autumn

== Works ==
=== In English translation ===
- The Smell of Autumn and other Short Stories, translated by Asma M. Abdel Halim, Africa World Press, Trenton, New Jersey, 2019, ISBN 9781569027233

=== In Arabic ===
==== Short stories ====
- The Palm and the Singing, 1993
- The Village Girl, children's book, 1993
- Ghosts of Cities, 1994
- Spectres of Sadness, 1996
- Autumn Scent, 2006
- Awakening of a Heart, 2019

==== Novels ====
- The Song of Fire, 1998
- Neighing of the River, 2000
- Stones of Thorns, 2005
- Gates of Departure, 2018
- Possibility siege, 2019

== Awards ==
- Golden Medal of Science, Literature and Arts, Sudan, 2003
- Martyr Al-Zubair Award for Creativity and Scientific Excellence

== See also ==
- Modern Sudanese literature
