= Sabah Sanhouri =

Sudanese fiction writer

- صباح سنهوري
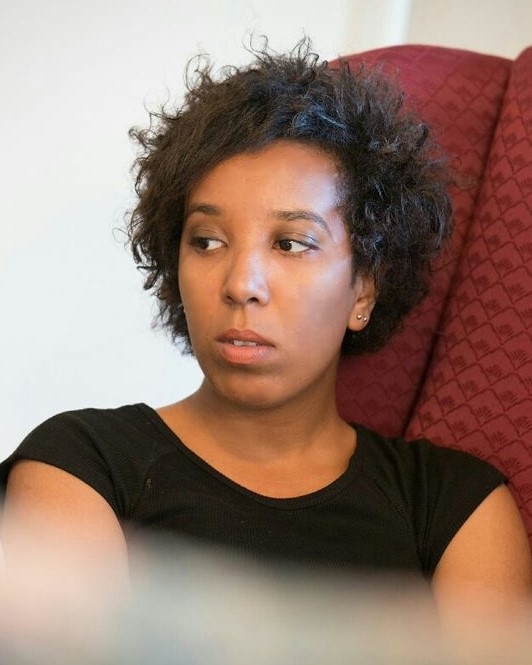
- Sabah Sanhouri in 2014
- Born: Sabah Babiker Ibraheem Sanhouri; 18 December 1990 (age 35); Khartoum, Sudan
- Occupations: fiction writer, cultural essayist and mentor
- Writing career
- Language: Arabic
- Years active: 2009–present
- Notable works: Isolation 2009 short story, Paradise. 2019 novel.
- Notable awards: 2009 Tayeb Salih Creative Writing Award for young writers
- Website: www.sabahsanhouri.com

Sabah Sanhouri (Arabic: صباح سنهوري, born 18 December 1990 in Khartoum, Sudan), also known as Sabah Babiker Ibraheem Sanhouri, is a Sudanese fiction writer, known for her short stories, poetry and the novel Paradise. She writes in Arabic, and several of her stories have been translated into French, English and German.

== Life and work ==
Sabah Babiker Ibraheem Sanhouri was born on 18 December 1990, in Khartoum, Sudan.

=== Literary work ===
In 2009, her story Isolation won the Tayeb Salih Creative Writing Award for young writers and was published both in Arabic, as well as in a French and English translation. In his article on the topic of estrangement in modern Sudanese literature, translator and editor of The Book of Khartoum, Max Shmookler characterizes the story's "descriptions of the lone narrator and the desolate, dystopian town in which he finds himself" as "written in a tight, clipped prose, stripped of the poetic devices of meter, assonance, alliteration, and lexical coupling that give Arabic its particular aural appeal."

A film adaptation of her prize-winning short story Isolation was produced in Jordan by the film director Burhan Saadah in 2013. In 2015, Mirrors, her first collection of short stories, was published in Egypt, and in 2019, she published her first novel, entitled Paradise, in Khartoum. In a review in Arabic, the cultural Internet magazine Geel gadeed characterized this novel like this: "Reading Sabah Sanhouri’s works; for me, is a risky journey, like entering an abandoned children's park in a city where a nuclear reactor has exploded. You might get cancer from radiation-contaminated minerals, and a hungry snake might pounce on your leg. And the journey of reading becomes even more dangerous, since the author belongs to your generation."

In 2022, her novel Paradise was published in German in an edition curated by Rafik Schami, one of Germany's most widely read writers. Centered around the fictitious suicide agency ›Paradise‹, an author called Salam tries to do justice to her job by writing suicide scenarios tailored to the agency's customers. The story's almost endless string of suicides has been interpreted as the search for the meaning of life, and fellow Sudanese writer Abdelaziz Baraka Sakin wrote about it: “I couldn't tear myself away from the strange world of Paradise, with its characters standing on the brink of death as they slide of their own free will into a dark abyss, into a hell that their minds imagine to be heaven, sold to them by an agency as an illusion of eternal salvation."

Sanhouri writes in Arabic, and several of her stories have been translated into French, English, German, and Italian. She is also a freelance journalist and a member of the Geneva Writers Group.

=== Other work ===
Apart from her work as writer of essays, poetry and fiction, Sanhouri has been active as a mentor for young Sudanese writers, by conducting several workshops called #OneDayFiction in various cities of Sudan. The participants' age ranged from 18 to 28 years, and included young people with disabilities and youth in prisons. Among others, these workshops were sponsored by the cultural section of the Embassy of Italy in Sudan as well as by the German cultural centre Goethe-Institut in Khartoum. In 2014, she was invited to the University of Iowa's International Writing Program. She is a member of the Sudanese Writers Union, a jury member of the University of Khartoum Short Story Contest, and gave a TEDx Talk about her approach to writing in 2018.

In September 2016, she participated in the International Festival of Literature in Berlin and in 2020 in the Festival of African Literature Crossing Borders in Cologne, Germany. For September 11, 2022, the International Literature Festival Berlin announced her participation again, this time together with the writer Stella Gaitano from South Sudan.

== Selected works ==
- Isolation (2009). Short story in Arabic and English, published on online magazine Words without Borders and in the French anthology Nouvelles du Soudan
- Mirrors. Collection of short stories (2015). Merit Publishing House, Cairo, Egypt
- Paradise. Novel (2019). Almosawarat Publishing, Khartoum
  German edition: Paradise. Schiler & Mücke Publishers, Berlin. ISBN 9783899304404

== See also ==
- Sudanese literature
- List of Sudanese writers
