= Ali El-Makk =

Sudanese writer, translator and literary scholar

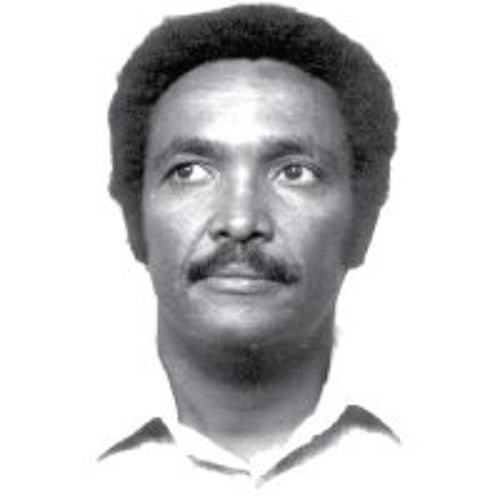
- Born: 13 February 1937 Omdurman, Sudan
- Died: October 1992 (aged 55) United States
- Occupation: literary writer, academic and translator
- Years active: late 1950s–1992

Ali El-Makk (Arabic: علي المك; 13 February 1937 – October 1992), full name Ali Muhammad Ali El-Mak, also spelled Ali El-Maak or Ali Makk, was a Sudanese writer, translator and literary scholar, known for his short stories, translations from English into Arabic and literary studies.

== Early life ==
Ali was born in Omdurman, Sudan. When he was less than six years old, he started his primary education in Kottab Wad El-mostaffa, but because his father moved about as a judge, he moved to Argo in the Northern State, then moved again to El-Fasher in Darfur state (now called North Darfur). When he finished third class, the school administration advised that he join the El-woostta, or intermediate school, because of his high marks (at that time in Sudan, primary school lasted for four years), but Ali's mother refused, preferring that he finish the fourth class. Ali finished the fourth class in the El-Salemeaa primary school when his father transferred again to Meroë (Merowe) in the Northern State, a place which he later wrote much about.

His interest in writing started in Al-Amiriyah intermediate school in Wad Medani in 1947. He was also inspired by his father's library, which contained many books of Sharia Law and its interpretation. Ali made his first attempt at writing in Meroë during the summer holiday, where he edited a fortnightly magazine, writing under the pen name Gesimtty Keeda (This Kismet). His interest in music began even earlier when listening to Mohamed Ahmed Sarror, Karoma, and Abdallah El-Mahhi. He joined the Wadi Sidenna secondary school in 1951.

== Career and literary works ==
El-Makk joined Khartoum University in 1955, graduating from the Faculty of Art with a Bachelor of Arts with honours degree in 1961. He then moved to the United States, earning a master's degree in public administration in 1966 from the University of Southern California. El-Makk returned to Sudan and worked in the Human Resource Department in the Ministry of the Treasury (1961–1970) (He had been working there since graduating in 1961, and then went to the US for his studies until his return in 1966), and also worked as a chief officer in the State Institution for Cinema (1970–1971), then he worked as a lecturer in Intuition of Public Administration in Khartoum (1972–1973), and then chief and chief-editor in Housing Publishing in Khartoum University (1973–1983). Ali worked as an expert and as a professor at the Translation and Arabization Unit in Khartoum University (1983–1992). El-Makk was awarded a scholarship from American Fulbright Institution in 1988, and conducted research at the University of New Mexico, focussing on the translations of native American myths into Arabic.

El-Makk worked as a supervisor with more than 20 postgraduate students in translation (Master and Ph.D.). He contributed in many congresses, seminars, and festivals around the world, including The International Congress of Poetry in Astroja in former Yugoslavia in 1971, The Seventh International Festival of Cinema in Moscow in 1971, The festival of Saudi Arabian Writers in Riyadh in 1983, and The Seminar of International Book in Cambridge University in 1990. He also contributed to many unions and councils as an example the member of the National Council of Art Auspice in 1974 and as same time the chairman of short stories and cinema and novel Committee, The chairman of Sudanese Music (one of the UNESCO branches) (1974–1985), the member of Council of lecturers of University of Khartoum (the highest academic institution in the university) (1983–1992), member of council Arab League Institution for translation in Algeria, the chief editor of Magallat Ala-Addab magazine, and the chairman of Sudanese Writers Union from 1986 until his death. Finally, he was a member of the Council of Art Faculty, and member of the Research Council of Art Faculty, and a member of Central Researches of the University of Khartoum.

El-Makk also edited collections of Arabic poetry by Sudanese poets Khalil Farah and Abdallah Al-Banna.

== Selected works ==
=== Poetry in Arabic ===
- A City of Dust (1974), translated from the original Medīna min al-turāb, by El-Fatih Mahjoub and Constance E. Berkley

=== Short stories ===
- The Case (2005), included in Modern Arabic Fiction: An Anthology, edited by Salma Khadra Jayyusi
- Forty-One Minarets, translated by Adil Babikir, on ArabLit.

=== Short stories by other authors, translated from English to Arabic ===
- The Petit Bourgeois, translated as Al borogoizia alsageera, Arabic title البرجوازية الصغيرة in collaboration with Salah Ahmed Ibrahim (1958)
- In The Village, translated as Fee Algareeia, Arabic title فى القرية
- The Moon Sitting on the Yard of Its Home, translated as Al-Gammar Galis Fee Fanna Darihi, Arabic title القمر جالس فى فناء داره (1973)
- The Climb to the Bottom of the Town, translated as Al-soad alla asffel almedina, Arabic title الصعود الى أسفل المدينة
- The Fever of El-Dreiss, translated as Homma El-dreissa, Arabic title حمى الدريس

=== Translations from English to Arabic ===
- Sample from Black American Literature (1971)
- Guilty Land by Patrick van Rensburg, translated in 1972 in collaboration with Salah Ahmed Ibrahim
- Selections from Indian-American Art and their stories, published in various Sudanese newspapers
- Translation of a short story by F. Scott Fitzgerald, published in El-Faysal magazine (No. 94, January 1985)
- "A Questionnaire for Rudolph Gordon" by Jack Matthews
- "The Cliff" by Charles Baxter from his book Harmony of the World
- *Old Stories from China*
- *Zeineb The Red Sugar* by Sudanese writer Jamal Mohammed Ahmed
- Five poems by García Lorca

== See also ==
- Sudanese literature
- List of Sudanese writers
