= Sudanese literature =

Sudanese literature consists of both oral as well as written works of fiction and nonfiction that were created during the cultural history of today's Republic of the Sudan. This includes the territory of what was once Anglo-Egyptian Sudan, the independent country's history since 1956 as well as its changing geographical scope in the 21st century.

Even though there exist records about historical societies in the area called Sudan, like the Kingdom of Kush in Nubia, little is known about the languages and the oral or written literature of these precursors of the Sudan of today. Moreover, the notion of Bilad al-Sudan, from which the name of the modern country is derived, referred to a much wider geographic region to the south of the Sahara, stretching from western to eastern Central Africa.

Like in many African countries, oral traditions of diverse ethnic or social groups have existed since time immemorial, but a modern written Sudanese literature can only be traced back to the beginning of the 20th century. Through the publication of written literature in Sudanese newspapers and books, as well as aided by formal, non-religious education, a modern Sudanese literature of fiction and nonfiction began to appear. Going back to age-old oral traditions, poetry and the lyrics for songs have been the most popular literary genres in Sudan. Just as other cultural expressions, literature reflects the hybrid identities of Sudan, that have been called Afro-Arabism by some scholars. In the 21st century, electronic media, which often rely on written texts and oral storytelling on video, connect people in Sudan with their compatriots at home as well as in the world-wide Sudanese diaspora. Some contemporary writers with Sudanese roots and living in other countries, such as Leila Aboulela or Jamal Mahjoub, write in English. Together with translations of original works written in Arabic, they have made fictional literature about Sudan accessible to an international audience.

== History ==
=== Historical precursors of modern literature in Sudan ===
The oldest existing records of the precursors of a distinctive Sudanese literature can be dated to about 300 BCE and were written in the Meroitic script. These historical records, such as inscriptions on sandstone, bear testimony of the kings of Kush or deities of the Kushite culture in northern Sudan. During the Christianization of Nubia in the sixth century CE, the Kushite language and cursive script were replaced by Byzantine Greek, Coptic, and Old Nubian languages, with texts relating both to religion, to public affairs or to private life. From the fourteenth century onwards, Arabic gradually became the primary language in Nubia and, with the spread of Islam, developed into the main written and spoken language for religious and secular affairs in most other parts of Sudan.

The oral poetic tradition of the northern Nilotic Sudan was mainly expressed in colloquial Sudanese Arabic. Presented orally or in songs, poetry was and still is a fundamental form of literary expression in highly developed and structured forms. Most of the poetry that has survived from the 19th century is in praise of the Islamic prophet Muhammad and during the Mahdist period, in praise of the Mahdi.

A rare historical record written in the early 19th century by Shaykh Ahmad ibn al-Hajj Abi Ali (b. 1784–5) and other early Sudanese historians is the Funj Chronicle. Preserved in several versions in many manuscripts, it present a history of the Funj sultanate (1504–1821) and its capital at Sennar, on the Blue Nile, and of the Turco-Egyptian regime that succeeded it. The manuscripts were edited as an annotated translation under the title "The Sudan of the Three Niles" in 1999 by British historian Peter M. Holt. In her review of this edition, historian Heather J. Sharkey wrote: "Along with the Tabaqat of Ibn Dayf Allah (a biographical dictionary of Sudanese Muslim holy men compiled in the late eighteenth century), the Funj Chronicle is the most important Arabic source for the northern riverain Sudan in the Funj era, a period when Islam was spreading widely." Another account of the early 19th century was written by Muḥammad al-Tūnisī (d. 1857), who spent ten years as merchant from Cairo in the Sultanate of Darfur and described the kingdom in detail and with his own drawings in the book entitled 'In Darfur'.

=== Traditional and modern forms of oral literature ===
Literature in contemporary Sudan is either recited orally or written in the Arabic language, with certain types also in local languages, such as poetry in the Fur language of western Sudan. As in other African countries, both written literature and genres of oral tradition, such as folk tales, proverbs or poems, are common, but depend on their social setting, such as in rural, partly illiterate or in urban educated societies. These oral types of storytelling may be simply recited by individuals or by groups of persons, or they may be accompanied by singing and musical accompaniments, thus transgressing the theoretical definition of literature and music.

"Long before the novel and short story became known as literary genres, Sudanese literature existed in the form of oral stories and narrative poems, most of which, until recently, were transmitted from one generation to the next.", as literary critic Eiman El-Nour put it in her seminal paper The Development of Contemporary Literature in Sudan.

Among the living oral traditions, there are the Ahaji folk tales and the Madih, or religious praise tales. The first kind generally have a mythological and often local character. According to El-Nour, "they invariably have happy endings and are full of fanciful scenes and superstitions that describe the magic powers of genies and ogres." Madih, the other kind of poetry is typically recited by a singer and chorus, and has a religious character, praising Muhammad or revered religious leaders. Sudanese folk tales have been collected and edited by Abdallah al-Tayyib, a scholar of Arabic literature and language, and published in English as Heroes of Arabia as well as in Stories from the sands of Africa.

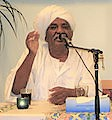
Sudanese poet Mahjoub Sharif

Poetry and songs continue to occupy a prominent role in contemporary Sudanese culture. Songs celebrating the beauty of the land, its regions and scenery have been very popular in modern music since at least the 1930s. Before independence, poems and the lyrics of songs were often artistic expressions of nationalism and other political issues. Among others, Khalil Farah (1892–1932) was an important poet, and his patriotic verses have been used in popular songs like "Azza fī Hawāk" (My beloved Azza).

During more recent times of political oppression, forms of oral literature have been expressions of resistance towards the rulers of the day, and have even led to the imprisonment or exile of poets like Mahjoub Sharif (1948–2014) or musicians like Mohammed Wardi (1932–2012).

A traditional form of oral poetry are the songs of praise or ridicule by female singers of Western Sudan, called Hakamat. These are women of high social standing, respected for their eloquence, intuition and decisiveness, who may both incite or vilify the men of their tribe, when engaged in feuds with other tribes. The social impact of these Hakamat can be exceptionally strong. Because of this, they have recently been invited by peacebuilding initiatives in Darfur in order to exert their influence for conflict resolution or other social issues, like environmental protection. Other forms of popular oral literature are Sudanese folk tales, often narrated by female storytellers.

In the 21st century, contemporary forms of oral literature in urban settings as an expression of identity, political resistance or visions of the future include the forms of spoken word poetry, political slogans, rap, or hip hop music that preceded and accompanied the Sudanese Revolution of 2018/19.

== The beginnings of modern Sudanese literature ==
=== Background ===
In the Sudan, as in other Third World countries, an inherent respect for the spoken word has created an awareness of the intimate links between language, literature and social reality. (...) This awareness of the intimate links between language and society causes the Sudanese writers' conception of literature to be more holistic than the view of his Western counterpart. It is believed that "Art" has always been in the service of man.

— Constance E. Berkley (1981), "The Contours of Sudanese Literature", p. 109.

Moreover, literary scholar Constance E. Berkley states that "Sudanese Arabic literature has links with all Arabic literature, both past and present. At the same time, it is valid in its own right. Among the Sudanese, as among other African and/or Arabic speaking people, poetry is the preferred literary form." On the further issue of writing in Arabic with a distinct Sudanese character, the Sudanese poet and critic Mohammed Abdul-Hayy writes: "Muhammad Ahmed Mahgoub was one of the leading literary spokesmen who (...) expressed the idea of a Sudanese literature 'written in Arabic, but infused with the idiom of our land, because this (idiom) is what distinguishes a literature of one nation from another.'"

Although there were several newspapers published in Sudan around the beginning of the 20th century, like Jaridat al-Sudan, a biweekly paper published in Arabic and English first printed in 1903, arguably the most important newspaper in terms of impact on modern Sudanese literature was Al-Ra'id (The Pioneer). This newspaper, published in Arabic, started in Khartoum, the Sudanese capital, in 1914 and presented a variety of poetry and other literary forms. Its first editor was the well-known poet and journalist Abdul Raheem Glailati. In 1917, the British authorities deported him to Cairo because of his article criticising the poor living conditions of Sudanese. Despite this, he later could publish a collection of revolutionary, nationalist poetry in 1924. In 1934, the literary journal Al Fajr (The Dawn) was founded and became known for publishing the first Sudanese short stories.

Another important factor for the development of written literature in Sudan was the spread of modern educational institutions, like the Gordon Memorial College in Khartoum and other non-religious schools in major cities like Omdurman or Wad Madani. Before this development, the only books available for education were those written in Arabic. Schooling in the English language also provided Sudanese intellectuals with access to English literature, translations from other Western languages and to non-fictional publications on world-wide issues.

=== Important literary genres ===
Apart from poetry, the most prominent literary genre in Sudan is the short story. This form of writing started in the 1920s and was largely influenced by Arabic short stories in Egyptian newspapers. Tājouj (1948), a romantic love story by Osman Muhammad Hashim (1897–1981), has been called the first Sudanese novel. Since the period preceding the independence of Sudan in 1956, short stories and novels have dealt with political and social issues, as well as with the question of the country's complex cultural identity. This central theme of what it means to be Sudanese is marked in more or lesser degrees by both African roots as well as by Arabic cultural influences. This multiple cultural identity also gave the name to a group of writers of the 1960s, comprising Al-Nur Osman Abkar, Mohammed Abdul-Hayy, Ali El-Makk, Mohammed El-Makki Ibrahim and Salah Ahmed Ibrahim, called The Jungle and Desert School (madrasat al-ghāba wa-l-ṣaḥrā’), where "jungle" stands for the rainforests of the South and "desert" refers to northern Sudan. Sudan's hybrid identity has been reflected in numerous literary works since then. Some authors such as Ḥāmid Badawī (b. 1956), have chosen literary characters and places from various regions, others wrote about families with members from different ethnic backgrounds or about people displaced from rural origins to the larger cities.

=== Sudan's hybrid cultural identity ===
This central theme of what it means to be Sudanese is marked to greater or lesser degree by both African roots as well as by Arabic cultural influences. Since The Jungle and Desert School, numerous other writers have included this hybrid identity in their narratives, either by choosing literary characters or places from different regions, as does Abkar Adam Isma‘il (b. 1965), who originates from Kordofan, in his novel Aḥlām fī bilād al-shams (Dreams in the Land of the Sun). Authors such as Hamid Badawi (b. 1956) included references to intermarriage between Arabs and Africans in his Mashrū‘ Ibrāhīm al-Asmar al-riwā’ī (Ibrahim al-Asmar's Project of Novel).

Numerous novelists, among them Ibrahim Ishaq, Jamal Mohammad Ibrahim, Al-Hasan Bakri (b. 1955) and others, have focused on the coexistence of many diverse ethnic, cultural, religious, and linguistic groups living next to each one another in Sudan. Another example is the Sudanese journalist and renowned poet across the Arabic literary world Muhammad al-Fayturi (1936–2015), whose extensive poetic work "particularly draws upon his experience as an African living among Arabs, and thus addresses issues such as race, class and colonialism." Resuming these recurrent literary topics, critic and translator of Sudanese novels Xavier Luffin made the following remark: "At the same time, none of these authors idealizes this richness, since they often quote the many problems faced by the marginalized, such as racism and civil war."

=== Social and political themes ===
In line with social and political developments in other countries at the time, stories, novels and poems dealing with social realist themes, like the conflicts between social classes were also written in Sudan. These were spurred on by Sudanese academics, who were returning home after studying in Egypt or European countries.

After the 1990s, an increasing number of writers included social and political issues by choosing poor and marginalized people as major characters. Thus, Ibrahim Bashir Ibrahim (b. 1958) described people's lives in a suburban slum of Al-Obeid in his novel Al-Zindiyya (1995). Further novels dealing with people living in slums or with the shammasa (street boys) are Dhākirat shirrīr (2005, Memories of a Bad Boy) by Mansour El Souwaim and The Kandarees (2012) by Abdalaziz Baraka Sakin. In a general sense, "marginal characters became a real topos in Sudanese literature, because of their profession, often related to an ethnic origin: the Southern alcohol-seller, the Ethiopian prostitute, the West African healer, and so on. Depicted with empathy, they often play the role of rebels against the political and moral authorities."

A number of authors writing stories with social and political contexts also have included explicit references to Sudan's failures of democracy. Thus, Ahmad al-Malik (b. 1967) presented a typical despot in his Al-Kharīf ya’tī ma‘a Ṣafā’ (2003) (Autumn Comes with Safā), which tells the story of a president through his own memories, "from his coming to power by chance to the eve of his disappearance." Al-Malik further included numerous details of life under dictatorship, "mixing them with fantasy, dream, and humor in a style that recalls magical realism", which helps the author to avoid censorship.

Another novel dealing with dictatorship is Waṭan khalf al-quḍbān (2002) (A Nation behind Bars) by Khālid ‘Uways (b. 1972). Here, the writer does not dwell explicitly on the dictator, but most of all on the system and its victims: His main characters are two women in jail, Rābi‘a and Mary, an educated artist from the North and a servant from the South of the country. By narrating their lives in jail and in the outside world, the novel describes a host of negative influences employed by the regime against its own people. By the characters of Rābi‘a and Mary, ‘Uways shows "that the victims of the regime are both Africans and Arabs, non-Muslims and Muslims."

Similar recurrent themes are the "undeniable and long history of conflict and political turbulence", caused by authoritarian governments, for example in the political poems of Mahjoub Sharif, violent clashes between militias and impoverished human beings in Abdelaziz Baraka Sakin's novels or discrimination and violence against women, told by female authors like Rania Mamoun or Stella Gaitano. Among contemporary Sudanese poets, Mahjoub Sharif is remembered for his poems "for freedom, full with music, witty, agitating, but always didactic." As critic Magdi El Gizouli wrote in his obituary about Sharif: "A school teacher by training, this secular prophet spoke truth to power in a creative language that readily transformed into powerful memes, and as a consequence landed him habitually in the detention cells of Sudan's military rulers."

Political discrimination has also affected the Sudanese Writers Union, which was founded in 1985 in order to promote freedom of expression and to bring together writers of different cultural groups. It was dissolved by the military government of Omar al-Bashir in 1989 and could only be revived from 2006 onwards. After ten years of activities in the general context of suppression of free expression, it was closed down again in 2015, but upon a court ruling in 2016, the Union managed to resume its activities. - In 2015, poet Mamoun Eltlib and others started a monthly street market for used books called Mafroosh, meaning “spread out” or “display”, attracting many young people looking for books. But a short time later, these informal meetings were also banned by the government. Publishing and distributing books also suffered greatly from the government's neglect and censorship, which also led to the circulation of illegal copies.

According to the editor and translator of The Book of Khartoum, Max Shmookler, Sudanese literature of the late 20th century is characterized by an "association between estrangement (ghurba) and the West (al-gharb)" that "has run deep in Sudanese society and literature." This cultural contrast between a largely conservative society, even in the urban centres, and the growing influence of a globalized world, is reflected in the choice of characters and plots of many contemporary authors. Examples for this contrast and estrangement can be found in Tayeb Salih's Season of Migration to the North, but also in stories about human tragedy, like the pandemic in Amir Taj al-Sir's novel Ebola 76 or in the short story Isolation by one of the youngest authors, Sabah Sanhouri.

Here we find the tension between Sudanese society as it is and how it might have been and could, perhaps, still become. This is the tension between the present state of conflict — over resources, political power, and identity — and the nostalgia for a more harmonious past, or perhaps the aspiration for a different type of future.

— Max Shmookler, Biting their Mother-Tongue: Three Sudanese Short-Stories about Estrangement

s emerging male and female writers:

The first novel depicting the life of a working woman in Sudan was "Al-Faragh al-'arid" (The Wide Void). Written by the short story writer and novelist Malkat al-Dar Mohamed (1920–1969) in the early 1950s, it was only published after her death in 1969. Another woman with a feminist perspective was Buthaina Khidir Mekki, who wrote novels and short stories dealing with negative stereotypes towards the education of young girls and the consequences of conflict and war for women.

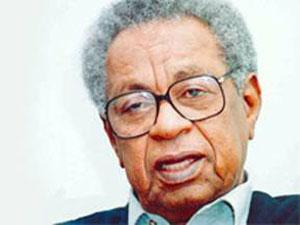
Sudanese writer Tayeb Salih

Arguably the most notable Sudanese writer of the 20th century is Tayeb Salih (1929–2009), who wrote both novels and short stories. His most well-known work, translated as Season of Migration to the North and published in 1966, deals with the coming of age of a student returning to Sudan from England and his recollection of this liberating period in his life. The novel was banned in the author's native Sudan for some time because of its sexual imagery, but later it became readily available. Further, this novel was famous among Arabic readers across the region, was included in Banipal magazine's list of the 100 Best Arabic Novels, and has been translated into more than twenty languages.

Ibrahim Ishaq (1946–2021) was a Sudanese novelist and short story writer, whose narrative works are mostly set in his native Darfur region of western Sudan. From 1969 on, he published six novels and three collections of short stories, as well as academic studies about the history and literature of Africa. Through his subject-matter and elements of the local forms of language, he introduced the life and culture of Darfur to readers in other parts of the country.

Fatima al-Sanoussi (born in the 1950s) worked both as journalist, writer and translator. She is known for her flash fiction that had a strong influence on writers of the 1980s and young readers. Her stories have been described as moving "across categories and outside the existing structures and genre constraints".

Bushra Elfadil, a former lecturer of Russian literature at the University of Khartoum and now living in exile in Saudi Arabia, won the Caine Prize in 2017 with "The Story of the Girl Whose Birds Flew Away", first published in The Book of Khartoum.

Among other topics, Jamal Mohammad Ibrahim (b. 1959) treated the complex Sudanese identity of African and Arab heritage: In his Nuqṭat talāshī (A Point of Disappearance, 2008) by describing one of his characters as “a perfect and typical Sudanese, who has taken something from each background: he has taken his pleasant brown color from Africa, and his loquacity from the Arabs.” In Dafātir Kambālā (The Kampala Notebooks, 2009), he explored the African roots of Sudan through a “philosophical journey” in Uganda. Based on this literary approach, he was described as one of the Sudanese writers who included "African names, realistic descriptions of traditions and beliefs, and even words in African languages.

Born in Cairo of Sudanese parents in 1959, Tarek Eltayeb has been living in Vienna, Austria, since 1984. In addition to seven books in Arabic, he has also published his poetry, novels and short stories in German translation. His novel Cities Without Palms tells the story of a young man from Sudan, who first migrated to Egypt and then further on to Europe.

A Sudanese writer of international recognition is Amir Taj al-Sir (born 1960). He has published more than a dozen books, including poetry and nonfiction. His first novel Karmakul came out in 1988, and his novel The Hunter of the Chrysalises was shortlisted for the 2011 International Prize for Arabic Fiction, mentored by the Booker Prize Foundation in London.

Ishraga Mustafa Hamid (born 1961) is a poet, literary translator and human rights activist of Sudanese origin, living in Austria since 1993. Writing both in Arabic and German, her literary works encompass poetry and prose, often reflecting her own or the experiences of other migrants in Austria. Until 2017, she had published seven works in German, and as many in Arabic.

Abdelaziz Baraka Sakin (born 1963) has written several popular novels and collections of short stories, including The Jango, which deals with the conditions in a women's prison and won the Al-Tayeb Salih Award for Creative Writing. His books were initially sold in local bookstores, but later confiscated and banned by the Sudanese authorities and were subsequently only available outside of Sudan. His novel The Messiah of Darfur, which takes place in the context of the civil war in Darfur, was translated into French and German. Since 2012, Baraka Sakin has lived in exile in Austria and has been invited to a number of literary festivals in Africa, France and Germany.

Mansour El Souwaim, (born 1970), has released two novels and two collections of short stories. His second novel, titled Memories of a Bad Boy, received the Tayeb Salih Award for Creative Writing in 2005.

Hamed al-Nazir (born 1975), a Sudanese journalist and novelist living in Qatar, has published three acclaimed novels. Two of them, The Waterman's Prophecy and The Black Peacock were longlisted for the prestigious International Prize for Arabic Fiction.

Najlaa Eltom (born 1975) is a Sudanese writer, poet and translator who became known for her poetry in Sudan and abroad during the early 2000s. In 2012, she went to Sweden for a degree in English literature at Stockholm University and has lived there since.

Hammour Ziada, (born 1979), has published several volumes of fiction in Arabic, and is best known for his second novel Shawq al-darwīsh (The Longing of the Dervish), which won the Naguib Mahfouz Prize in 2014 and was also nominated for the 2015 International Prize for Arabic Fiction. This novel and several of his stories have appeared in English translation, including in the anthology The Book of Khartoum (Comma Press, 2016) as well as in Banipal magazine.

Stella Gaitano, born in Khartoum of parents from southern Sudan in 1979, has published both short stories and a novel in Arabic that have been translated into English. She grew up and studied in Khartoum, and writes stories often dealing with the harsh living conditions of people from southern Sudan, who have endured discrimination and military dictatorship, or war and displacement in the northern part of Sudan.

Rania Mamoun (born 1979) is another contemporary female writer, who has written novels and short stories, translated as Thirteen Months of Sunrise. Several of her stories have appeared in English translation, including in The Book of Khartoum, Banthology and in Banipal literary magazine.

Sabah Sanhouri (born 1990), is a cultural essayist and literary author from Khartoum, who writes prose as well as poetry. Her story "Isolation" won the Al-Tayeb Salih Award for Creative Writing in 2009 and was published both in Arabic, and later in a French and English translation. Mirrors, her first collection of short stories, came out in Egypt and Sudan in 2014, and in 2019, she published her first novel, entitled Paradise.

In 2021, Muhammad Ismail won the first prize of the Katara Award for the Arabic Novel for his short story “The Brothers of Yusuf”, selected from more than 400 entries.

In 2023, Reem Gaafar won the South African Island Prize for a Debut Novel from Africa for the manuscript of her novel A Mouth Full of Salt. She is the first novelist from Sudan to be distinguished by this award.

Ann El Safi is a Sudanese journalist, poet and novelist, living in Abu Dhabi and Canada. Up to 2019, she has published poems and several novels as well as articles on mass media in modern societies.

In December 2020 Sawad Hussain, who has translated numerous novels from Arabic into English, published an article about emerging Sudanese women novelists in Words without Borders magazine. And in May 2022, ArabLit magazine presented several articles by and about Sudanese women writers, as well as other articles on literary works from Sudan in English translation.

== Literature in English by writers with Sudanese roots ==
The earliest records of a writer from Sudan using the English language are the memoir and other literary works of Selim Aga, born around 1826 in Taqali, a historical state in the Nuba Hills, in modern-day central Sudan. As a young boy, he had been sold as slave to various owners and was eventually brought to Scotland in 1836. There, he was raised and educated as a free man by the family of Robert Thurburn, at the time British consul in Alexandria. In 1846, he published his autobiographical Incidents Connected with the Life of Selim Aga, written in "faultless idiomatic English". — The first Sudanese modern novel written in English was Their Finest Days (1969), by Al-Sirr Ḥasan Faḍl, a political novel about the rumor of a coup d’état two months after the October 1964 revolution.

Taban Lo Liyong, who was born in southern Sudan in 1939 and studied in the 1960s in the United States, is one of Africa's well-known poets, writers of fiction and literary criticism. According to the Encyclopædia Britannica, "Liyong wrote highly imaginative short narratives, such as Fixions (1969), and unorthodox free verse,( ...) His nonfiction output consists of argumentative and amusing personal essays and bold literary criticism (...), presenting challenging new ideas in an original manner." After teaching positions in several countries, including Sudan, he became professor of English at the University of Juba.

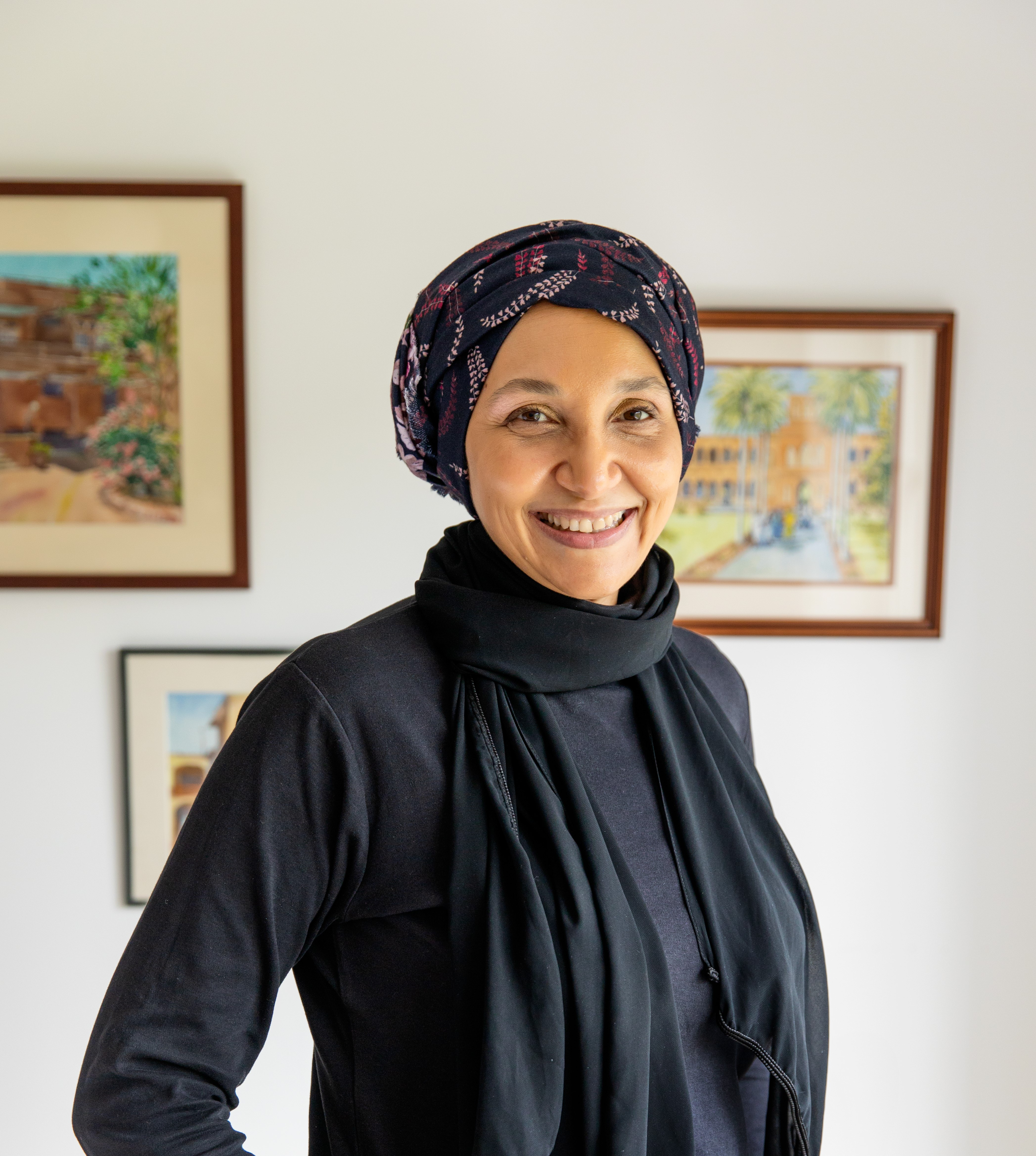
Sudanese writer Leila Aboulela

Leila Aboulela, who was born in 1964 in Cairo, Egypt, to an Egyptian mother and a Sudanese father, and grew up in Khartoum, is a Sudanese writer who lives in Scotland and writes in English. Her poems, short stories and novels have received international acclaim and have been translated into other languages, including Arabic.

Jamal Mahjoub, born in London in 1966 of British and Sudanese parents and grew up in Khartoum, writes in English and has published a trilogy taking place in Sudan. His memoir A Line in the River (2019) recounts the years from the military coup of 1989 up to the separation of South Sudan in 2001. In an article about literature in Sudan, written just about as the Sudanese Revolution of 2018/19 came to its final stage, he gave the following assessment of the limitations for writers, publishers and readers:

The last 30 years have been difficult for Sudanese artists of all kinds – among them musicians and painters, but particularly writers. The 1989 coup triggered an exodus. People left to settle in Cairo and the Gulf, North America and Europe, even Japan and Australia. Inside the country, a new generation of writers has since grown up in the shadow of repression. Despite these difficulties writers have continued to work and publish, both within the country and abroad. In a climate where newspapers are regularly censored, journalists detained and print runs seized, books have remained cherished items to be passed around with reverence.

— Jamal Mahjoub, Top 10 books about Sudan. The Guardian, May 2019

A representative of young writers of Sudanese origin, living in the worldwide Sudanese diaspora, is Safia Elhillo (born 1990), a Sudanese-American poet known for her written and spoken poetry. Her poems have appeared in several publications, including Poetry, Callaloo, the Academy of American Poets’ Poem-a-day series, and in anthologies, such as The BreakBeat Poets: New American Poetry in the Age of Hip-Hop and Women of Resistance: Poems for a New Feminism. Her collection of poetry The January Children (2017) refers to the children born in Sudan under British occupation, whose date of birth was often indiscriminately recorded as 1 January.

Emtithal Mahmoud, who was born in Darfur in 1992, moved with her parents to the United States as a child. She became known as a spoken word poet and activist for refugees. In 2015, she won the Individual World Poetry Slam championship and has since published her first collections of poems in English, entitled Sisters' Entrance.

K. Eltinaé is a Sudanese poet of Nubian descent, based in Spain. His work has appeared in magazines such as World Literature Today and the African American Review, as well as in The Ordinary Chaos of Being Human: Tales from Many Muslim Worlds, among other publications. His debut collection The Moral Judgement of Butterflies won the 2019 International Beverly Prize for Literature. He is the recipient of the Visionary Arts Memorial Reza Abdoh Poetry Prize 2021. He also co-won the 2019 Dignity Not Detention Prize.

Daoud Hari, who was born as a tribesman in the Darfur region of Western Sudan, wrote an autobiographical memoir in English about life and people in Darfur, entitled The Translator: A Tribesman's Memoir of Darfur. Through his story, he tried to bring further international attention to the plight of his people and country.

In 2008, the autobiographical memoir about women's experiences with genocide and war in Darfur, called Tears of the Desert, was published by Halima Bashir. This Sudanese medical doctor chose her fictitious name in order to stay anonymous. The book was co-authored by British journalist Damian Lewis and published after Halima Bashir had found asylum in the U.K.

Yassmin Abdel-Magied (born 1991), a Sudanese-Australian media presenter and writer, first became known for her outspoken engagement in community work and Australian media, including talks and blogs about her multicultural identity as a young Muslim woman in Australia. In 2016, she published her memoir called Yassmin's Story, and in 2019 a novel for young adults, titled You Must Be Layla.

Sudanese-American writer Fatin Abbas based her 2023 debut novel Ghost Season on her personal experience of working for an NGO in the border region between northern and southern Sudan. The story is set in the fictitious village Saaraya, a "flashpoint in the civil war between the Southern rebel movement and the Northern government based in Khartoum."

=== Memoirs by former slaves and 'Lost Boys' ===
Based on their painful experiences of persecution, human trafficking and deplacement, a number of people from southern Sudan have published their memoirs in English. Examples are the autobiographical accounts Escape from Slavery by Francis Bok or Slave by Mende Nazer. Other accounts were published by some of the "Lost Boys of Sudan", a group of over 20.000 boys of the Nuer and Dinka ethnic groups, who were displaced or orphaned during the Second Sudanese Civil War (1987–2005). After emigrating to the U.S. or the U.K., these refugees from Sudan published their stories, usually with co-editors in their country of refuge.

== Works for young readers and graphic storytelling ==
Modern literature for children and young adults has been written, among others, by authors and illustrators such as Abdel-Ghani Karamallah and Salah El-Mur. Also, the poet Mahmoud Sharif published a collection of short stories for children entitled Zeinab and the Mango Tree. Another book for children called Kadisa (Sudanese expression for cat) was written in 2017 by Sudanese-American elementary teacher Rasha Hamid and illustrated by Sharhabil Ahmed, a well-known musician and graphic artist.

In the 1950s and up to the mid-1990s, the Ministry of Education published comics magazines such as Al-Sabyan (Boy's Journal), Maryud and Sabah (Morning) in order to develop children's literacy. But because of diminishing support, the numbers of such magazines and children's books decreased from 30.000 copies a week of the most popular magazine to a much lower number of such publications.

In the 21st century, Sudanese comic strips and graphic storytelling have been enjoying a growing audience. They are mainly published on social media, but also in the form of magazines or during national comic competitions.

As a political cartoonist living in the Sudanese diaspora, Khalid Albaih has become known for his social and political caricatures in Arab and international online media.

== Traditional and modern forms of Sudanese theatre ==
Rituals and theatre-like performances, such as the zār rituals, have been described by modern studies as part of ancient and traditional civilisations in Sudan. During the 1930s, Ibrahim al-Abadi (1894 -1980) created a play about an important Sudanese resistance fighter against the Turkish army, El Mek Nimr, and Khaled Abu Al-Rous wrote a play about a village love story called Tajouj. Along with other Sudanese or foreign plays, they were produced at the National Theatre of the time.

In a period of flourishing cultural life in Sudan from the 1960s and up to the restrictions of many public activities by the Public Order Laws since 1989, foreign and Sudanese theatre plays in the modern sense enjoyed a certain amount of popularity in Khartoum. Nevertheless, the College of Music and Drama of the Sudan University of Science and Technology has been offering studies and degrees since 1977, and together with the Sudanese Dramatists Union has organized theatre festivals and workshops at the National Theatre, opened in 1959 in Omdurman.

== Anthologies of Sudanese literature ==
After the 2009 collection of short stories in French translation, Nouvelles du Soudan, several anthologies in English, such as I Know Two Sudans: An Anthology of Creative Writing from Sudan and South Sudan, The Book of Khartoum, Literary Sudans: An Anthology of Literature from Sudan and South Sudan or Modern Sudanese Poetry: An Anthology have made contemporary literature from Sudan and South Sudan accessible to readers in translation. In addition, Banipal literary magazine published a special issue in 2016 on Sudanese literature today. In 2020, The Common literary magazine published 11 short stories by Sudanese authors in English translation.

Apart from those names already mentioned above, writers featured in these compilations are Mohammad Jamil Ahmad, Emad Blake, Nur al-Huda Mohammed Nur al-Huda, Ahmed Al Malik, Dan Lukudu, Agnes Ponilako, Kenyi A. Spencer, Mamoun Eltlib, and others.

In his introduction to Literary Sudans: An Anthology of Literature from Sudan and South Sudan, Taban Lo Liyong wrote:

In this collection most writers are rebels against the system or fighting a kind of existential war. [...] Third World artists during the decades of African independence from 1950 to 1970 were to assist the politicians in pushing for Cultural Revolution and independence, but after seeing how the politicians play loose with the blank check we gave them, it is high time the artists echoed the aspirations to democracy, respect for human rights and true nationalistic independence with emphasis on economic independence and welfare for us all.

— Taban Lo Lyiong

== Academic scholarship on Sudanese literature and Arabic language ==
An outstanding Sudanese scholar and literary critic with a long list of publications on poetry or other genres, and in Arabic in general, was Abdallah al-Tayyib (1921–2003). His primary field of study was the Arabic language and its creative use in poetry. One of his most notable works is A Guide to Understanding Arabic Poetry, a massive opus written over thirty-five years. Some of his collection of folk stories from Sudan and Africa have been translated into English. Al-Tayyib was also president of the Arab Language League of Sudan and a member of the Academy of the Arabic Language in Cairo. Through his radio programmes on literature, he contributed also to a wider appreciation of literature for people without access to written sources.

Another notable scholar on language and culture in Sudan was Awn Alsharif Qasim (1933–2006). Among many other works, he authored the Sudanese Encyclopedia of Tribes and Genealogies in seven volumes and 2628 pages, a pioneer, state of the art series of books about place or personal names and Sudanese tribes, their roots and origins.

In 2024, Sudanese scholar Hashim Mirghani was awarded the prestigious Katara Prize for Arabic Novel for his critical study The Novel as a Stage for Identity Debates and its Reconstruction.

Several departments of the University of Khartoum, like the Faculty of Arts, the Institute of Asian and African Studies or of Islamic Studies, publish academic scholarship relating to the history and present of literary culture in Sudan.

== Nonfiction and cultural journalism by Sudanese writers ==
The list of Sudanese writers of nonfiction, as another important form of narrative writing, includes authors like Abdullahi Ahmed An-Na'im or Sadiq al-Mahdi, known for their contributions to such topics as Islamic thought, politics or social issues in Sudan. Addressing Sudanese and other Arab readers, these are published in Arabic, although some publications, such as essays, academic scholarship, interviews or other journalistic texts, have also been translated into English.

One of the Sudanese online magazines focussing on Sudanese culture and the close relationship of life in Sudan and South Sudan, as well as with other East African neighbours, is the bilingual online Andariya Magazine.

== See also ==
- African literature
- Arabic literature
- Modern Arabic literature
- List of Sudanese writers
- Culture of Sudan
- Culture of South Sudan – Literature
- Music of Sudan

== Notes and references ==
=== Works cited ===
- Berkley, Constance E. (1981). "The Contours of Sudanese Literature". Africa Today. 28 (2): 109–118. ISSN 0001-9887. JSTOR 4186005.
- El-Nour, Eiman (1997). "The Development of Contemporary Literature in Sudan". Research in African Literatures. 28 (3): 150–162. ISSN 0034-5210. JSTOR 3821000.
- Luffin, Xavier (2017). "Sudan and South Sudan". In Hassan, Wail S. (ed.). The Oxford Handbook of Arab Novelistic Traditions. Oxford. pp. 421–439. doi:10.1093/oxfordhb/9780199349791.013.28.
