= Ibrahim Ishaq =

Sudanese literary writer (1946–2021)

- إبراهيم إسحق
- Born: 1946; Wada’a Village, East Darfur, Sudan
- Died: 23 January 2021 (aged 74–75)
- Education: MA in African Studies
- Alma mater: University of Khartoum
- Occupation(s): literary writer, novelist
- Years active: 1969-2004

Ibrahim Ishaq (Arabic: إبراهيم إسحق, 1946 – 23 January 2021), also referred to as Ibrāhīm Isḥāq Ibrāhīm, was a Sudanese novelist, short story writer and literary scholar.

Most of his narrative works are set in his native Darfur region of western Sudan. From 1969 on, he published six novels and three collections of short stories, as well as academic studies about the history and literature of Africa. Through his fiction and language, he introduced life and culture of Darfur to readers in other parts of the country.

== Life and artistic career ==
Ishaq was born in Wada’a village in today's state of East Darfur, Sudan, in 1946. After primary education in the cities of Al-Fashir and Omdurman, he graduated from the Teachers Training Institute in Omdurman in 1969 and worked as teacher of English in secondary schools. He obtained an M.A. degree from the University of Khartoum’s Institute for Afro–Asian Studies, where he also worked as a researcher. In the 1980s, he moved to Riyadh, Saudi Arabia, where he taught English until he returned to Sudan in 2006. In Sudan, he served as member of the jury for literary awards, such as the Al-Tayeb Salih Prize for Creative Writing, sponsored by Abdel Karim Merghani Cultural Centre as well as for the Al-Tayeb Salih International Award for Creative Writing.

In 1969, Ishaq published his first novel, It Happened in the Village, which was followed by five more novels and three collections of short stories. In his stories that take place in East Darfur, he made use of the local style of language and specific cultural references of his native region, which first alienated some readers in other regions of Sudan. In an interview with Sudanow magazine in 2017, Ishaq stated that there was no other option for him, but to make his characters talk like they do in real life.

According to literary critic Xavier Luffin, Ishaq's novel Akhbār al-bint Miyākāyā (The Story of the Young Girl Miyākāyā) was "the first important Sudanese historical novel and [...] also the first novel meaningfully to integrate the “Other,” the Southerner." The story begins in western Sudan with characters from Isḥāq's other novels: "Ḥāzim tells his friends all he knows about the first contacts between the Arabs and the Shilluks in the White Nile region during the sixteenth century. He recalls the story of Ghānim, an Arab who falls in love with a Dinka princess, Miyākāyā, which shows how long Arabs and Africans have intermarried and began to look like each other not only physically, but also in their way of speaking, the way they build their houses, and so on, which brings us back to the issue of Sudanese identity." Several of Ishaq's novels take place in a village called Kafa, where "the people of Kafa are an image of Sudan: a complex multicultural space, where Arabs from different tribes interact with many African peoples from Western Sudan and its surroundings, such as the Fur, the Masalit, the Mbororo, the Bilala, and the Kanembu".

In an obituary in Sudanow Magazine, the Sudanese Writers Union judged Ishaq's novels as innovative in language and subject-matter, presenting new images from western Sudan. In 2004, Ishaq was awarded an honorary doctorate from Al Fashir University. In January 2021, he died while on medical treatment in the United States, aged 75.

Ibrahim Ishaq is a really great writer with novels that presented majestic technical images from western Sudan, seen for the first time in Sudanese literature. It is a world nearly unknown to the people of central and northern Sudan.

— Renowned Sudanese writer Tayeb Salih, as quoted in Sudanow magazine 2021

== Selected works ==
The original Arabic titles are given in English translation:

Novels:

- It Happened in the Village (1969)
- The Works of Night and the Town (1971)
- The Old School Festival (1976)
- The Story of the Young Girl Miyākāyā (1980–2001)
- Turmoil in Kilimando (1999–2002)
- The Nourains Scandal (2004)

Short story collections:

- People From Kafa
- Tales From the Villages
- Kabbashiyya’s Petitions

In 2016, his short story The Opening in Kaltooma’s Fence was included in the anthology Literary Sudans, translated by Adil Babikir.

Among others, Ishaq's scholarly publications include The Emigrations of the Hilali Tribes from the Arabian Peninsula to North Africa and Bilad As-Sudan (1996) and The Folktale in Africa (1977). Further, he published numerous articles and studies about literary works and the heritage of his country in Sudanese and Arabic newspapers, periodicals and magazines.

== See also ==
- Sudanese literature
- List of Sudanese writers

== Literature ==
- El-Nour, Eiman. "The Development of Contemporary Literature in Sudan", Research in African Literatures, vol. 28, no. 3, 1997, pp. 150–162. JSTOR, www.jstor.org/stable/3821000.
- Luffin, Xavier (2017). "Sudan and South Sudan". In Hassan, Wail S. (ed.). The Oxford Handbook of Arab Novelistic Traditions. Oxford. pp. 424–430. doi:10.1093/oxfordhb/9780199349791.013.28.
- Shringarpure, Bhakti (ed.) (2016), Literary Sudans: An Anthology of Literature from Sudan and South Sudan. Trenton: The Red Sea Press, ISBN 978-1569024348
