= Jamal Mohammed Ibrahim =

Sudanese ambassador, novelist and poet

- Born: April 7, 1949 (age 77)
- Occupations: poet, novelist and diplomat

Jamal Mohammed Ibrahim (Arabic: جمال محمد إبراهيم; born 7 April 1949) is a Sudanese poet, novelist and former diplomat. He received his B.Sc. degree with honors in social anthropology in 1973 from the University of Khartoum. After two years at the Sudanese Ministry of Culture, he worked for the Ministry of Foreign Affairs from 1975 to 2009.

He also wrote for Sudanese and Arabic newspapers, published in Khartoum, London and in Lebanon. As a literary writer, he has been noted for his treatment of the complex Sudanese history and identity, based both on African and Arab heritage.

== Life and career ==
Ibrahim began his work in the Sudanese Ministry of Culture, Information and Tourism between 1973 and 1975, then in the Sudanese Ministry of Foreign Affairs between 1975 and 2009. He served as Sudan's ambassador to Lebanon between 2006 and 2009.

Ibrahim worked as journalist for the online Sudanese newspaper "Sudanile" and for the “Al-Araby Al-Jadeed” and “Sudan Today” newspaper in Sudan. He has published a number of articles, translations and other literary works in London-based newspapers Al-Hayat, Asharq Al-Awsat, Azzaman as well as in An-Nahar and As-Safir newspapers in Lebanon.

As novelist, he treated the complex Sudanese identity of African and Arab heritage: In his Nuqṭat talāshī (A Point of Disappearance, 2008), he described one of his characters as “a perfect and typical Sudanese, who has taken something from each background: he has taken his pleasant brown color from Africa, and his loquacity from the Arabs.” In Dafātir Kambālā (The Kampala Notebooks, 2009), he explored the African roots of Sudan through a “philosophical journey” in Uganda. Based on this literary approach, he was described by literary scholar Xavier Luffin as one of the Sudanese writers who included "African names, realistic descriptions of traditions and beliefs, and even words in African languages."

== Works ==
Ibrahim has published several literary works in Arabic, including:

- You are the Woman of the Sea (Arabic: Imra’at al-bahr...anti), poetry collection, published by Riad El-Rayyes Books, Beirut, 2007.
- A Point of Disappearance (Arabic: "Nuqṭat al-talāshī).

, novel, published by Dar Al Saqi, Beirut, 2008.

- "The Kampala Notebooks" (Arabic: "Dafātir Kambālā"), a novel, published by Dar Nelson Beirut / Sweden, 2009.
- The Colonial Diplomacy: Notes and Reading in British Documents on the Establishment of the Sudanese Ministry of Foreign Affairs (Arabic: aldiblumasia alkulunialia: mulahazat waqira'at fi alwathayiq albiritania ean nash'at wizarat alkharijia alsuwdania), study, published by Dar Nelson Beirut / Sweden, 2009.
- A Knife in the Waist of the Horizon (Arabic: Sikin fi khasirat alafiq), poetry collection, published by Riad El-Rayyes Books, Beirut 2009.
- It's Time to Leave (Arabic: han 'awan alrahil), novel, published by Arab Scientific Publishers, Beirut, 2010.
- The Last Trip of a military Officer, Publication Authority, Khartoum 2013.
- The Last Coptic Notebooks (Arabic: dafatir alqibtii al'akhir), novel, published by Madarat Publishing House, Khartoum, 2017.
- Noor: Amber Fallout (Arabic: nur: tadaei alkahraman), novel, published by Madarat Publishing House, Khartoum, 2019.
- "Omer Adeel: A Sudanese Noble Diplomat", a biography, Madarat publishing House, Khartoum, 2004.
- "Muanasat: epistolary literature",(Arabic letters exchanged by two Sudanese writers)Published by Barcode Publishers, Sudan, 2024.

== Awards & honors ==
Ibrahim received The National Order of the Cedar in rank of Senior Officer from the Republic of Lebanon in April 2009.

== See also ==
- Sudanese literature
- List of Sudanese writers
