= Izz al-Din Manasirah =

Palestinian poet and critic (1946–2021)

Izz Al-Din Manasirah
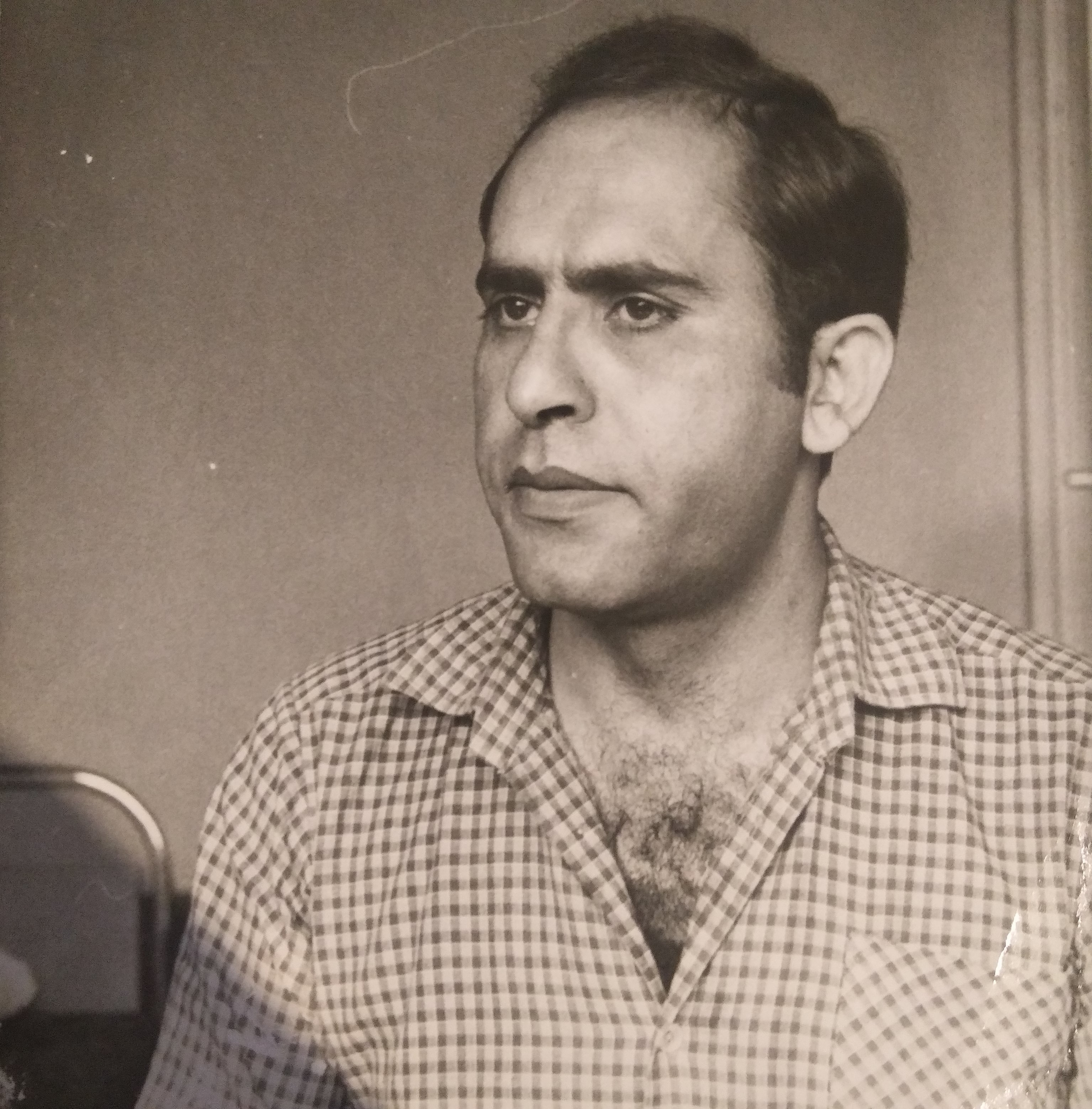
- Manasirah in mid-1970s
- Born: 11 April 1946; Bani Naim, Mandatory Palestine
- Died: 5 April 2021 (aged 74); Amman, Jordan
- Occupations: Academic, poet

Izz Al-Din Manasirah (Note: also spelled: Ezzedine Al Manasara.; Ezzedine Al-Manasra.) Arabic: عز الدين المناصرة — 11 April 1946 – 5 April 2021) was a Palestinian poet, critic, intellectual and academic born in the town of Bani Naim, Hebron Governorate, Palestine. Winner of several prizes as a cadet and an academic, he was a poet of the Palestinian resistance from the late 1960s on, and his name was associated with armed and cultural resistance. He was held in such high regard as poets Mahmoud Darwish, Samih al-Qasim and Tawfiq Ziad, or as they are collectively called, the "Big Four in Palestinian Poetry." He sang poems by Marcel Khalife and others and was famous for his poems "Jafra" and "In Green We Enshrouded Him contributed to the development of modern Arab poetry and the development of methodologies for cultural criticism. He was described by Ehsan Abbas as one of the pioneers of the modern poetic movement.

He received a degree in Arabic and Islamic Science from Cairo University in 1968, and began his poetry career. He then moved to Jordan and served as director of cultural programmers on Jordanian radio from 1970 to 1973. In the same period, he founded the Jordanian Writers' Association with a few Jordanian intellectuals and writers.

He joined the Palestinian revolution after moving to Beirut, where he volunteered for the military resistance. In parallel he continued his work in the Palestinian cultural sphere and the cultural resistance as an independent, as well as within the institutions of the revolution as cultural editor of the PLO magazine Palestine Revolution and as editor-in-chief of the Journal of Battle published during the siege of Beirut, in addition to serving as editorial secretary of the Journal of Palestine Studies of the Palestinian Research Center in Beirut.

He was elected as a member of the Joint Palestinian-Lebanese Forces Military Command in the area south of Beirut during the beginning of the 1976 Lebanese Civil War. He was assigned by Yasser Arafat to run a school for the sons and daughters of the Tel Zaater camp after the remaining residents of the camp were displaced to the Lebanese village of Damour.

He later completed his post-graduate studies, obtaining a degree in modern Bulgarian literature and a doctorate degree in modern criticism and comparative literature at Sofia University in 1981. After returning to Beirut in 1982, he rejoined the resistance during the siege of Beirut, overseeing the publication of the "Battle Gaza" until he left Beirut as part of a deal to end the siege.

Manasirah moved between several countries before being landed by Al-Rahal in Algeria in 1983, where he worked as a professor of literature at the University of Constantine and then the University of Tlemcen. In the early 1990s, he moved to Jordan, where he founded the Department of Arabic at the Open University of Jerusalem (before moving its headquarters to Palestine), after which he became Director of the Educational Science Faculty of the Palestine Refugee Agency (UNRWA) and the University of Philadelphia, where he obtained the rank of Professor in 2005. He has received several awards in literature, including: the Jordanian State Poetry Prize in 1995, and the Jerusalem Prize in 2011.

== Biography ==
=== Childhood in Palestine (1946–1964) ===
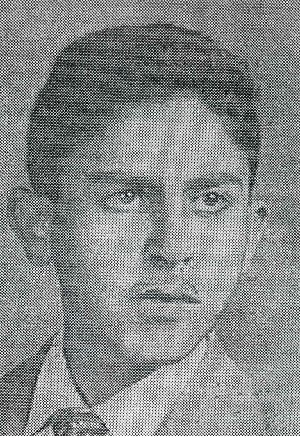
Manasirah in 1963

Muhammad Izz al-Din Manasirah was born on April 11, 1946, in the then Mandate village of Na'im in Palestine. His father, Sheikh Izz Al-Din Abdul Qadir Manasirah, was an ally of the Hebron region and a clan arbitrator, and his grandfather was a popular poet in Mount Hebron from the early 20th century until his death in 1941. His mother was Nafesa Mosa Manasirah. Manasirah had three brothers.

He worked as a Jordanian postal employee and translated the novel Around the World in 80 Days by Jules Verne into Arabic. Abbas completed his studies at the University of Damascus and worked in the teaching profession with literature and research in Islamic grammar, history and literature.

He began his studies at Beni Naim elementary school and then attended Al Hussein Ben Ali High School in Hebron. From his young age, he organized poetry and published articles in popular literary journals at the beginning of 1962. The poetry of Manasirah was influenced by the place where he grew up, where he had a close connection with the mythology, popular culture and lifestyle associated with the region's long history, from the emergence of Canaanites in the Bronze Age to the modern era. This influence emerged in his vocabulary and advocacy for concepts associated with the ancient and modern history of Palestine.

=== Egypt Phase (1964–1970) ===
On 15 October 1964, he left Palestine via the Qalandia Airport in Jerusalem for Cairo to attend Cairo University in the United Arab Republic, where he obtained a degree in Arabic and Islamic Science in 1968. Joined the General Federation of Students of Palestine - Cairo Chapter and joined the Egyptian Literary Society. He worked as a reporter for Jerusalem's "New Horizon" magazine (1964–1966), Beirut's "Freedom Supplement" magazine (1965–1966), the magazine "Target" (1969), headed by Ghassan Kanafani, and Beirut, which has been edited by Syrian poet Adunis since its publication in 1968. During the Cairo phase, he won the 1968 Egyptian University Prize in Poetry, when it was first awarded to action poems, which were still not recognized as a poetic pattern by the dominant generation of traditional poets at the time. The protagonist met periodically with Najib Mahfouz as part of their activity at the Feather Café.

Also in that period, the poet became known as "Azzuddin" rather than "Muhammad," and carried that name ever afterwards. While in Cairo, he witnessed the events of Israel's 1967 war against neighbouring Arab states, which ended in Israel's 6-day victory, and resulted in the loss of the West Bank and the Gaza Strip, and the occupation of other Arab territories. This event marked a milestone in the life of Manasirah, since he was unable to return to Bani Naim. The war was also an emotional shock and contributed to his later poetic experience. In the aftermath of the war, he volunteered for military training by the Palestine Liberation Army (PLA) in Egypt, where the core of armed popular Palestinian resistance had begun to expand. However, Manasirah had begun his regimental career when he volunteered in the military course at Cairo University, summer 1967, after the Six-Day War. The PLA was tasked with training Palestinian students in the use of weapons.

=== Jordan phase (1970–1973) ===
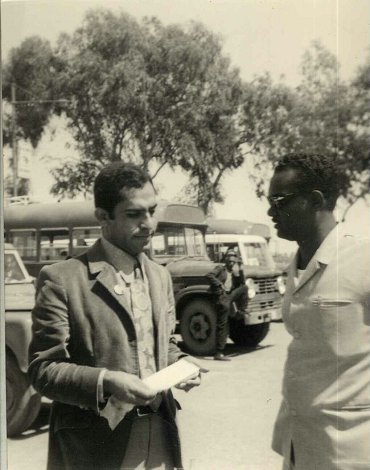
Manasirah along with Salah Ahmed Ibrahim in Basra, Iraq in 1971

He moved to Jordan and contributed to the building of the cultural landscape in Jordan with selected Jordanian and Palestinian intellectuals, serving as director of cultural programmers on Jordanian radio from 1970 to 1973. During the same period, he founded the Jordanian Writers' Association with a few Jordanian intellectuals and writers. He was elected as a member (rapporteur) of the Preparatory Committee, along with such figures as Mahmoud Saifuddin of Iran, Isa Nawari, Mahmoud Samra, lawyer Adi Madanat, and publisher Osama Sha'aa. He had a close friendship with Jordanian novelist Tisr Spol, strengthened during their work together on Jordanian radio. Al-Nasir lived through the bloody events of Black September between Palestinian organizations and the Jordanian regime, but was not involved despite his cultural activity in support of Tahrir. Following Black September, he was harassed by security authorities, as were many Palestinian and Jordanian figures supporting the work and the Liberation Organization, and was forced to leave for Beirut on 14 March 1974.

=== Lebanon phase (1974–1982) ===
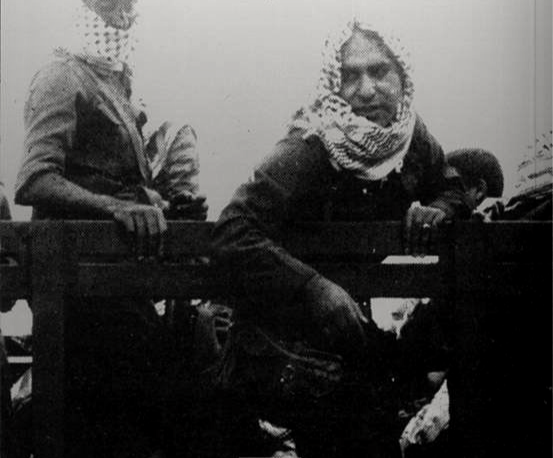
Manasirah during the evacuation of Palestinians, following the Siege of Beirut in September 1982

Manasirah moved to Beirut to join the Palestinian revolution. He volunteered in the ranks of the military resistance in parallel with his work in the Palestinian cultural field and the cultural resistance as an independent, as well as within the institutions of the revolution, as a cultural editor of the Palestine Revolution-speaking magazine Palestine, in addition to serving as editorial secretary of the Palestinian Affairs Journal of the Palestinian Research Centre in Beirut. He was elected as a member of the Joint Palestinian-Lebanese Forces Military Command in the area south of Beirut during the beginning of the 1976 Lebanese Civil War. He was assigned by Yasser Arafat to run a school for the sons and daughters of the Tel Zaater camp after the residents of the camp were displaced to the Lebanese village of Damour. During the Israeli invasion of Lebanon and the siege of Beirut, he served as editor-in-chief of the Journal of Battle (published during the siege of Beirut).

In this war, many Palestinian camps were attacked and massacres such as the Karentina massacre and the Tel Zater camp massacre were perpetrated. He participated in military operations after receiving military training (the Karameh Course), in Beirut, 1976, where he volunteered to fight in southern Lebanon and fought in the Battle of Kfarshoba in January 1976 against the Israeli army. He was elected as a member of the command of the South Beirut Front (Al-Shayyah - Ein al-Ramana) in the Joint Palestinian-Lebanese Forces in 1976, and took charge of several military hubs in the South Beirut area: Maroon Musk, Marmkhail Church, Aboulloy - Rosalie War. In June 1976, Manasirah led the Battle of the Mills, to ease the siege of the Tel Zaater camp, which was destroyed on 12 August 1976 and abandoned its people. At the time of the Israeli invasion of Lebanon in 1982, his awareness-raising activities were restricted to the newspaper Battle, but he fought in the Battle of the Museum in August 1982 during the Siege of Beirut. He recounted the details of the first phase of the Lebanese Civil War in the book The Lovers of Sand and Manares. At the end of the Lebanese phase of the organization and the work of the armed forces, as well as of the supporters, a deal was signed through an American-Arab mediation for the exit of Al-Mutama and the Palestinian guerrillas in exchange for the cessation of Israeli bombardment and the safety of the camps following the exit of the militants. He then left on a Greek ship by sea to Tartus, Syria, with the forces of the Palestine Liberation Organization (PLO).

=== Later life ===
Manasirah lived in Algeria from 1983 to 1991, before settling in Jordan. He died on 5 April 2021, in Amman, due to complications related to COVID-19.

== Poetry collections ==
Manasirah's collections of poetry:

1. Hebron, Cairo-Beirut, 1968.
2. Exit from the Dead Sea, Beirut, 1969.
3. Diary of the Dead Sea, Beirut, 1969.
4. Qamar Jarrah was sad, Beirut, 1974.
5. Balgark Kannah, Beirut, 1976.
6. Jafra, Beirut, 1981.
7. Kananya, Beirut, 1981.
8. Lover space of Oasis spray.
9. Canaanite Pastoral, Cyprus, 1992.
10. I don't trust a cuckoo, Ramallah, 2000.
11. No Roof for Heaven, Amman, 2009.
12. Glowing Kanaan (Poetic Selections), Dar Warud, Amman, 2008.

Anthologies

- When the Words Burn: An Anthology of Modern Arabic Poetry 1945–1987, translated and edited by Jon Mikhail Asfour, Dunvegan, Ontario: Cormorant Books, 1988.

== Critical and intellectual books ==
1. Palestinian Art, Palestine Revolt Publications, Beirut, 1975.
2. 20th century Israeli cinema, Beirut, 1975.
3. The Problems of the Prose Poem, Beirut-Ramallah 1998.
4. Encyclopedia of Palestinian Figurative Art of the 20th century (in two volumes), Amman, 2003.
5. Criticism of Poetry in the 20th Century, Sail Publishing and Distribution, Amman, 2012.
6. Palestinian Cessation Takes Over American Bread - Sail for Publication and Distribution Oman 2013.
7. Comparative cultural criticism - 2005 - Poetry 2007 - Poetic Text Grammar 2007.

== Awards ==
- First Prize in Poetry, Egyptian Universities, Donor: Presidency of Cairo University, United Arab Republic, 1968.
- Order of Jerusalem, donor: Central Committee of the Democratic Front for the Liberation of Palestine, 1993.
- Galep Halsa Award for Cultural Creativity, donor: Jordanian Writers' Association, Amman, Jordan, 1994.
- State Prize of Recognition in Literature (Field of Poetry), donor: Ministry of Culture of Jordan, Amman, 1995.
- Sword Canaan Award, donor: Palestinian Fatah Movement, 1998.
- Academic Excellence Award, Teaching Excellence, Donor: University of Philadelphia, 2005.
- Distinguished Scholar in the Humanities Award, for his book: Donor: Ministry of Higher Education of Jordan, 2008.
- Jerusalem Prize, Donor, General Union of Arab Performers and Writers, Cairo - July 2011.

== See also ==
- Falastin Al Thawra
- Hussein Al-Manasra
