= Adil Babikir =

Sudanese literary translator and critic

Adil Babikir (Arabic: عادل بابكر) is a Sudanese literary critic and translator into and out of English and Arabic. He has translated several novels, short stories, and poems by renowned Sudanese writers and edited the Modern Sudanese Poetry anthology. He lives and works in Abu Dhabi, United Arab Emirates.

== Biography ==
Babikir graduated from the Faculty of Arts, University of Khartoum, and holds an M.A. in Translation from the Faculty of Languages, Sudan University of Science and Technology. Babikir was employed by the state-run Sudan News Agency (SUNA), in its English news desk. Later, he moved to Saudi Arabia and worked for several business and general translation companies. Next, he joined the US Embassy in Riyadh as information officer for more than ten years. He then moved to the United Arab Emirates, working in translation and business promotion for several companies.

Babikir's translations to English have appeared in Africa World Press, Banipal, Al-Dawha Magazine, and others. His published translations include The Jungo: Stakes of the Earth and The Messiah of Darfur, excerpted in the Los Angeles Review of Books, by Abdel Aziz Baraka Sakin, and Mansi: A Rare Man on his Own Way by Sudanese writer Tayeb Salih. For the latter, he received the 2020 Sheikh Hamad Translation Award. Further, Babikir translated Summer Maize (2017), a collection of short stories by Sudanese-British writer Leila Aboulela, from English to Arabic.

Babikir is the editor and translator of the anthology Modern Sudanese Poetry, published in 2019. Further, he translated the texts of Literary Sudans: An anthology of literature from Sudan and South Sudan. His study, The Beauty Hunters: Sudanese Bedouin Poetry, Evolution and Impact, described as a complement to works on Sudan’s diverse cultural identity, was published in 2023 by University of Nebraska Press. On this occasion, the literary magazine ArabLit published part of the book's first chapter, with excerpts about Sudanese writer Al-Ḥārdallo’s life and poems. The Beauty Hunters was selected by Brittle Paper literary magazine as one of the 100 Notable African Books of 2023.

Among his literary criticism works, Babikir published an essay in 2013, two years after the independence of South Sudan, about South Sudanese writer Mongo Zambeiri writing on the conflict between politics and culture. In 2021, Babikir received the Africa Institute's Global Africa Translation Fellowship. Further, he has contributed several translations to literary magazines, such as Banipal and ArabLit & ArabLit Quarterly.

== See also ==
- Sudanese literature
- List of Sudanese writers
