= Salah Ahmed Ibrahim =

Sudanese literary writer, poet and diplomat

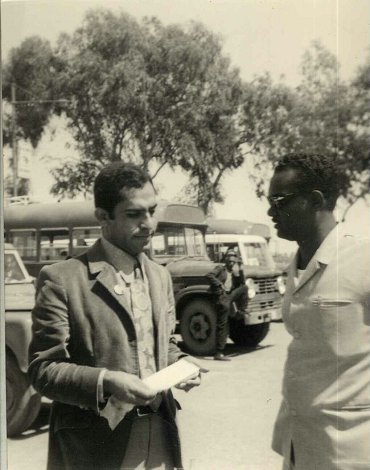
Salah Ahmed Ibrahim (right) along with Izz al-Din Manasirah in Basra, Iraq in 1971

Salah Ahmed Ibrahim (Arabic: صلاح أحمد إبراهيم; December 1933 – May 1993), was a Sudanese literary writer, poet and diplomat. He is considered one of the most important Sudanese poets of the first generation after the country's independence, marking the transition from literary romanticism to social realism.

== Life and political activity ==
Born in Omdurman, Ibrahim graduated from the University of Khartoum, Faculty of Arts, and, from 1965 to 1966, taught at the Institute of African Studies at the University of Ghana. He maintained an involvement in politics and was eventually appointed Sudanese Ambassador to Algeria.

His sister Fatima Ahmed Ibrahim was a leading parliamentarian and a campaigner for women's rights. He died in May 1993 in Paris, France.

== Literary works ==
In a literary study about Sudanese poetry, Salah Ibrahim was described as "the most important Sudanese poet of his generation", as "in his poetry, there is all the yearning, all the frustration of his generation. He writes his poetry with miraculous ease and beauty." Ibrahim was also noted for his socialist realist fiction, of which he was a notable proponent.

In an article published in May 2022, translator and editor of the compilation Modern Sudanese Poetry: an Anthology, Adil Babikir characterized the poetry of Salah Ahmed Ibrahim "as a mirror of major turbulences in his country and in Africa more generally". Further, Ibrahim was called "an outspoken campaigner against oppression and injustice and a strong voice in support of human rights and national aspirations". In the same article, Babikir published excerpts of Ibrahim's poems dealing with questions of identity, racism and political suppression in English translation.

== Selected works ==
- Gha'bat El-Abanois, Arabic غابة الأبنوس or Ebony Forest, poetry collection.
- Gha'dbat El-Haba'y, Arabic غضبة الهبباى or Rage of El-Heba'y, poetry collection.

== See also ==
- Sudanese literature
- List of Sudanese writers
