= Yassin Adnan =

Moroccan writer and broadcaster (born 1970)

- Born: 1970 (age 55–56); Safi, Morocco
- Occupations: Journalist, writer

Yassin Adnan (born 1970) is a Moroccan writer and broadcaster. He was born in Safi, but grew up in Marrakesh. As a journalist, he has been heavily engaged with the Moroccan cultural scene since the 1990s, publishing literary magazines and hosting the television programme Masharif from 2006 onwards. He has written books of poetry, short story collections, and works of non-fiction, including a study of the writer Fatima Mernissi. His debut novel Hot Maroc (2016) was nominated for the Arabic Booker Prize. The novel was translated to French and English.
