= ArabLit =

Literary online magazine and publisher

ArabLit magazine
- Logo for ArabLit magazine
- Editor: Marcia Lynx Qualey
- Categories: online literary magazine
- Frequency: daily
- Publisher: ArabLit & ArabLit Quarterly
- First issue: 2009
- Language: English
- Website: www.arablit.org

ArabLit is an online magazine for information about translations of Arabic literature into English. The editors also publish ArabLit Quarterly as a print and electronic magazine, books with selected contemporary Arabic literary works and a daily newsletter about current publications of different genres of Arabic literature in English translation. Further, ArabLit's promotion of Arabic literature in English has been distinguished by British and Canadian literary awards.

== History and profile ==
ArabLit was founded in 2009 as a blog and has since developed into a source of daily news and views on Arabic literature and translation. On its webpage, in podcasts and its YouTube channel, ArabLit has published translations, essays and reviews of Arabic literature, often curated by contributing editors, background information on writers and their works, interviews with authors, translators, agents, publishers, booksellers, and booktubers, as well as resources for translators.

Since 2018, ArabLit Quarterly (ALQ) has published thematic magazines, titled for example The Song or Mirrors, presenting original translations of poetry, essays, short stories and graphic art from different Arab countries. Among many others, authors featured in ArabLit Quarterly have been Zakaria Tamer, Rasha Abbas, Salim Barakat, Abdallah Zrika, Nazik Al-Malaika, Layla Balabakki, Yassin Adnan, and Abdelaziz Baraka Sakin. ArabLit Quarterly is produced and distributed in North America and Europe in print copies, as well as in electronic publications (PDF & e-pub). The ArabLit Story Prize, launched in 2018, is an award for remarkable works in any genre, newly translated from Arabic into English. In 2020, ALQ Books announced their first limited-edition book, a collection of short stories by Palestinian author Samira Azzam, translated by Ranya Abdel Rahman, with an introduction by Adania Shibli and foreword by Joseph Farag.

Apart from ArabLit's founder and editor-in-chief, Marcia Lynx Qualey, the editorial team is made up of contributing and guest editors, with special focus on Algerian, Iraqi, Sudanese or other Arabic literatures. In an article about the literary qualities of books by Arab writers and in relationship to their cultural background in German magazine Dis:Orient, Qualey was quoted that she firmly believes in translation as an art form different from writing, that is nevertheless a separate creative act.

ArabLit, ArabLit Quarterly and ALQ Books are produced by a crowd-funded collective, supported by subscribers and, to a lesser extent, advertisers. According to the editors, they have no affiliation with any institution and do not receive any institutional support.

Lynx Qualey also has translated Arabic novels for young readers, such as Thunderbirds by Palestinian writer Sonia Nimr, written on Arabic books for teens and participated in academic forums. She and other literary translators and consultants publish the website ArabKidLitNow!, promoting translated Arabic literature written for children and young readers. Further, she has written articles about Arabic literature and translations for the online magazine qantara.de and news channels such as Middle East Eye and Al-Jazeera News. For her "huge impact on the amount and range of Arabic literature available in English today", Lynx Qualey was distinguished with the 2024 Ottaway Award for the Promotion of International Literature, named in honour of the first chair of Words Without Borders magazine, Jim Ottaway, Jr.

Following several daily newsletters about literature and writers from Gaza during the war in Gaza, ArabLit Quarterly's spring 2024 issue was published in cooperation with Gaza literary magazine Majalla 28, presenting literature and fine art from the Gaza territory.

== Arabic women in translation ==
Every August, ArabLit highlights literature by Arab women during the Women in Translation Month, founded by the book blogger Meytal Radzinski in 2014. This initiative, related to the Three Percent website at University of Rochester, has stressed the small number of international translated books of only 3% in the US book market. ArabLit's Women in Translation Month highlights Arab women's presence in English translations, both as authors, translators, graphic artists or literary scholars. On average, 70% of Arabic translations to English have been works by Arab male authors. The remaining 30% of translations were written by women, while many of the authors and the majority of translators of contemporary Arab literature are women. Referring to publishers' recent interest in Arab women writers, often just based on stereotypical attitudes towards women and regardless of their works' literary value, ArabLit quoted Syrian writer Abeer Esber who said that “Unfortunately, women in Arab countries are currently finding it easier, for all the wrong reasons, to find a publisher for their books.”

The recommended books for 2022 included fiction by Malika Moustadraf, Sonia Nimr, Jokha al-Harthi, Maya Abu al-Hayyat, Samira Azzam, Bushra Al-Maqtari, Stella Gaitano and Djamila Morani.

== Awards ==
In 2017, ArabLit won the Literary Translation Initiative Award at the London Book Fair. The magazine Broken Pencil distinguished ArabLit Quarterly's edition The Strange with their 2019 Zine Award as Best Literary Microjournal, based on “The kaleidoscope of works… [...] striking in their individual depth and relative divergence.”

== See also ==
- Modern Arabic literature
- Contemporary Arabic literature by women
- List of Arabic-English translators
