= Jamal Mahjoub =

British writer of Sudanese-British origins

- Born: 1960 (age 65–66); London, England
- Education: University of Sheffield
- Occupation: Writer
- Writing career
- Pen name: Parker Bilal
- Genres: Literature, crime fiction
- Notable works: A Line in the River. Khartoum, City of Memory (2018)
- Website: jamalmahjoub.com

Jamal Mahjoub (born 1960) is a writer of British and Sudanese parentage. He writes in English and has published eight novels under his own name, as well as a travel memoir, A Line in the River. Khartoum, City of Memory (2018). In 2012, Mahjoub began writing a series of crime fiction novels under the pseudonym Parker Bilal.

== Background ==
Born in London, England, in 1960, to an English mother and Sudanese father, Jamal Mahjoub lived in Liverpool for his earliest few years, until moving with his family to his father's country of origin. Mahjoub was raised and attended school in Khartoum, where his family remained until 1990. After winning a scholarship to attend Atlantic College in South Wales, he returned to England and later studied geology at the University of Sheffield.

== Published work ==
Writing in The Observer, Zoë Heller described Mahjoub's first novel, Navigation of a Rainmaker (1989), as providing "a rich picture, both of Africa's vast, seemingly insuperable problems – and of the moral dilemmas faced by a well-meaning, ineffectual stranger". Wings of Dust (1994), Mahjoub's second novel, explores the legacy of the first generation of Northern Sudanese who were educated in the West in the 1950s and inherited the task of creating the newly independent nation. In the Hour of Signs (1996) recounts the story of the Mahdi, who led a revolt in 19th-century Turko-Egyptian Sudan, expelling the Khedive Ismail's troops. According to the TLS, the novel conveys "A profound awareness that man refuses to learn from history, because he is blind to the guises in which it repeats itself." In the process General Gordon was killed, which led to the British Reconquest and the formation of the Anglo-Egyptian Sudan in 1898. World Literature Today noted that "Mahjoub's first three novels can be loosely read as a trilogy of political events in Sudan. Emulating the turmoil and uncertainty of the Sudan, his writing distinguishes itself by its dynamism".

The Carrier (1998) is split between the early 17th century and present-day Denmark, where an archaeological find reveals a link to a visitor from the Arab world in medieval times. The novel's astronomical theme centres on the intercultural transmission of knowledge through the translation of Arabic sources which led to the discovery of Heliocentricity and the work of Danish astronomer Tycho Brahe. Travelling with Djinns (2003) tells the story of Yasin, a man with a similar background to the author, who absconds with his young son Leo and travels through Europe in a Peugeot 504. In The Drift Latitudes (2006), Rachel, following the death of her son, becomes aware of the existence of a half-sister, Jade; the product of a relationship her father had late in life. The novel depicts life around a jazz club in Liverpool frequented by African sailors in the 1960s. Nubian Indigo (2006) addresses the author's Nubian heritage on his father's side. The novel uses a mixture of fable and multiple characters to describe events around the evacuation of Nubian villages as a consequence of the raising of the Aswan High Dam. The novel was first published in French in 2006.

His non-fiction writing includes the travel memoir A Line in the River: Khartoum, City of Memory (2018), which was longlisted for the Ondaatje Prize. He has published a range of non-fiction, including: The New York Times; Granta; Guernica magazine; Selmeyyah; Life Under Lockdown (Gaza); The Halflife of a Revolution. He has also contributed to the Palestine Festival of Literature (PalFest) anthology This is not a Border (Bloomsbury, 2017) and The Best American Essays (Harper Collins 2008).

A brother-in-law of the novelist Leila Aboulela, he wrote in 2022 of his difficult relationship with his siblings.

== Critical reception and awards ==
Mahjoub's work has been broadly acclaimed and translated into several European languages. In 1993, "The Cartographer's Angel" by Mahjoub won a one-off short story prize organised by The Guardian newspaper in conjunction with the publisher Heinemann Books, judged by Adewale Maja-Pearce, Margaret Busby and Ian Mayes.

In the 2000s, work by Mahjoub received much attention in Europe. In 2001, in Italy, he was a finalist for the La cultura del mare prize started by Alberto Moravia. In 2004, in France, The Carrier (French: Le Télescope de Rachid) won the Prix de L’Astrolabe, an award given annually at the Etonnants Voyageurs festival in St Malo. In 2005, Mahjoub's "The Obituary Tango" was shortlisted for the Caine Prize for African Writing, and in 2006, a short story, "Carrer Princesa", won the NH Hotels Mario Vargas Llosa prize for short stories.

== Parker Bilal ==
In 2012, Mahjoub began publishing crime fiction under the pseudonym "Parker Bilal". The Golden Scales (2012) was the first of a ten novel series set in Cairo featuring the exiled Sudanese detective Makana. It was a finalist for the Prix du Polar Européen in 2015. As of 2022, six books have been published with a further four planned. Mahjoub subsequently began a UK-set series of crime novels featuring detective Drake and forensic psychologist Crane, the first entry of which was The Divinities (2019). This was followed by The Heights(2020) and The Trenches(2022).

== Bibliography ==
=== As Jamal Mahjoub ===
- Navigation of a Rainmaker (1989)
- Wings of Dust (1994)
- In the Hour of Signs (1996)
- The Carrier (1998)
- Travelling With Djinns (2003)
- The Drift Latitudes (2006)
- Nubian Indigo (2006)
- A Line in the River: Khartoum, City of Memory (2018)
- The Fugitives (Canongate Books, 2021)

=== As Parker Bilal ===
Makana series

Focuses on Makana, an exiled Sudanese ex-policeman working as a private detective in Cairo.

- The Golden Scales (Bloomsbury, 2012)
- Dogstar Rising (Bloomsbury, 2013)
- The Ghost Runner (Bloomsbury, 2014)
- The Burning Gates (Bloomsbury, 2015)
- City of Jackals (Bloomsbury, 2016)
- Dark Water (Bloomsbury, 2017)

Crane and Drake series

Set in London, the protagonists are Dr Rayhana Crane, a forensic psychologist, and Calil Dark, a police officer turned private detective.

- The Divinities (The Indigo Press, 2019)
- The Heights (Severn House Publishers, 2020)
- The Trenches (Canongate Books, 2022)

== See also ==
- Sudanese literature
- History of Sudan

== Literature ==
- Ben Amara, Ahmed (5 October 2023). "The Politics of space in Leila Aboulela's Minaret and Jamal Mahjoub's A Line in the River: Khartoum, City of Memory". International Journal of Arabic-English Studies. doi:10.33806/ijaes.v24i1.551. ISSN 1680-0982.
