= List of Sudanese writers =

Flag of Sudan	Coat of Arms
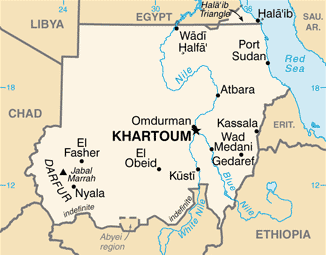

This is a list of prominent Sudanese writers.

== Historians ==
- Abdulaziz Abdul Ghani Ibrahim (1939–2022)

== Islamic reformist writers ==
- Abdullahi Ahmed An-Na'im (born 1946)
- Mahmoud Mohamed Taha (1909–1985)
- Hassan al-Turabi (1932–2016)

== Journalists, literary critics and editors ==
- Mohammed Taha Mohammed Ahmed (died 2006)
- Abdul Raheem Glailati
- Alfred Taban (1957–2019)
- Adil Babikir

== Novelists and short story writers ==
- Leila Aboulela (born 1964)
- Fatin Abbas
- Abdelaziz Baraka Sakin (born 1963)
- Malkat Ed-Dar Mohamed (1920–1969)
- Bushra Elfadil (born 1952), also poet
- Reem Gaafar (born 1982), also non-fiction writer
- Ibrahim Ishaq (1946–2021)
- Ali El-Makk (1937–1992), also translator and poet
- Jamal Mohammed Ibrahim, also poet
- Jamal Mahjoub (born 1960), British writer with Sudanese roots
- Rania Mamoun (born 1979)
- Ra'ouf Mus'ad (born 1937), also connected with Egypt
- Hamed al-Nazir (born 1975)
- Tayeb Salih (1929–2009)
- Sabah Sanhouri (born 1990)
- Mansour El Souwaim (born 1970)
- Amir Taj al-Sir (born 1960)
- Hammour Ziada (born 1977)

== Poets ==
- Muhammad Ahmad Mahgoub (1908–1976)
- Al-Tijani Yusuf Bashir (1912–1937)
- Gely Abdel Rahman (1931–1990)
- Salah Ahmed Ibrahim (1933–1993)
- Muhammed El-Faytori (1936–2015)
- Ibrahim 'Ali Salman (1937–1995)
- Abed Elrahim Abu Zakrra (1943–1989)
- Mohammed Abdul-Hayy (1944–1989)
- Mahjoub Sharif (1948–2014)
- Al-Saddiq Al-Raddi (born 1969)
- Mohammed Abdalbari (born 1985)
- Safia Elhillo (born 1990)
- Najlaa Eltom (born 1975)
- Muhammad al-Mahdi al-Majdhub (1919–1982)

== Political writers ==
- Abel Alier (born 1933)
- Fatima Ahmed Ibrahim (1933–2017)
- Abdulaziz Abdul Ghani Ibrahim (1939–2022)
- Sadiq al-Mahdi (1936–2020)
- Abdel Khaliq Mahjub (died 1971)
- Muhammad Ibrahim Nugud (1930–2012)
- Muhammad Sa'id al-Qaddal (1935–2008)

== Satirical writers ==
- Jaafar Abbas

== See also ==
- List of Sudanese people
- Sudanese literature
