= Sudanese Writers Union =

Professional association of Sudanese writers

The Sudanese Writers Union was founded in Khartoum in 1985, the year that democracy was restored in Sudan for a short period. The Union promotes dialogue and seeks solutions for conflicts in Sudan. It emphasizes freedom of expression within a multicultural society and tries to bring together writers of different cultural groups. The first secretary-general until 1986 was Ali El-Maak.

== History and political repression ==
In 1989, four years after the Union's founding, a coup d'état took place, resulting in the organization being banned and expelled from the historic building in Khartoum. Members of the Union were arrested and tortured. It took until shortly after the signing of the Comprehensive Peace Agreement of 2005/06 that the union could be revived again. A year later, in 2007, the union again consisted of fifty members; some members were located within Sudan, while others lived in exile. Altogether it lasted twenty years until the organization was able in 2009 to reopen a settlement in the capital of Sudan. The same year, the union claimed back its building in Khartoum.

In 2007, the Sudanese Writers Union was honored with a Prince Claus Award from the Netherlands. The jury presented the award under the theme Culture and Conflict and praised the work of the union, stating that its members "are working against huge odds to provide a Space of Freedom for debate."

On 29 January 2015, the Sudanese Writers Union was dissolved again and its cultural activities banned by the Ministry of Culture of the government of Omar al-Bashir. At the end of 2016, an administrative court of appeal in Khartoum annulled the Ministry’s decision and ordered the security apparatus to return the Union’s property, as well as to allow them to resume their activities.

== Key figures ==
Sudanese writer, translator, and scholar Ali El-Maak led the Union from its founding in 1985 through 1986. Renowned Sudanese novelist Ibrahim Ishag served as chairperson of the Union starting in 2009, and Ahmed El Safi, a Sudanese anesthesiologist, researcher and writer, was president of the Union in 2017.

Another founding member is Buthaina Khidir Mekki, who was dubbed an "icon of the Sudanese feminist novel" for her narratives about negative social stereotypes towards the education of young girls and the consequences of conflict and war for women.

== See also ==
- Sudanese literature
- List of Sudanese writers
