= Abdul Raheem Glailati =

Sudanese poet, author and newspaper editor

Abdul Raheem Glailati ('Abd al-Rahman Qalilat) was a renowned Sudanese poet, author and newspaper editor. He edited the newspaper Al-Ra'id (The Pioneer) between 1914 and 1917, when he was deported to Egypt after publishing an article describing the low standards of living of the Sudanese people.
