= Malkat al-Dar Muhammad =

Sudanese female writer and women's rights activist

- ملكة الدار محمد عبد الله
- Born: 1920; Sudan
- Died: 17 November 1969 (aged 48–49)
- Occupations: teacher, novelist
- Writing career
- Years active: 1947–1969
- Genre: Arab women's writing
- Notable work: الفراغ العريض (The Wide Void)

Malkat al-Dar Mohamed Abdullah (Arabic: ملكة الدار محمد عبد الله, Sudanese: [ˈmalkat ɘdːˈãr muħamːad ʔbdˈʌlɑ], 1920 – 17 November 1969), also spelled as Malikah ad-Dar, was a Sudanese literary writer, educator and women's rights activist. Her novel written in the 1950s, "Al-Faragh al-'arid" (The Wide Void), has been characterized as the first Sudanese novel in the style of social realism. Sudanese literary critic Lemya Shammat called her "a pioneer of the literary feminist renaissance and a woman of spirit and courage."

== Life and career ==
Malkat al-Dar Mohamed was born in El-Obaid, the capital city of today's federal state of North Kordofan. She completed her early education at the al-Qubba School, the first girls’ school in western Sudan. After completing primary and secondary school, she enrolled in the teachers college in Omdurman in 1943 and served as a teacher after her graduation. She started learning English on her own, making use of correspondence with teachers of English in Sudan. Having taught in several Sudanese cities, she was appointed inspector for education in Kordofan in 1960. She was a founding member of the El-Obaid Women's Charitable Association and she was an active member of the Sudanese Women's Union and the Teacher's Syndicate. Malkat al-Dar Mohamed, whose first name translates as "the queen of the house", died in 1969.

== Critical reception ==
Cover of "The wide void"

Literary critic Eiman El-Nour states that the novel "Al-Faragh al-'arid" (The Wide Void) was the first true example of a Sudanese novel in the style of social realism. The main character, Muna, is an educated woman who teaches and writes for a newspaper and further criticizes her husband for his lack of interest in national politics.

Written in the first half of the 1950s, but published only in 1969, after the death of its author, the story "depicted for the first time the life of a working woman in Sudanese society." In the same article, El-Nour qualifies this novel as romantic and presenting an idyllic image of the Sudanese countryside.

According to literary critic Marcia Lynx Qualey, Malkat al-Dar Mohamed won the first short story contest organized in 1947 by Radio Omdurman for her story about life in a Sudanese village titled “Hakim al-Qariya” or “The Village Sage". Several of her other short stories were published in local and Arab newspapers and magazines. In her stories, women are presented as central characters, questioning traditional sociocultural roles.

Sudanese novelist Buthaina Khidr Makki (born 1948), the author of two novels called Ughniyyat al-nār (The Fire Song) 1998) and Ṣahīl al-nahr (The Whinnying of the River) (2000), said about Malkat al-Dar Mohamed: “She was extremely courageous at a time when people were asking women not to be loud and endure oppression." In his article about Sudanese women's writing, Egyptian writer Mamdouh Farraj al-Nabbi stressed the importance of The Wide Void and called for a new appraisal of this novel. Quoting Sudanese poet and writer Al-Nour Othman Abkar, he describes Malkat ad-Dar's intention "to fulfill the spiritual quest of her heroines where the grip of patriarchy loosens. It is also an unconscious desire for the absence of male authority, which stands in the way of women's development and freedom."

== Works ==
- The Mad Woman
- The Village Sage, 1947
- The Wide Void (in Arabic الفرغ العريض), published posthumously in 1969

== See also ==
- Sudanese literature
- Women in Sudan
