= Abdelaziz Baraka Sakin =

Sudanese fiction writer, born 1963

- عبد العزيز بركة ساكن
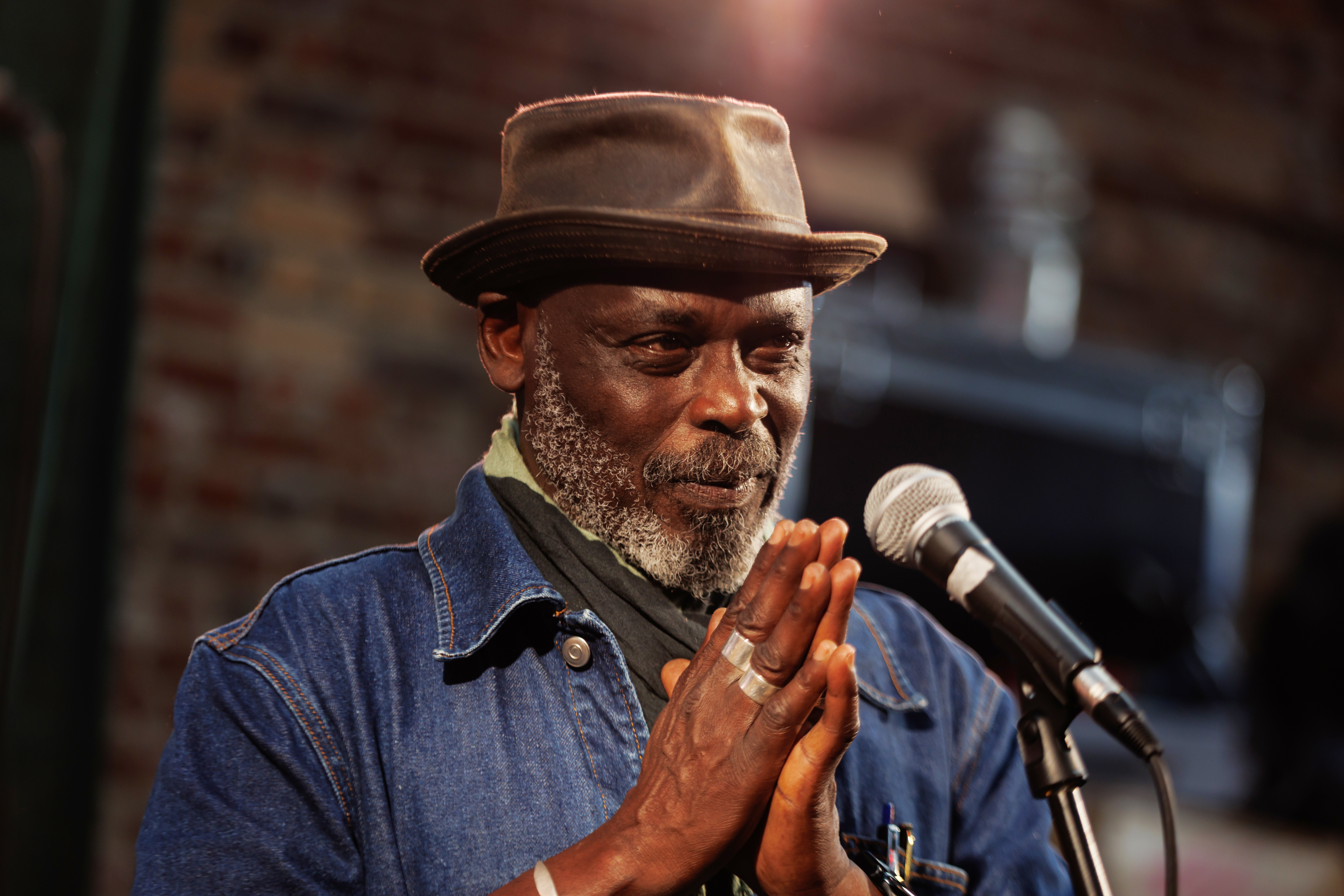
- Born: 1963 (age 62–63); Kassala, Sudan
- Education: BA in Business Administration from University of Assiut, Egypt
- Occupations: Writer, novelist
- Writing career
- Language: Arabic
- Years active: 2000–present
- Notable works: The Messiah of Darfur, novel
- Notable awards: Al-Tayeb Salih Prize for Creative Writing, Prix Les Afriques (2017)

Abdelaziz Baraka Sakin (Arabic:عبد العزيز بركة ساكن, born in Kassala, Sudan, in 1963) is a Sudanese fiction writer with roots in Darfur in western Sudan, whose literary work was banned in Sudan in 2011. Since 2012, he has lived in exile in Austria and later in France. He is mostly known for his novels The Messiah of Darfur and The Jungo, translated from the original Arabic into French, English, Spanish and German.

According to Sudanese literary critic Lemya Shammat, "Sakin has repeatedly reflected on the complexity of human experience during conflict, reflecting the horrible mass of contradictions that war brings.”

== Life and literary career ==
Baraka Sakin was born in the Sudanese town of Kassala near the border with Eritrea, but the roots of his family go back to Darfur in western Sudan. He graduated in business administration from the University of Assiut in Egypt, and has exercised different professional activities during his life: as manual worker, secondary school teacher, consultant for UNICEF in Darfur, or as employee of an international NGO for children's rights.

His literary work, which speaks of marginalised people and war, with references to the Darfur genocide and the dictatorship in Sudan under Omar al-Bashir, is published in Arabic in Egypt. It is popular with Sudanese readers, who had been smuggling his books into their country after their interdiction in 2009. The Sudanese writer Ayman Bik called the novel The Messiah of Darfur "a great step forward, towards liberation from our historical ties with regards to the Darfur region, and regarding the systematic racism and the massacres committed in the region".

In 2011, Baraka Sakin received the Al-Tayeb Salih Prize for Creative Writing at the Khartoum book fair for his novel The Jungo – Stakes of the Earth, which deals with the conditions in a women's prison in El-Gadarif in eastern Sudan. Shortly after its release, the Sudanese authorities confiscated and banned his books. In 2012, Baraka Sakin left Sudan, seeking exile in Austria, where he has lived since 2012.

=== Translations and reception ===
Following the original edition, his novel The Jungo – Stakes of the Earth was published in English and French translations. His short story A Woman from Kampo Kadees was included in the anthology Nouvelles du Soudan in 2010. The French translation of The Messiah of Darfur won the Prix Les Afriques in 2017. In France, he also published a children's book as a multilingual edition in Arabic, English and French.

Several of his short stories were translated into German by Sudanese-Austrian writer Ishraga Mustafa. In September 2016, he was invited to Berlin as participant of the International Festival for Literature, and in 2019 to the festival of African literature Crossing Borders in Cologne, Germany. His novel The Messiah of Darfur was published in a German translation in October 2021. In a review for the German online portal Qantara, fellow writer Volker Kaminski wrote about the novel:

The reader is caught up in the fate of a population trapped in a brutal civil war between government troops and rebels, with huge loss of life and little chance of survival. There are however strong, outstanding individuals who put up a brave, radical fight such as Abdarrahman, a war orphan who gave herself a boy's name.

— Volker Kaminski

Baraka Sakin was awarded the BBC Short Story Prize for the Arab World for A Woman from Kampo Kadees in 1993, and in 2020, the Arab Literature Prize by the Institut du Monde Arabe (IMA) in Paris for the French translation of his novel The Jungo – Stakes of the Earth. Commenting on this award, he said in an interview: "...this prize came at just the right time because my novel talks about religious tolerance, love and humanity, where we now live in a world torn apart by identity struggles, going through what looks like a clash of civilizations.”

Baraka Sakin has written for several Arabic-language magazines: Al Arabi magazine (Kuweit), Al Naqid (London), Nazwa magazine (Oman), Journal of Palestinian Studies (Paris, in French), Doha Magazine (UAE), Banipal (London), or Dastoor newspaper (London).

Violence is carried on the back of the writer … who must write it all down. And in the midst of this storm of violence, there is the struggle for life, a flash of joy and pleasure.

— Abdelaziz Baraka Sakin,

At the end of August 2022, the Austrian city of Graz announced that Baraka Sakin had been nominated for their artist-in-residence award for 2022/23. The jury explained the award with the following words: "In his novels, Abdelaziz Baraka Sakin proves himself to be an astute observer of socioeconomic realities and, last but not least, a convincing analyst of myths and ideologies. The narrator counters the false authenticity of technocratic regimes and abstruse irrationalism with irony, satire and black humour.”

In 2022, his novel La Princesse de Zanzibar (The Princess of Zanzibar) was published in French. An imaginary tale based on selected historical facts, the story talks of the Omani sultanate, slavery and of the 1964 revolution in Zanzibar. Further, it contains numerous details about the oppression of the island's African population as well as the sexual life of the Sultan and was subsequently banned in Oman and Kuwait. In November 2023, this novel was awarded the Prix BaoBaB as the Best African Novel of the year at the Maison d’Afrique Mandingo in Montréal, Canada.

In 2023, Baraka Sakin was decorated Chevalier de l'ordre des Arts et des Lettres (Knight of the Order of Arts and Letters) by the French Ministry of Culture, in recognition of his contributions to literature.

== Selected bibliography ==
(All original Arabic titles given in translation)

Novels

- The Mills, Vision Publishing, Cairo, 2000
- The Water Ashes, Vision Publishing, Cairo, 2001
- The Husband of the Bullet Woman and My Beautiful Daughter, Vision Publishing, Cairo, 2003
- The Bedouin Lover, Vision Publishing, Cairo, 2010
- The Jungo – Stakes of the Earth, Awraq Publishing House, Cairo, 2009
- The Messiah of Darfur, Awraq Publishing House, Cairo, 2012
- The Kandarees, Awraq Publishing House, Cairo, 2012
- Excuse me, Cairo, 2018
- Slavers’ Banquets, 2020
- Prayer of the Flesh, 2020
- Cloning of the Traitor, 2020
- The Princess of Zanzibar, 2024

Short stories

- At the Peripheries of Sidewalks, Awraq Publishing House, Cairo, 2005
- A Woman from Kampo Kadees, Awraq Publishing House, Cairo, 2005
  French translation: Une femme du camp de Kadis, in Nouvelles du Soudan, Magellan & Cie, 2010 English translation in Literary Sudans. An anthology of literature from Sudan and South Sudan, 2016
- The Daily remains of the Night, Awraq Publishing House, Cairo, 2010
- The Music of the Bones, Awraq Publishing House, Cairo, 2011

In English translation

- The Jungo: Stakes of the Earth. (2015). Africa World Press/The Red Sea Press, Inc., Trenton, NJ, USA. ISBN 9781569024249
- The Butcher's Daughter, in The Book of Khartoum, anthology of short stories, Comma Press, UK 2016
- Birth (selected stories), Willows House, Juba, South Sudan, 2020, ISBN 979-8576706129
- "Samahani" (2024), translated by Mayada Ibrahim and Adil Babikir, London: Foundry Editions, ISBN 978-1-7384463-6-0.

In French translation

- Les Jango, Éditions Zulma, Paris, France, 2020, ISBN 978-2-84304-846-3
- Le Messie du Darfour, Éditions Zulma, Paris, France, 2016, ISBN 9782843047794
- La Princesse de Zanzibar, Éditions Zulma, Paris, France, 2022, ISBN 9791038701052.

=== In German translation ===
- Alkchandris: Wer hat Angst vor Osman Bushra? (short story) 2012
- Der Messias von Darfur, Edition Orient, Berlin, 2021
- "Der Rabe, der mich liebte", Klingenberg, 2025, Aus dem Arabischen von Larissa Bender

In Spanish translation

- El Mesías de Darfur, Armænia
- "El héroe cuyos sueños se elevaron como un dron" COMARES Editorial. 2025, Traducción de Rafael Ortega Rodrigo

=== Awards and distinctions ===
- 2011 Al-Tayeb-Salih Award for Creative Writing, Sudan
- 2013 Stories on Air Prize, awarded by the BBC and Al Arabi Magazine
- 2016 Prix du Live d’Humour de Resistance, awarded by La Maison du Rire et de l'Humour de Cluny, France
- 2017 Prix Les Afriques, La Cène Littéraire, Switzerland
- 2017 Prix Littérature-Monde, Academie française de Développement, France
- 2020 Prix de la littérature arabe (Award for Arabic literature), Institut du monde arabe and Jean-Luc Lagardère Foundation, France
- 2022/23 Town writer residency, Graz, Austria
- 2023 Knight of the Order of Arts and Letters by the French Ministry of Culture
- 2023 Prix BaoBaB, Ivory Coast

== See also ==
- Sudanese literature
- List of Sudanese writers
- Modern Arabic literature
