= Balconies (book series) =

Book by Ibrahim Nasrallah

Balconies (Book Series)
- Author: Ibrahim Nasrallah
- Language: Arabic
- Genre: Literary fiction
- Published: 2005-2014
- Publisher: Arabic Scientific Publishers
- Pages: 1230

Balconies is a literary project by the Palestinian novelist and poet Ibrahim Nasrallah. The project parallels his Palestinian comedy. So far, the project consists of five novels, each novel standing on its own. Some of the novels were translated into English, and some of the novels were longlisted for the International Prize for Arabic Fiction, also known as the “Poker” prize.

== Books in The Series Chronologically ==
- Balcony of Delirium, 2005. It was translated into English.
- Balcony of Snow Man, 2009.
- Balcony of Disgrace, 2010.
- Balcony of Abyss, 2013. It was longlisted for the International Prize for Arabic Fiction in 2014.
- Balcony of Paradise, 2014.

== About The Series ==
Contrary to Nasrallah's ‘Palestinian Comedy’, “Balconies” is a literary project whose goal is to establish realistic examples. Ibrahim Nasrallah was prepared to recreate absurdism once more when the first novel in the series – Balcony of Delirium – was published. Moreover, Nasrallah provides endless suggestions– in this series and in his other novels – related to the structure of the novel. He also dives into the world of Arabs with depth and boldness.

Dr. Muhammad Abdul Kadir says that whilst Nasrallah's “Palestinian Comedy” projects records the Palestinian experience in all its stages. “Balconies” records the Arab experience in all its nauseating troubles. Whilst the tragic-comic aspect is what sets his comedy apart, the surreal, fantastic, and absurdist aspects are what set his “Balconies” series apart.

Ibrahim Nasrallah's statements about his own series:

Ibrahim Nasrallah stated that “Balconies” is the other face to his “Palestinian Comedy,” adding that the latter would be incomplete without the former. He also said that “Balconies” aids in viewing the Arab reality whose fascism resides humanely and politically, and only results in more loss. He adds that this is the specter of “Balconies,” it is his way of observing the constant political and social destruction of Arabs, reaching a point where Arabs become their own punisher.

On more than one occasion, Nasrallah said that before finishing his novel “Time of White Horses,” he found himself deeply immersed in a completely different literary project, and that project is “Balcony of Delirium.” He felt that it was the beginning to another literary project – next to his Palestinian Comedy – known as “Balconies.” It became clear to him that understanding the Palestinian Cause is impossible without understanding the Arab Cause as well. Therefore, to him, this project is the other side to his Palestinian Comedy, comparing the two projects as two banks to a river.

He also expressed his concerns and worries over the current situations in Arab countries, adding that they are caused by faux or fascist democracies whose only job is to kill freedom. Additionally, he said that ballot boxes become spears for the body, mind, heart, soul, hope, and future. He was obsessed with finding a new writing style and was constantly searching for new beginnings. In summary, each one of us has their own balcony in the Arab world, and who doesn't have a physical balcony, they surely have a spiritual one.
