= Sdot =

Sdot (Hebrew: שְׂדוֹת), a Hebrew word meaning fields, may refer to the following places in Israel:

- Sdot Micha
- Sdot Negev Regional Council
- Sdot Yam

Sdot may also refer to:

- Dot operator, a type of Interpunct
