= Hassan El Mouden =

- حسن المودن
- Born: May 17, 1963 (age 63); Essaouira, Morocco
- Known for: Psychoanalytic criticism of literature
- Awards: Katara Prize for Arabic Novel (2016)

Academic background
- Education: Cadi Ayyad University (BA, PhD); Mohammed V University (Postgraduate diploma, DAS)
- Thesis: Persuasive Discourse in Arabic Rhetoric (2006)

Academic work
- Discipline: Literary criticism; Translation; Psychoanalysis

Hassan El Mouden (Arabic: حسن المودن; born May 17, 1963, in Essaouira) is a Moroccan academic, critic, and translator. His work focuses on the psychoanalysis of literature.

== Life and education ==
He was born on May 17, 1963, in the city of Essaouira, southern Morocco. He obtained a postgraduate diploma in literature from the Faculty of Arts at Mohammed V University in Rabat in 1996, followed by a diploma of advanced studies in methodologies from the same faculty in 1990, and a bachelor's degree in Arabic literature from the Faculty of Arts at Cadi Ayyad University in Marrakech in 1986. In 2006, he earned a doctorate in Criticism and Rhetoric from the Faculty of Arts at Cadi Ayyad University in Marrakech for his thesis titled: "Persuasive Discourse in Arabic Rhetoric."

He has published several studies and translations, and his work has appeared in numerous Moroccan and Arab newspapers and magazines. He has also participated in many literary and cultural forums.

== Awards ==
His study, "The Arabic Novel: From the Family Novel to the Narrative of Family Affiliation, a Critical Reading from a Psychoanalytic Perspective," won the Katara Prize for Arabic Novel in 2016 in the category of Critical Studies.
