= Najat Abdul Samad =

Syrian contemporary fiction writer

- نجاة عبد الصمد
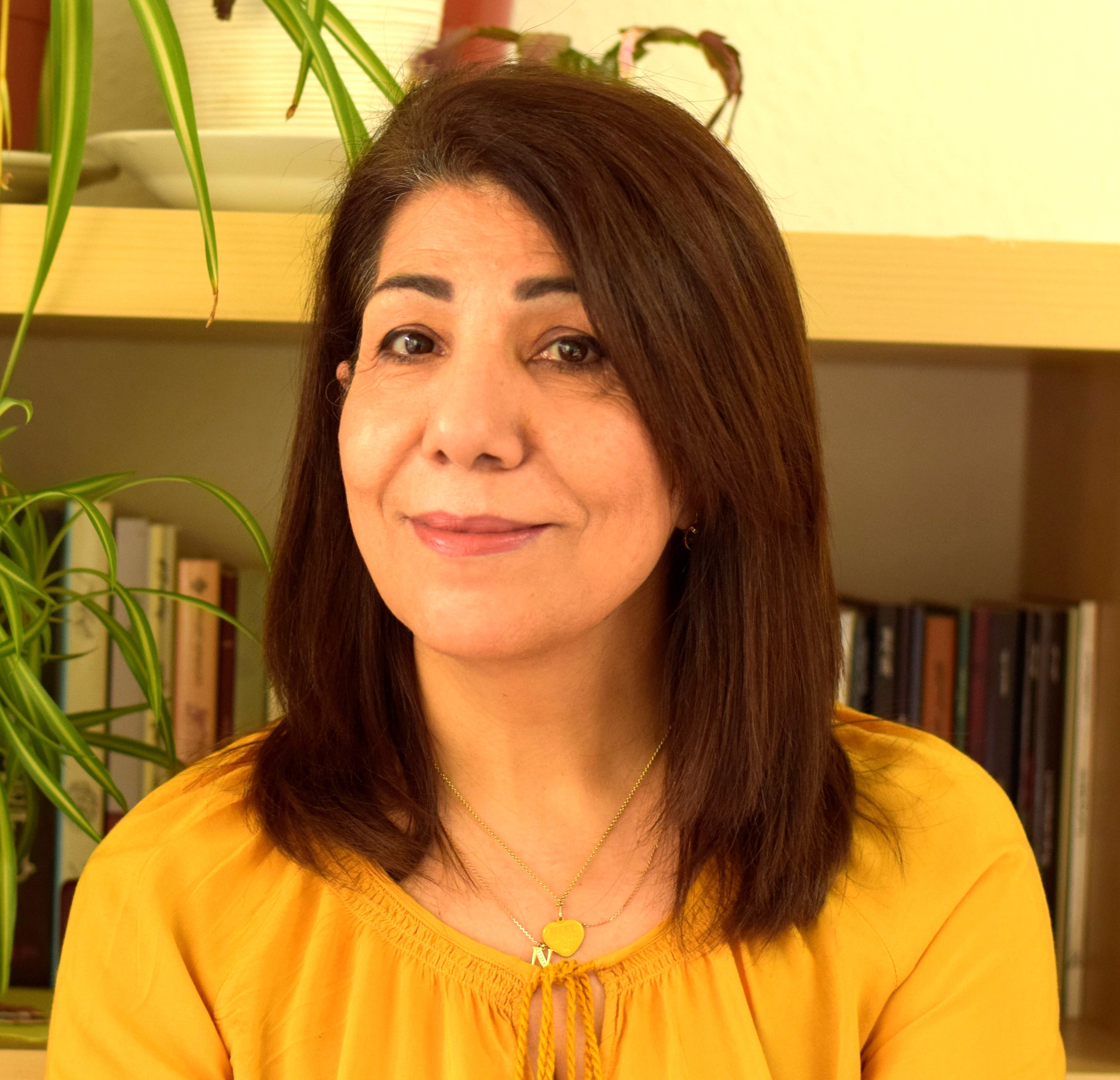
- Born: 1967 (age 58–59); As-Suwayda, Syria
- Education: Damascus University
- Occupations: writer, gynecologist
- Writing career
- Language: Arabic
- Period: 2010-present
- Genres: novels, short stories, poetry
- Notable awards: Katara Prize for Arabic Novel, 2018

Najat Abdul Samad, alternative spelling Najat Abed Alsamad, (Arabic: نجاة عبد الصمد, romanized: Najāt ʻAbd al-Ṣamad, born 1967, As-Suwayda, Syria), is a Syrian fiction writer, poet and gynecologist. She has published several novels, including La Ma' Yarweeha (No Water to quench their Thirst), winner of the 2018 Katara Prize for the Arabic Novel, published in a German translation. She currently lives in Berlin, Germany.

== Education and career ==
Abdul Samad was born in As-Suwayda, Syria, in 1967 as part of the local Druze community. After her medical training as a gynecologist and obstetrician at the University of Zaporizhzhia in Ukraine and working in this profession for several years, she obtained a degree in Arabic Language and Literature from Damascus University.

In a 2017 interview, she spoke of having met women in her clinic who had lost everything, who needed understanding, help, guidance and treatment, and that many of them had suffered from more than one form of violence and assaults. Further, she had witnessed many grave injuries of hospital patients in Deraa at the beginning of the Syrian uprising after the Syrian army had assaulted that town.

Her first novel Bilad al-Manafi (Lands of Exile) was published in 2010. This story deals with the frustrations that young refugees face when they have lost their jobs back home and then have to accept any kind of employment in exile. In her collection of short stories titled Syrian Guernicas, named after the historical destruction of the Basque town of Guernica, she recounted the consequences of the war affecting families, with men either absent as fighters, maimed or killed, and how the burden of the family and all its responsibilities and economic burden fell on women. Her next collection, In the Tenderness of War, comprises stories of people Abdul Samad met as a gynecologist and humanitarian volunteer in her native region. According to translator Anam Zafar, the author wanted to represent "the humans behind the headlines", and published her "descriptions of violence and trauma, alongside frank, absolutely un-flowery dialogue".

Her novels Lands of Exile and No Water to quench their Thirst are stories based on the political and social nature of the province of As-Suwayda. This region is presented as barren and rugged, with water being scarce, and people's relations having become dismantled. Since Ottoman times, and throughout its modern history, it has been suffering from uprisings, chaos and fighting, as Abdul Samad explained.

In 2018, her novel La Ma' Yarweeha won the Katara Prize for Arabic Novels in the category of published Arab novels. In 2023, it was also translated into German as Kein Wasser stillt ihren Durst. - Telling the story from the perspective of a woman, who rebels against social traditions and is punished by being locked in the basement of her parents' house, the author drew inspiration from the customs, traditions and myths of the Druze community in As-Suwayda. Passages from the oral narrative tradition preceding the book's chapters further provide insight into the lives of women, who are suffering from their lifestyles shaped by men. In 2022, she published her third novel, The Pendulum Thread. Apart from the narrative story, this novel also addresses the role of responsibility and care in a society.

Apart from writing her own works, Abdul Samad has co-translated the short story A Young Doctor's Notebook by the Russian writer Mikhail Bulgakov from Russian into Arabic.

== Critical reception ==
Excerpts of Abdul Samad’s writing, translated by fellow Syrian Ghada Alatrash, Assistant Professor at Alberta University of the Arts, Canada, have appeared in the Los Angeles Times, and literary discussions of her work have been aired in the United States on Public Radio International and Studio 360.

In a January 2016 article, PBS NewsHour called Abdul Samad’s writing "poetic and rich in imagery", presenting " the urgency of life in Syria and the struggle of families to maintain stability under the threat of war."

In her 2020 scholarly article "On Understanding Syrian Diasporic Identities through a Selection of Syrian Literary Works", Ghada Alatrash discussed the notions of war and displacement within the Syrian diaspora as described by Abdul Samad in articles she wrote for the Lebanese news media An-Nahar. According to Alatrash these articles provide an "insight that [...] evokes an empathetic understanding, one that could not be delivered by any other lens but that of those living the Diasporic experience."

In the dedication for her 2020 book Imagining Justice for Syria, American lawyer and diplomat Beth Van Schaack quoted Abdul Samad's poem When I Am Overcome by Weakness. The same poem was quoted at Al Jazeera in an article about new poems from Syria using "literal, visceral descriptions, with a newfound emphasis on a united Syrian identity instead of religious symbols."

In June 2021, literary translator Sawad Hussain, writing for the British Council, recommended the short story collection In The Tenderness of War for future translation. She called it a testimony "to see the humans behind the headlines", written also as a "personal therapy."

In his review of No Water to quench their Thirst, German writer Volker Kaminski remarked that it was not easy to follow the narrator in her "expansive fable and the many flashbacks". Overall, however, he saw the book as "a grandiose, highly literary novel." In their spring 2024 list of the seven best recently translated works into German, the literary organization LitProm recommended it along with six other works of world literature.

== Selected works ==
- Bilad Al Manafi (Lands of Exile), novel, Dar al-Rayyis 2010
- Ghornikat Suria (Syrian Guernicas), short stories, 2013
- Fi Hananya Al Harb (In the Tenderness of War), short stories, Madarek Publishing House 2015
- La Ma' Yarweeha (No Water to quench their Thirst), novel, 2016
- Manazel al-Awtan (Home of Nations), Bayt al-Muwaten al-Souri, Beirut 2018
- Khayṭ al-bandūl (The Pendulum Thread), novel, Dar Nofal, Beirut, 2022

== Awards and distinctions ==
- 2018: La Ma' Yarweena won the Katara Prize for Arabic Novels in the category of published novels
- 2021: Translation Prize in Fiction
- 2024: LitProm list of best recently translated works for the German translation of the same novel

== See also ==
- Syrian literature

== Literature ==
- Alatrash, Ghada; Abed Alsamad, Najat (2020). "On Understanding Syrian Diasporic Identities through a Selection of Syrian Literary Works". Journal of Contemporary Issues in Education. 15 (2): 3–22. doi:10.20355/jcie29373.
- Alatrash, Ghada (2016). Stripped to the Bone: Portraits of Syrian Women (Women of Syria). Petra Books. pp. 27–28. ISBN 978-1-927032-46-6.
- Abed Alsamad, Najat (2016). If (G. Alatrash, Trans.). In E. Strang, N. Hunt, & C. Chapman (eds.), Dark mountain (10th ed.). Padstow, United Kingdom: The Dark Mountain Project.
