= Katara Prize for Arabic Novel =

Literary award for Arabic novels

- Country: Qatar
- Presented by: Katara Cultural Village
- First award: 2015
- Website: Katara Prize for Arabic Novel

The Katara Prize for Arabic Novel is an Arabic literary prize based in Qatar. It was established in 2014 by the Doha-based Katara Cultural Village. The total prize pool is $650,000 and the main prize $200,000, making it one of the richest literary prizes in the world. One of its sponsors is UNESCO. The winning novels will be translated into five languages - including French and English.

The prize was originally split into two major categories: published and unpublished novels each of which had five winners. More recently, prizes were added for research/literary critique and for young adult unpublished novels. For the published novels, the five winners originally received $60,000 while five winners in the unpublished category were each awarded $30,000. Among the winners in each category, one was chosen as the "drama" winner in which the winning works are guaranteed film adaptations. The drama winner in the published category received an additional $200,000.

In addition to the original award for Arabic novels, separate awards have been given for Arabic short stories and poetry.

== Winners ==
- winner of the drama prize

=== 2015 ===
Published

- Amir Tag El Sir, 366 (Sudan)
- Ibrahim Abdel-Meguid, Adagio (Egypt)
- Muneera Sawar, Ongoing (Bahrain)
- Nasira Al Sadoun, Escaping the Vortex (Iraq)
- Waciny Laredj, Butterfly Kingdom (Algeria)

Unpublished

- Jalal Barjas (Jordan)
- Abdul Jaleel Al Tuhami (Morocco)
- Maisaloon Hadi (Iraq)
- Zakaria Abu Maria (Morocco)
- Samih Al Ghabbas (Egypt)

=== 2016 ===
- Salmi Nasser, Blue Tongues (ISBN 9789927126185)
- Ali Al Refaei, Mero Family Genes (ISBN 9789927126192)
- Mustapha El Hamdaoui, Princess Shadow (ISBN 9789927126178)
- Saad Mohammed Raheem, Shadows of a Body (ISBN 9789927126314)
- Nasser Iraq, Al-Azbakia (ISBN 9789927126338)

=== 2017 ===
Prize for Published Novel - $60,000 each

- Said Khatibi, Forty Years Awaiting Isabel
- Sameha Kheres, Fostoq Abeed
- Shaker Noori, Khatoon Baghdad
- Hoshank Osi, The Plight of the Questions and the Lust of Imagination
- Mohamed Barada, Mawt Mokhtalif

Prize for Unpublished Novel - $30,000 each

- Husein Al-Sakaf, False Face Statue
- Taha Mohamed Taha, The Apple Tree
- Abdelwahab Eisawi, Safar Amal Al-Manseyen
- Mohamed Al-Meer Ghalib, Shahd Al-Maqaber
- Mona Al-Shimi, Watan Al-Jeeb Al-Khalfi

Research-Literary Criticism - $10,000 each

- Dr. Al-Basheer Dayfallah
- Dr. Khalid Ali Al-Yas
- Dr. Abdelhamid Al-Hossami
- Dr. Mostafa Al-Nahal
- Dr. Youssef Youssef

Prize for Young Adult Unpublished Novels - $10,000 each

- Ahmad Shehata, Jabal Al-Khorafat
- Ghamar Mahmoud, Babel's Mirror
- Kauther Al-Gondi, Seren's Notebook
- Moneera Al-Darwai, It is not a Condition to be a Superhero to Succeed
- Nasr Sami, Al-Taer Al-Bashari

=== 2018 ===
Prize for a published novel - $60,000 each

- Ibrahim Ahmed Ibrahim Ahmed, Barry Ansouda Sudan
- Omar Ahmed Fadlallah, Breaths
- Thawrah Hawamidah, A Paradise That Did Not Drop Its Apple
- Qassim Mohammed Tawfiq, The Little Bird Bled
- Najat Abdul Samad, No Water to quench their Thirst

Prize for an unpublished novel- $30.000 each

- Haya Saleh, Another Color of the Sunset
- Abdulkareem Al Obaidi, The American Beard
- Hassan Baeti, Temporary Faces
- Thaera Akrabawi, Hajar
- Zakaria Abdel-Gawad, Neigh Astray

=== 2019 ===
Prize for a published novel - $60,000 each

- Laila Al-Atrash, Not Like Herself
- Majdi Daibes, The burden of guilt
- Habib Sayah, Haim & I
- Haji Jaber, Black Foam
- Habib Abdulrab Sarori, Revelation

Prize for an unpublished novel - $30.000 each

- Warid Bader Al-salim, The Kidnapped
- Salemi Nasser, A Cup of Coffee and a Croissant
- Abdelmomen Ahmed AbdelAal, At The Gates of El-Mahrousa
- Wafa Alloush, Haystack
- Aicha Ammor, A life in black and white

=== 2020 ===
Prize for a published novel - $60,000 each

- Ibrahim Nasrallah, A Tank Under the Christmas Tree
- Mohamed Makhzangi, The reservist
- Fatin al-Murr, Dust 1918
- Cheikh Elbane, Wood Valley
- Fathia Debech, Melanin

Prize for an unpublished novel - $30.000 each

- Ghazi Hussein Al-Ali, The Unmistakable Black Mercedes
- Najib Nasr, Half A Human
- Lazhar Zanned, The Watchman: An Eye on Place and the Other on Time
- Dr. Saied Al-Allam, The Maiden of Granada Love Between Two Cities: Granada and Chefchaouen
- Salem Mahmoud Salem, Happened in Alexandria

=== 2021 ===
Prize for a published novel - $60,000 each

- Habib Selmi
- Ahmed Al Qarmlawi
- Fajr Yaqoub
- Ayman Rajab Taher
- Nader Manhal Haj Omar

Prize for an unpublished novel - $30.000 each

- Etidal Najeeb Al Shoufi from Syria
- Ghid Al Ghareb from Iraq
- Younis Ali from Morocco
- Muhammad Abdullah Al Hadi from Egypt
- Walid bin Ahmed from Tunisia.

Prize for the studies category concerned with research and fiction criticism - $15,000 each

- Ahmed Adel Al Qadabi from Egypt
- Reda Jawadi from Tunisia
- Muhammad Al Dahi from Morocco
- Mamdouh Farraj Al Nabi from Egypt
- Yahya bin Al Walid from Morocco.

Prize for Young Adults category - $10,000 each

- Al Hanouf Muhammad Al Wahaimed from Saudi Arabia
- Faisal Muhammad Abdullah Al Ansari from Qatar
- Dr. Omar Sofi Mohamed from Egypt
- Magdy Younes from Egypt
- Munira Al Darawi from Tunisia

Prize for the published Qatari novel

- Shamma Shaheen Al Kuwari

=== 2024 ===
Prize for a published novel - $30,000 each

- Alaa Halihal from Palestine for Seven Letters to Umm Kulthum
- Mohamed Tarzi from Lebanon for A Silenced Microphone
- Youssef Hussein from Egypt for Pawns and Medals

Prize for an unpublished novel - $30.000 each

- Kouider Maimoni from Algeria for El Camino de la Muerte
- Liza Khaddar from Syria for The Wall of Shame
- Yassine Genni from Morocco for Absurdity

Prize for an unpublished historical novel,

- Dhyaa Jubaili from Iraq for The Duri Narrative in What Al-Tabari Didn’t Mention – The Zanj Rebellion

Prize for the studies category of research and fiction criticism - $30,000 each

- Belkacem Aissani from Algeria for his study The Narrative Thought
- Bouchaib Sawari from Morocco for Imagining Identity in the Arabic Novel
- Hashim Mirghani from Sudan for The Novel as a Stage for Identity Debates and its Reconstruction

Prize for Young Adults category - $15,000 each

- Aboubakr Hammadi from Algeria for My Name is Libra
- Shaimaa Ali Gamal Eldin from Egypt for Reema’s House
- Alaa Al-Jaber from Iraq for The Land of Oranges and Olives

Prize for the published Qatari novel

- Kulthum Jaber Al-Kuwari for her novel Bin Dirham’s Neighborhood
