= Muneera Swar =

Bahraini novelist

Muneera Swar (Arabic: منيرة سوار; born 1975) is a Bahraini novelist and translator. Her book Jariya was a winner of the Katara Prize for Arabic Novel in 2015.

== Biography ==
Muneera Swar was born in Bahrain in 1975. Her father is the Bahraini writer Aqil Sawar. She attended the University of Bahrain, where she studied English literature.

In 2006, Swar published a popular translation into Arabic of Jo Frost's book Supernanny. The following year she began writing fiction, and she published her first novel, Nisa’a al Mutaa, in 2008.

Her second novel, Hussein Al-Messenger, was released in 2012. Then, in 2014 she published her third novel, Jariya, which deals with race and identity in the Arab world. The following year, it was chosen as one of the winners of the inaugural Katara Prize for Arabic Novel, the only Bahraini work honored that year. Jariya was published in French translation as Courtisane in 2016.

In addition to her writing, Swar has worked as a graphic designer and in the Public Relations and Media Department of the Bahraini Ministry of Education.

== Awards ==
- 2015, Katara Prize for Arabic Novel
