= Samih Al Ghabbas =

Egyptian physician and novelist

- Born: 11 January 1974 (age 52); Egypt
- Occupations: physician, writer, novelist
- Years active: 2006–present

Samih Al Gabbas (Arabic: سامح الجباس; born 11 January 1974) is an Egyptian physician and writer. He has many publications, including the novel "An Old Rope and a Tied Knot", which won the Katara Prize for Arabic Novel in the category of unpublished novels and in the Drama category in 2015. He has also translated several books from English into Arabic including John Steinbeck’s novella "Of Mice and Men".

== Education and career ==
Samih Al Gabbas, an Egyptian physician and writer, born on 11 January 1974. His literary career began in 2006, when he published his first collection of short stories titled "The Ideal Citizen". In the same year, he published his first novel "Hayy El Franj". He has published so far, one short stories collections, and ten novels. Al Gabbas has also translated several novels from English into Arabic including "Of Mice and Men" by John Steinbeck and "Alice in the Wonderland" by Lewis Carroll. He has won several awards for his literary works, including the proze for the best novel from the Writers Association in Cairo for his novel "The Franj District", and won the Katara Prize for Arabic Novel for his novel "An Old Rope and Tied Knot" in 2015, and his novel has been translated into English and French. Al Gabbas worked as a director of advertising and marketing in pharmaceutical companies from 1999 until 2013. He is now a member of the story club in Cairo, and a member of the Egyptian Writers Union.

== Awards ==
- 2009: First place for the best novel from the Writers Association of Cairo for his novel "The Franj District".
- 2011: First place in the Arab Journal of Writing competition for children for his novel "Sea of Storms".
- 2011: Received a grant from the Arab Fund for Arts and Culture in Literature for his novel "Port Said" in 2011.
- 2011: First place in the Ihsan Abdel Quddous Prize in the novel for his novel "Cairo’s Christmas".
- 2012: Won the novel prize of "Al Jomhuria Al Kubra" newspaper competition.
- 2013: Won the Egyptian Writers Union Prize for novels for his novel "Port Said".
- 2015: Won the Katara Prize for Arabic Novel for his novel "An Old Rope and a Tied Knot" in the category of unpublished novels.
- 2015: Won the Katara Prize for Arabic Novel in the Drama Category for his novel "An Old Rope and a Tied Knot".
