= Ebola '76 =

2012 novel by Amir Taj al-Sir

Ebola ‘76
- First edition cover, Arabic
- Author: Amir Taj al-Sir
- Original title: إيبولا 76
- Translator: Charis Bredin, Emily Danby
- Language: Arabic
- Publisher: دار الساقي, Darf Publishers
- Publication date: 2012
- English publication date: 2015
- Media type: Print
- Pages: 134 pages
- ISBN: 9781850772743 English first edition
- OCLC: 908925929

Ebola ‘76 (Arabic: إيبولا 76) is a 2012 novel written by Sudanese author and medical doctor Amir Taj al-Sir. Originally written in Arabic, the novel recounts the 1976 Ebola outbreak in Sudan.

== Plot ==
On a hot, humid August day in 1976, The Democratic Republic of Congo is the setting of the first major Ebola outbreak. Unfortunately, the outbreak is difficult to contain and control due to the squalid living conditions as a result of deep poverty, and the population's ignorance and apathy regarding the virus. These 2 factors help the Ebola strain to fester and spread to an epidemic affecting the city Kinshasa heavily. As luck would have it, an ordinary Sudanese factory worker by the name Lewis, who happened to stop through Kinshasa on his way back to his home, contracted the virus from an escort during an adulterous romp and consequently brought it back to his home in Nzara to subsequently spread. The novel goes on and shows Ebola's path of destruction in Nzara through Lewis' social connections and its devastating effect on the town as a whole.

== Main characters ==
- Lewis Nawa: Lewis is a factory worker who is in a loveless marriage with his wife Tina. He engages in many affairs, and is responsible for bringing the deadly Ebola virus to his hometown of Nzara in the south of Sudan. He is one of the few to survive the virus.
- Elaine: Elaine was Lewis’s mistress and a chambermaid from Kinshasa, Congo that is the first character specified to die from Ebola. Lewis made regular visits to see her and was devastated by her sudden death. Elaine contracted the virus from another man she was sleeping with.
- Jamandi Ahmed: Jamandi is a magician declining in popularity that performs on the streets every day for money. Jamandi has been around so long that the street her performs on is unofficially named after him.
- Kanini: Kanini is an abused, young girl born in the stable outside Kinshasa. Desperate for money, she engages in relations with Lewis and unknowingly infects him with the Ebola virus.
- Ruwadi Monti (“The Needle”): Ruwadi is a famous blind guitar player that performs concerts around Africa. Upon his arrival to Nzara, the Ebola outbreak is exponentially growing.
- Darina: Darina is a youthful, pretty girl in her twenties that acts as Ruwadi’s “personal walking stick”.
- Anami Okiyano: Originally from Kenya but a long time Nzara resident, Anami is a single man in his sixties and the creator behind the Man of the Year award. Anami also works in the factory owned by James Riyyak with Lewis.
- James Riyyak: Riyyak is a former ex-rebel and the owner of the factory and Nzara. He is hated by all of his workers and has a cruel, brutish, and greedy reputation around the region.
- Tina Azacouri: Restricted by societal roles, Tina is thirty-seven year old woman trapped in her lifeless marriage with her husband Lewis. She spends her time selling water on the streets with her mother. The only hope she has in her marriage is to have a child before it is too late.

== Critical reception ==
Critical reception for Ebola '76 was mostly positive and the novel also received positive reader responses. The Guardian was mixed in their review, stating that "Like a medieval danse macabre, Ebola leads a parade of wretches to the grave, but Tag Elsir’s apparent disdain for his characters robs his narrative of empathy and leaves the reader indifferent to the fate of Lewis, the blind guitarist Ruwadi, the washed‑up magician Jamadi and the rest." Asymptote was more favorable, writing that "Though it is a quick fictional account, Ebola ’76 is an educational read about the emergence of the Ebola virus and how it could have possibly spread from the DRC to South Sudan." Reviewing for the American Historical Association, Shatha Almutawa felt that "Despite the gravity of the subject of the novel, the language is witty and the mood light-seeing the world from the perspective of the virus, after all, is very different from seeing it from the perspective of grief-stricken men who lost their lovers."

== See also ==
- Ebola virus
- The Hot Zone
