= Gaza Weddings =

2004 novel by Ibrahim Nasrallah

- Author: Ibrahim Nasrallah
- Translator: Nancy Roberts
- Language: Arabic
- Genre: Novel
- Publisher: Arab Scientific Publishers
- Publication date: 2004
- Publication place: Palestine
- Pages: 144 pp (paperback)
- ISBN: 9953876258
- Preceded by: –

Gaza Weddings (Arabic: أعراس آمنة) is a 2004 novel published by Ibrahim Nasrallah. It is one of the eight novels in the Palestinian Comedy series, which explores the Palestinian cause. The novel is written alternately Modern Standard Arabic and the Palestinian dialect.
