= Sdot Micha Airbase =

Israeli Air Force missile base and depot

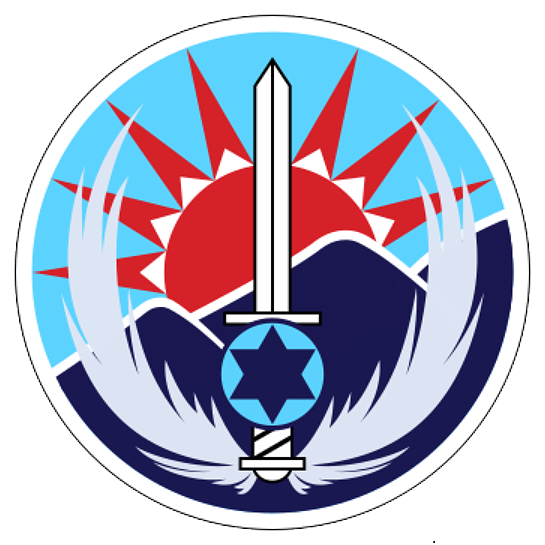
Sdot Micha Israeli Air Force Base Air Wing 2
- שדות מיכה
- Sdot Micha, Jerusalem District in Israel
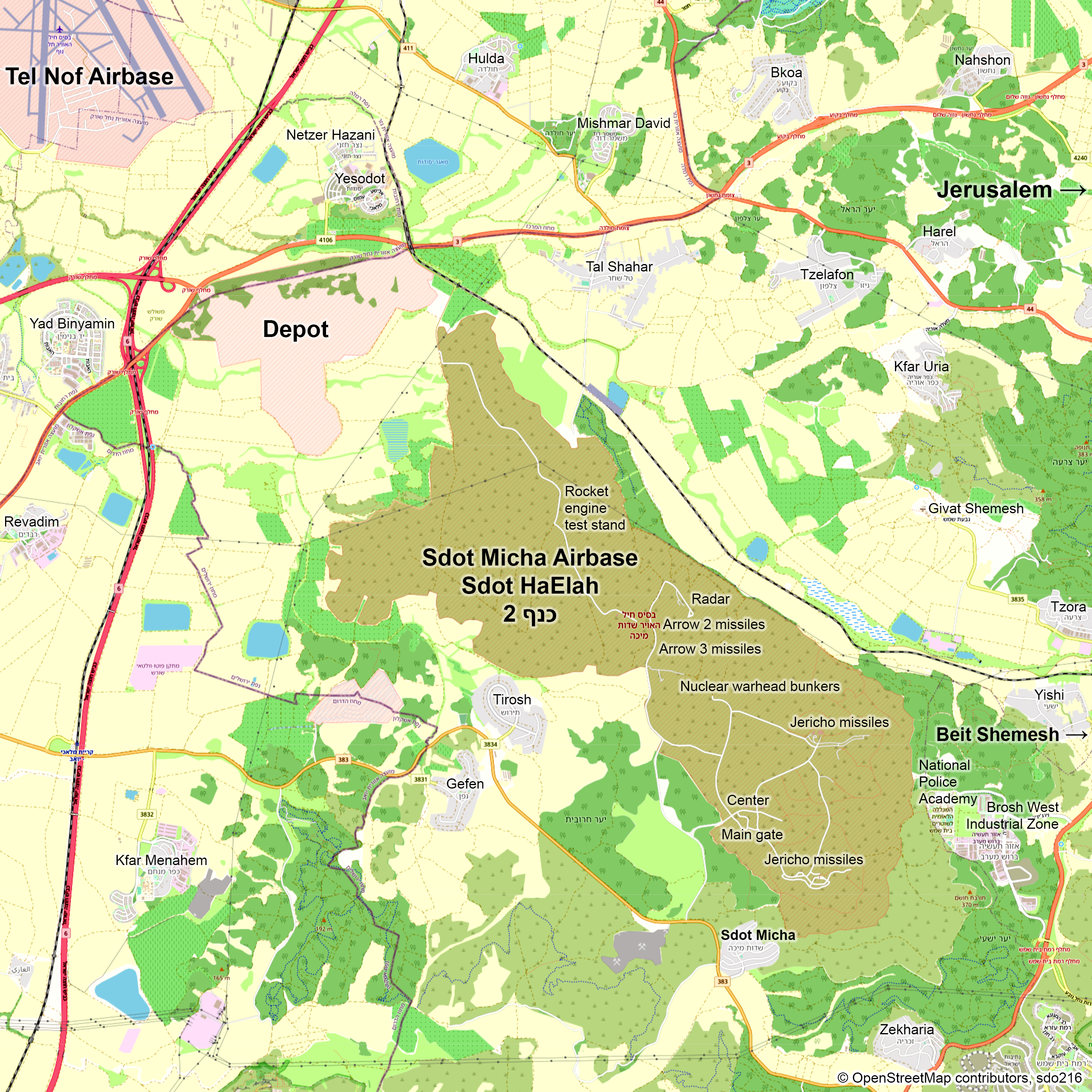

Site information
- Type: Military missile base
- Owner: Israel Defense Forces
- Operator: Israeli Air Force

Location
- Shown within Israel Sdot Micha Airbase (Israel)
- Coordinates: 31°44′19″N 34°55′10″E

Site history
- Built: 1962
- In use: 1962 – present

Sdot Micha Airbase (in Hebrew: שדות מיכה, lit. Micha Fields, also called Sdot HaElah Airbase by the IDF) is an Israeli Air Force (IAF) missile base and depot, whose existence Israel neither confirms nor denies. It is situated in the center of Israel, halfway from Jerusalem to the Mediterranean Sea and extends nearly 13 km from southeast to northwest. The center of the base is located 1.5 km north of moshav Sdot Micha and it has neither a runway nor a visible heliport. Its facilities can now be clearly seen on satellite images. Nuclear warheads are supposed to be stored at the base, that can be fired from Jericho mobile missiles stationed in caverns there. In addition, Arrow interceptor missiles are stationed at the base.

== Name ==
The secret airbase has been called many names. It is most commonly called by sources as Sdot Micha Airbase due to its proximity to moshav Sdot Micha, and less commonly Tirosh or Zekharia Airbase (including different spelling), due to other nearby moshavs of these names or Kanaf 2 Airbase (lit. Wing 2 Airbase).

In July 2017 the IDF temporarily uncovered the name of the airforce's 11th and secret base called Sdot HaElah, but after the press had picked it up, it disappeared again from their website. The moshav Sdot Micha is located in the Valley of Elah, (עמק האלה Emek HaElah in Hebrew), 4 km northwest of where David and Goliath are believed to have fought. The stream Elah (Nahal HaElah) runs south of the moshav but is dry for most of the year.

A 2005 official Israeli document regarding the Privatization of the Military Industry of Israel Ltd. later renamed IMI Systems (Resolution no. M'Kh/24 of the Ministerial Committee on Privatization Affairs dated 28.08.2005) states: "IMI's rights in part of the land division known as "Area 209" designated for the "Arrow" battery were sold by IMI to the Ministry of Defense under an agreement dated May 10, 2005." In the official documents published at the time of the sale of IMI Systems to Elbit Systems (Resolution No. M'Kh/2 of the Ministerial Committee on Privatization of 23.12.2013) the base is referred to again as Area 209 (in Hebrew שטח אש 209). The restricted airspace and restricted military area covers an area of 12,550 dunams in the Mateh Yehuda Regional Council, and was allocated to the Ministry of Defense by the Israel Land Authority.

== Missiles ==
=== Jericho ===
It is believed that the base is a missile launch facility for nuclear-tipped Jericho 2 IRBMs and probably Jericho 3 ICBMs. Satellite images show launch areas for mobile missiles very explicitly, which is part of their deterrence. In the mid-2020s, the development of a new version called Jericho 4, which is supposed to contain multiple warheads, also appears to be very far advanced.

The roads for the mobile missile systems are in between ridges of hills, which has the advantage that the missile bunkers could be dug into the limestone hills around and only need massive doors to protect them from nuclear explosions – direct hits excluded. The missile sites are also hidden there and cannot to be seen from the outside.

Newer and sharper satellite images indicate that there are two gates and two so-called launchers per caverns. The northern area has 14 of these caverns and the southern area has 9, which offers space for a maximum of 46 launchers. About one and a half kilometers northwest of these positions, there is also a fenced and additionally secured area with four bunkers within the base, probably a storage facility for nuclear warheads.

=== Arrow ===
In 2012, an Arrow 2 missile battery – the third in Israel alongside Palmachim and Ein Shemer – has been deployed there, near the moshav Tal Shahar. The Arrow system was developed jointly by Israel and the US in the 1990s and can shoot down incoming nuclear missiles at high altitudes. For target detection and tracking, it uses the Super Green Pine Radar installed on Ein Shemer with a range of 1,000 kilometers. The Arrow system is operated by the Israeli Air Defense Command, a division of the IAF.

According to Jane's Defence Weekly, Sdot Micha is also a location for the new Arrow 3 ABM, deployed there in the beginning of 2017. Satellite photos show four rectangular bunkers capable to withstand nuclear explosions and nearby sites of mobile launchers with six Arrow 3 missiles each. The US have accidentally published where the exact locations of the bunkers are.

According to press reports, there is also a test stand for rocket engines on the site, where, among other things, the engine for the new Arrow 4 rocket is being tested. In April 2021, the loud sound of an explosion could be heard from there.

== Related nearby places ==
Northwest of the base lies Tel Nof Airbase (see map), where two squadrons of F-15 strike fighter jets are stationed. Since such aircraft can carry free-falling atomic bombs over long distances, it is assumed that the nuclear weapons for this are stored somewhere on the Tel Nof Airbase or in the northwestern part of Sdot Micha, where many depots and bunkers are located.

All of Israel's larger missiles are developed and built at the Israel Aerospace Industries (IAI) MLM Division missile plant south of Be'er Ya'akov, 20 km northwest to the base.

== Units ==
- IAF 2nd Wing
  - 150 Squadron Jericho IRBM / ICBM
  - 199 Squadron Jericho IRBM / ICBM
  - 248 Squadron Jericho IRBM / ICBM
- Arrow 2 missile battery
- Arrow 3 missile battery
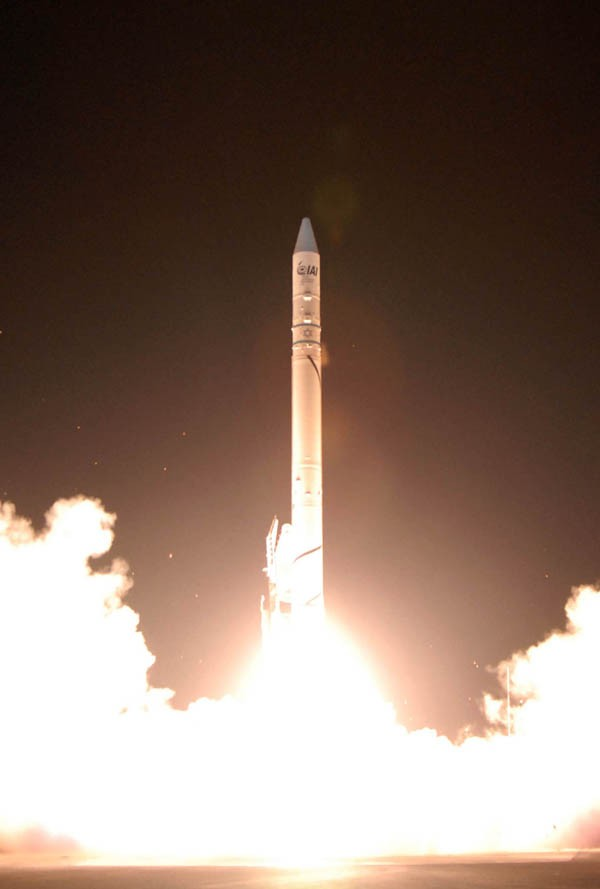
Shavit (civilian Jericho 2) missile launching on 11 June 2007

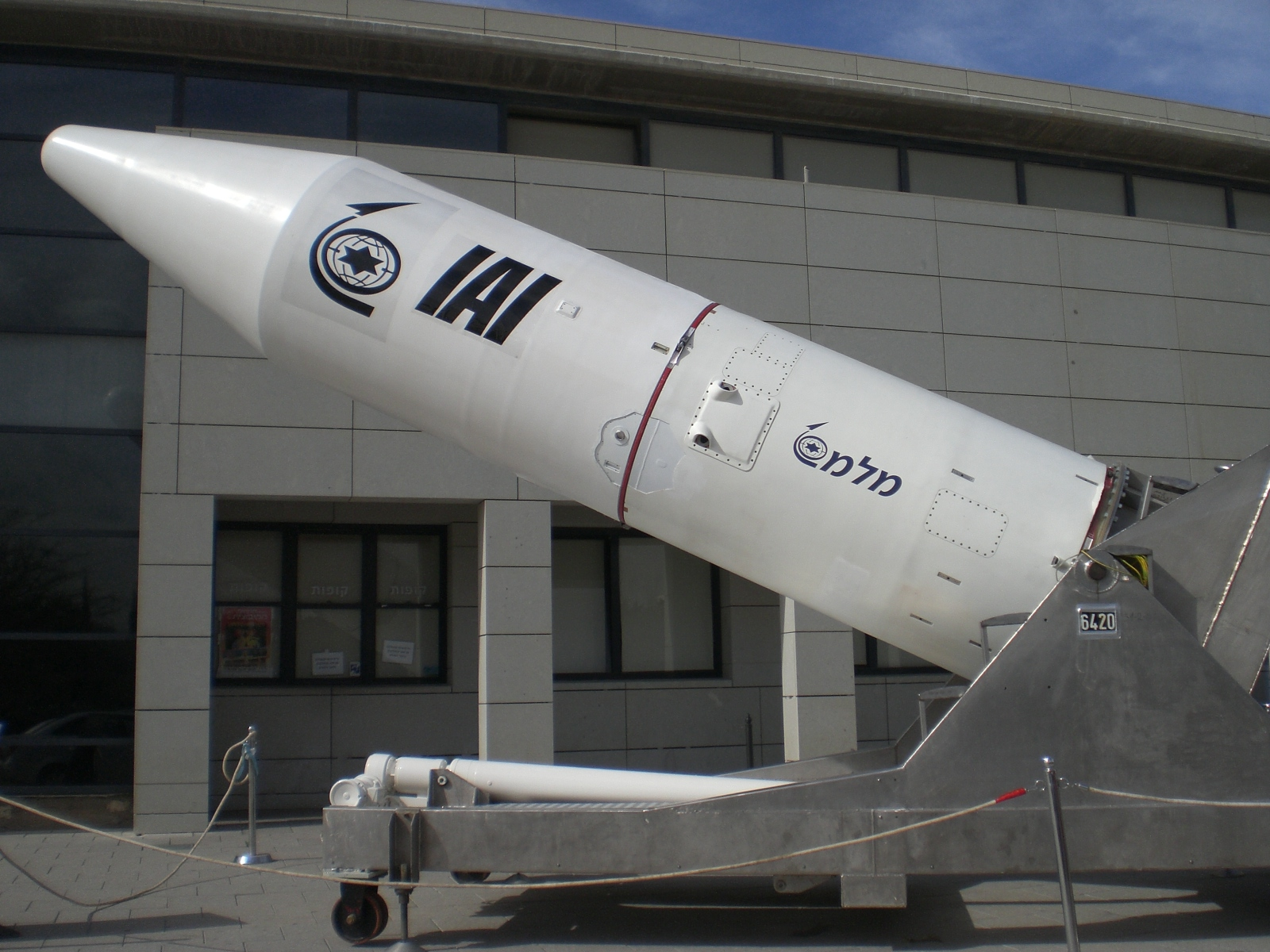
Third stage of a Shavit / Jericho 2 with IAI logo

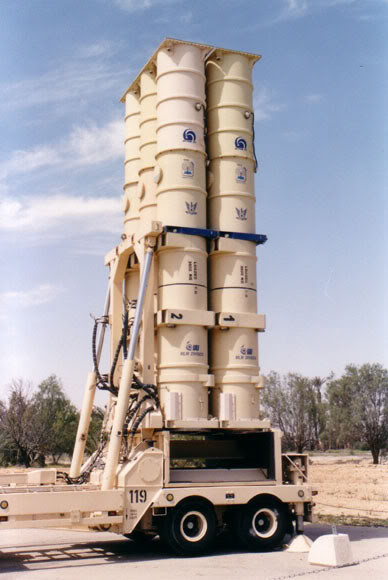
A mobile Arrow 2 launcher, like deployed on the base

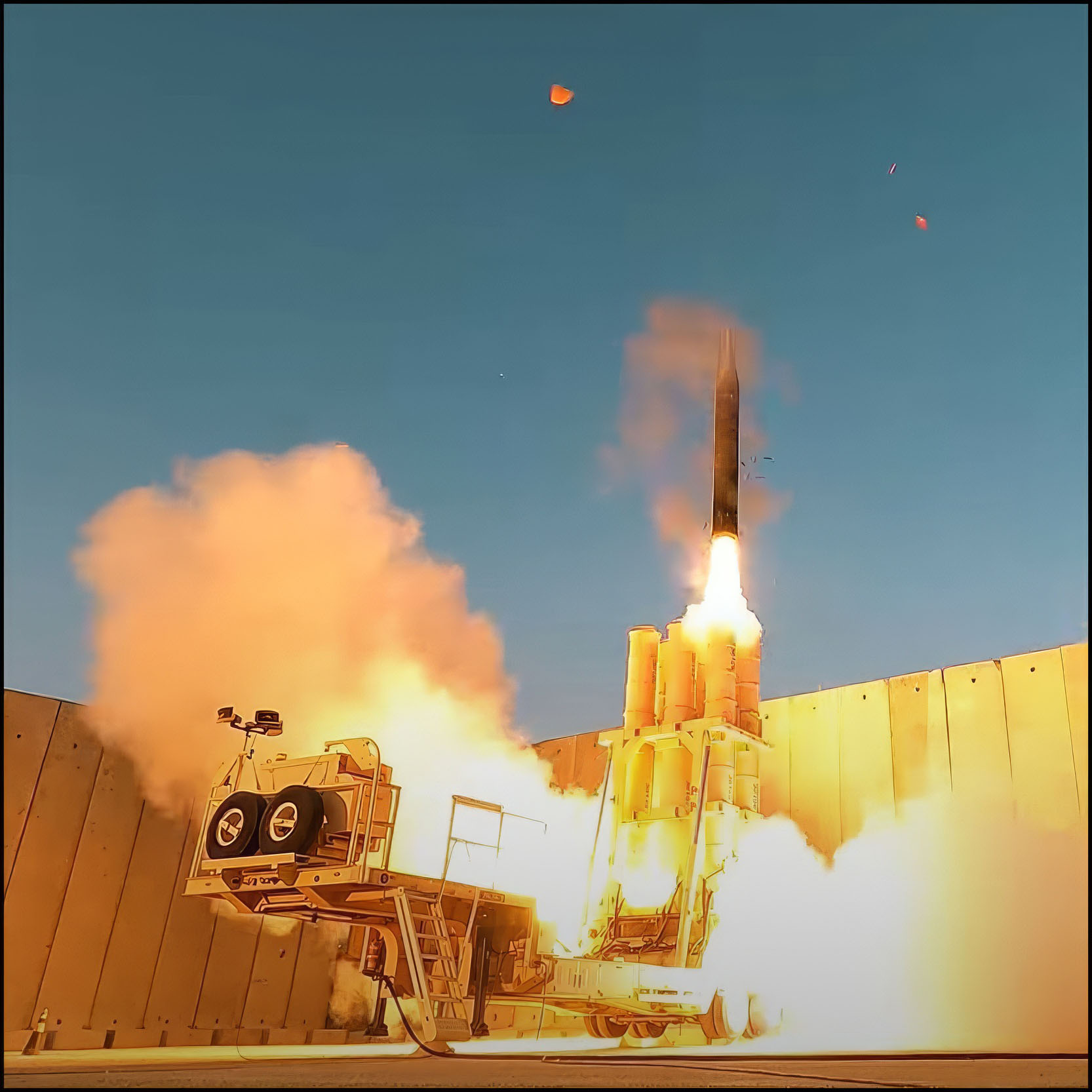
Launch of an Arrow 3 missile in June 2025 during the Iran–Israel war

== History ==
=== Palestine War 1948 ===
Before the 1948 Palestine War, the Palestinian Arab villages of Al-Burayj (Bureij), Sejed, Jilya and Qazaza were located on the site of today's base, but their residents fled or were expelled in the course of the fighting. The taking of the al-Buraij by Israeli soldiers, for example, happened at the beginning of Operation Ha-Har on the night of 19 to 20 October 1948.

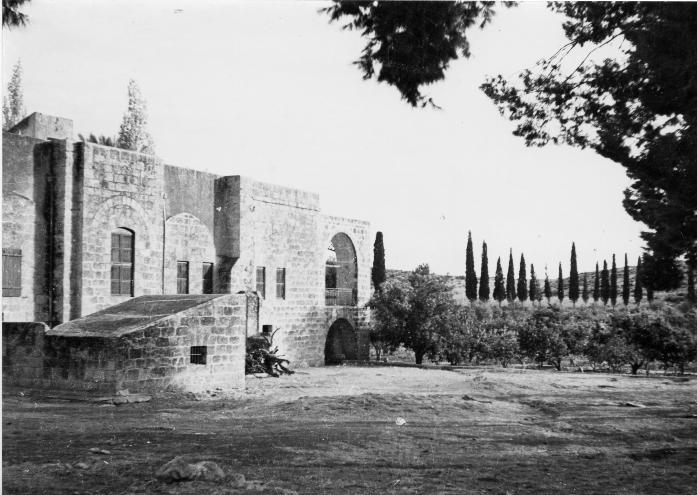
Greek Orthodox monastery in Arab Palestinian village of Al-Burayj, 1948

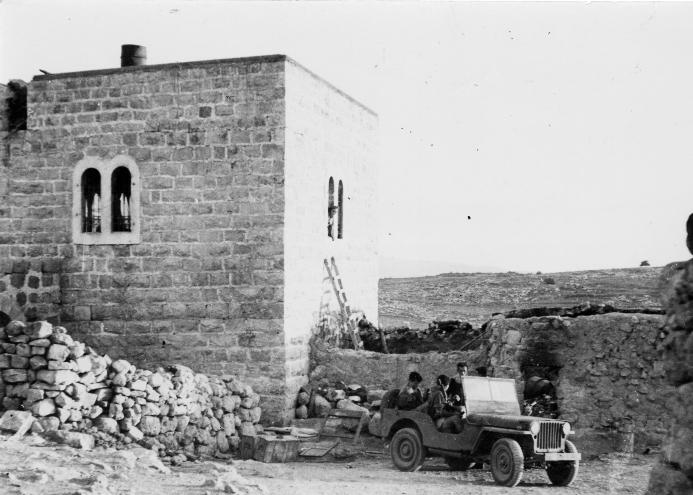
Another photo of the village Al-Burayj after its capture by Israel soldiers in 1948

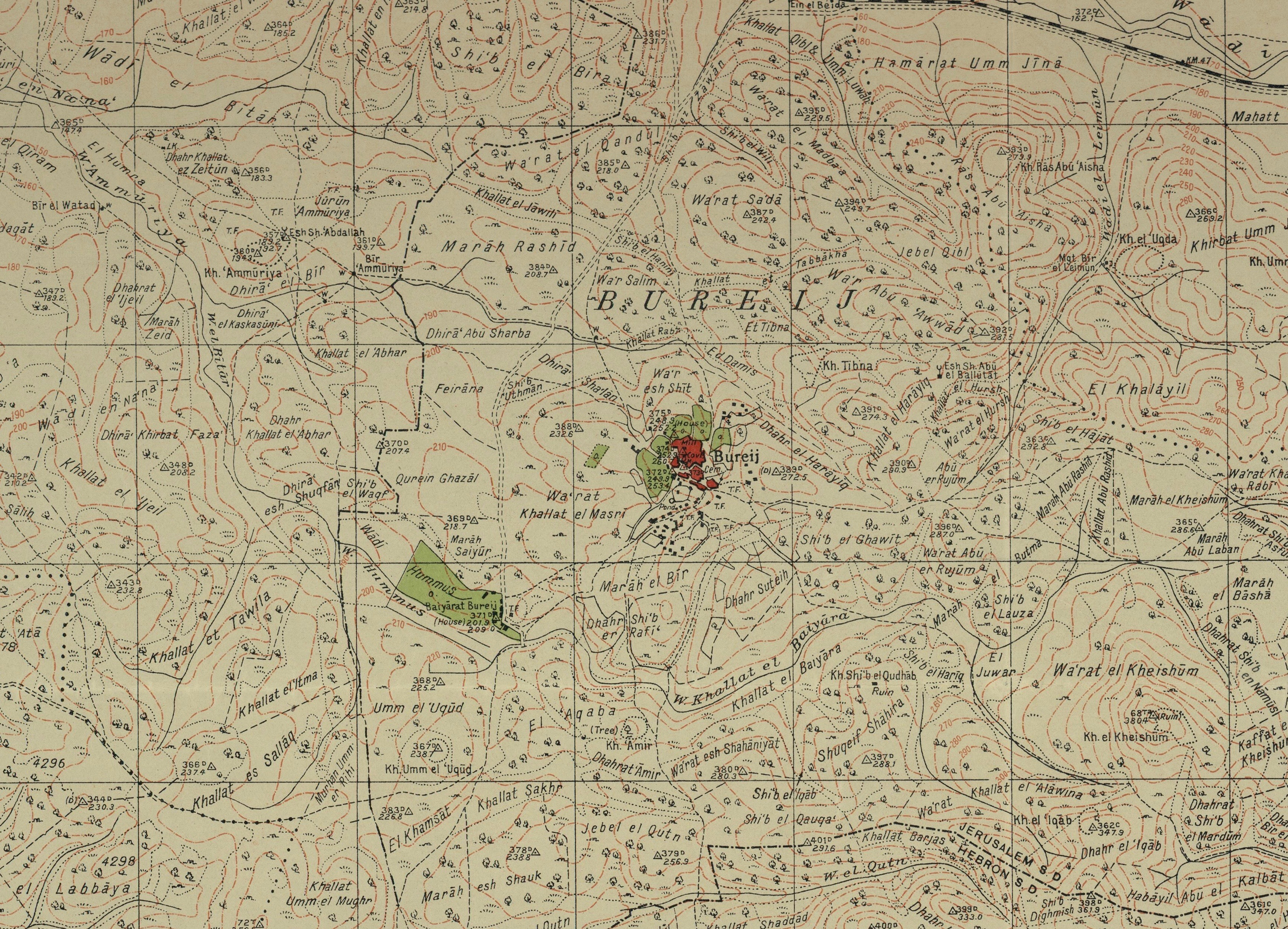
Map of the village Al-Burayj (Bureij) and its surroundings in 1947

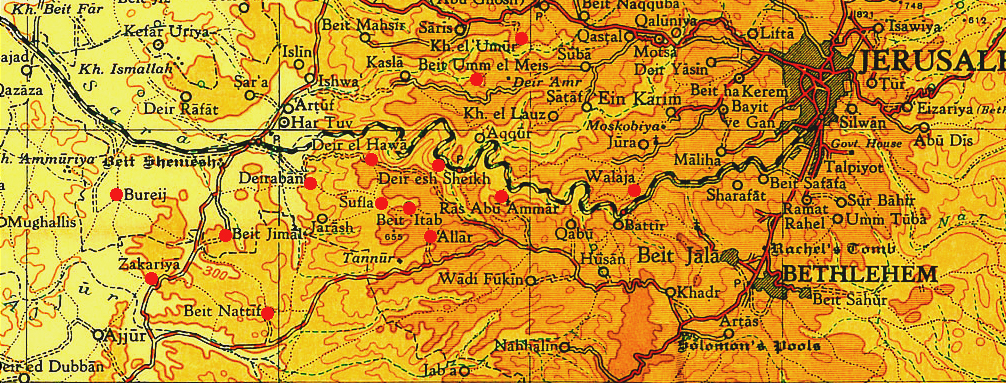
Villages captured by Israel soldiers during Operation Ha-Har in October 1948, Bureij to the left

=== Built in 1962 ===
The extensive base was established in 1962 under the Hebrew name 2 כנף (Wing 2) by the later commander of the IAF Benjamin "Benny" Peled.

According to Seymour Hersh, the construction of the nuclear missile field at Hirbat Zachariah began at late 1967.

=== Yom Kippur War 1973 ===
On 6 October 1973 Egypt and Syria attacked Israel by surprise on the Yom Kippur holiday. As they initially pushed the IDF back, nuclear bombs were said to have been mounted on fighter jets at Tel Nof Airbase and on Jericho missiles at Sdot Micha, with the intent to strike should the enemy armies have advanced further. If true, this did not occur as Israel was able to repel both armies.

=== Hamas attack 2023 ===
On the morning of 7 October 2023, the day of the Hamas-led attack on Israel, a missile fired from the Gaza Strip is said to have hit the base compound, causing a wildfire of 40 hectares, but no military facilities were seriously damaged, as The New York Times claims to have found out based on satellite images. At the same time, it was emphasized that the nuclear warheads presumably stored there in bunkers could never detonate by an accident or external influence.

== See also ==
- Nuclear weapons of Israel
