= Jericho (missile) =

Family of Israeli ballistic missiles

- Type: Ballistic missile
- Place of origin: Israel

Service history
- In service: 1971–1990s (Jericho I); 1989–present (Jericho II); 2011–present (Jericho III)
- Used by: Israel Defense Forces

Production history
- Designer: Initially in collaboration with Dassault Aviation
- Manufacturer: Israel Aerospace Industries
- Unit cost: Classified
- Produced: 1965 onwards (Jericho I); 1980s onwards (Jericho II); 2000s onwards (Jericho III)
- No. built: Classified

Specifications
- Mass: 6,500 kg (Jericho I); 26,000 kg (Jericho II); 30,000 kg (Jericho III)
- Length: 13.4 m (Jericho I); 14.0 m (Jericho II); 15.5 m (Jericho III)
- Diameter: 0.8 m (Jericho I); 1.56 m (Jericho II and III)
- Warhead: 400 kg to 1,300 kg warheads
- Detonation mechanism: Impact and proximity
- Engine: Multiple-stage solid rocket
- Propellant: Solid
- Operational range: 500-660 km (Jericho I); 2,800 km (as Jericho II) or 4,500-7800 (as Shavit); Up to 11,500 km (Jericho III)
- Maximum speed: Hypersonic
- Guidance system: Inertial with terminal guidance
- Launch platform: Silo or Mobile (truck-mounted)

Jericho (Hebrew: יריחו, romanized: Yericho) is a general designation given to a loosely related family of deployed ballistic missiles developed by Israel since the 1960s. The name is taken from the first development contract for the Jericho I signed between Israel and Dassault in 1963, with the codename as a reference to the Biblical city of Jericho. As with some other Israeli high tech weapons systems, exact details are classified, though there are observed test data, public statements by government officials, and details in open literature especially about the Shavit satellite launch vehicle.

The later Jericho family development is related to the Shavit and Shavit II space launch vehicles believed to be derivatives of the Jericho II MRBM and that preceded the development of the Jericho III ICBM. The Lawrence Livermore National Laboratory in the US concluded that the Shavit could be adapted as an ICBM carrying a 500 kg warhead over 7,500 km. Additional insight into the Jericho program was revealed by the South African series of missiles, of which the RSA-3 are believed to be licensed copies of the Jericho II/Shavit, and the RSA-4 that used part of these systems in their stack with a heavy first stage. Subsequent to the declaration and disarming of the South African nuclear program, the RSA series missiles were offered commercially as satellite launch vehicles, resulting in the advertised specifications becoming public knowledge.

The civilian space launch version of the Jericho, the Shavit, was studied in an air launched version piggybacked on a Boeing 747 similar to a U.S. experimental launch of the Minuteman ICBM from a C-5 Galaxy.

== Jericho I ==
Jericho I was first publicly identified being an operational short-range ballistic missile system in late 1971. It was 13.4 metres (44 ft) long, 0.8 m (2 ft 7 in) in diameter, weighing 6.5 tonnes (14,000 lb). It had a range of 500 km (310 mi) and a CEP of 1,000 m (3,300 ft), and it could carry a payload estimated at 400 kilograms (880 lb). It was intended to carry a nuclear warhead. Due to Israel's ambiguity over its nuclear weapons program, the missile is classified as a ballistic missile. Initial development was in conjunction with France, Dassault provided various missile systems from 1963 and a type designated MD-620 was test fired in 1965. French co-operation was halted by an arms embargo in January 1968, though 12 missiles had been delivered from France. Work was continued by IAI at the Beit Zachariah facility and the program cost almost $1 billion up to 1980, incorporating some U.S. technology. Despite some initial problems with its guidance systems, it is believed that around 100 missiles of this type were produced.

In 1969, Israel agreed with the United States that Jericho missiles would not be used as "strategic missiles", with nuclear warheads, until at least 1972.

During the October 1973 Yom Kippur War, with the initial surprise breakthroughs on both northern and southern borders by Arab armies, the alarmed Defense Minister Moshe Dayan told Israeli Prime Minister Golda Meir that "this is the end of the third temple." He was warning of Israel's impending total defeat, but "Temple" was also the code word for nuclear weapons. Dayan again raised the nuclear topic in a cabinet meeting, warning that the country was approaching a point of "last resort". That night Meir authorized the assembly of thirteen nuclear weapon "physics packages" to arm Jericho I missiles at Sdot Micha Airbase, and F-4 aircraft at Tel Nof Airbase, for use against Syrian and Egyptian targets. The range on the Jericho 1 is sufficient to strike major cities such as Damascus and Cairo from secured launch locations. They would be used if absolutely necessary to prevent total defeat, but the preparation was done in an easily detectable way, likely as a signal to the US. U.S. Secretary of State Henry Kissinger learned of the nuclear alert on the morning of October 9. That day, in keeping with his deal and warning that prevented a preemptive Israeli attack on gathering Arab armies, President Nixon ordered the commencement of Operation Nickel Grass, a U.S. airlift to replace all of Israel's material losses. Anecdotal evidence suggests that Kissinger told Sadat that the reason for the U.S. airlift was that the Israelis were close to "going nuclear".

It is believed that all Jericho 1 missiles were taken out of service in the 1990s and replaced with the longer-range Jericho 2. The Jericho 1 missiles were housed in Zekharia, located southeast of Tel Aviv and stationed in caves.

== Jericho II ==
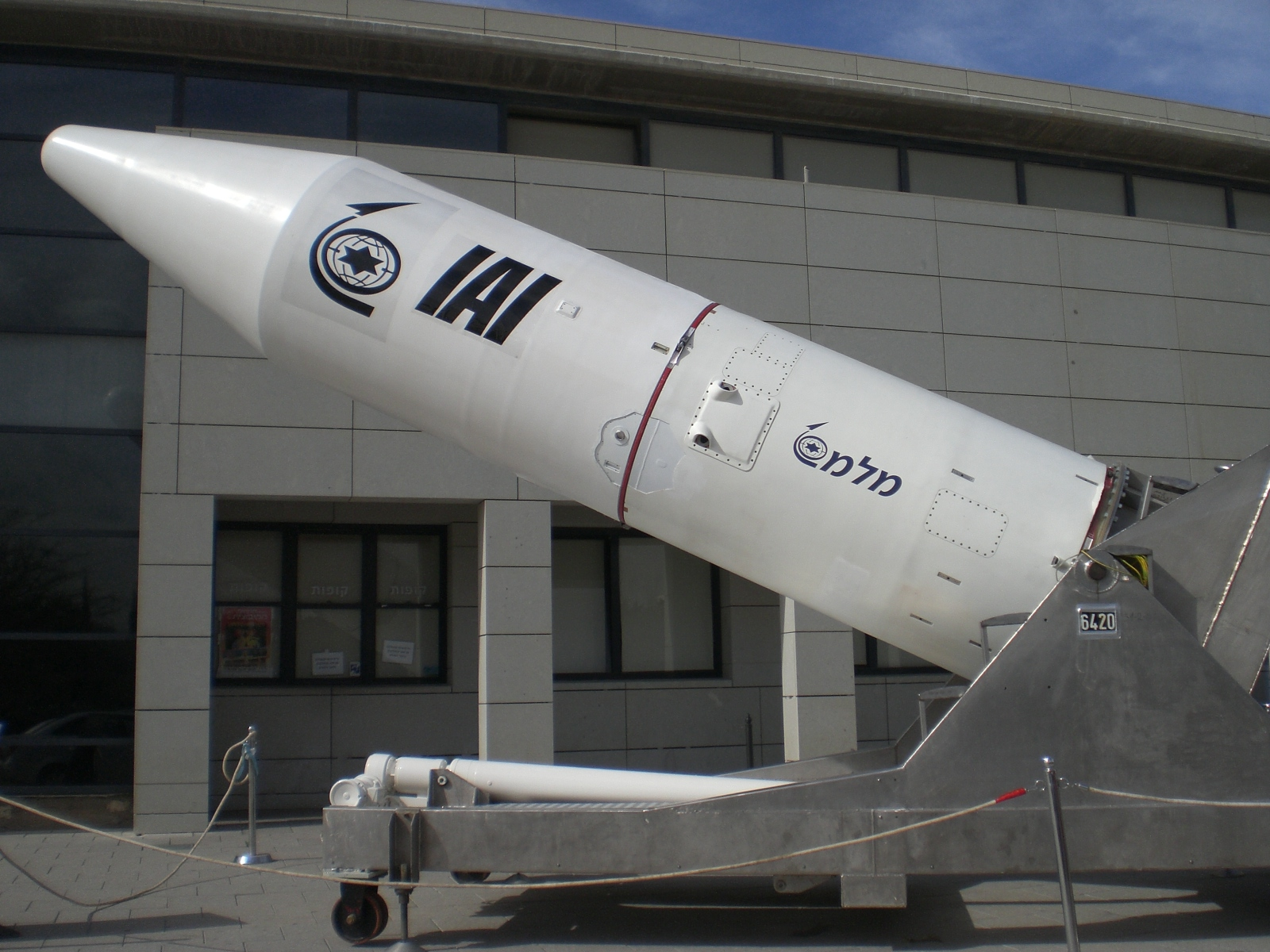
Shavit 3rd stage

The Jericho II (YA-3) is a solid fuel, two-stage ballistic missile system and a follow on from the Jericho I project. It is classified by some sources as a medium-ranged ballistic missile and others as an intermediate-ranged ballistic missile. As many as 90 Jericho 2 missiles are currently based in caves near Zekharia (Sdot Micha Airbase), southeast of Tel Aviv.

A request from Israel for 1,100 miles (1,800 km) range Pershing II medium range ballistic missiles was rejected by the United States for inclusion as part of a military assistance incentive package offered in 1975 during negotiations over transferring the Sinai from Israeli to Egyptian control as part of a US-brokered peace deal. Jericho II development began in 1977, and by 1986 there were reports of test firings. According to Missilethreat, a project of the George C. Marshall Institute, there is evidence the Jericho II originated as a joint Israeli-Iranian project, cooperation that ended with the loss of friendly relations after the 1979 Iranian Revolution overthrew the Shah's rule. There was a series of test launches into the Mediterranean from 1987 to 1992, the longest at around 1,300 km, mostly from the facility at Palmachim, south of Tel Aviv. Jane's reports that a test launch of 1,400 km is believed to have taken place from South Africa's Overberg Test Range in June 1989.

The Jericho II is 14.0 m long and 1.56 m wide, with a reported launch weight of 26,000 kg (although an alternative launch weight of 21,935 kg has been suggested). It has a 1,000 kg payload and uses a two-stage solid propellant engine with a separating warhead. The missile can be launched from a silo, a railroad flat car, or a mobile vehicle. This gives it the ability to be hidden, moved quickly, or kept in a hardened silo, largely ensuring survival against any attack. It has an active radar homing terminal guidance system similar to that of the Pershing II, for very accurate strikes.

The Jericho II forms the basis of the three-stage, 23 ton Shavit NEXT satellite launcher, first launched in 1988 from Palmachim. From the performance of Shavit it has been estimated that as a ballistic missile it has a maximum range of about 7,800 km with a 500 kg payload.

The Jericho II as an available Israeli counterattack option to Iraqi missile bombardment in the 1991 Gulf War is disputed. Jane's at the time believed that Jericho II entered service in 1989. Researcher Seth Carus claims that, according to an Israeli source, the decision to operationally deploy the Jericho-2 was only made after 1994, several years after the Scud attacks had ended and a cease fire and disarmament regime were in place. Raytheon Technologies, quoting Soviet intelligence archives, showed them believing the Jericho-2 to have been fully developed weapon in 1989, but did not indicate when it was available for deployment. Investigators for the Carnegie Endowment for International Peace accessed commercial satellite images of the Sdot Micha Airbase near Zachariah, a suspected Jericho missile base, comparison shows expansion between 1989 and 1993 of the type that would accommodate suspected Jericho II launchers and missiles. Such an expansion would be more consistent with a post-1991 deployment chronology.

== Jericho III ==
It is believed that the Jericho III (YA-4) is a nuclear-armed ICBM that entered service in 2011. The Jericho III is believed to have two or three-stages, using solid propellant and having a payload of 1,000 to 1,300 kg. The payload could be a single 750 kg (150–400 kiloton) nuclear warhead or two or three low-yield MIRV warheads. It has an estimated launch weight of 30,000 kg and a length of 15.5 m with a width of 1.56 m. It may be similar to an upgraded and re-designed Shavit space launch vehicle, produced by Israel Aerospace Industries. It probably has longer first and second-stage motors. It is estimated by missilethreat.com that it has a range of 4,800 to 6,500 km (3,000 to 4,000 mi), though a 2004 missile proliferation survey by the Congressional Research Service put its possible maximum range at 11,500 km (missile range is inversely proportional to payload mass).

According to an official report that was submitted to the U.S. Congress in 2004, it may be that with a payload of 1,000 kg the Jericho III gives Israel nuclear strike capabilities within the entire Middle East, Africa, Europe, Asia and almost all parts of North America, as well as large parts of South America and North Oceania. Missile Threat reports: "The range of the Jericho 3 also provides an extremely high impact speed for nearby targets, enabling it to avoid any Anti-Ballistic Missile (ABM) defenses that may develop in the immediate region." On 17 January 2008 Israel test fired a multi-stage ballistic missile believed to be of the Jericho III type, reportedly capable of carrying "conventional or non conventional warheads." On 2 November 2011, Israel successfully test fired a missile believed to be an upgraded version of the Jericho III from Palmachim; the long trail of smoke was seen throughout central Israel. Israel's intercontinental ballistic missile launchers are believed to be buried so deeply that they would survive a first strike nuclear attack.

After a successful missile test launch conducted in early 2008, Israeli weapons expert General Itzhak Ben-Israel, former chairman of the Israeli Space Agency at the Ministry of Science, said "Everybody can do the mathematics... we can reach with a rocket engine to every point in the world", thus appearing to confirm Israel's new capability. Israeli Ministry of Defense officials said that the 2008 test launch represented a "dramatic leap in Israel's missile technologies".

After a further test in 2013 Alon Ben David published this opinion in an article in Aviation Week on the missile's range and throw weight: "Reportedly, Israel's Jericho III intermediate-range ballistic missile is capable of carrying a 1,000 kg (2,200 lb) warhead more than 5,000 km." Further tests conducted in July 2013 could have been for the Jericho 3 or possibly the Jericho 3A missile, a follow-up missile believed to have a new motor.

== Jericho IV ==
In 2019, a successful test launch was conducted by Israel of a rocket, which was subsequently referred to as the "Jericho 4" by Israeli mass media. Despite this designation, the specific distinctions between the Jericho 4 and its predecessor, the Jericho 3, remain undisclosed. 2024 article provides more details: "... the Jericho 4, a three-stage missile, whose capabilities will include the possibility of carrying fragmentation warheads."

== South African RSA Series ==
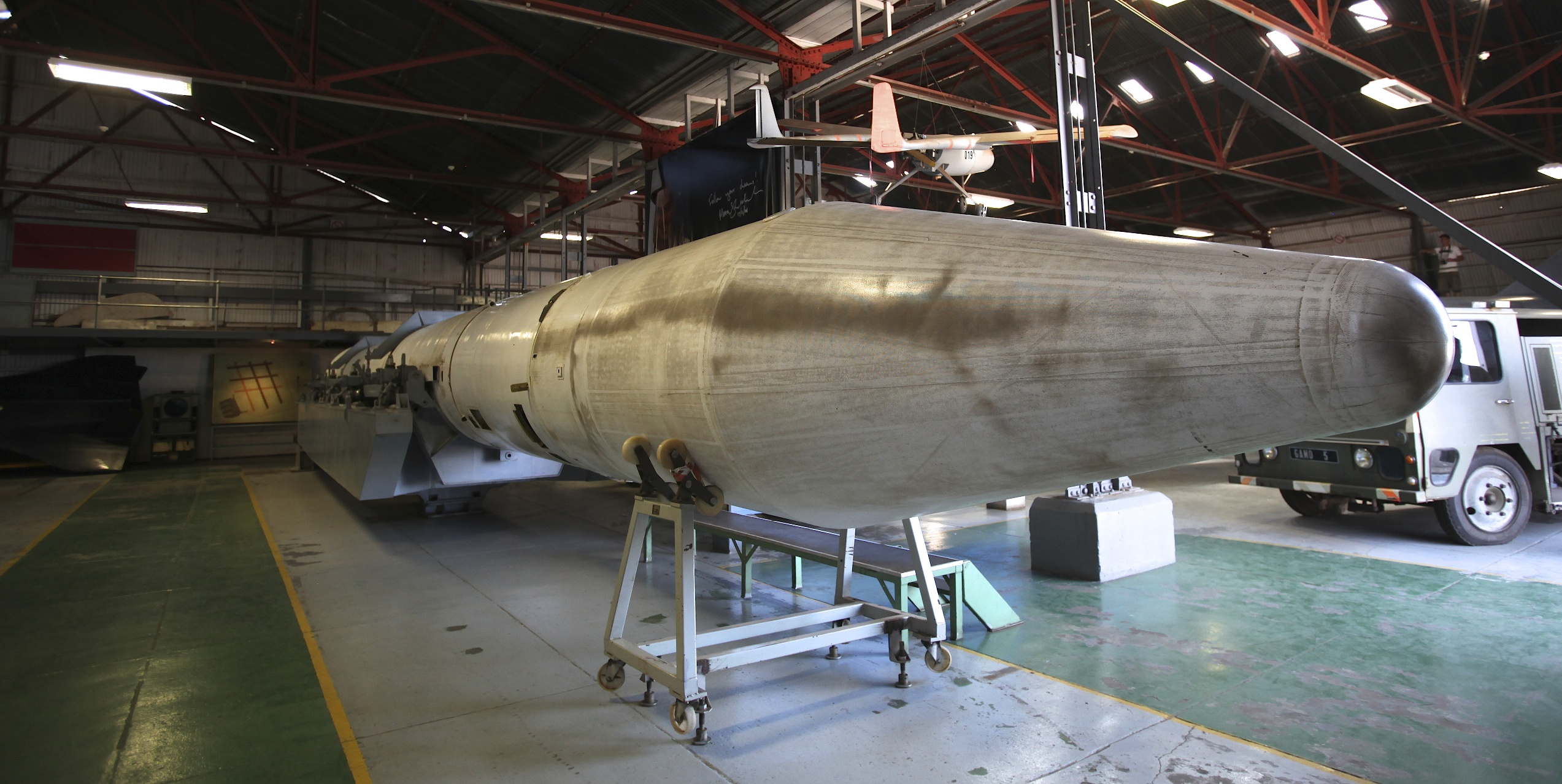
RSA-3

The Jericho II/Shavit SLV was also license produced in the Republic of South Africa as the RSA series of space launch vehicles and ballistic missiles.

The RSA-3 was produced by the Houwteq (a discontinued division of Denel) company at Grabouw, 30 km east of Cape Town. Test launches were made from Overberg Test Range near Bredasdorp, 200 km east of Cape Town. Rooi Els was where the engine test facilities were located. Development continued even after South African renunciation of its nuclear weapons for use as a commercial satellite launcher. Development reached its height in 1992, a year after nuclear renunciation, with 50–70 companies involved which employed 1300–1500 people from the public and private sector. A much heavier ICBM or space launch vehicle, the RSA-4, with a first stage in the Peacekeeper ICBM class but with Jericho-2/RSA-3 upper stage components was in development, the RSA-2 was a local copy of the Jericho II ballistic missile and the RSA-1 was a local copy of the Jericho II second stage for use as a mobile missile.

The missiles were to be based on the RSA-3 and RSA-4 launchers that had already been built and tested for the South African space programme. According to Al J Venter, author of How South Africa Built Six Atom Bombs, these missiles were incompatible with the available large South African nuclear warheads, he claims that the RSA series being designed for a 340 kg payload would suggest a warhead of some 200 kg, "well beyond SA's best efforts of the late 1980s." Venter's analysis is that the RSA series was intended to display a credible delivery system combined with a separate nuclear test in a final diplomatic appeal to the world powers in an emergency even though they were never intended to be used in a weaponized system together. Three rockets had already been launched into suborbital trajectories in the late 1980s in support of development of the RSA-3 launched Greensat Orbital Management System (for commercial satellite applications of vehicle tracking and regional planning). Following the decision in 1989 to cancel the nuclear weapons program, the missile programs were allowed to continue until 1992, when military funding ended, and all ballistic missile work was stopped by mid-1993. In order to join the Missile Technology Control Regime, the government had to allow U.S. supervision of the destruction of key facilities applicable to both the long range missile and the space launch programmes.

Variant	Date of launch	Launch location	Payload	Mission status
RSA-3	1989 June 1	Overberg Test Range	(South Africa) RSA-3-d 1	Apogee: 100 km (62 mi)
RSA-3	1989 July 6	Overberg Test Range	(South Africa) RSA-3 2	Apogee: 300 km (190 mi)
RSA-3	1990 November 19	Overberg Test Range	(South Africa) RSA-3 3	Apogee: 300 km (190 mi)

In June 1994, the RSA-3 / RSA-4 South African satellite launcher program was cancelled.

== Potential targeting ==
=== Jericho I ===
Journalist Seymour Hersh wrote that during the Israeli losses in the 1973 Yom Kippur War, Jericho I missiles at Sdot Micha Airbase, as well as nuclear-armed McDonnell Douglas F-4 Phantom IIs, were ordered by Prime Minister Golda Meir to be brought as operational as possible, potentially including the loading of the separately stored 20 kiloton nuclear warheads. The targets would have included the military headquarters of Egypt and Syria, in Cairo and Damascus respectively, but the blast would have destroyed the cities, with similar yields to the atomic bombings of Hiroshima and Nagasaki.

=== Jericho II and III ===
Hans M. Kristensen and others of the Federation of American Scientists have suggested politically relevant targets for the medium-range Jericho II missile, completed in the 1980s, as the western half of Iran, the southernmost cities of the Soviet Union, such as Yerevan, Tbilisi, and Sevastopol, including the Black Sea Fleet based there.

Suggested relevant targets for the Jericho III, completed in the 2000s, include all of Iran, including Tehran, all of Pakistan, and all of Russia west of the Urals, including Moscow.

== See also ==
- Shavit
- Military equipment of Israel
- List of missiles
