= Balcony of Abyss =

Book by Ibrahim Nasrallah

- First edition (Arabic)
- Author: Ibrahim Nasrallah
- Language: Arabic
- Series: Balcony
- Genre: Literary Fiction
- Published: 2013
- Publisher: Arabic Scientific Publishers
- Pages: 325

Balcony of Abyss is one of the novels in the Balcony series by the Palestinian author Ibrahim Nasrallah. The novel was first published in 2013 by the Arabic Scientific Publishers. The novel was longlisted for the International Prize for Arabic Fiction in 2014.

== The Balcony Series ==
The ‘Balcony’ series consists of a number of novels, each novel standing on its own. This series is the other face to his “Malhamatul Malhatil Filistiniya” or “Palestinian Comedy.”

== About The Novel ==
The novel consists of three characters: A professor, a lawyer, and an executive minister. These characters live in a divided reality spanning twenty years before Arab revolutions, up until the final blow. The minister knows nothing other than land violation. The professor knows nothing other than harassing his students. The lawyer knows nothing other than injustice. In the background, the besieged human margin is the only thing able to resist this fascism. ‘Balcony of Abyss’ is a novel about the layers of the human ego, as well as the layer of Arab bureaucracy, and its ability to change its appearance without changing its principles.
