= Sawad Hussain =

British translator of Arabic literature into English

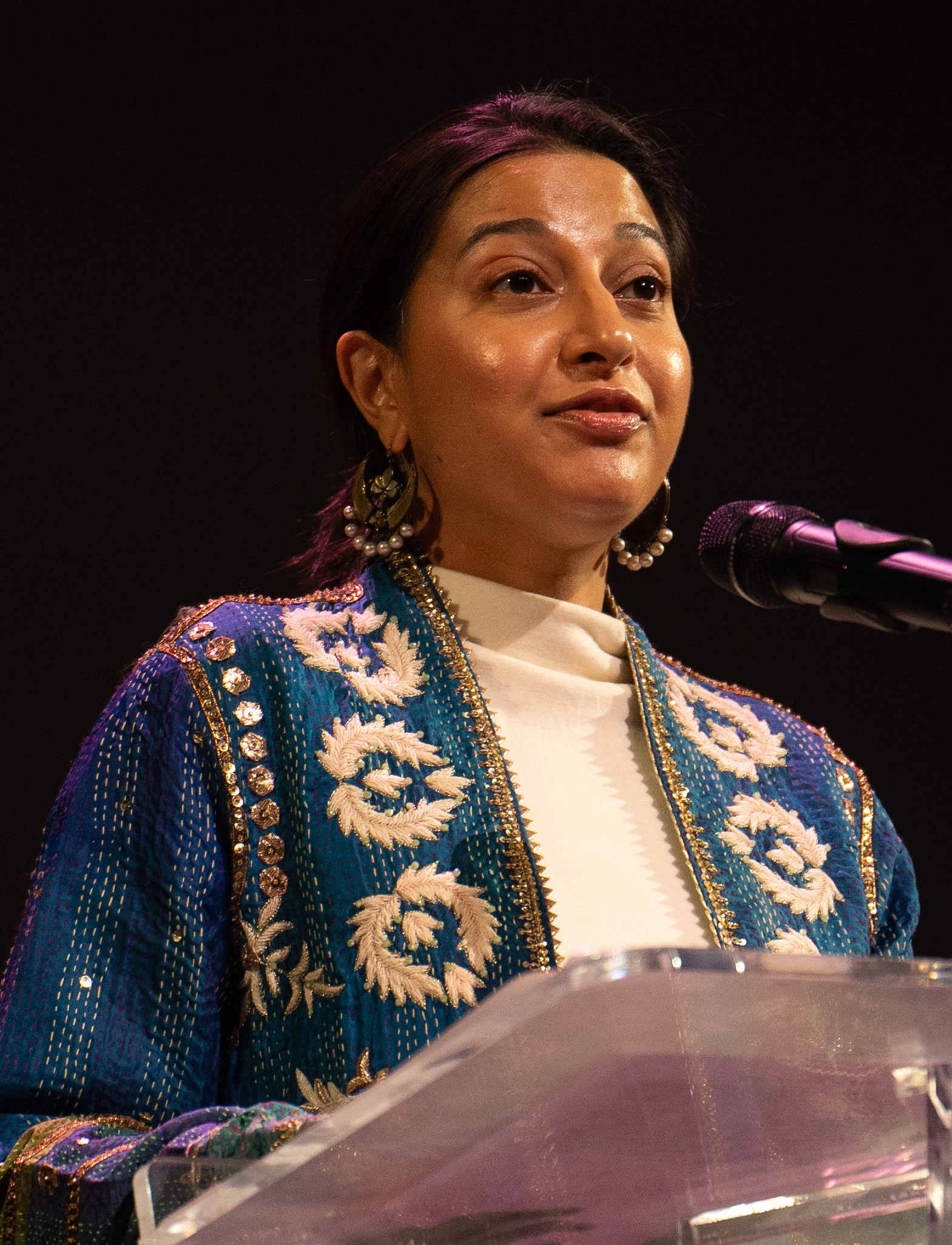
- Hussain at the 2024 National Book Awards finalist reading
- Education: School of Oriental and African Studies
- Occupations: Literary translator from Arabic to English, writer
- Writing career
- Period: 2012–present
- Genres: Contemporary Arabic literature; Arabic Young Adults literature
- Website: sawadhussain.com

Sawad Hussain is a writer and translator of contemporary Arabic literature into English, based in Cambridge, United Kingdom. She is known for her award-winning translations, as lecturer and speaker on the field of literary translation and for her contributions to contemporary Arabic literature in English-language publications.

== Life and career ==
Hussain graduated with an MA degree in Modern Arabic literature from the School of Oriental and African Studies at the University of London. Apart from her translations of Arabic novels and short stories into English, she is a regular contributor to literary journals such as ArabLit and Asymptote magazine. Through her participation in international conferences and workshops, she is active in mentoring literary translators and in developing the field of literary translation in general. She has been a lecturer and guest speaker at numerous literary events, including the Shubbak Festival of Contemporary Arab Culture in London. Among other literary organizations, the English PEN writers association, the Anglo-Omani Society, the Armory Square Prize for Literary Translation and the Palestine Book Awards have commended her work. Further, Hussain served as one of the Chair officers of the Translator's Association in the United Kingdom.

Hussain is a member of the board of trustees of the "Bait Al Ghasham - Dar Arab International Award" for translating Arabic literature into English, organized in cooperation by the Omani Bait Al Ghasham Foundation and London-based Dar Arab publishers. During a conference on the occasion of the 2024 award ceremony, she said that for most Western publishers, Arabic literature still evokes expectations of "desert scenes with palm trees" and similar stereotypes.

Commenting on the scant number of translations of African literature written in Arabic, for example from Sudan or by Eritrean-born writer Haji Jaber, Hussain has also been spreading narratives by African writers for Western audiences. Another sub-genre Hussain has been translating are Arabic novels for young adults, including The Djinn's Apple by Algerian writer Djamila Morani and Ghady and Rawan by Lebanese authors Fatima Sharafeddine and Samar Mahfouz Barraj, co-translated with Marcia Lynx Qualey.

In September 2020, the American magazine Publishing Perspectives and the prestigious Sheikh Zayed Book Award organized a webinar entitled "The Reality of Translating Children's Literature from Arabic to Other Languages". The webinar featured Hussain and Robert Morgan, publisher and director of Canadian publishing house Bookland Press, and was moderated by Porter Anderson, editor-in-chief of Publishing Perspectives. A focus of this virtual conference was the significance of the Sheikh Zayed Book Award's annual prize for Arabic children's literature since 2017.

== Critical reception ==
In 2023, Hussain's translation of Bushra al-Maqtari's non-fiction work What Have You Left Behind? was shortlisted for the Warwick Prize for Women in Translation. Also in 2023, the English PEN Translates programme awarded a grant to Hussain for her forthcoming translation of Ishraga Mustafa' s Woman of the Rivers, the first memoir of a woman writer from Sudan in English translation.

== Awards and distinctions ==
- Translator-in-Residence at the Princeton Institute for International and Regional Studies
- 2023: shortlisted by the Warwick Prize for Women in Translation
- 2023: English PEN Translates grant
- 2023: longlisted by the Christopher G. Moore Foundation prize for Human Rights writing
- 2021: Saif Ghobash Banipal Prize for Arabic Literary Translation

== Selected works ==
=== Literary translations ===
- Fatima Sharafeddine and Samar Mahfouz Barraj. Ghadi and Rawan. University of Texas Press, 2019, ISBN 978-1477318522.
- Sahar Khalifeh (2020). Passage to the Plaza. Seagull Books. OCLC 1139137431.
- Bushra al-Maqtari. What Have You Left Behind? Fitzcarraldo Editions, 2023, ISBN 978-1804270011.
- Shahla Ujayli. A Bed for the King’s Daughter. Center for Middle Eastern Studies/University of Texas Press, 2021, ISBN 9781477322284.
- Najwa Binshatwan. Catalogue of a Private Life. Dedalus Books, ISBN 978 1 912868 72 8.
- Stella Gaitano. Edo's Souls. Dedalus Books, 2023, ISBN 978 1 915568 13 7.
- Haji Jaber. Black Foam. Amazon Publishing, 2023, ISBN 9781542034036.
- Djamila Morani. The Djinn's Apple. Neem Tree Press, 2024, ISBN 978-1911107859.
- Ishraga Mustafa. Woman of the Rivers (forthcoming).

=== Articles ===
- Castañeda, Ricardo Chavez; Magallanes, Alejandro; Schimel, Lawrence; Morani, Djamila; Hussain, Sawad; Yu, Pei-Yun (2024-03-27). "Travel the World Through Young Adult Literature". Kirkus Feature Articles and Interviews.
- Hussain, Sawad; Youssef, Nariman (2020-03-18). "Beyond Representation: Life Writing by Women in Arabic". Words Without Borders.
- Hussain, Sawad. "The End of a Residency". www.newwriting.net. (On resources for editing translations)

== See also ==
- Contemporary Arabic literature by women writers
