= Hoshank Osi =

Syrian writer and journalist

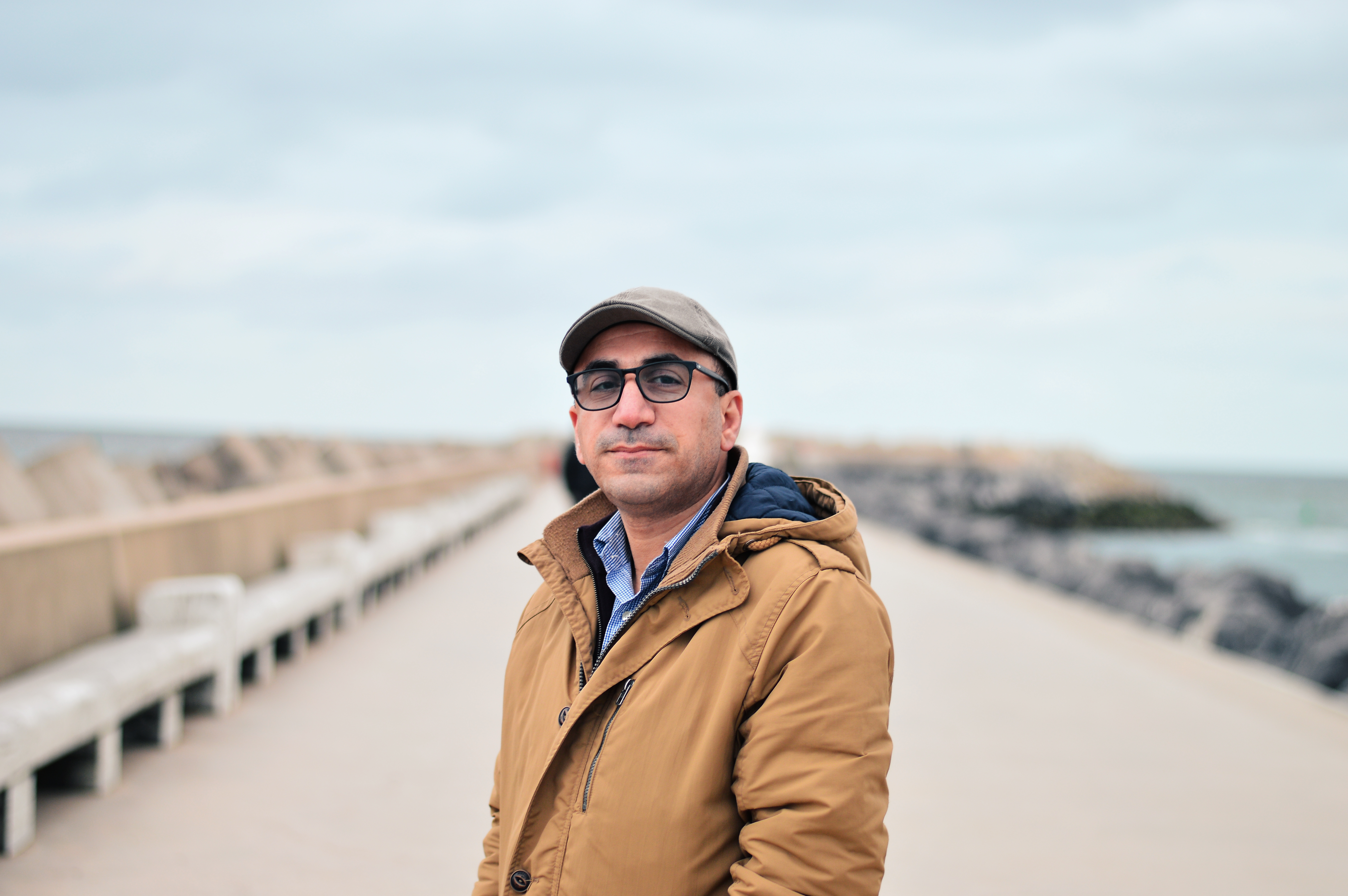
- Osi in 2017
- Born: 1976 (age 49–50); Al-Malikiyah, Syria
- Occupations: Writer, poet, journalist
- Awards: Won the Katara Prize for Arabic Novel for his novel "The Plight of the Questions and the Lust of Imagination"

Hoshank Osi (Arabic :هوشنك أوسي), a Syrian writer, poet and a journalist, was born in 1976. He has published nine poetry collections and three novels including "The Plight of the Questions and the Lust of Imagination" which won the Katara Prize for Arabic Novel in 2017.

== Education and career ==
Hoshank Osi is a writer, poet, and journalist who was born in Al-Malikiyah, northeastern Syria in 1976. He has published many articles in various newspapers, incdluing "Al-Mustaqbal", "Al-Safir", "Al-Khaleej", "Al-sharq Al Awsat", the Arab Institute for Studies, and the Future Center for Research and Advanced Studies. Some of his articles were translated into Turkish and was published in "Gunlik", "Radikal" and "Al-Jazeera Turk" newspapers. Osi worked as programmer and news editor for the Kurdish channel "Roj TV". He started his literary career as a poet in 2001 and published nine poetry collections. His first novel "The Plight of the Questions and Lust of Imagination" was published in 2017 and won the Katara Prize for Arabic Novel.

== Works ==
=== Novels ===
- "The Plight of the Questions and the Lust of Imagination" (original title: Wataat Yaqeen; mehnat al su’al wa shahwat al khayal”, 2017
- “Open … Illusions Party” (original title: Haflat Awham .. Maftooha), 2018
- “The Afghani: Worried Skies” (original title: Al Afghani: Samawat Qaliqa), 2020

== Awards and honors ==
- He was ranked fourth in the poetry competition organized by the Al-Ayyam Algerian Foundation, 2010
- He was honored by the Association of Kurdish Journalists and Writers in Syria.
- Won the Katara Prize for Arabic Novel in the category of published novels for his novel "The Plight of the Questions and the Lust of Imagination", 2017
