= Amir Taj al-Sir =

Sudanese literary writer and medical doctor

Amir Taj al-Sir أمير تاج السر
- Born: 1960 (age 65–66); Northern Sudan
- Education: Tanta University
- Occupations: Novelist, medical doctor
- Writing career
- Language: Arabic
- Notable awards: Katara Prize for Arabic Novel (2015)

Amir Tag Elsir (Arabic: أمير تاج السر, born 1960), also written Amir Taj al-Sir, is a Sudanese medical doctor and novelist, writing in Arabic. He has published more than 20 works of poetry, biography and novels, some of these translated into English or other languages. His novels deal with contemporary social issues, like poverty, the lives of refugees or diseases, such as Ebola.

== Life and literary career ==
Tag Elsir was born in northern Sudan in 1960 and graduated from Tanta University in Egypt. He lives and works as a medical doctor in Doha, Qatar.

His first novel Karmakul came out in 1988. In 2015, he won the Katara Prize for Arabic Novel for his story of love and crime, entitled 366. In addition, several of his other novels were shortlisted for the prestigious International Prize for Arabic Fiction.

Commenting on the novel Telepathy, literary critic M.A. Orthofer said, Tag Elsir creates the fiction of "a successful Sudanese writer, who finds that his most recent novel, called Hunger's Hopes, turns out to be closer to real life than he had any reason to believe." According to a review in Sudanese online magazine Andariya, his novels treat contemporary social issues "like the exploitation of the refugees and their harsh living conditions, and tackles the issue of poverty plaguing the citizens of the country."

In fact, my project is based on humanitarian and human causes in general. It detects all the important issues which could be raised at this time and all times, such as poverty, ignorance, disease, and wars that destroy everything, included cities and ideas and cause homelessness, and lots of complications. Men and women have got the right to dream and to realize some of their dreams, but this does not happen very often.

— Sudanow Magazine, Sudan International Novelist: Amir Tag-Elsir

== Selected works in English translation ==
- French Perfume (2009)
- The Grub Hunter (2010). Pearson Education. ISBN 978-0435134808
- The Korak council (2012)
- The Yelling Dowry (2013). Moment Digibooks Limited ISBN 978-1291452846
- Telepathy (2015). Bloomsbury Qatar Foundation Publishing. ISBN 978-9927101892
- Ebola '76 (2015). London: Darf Publishers. ISBN 9781850772743
- 366 (2016)

== See also ==
- Sudanese literature
- List of Sudanese writers
- Modern Arabic literature
