= Shahla Ujayli =

Syrian writer (born 1976)

- Born: 1976 (age 49–50); Raqqa, Syria
- Education: University of Aleppo
- Occupations: Literary writer and academic
- Writing career
- Period: 2005 - present
- Genre: Contemporary Arabic literature
- Notable works: A Bed for the King’s Daughter, A Sky so Close to Us, Summer with the Enemy
- Notable awards: Al Multaqa Prize for the Arabic Short Story

Shahla Ujayli (born 1976) is a Syrian fiction writer and academic. A laureate of the Al Multaqa Prize for Arabic short stories, she became notable for her short story collection A Bed for the King’s Daughter and for her novels Summer with the Enemy and A Sky Close to Us. Some of her works have been translated into English and German. Her work is part of contemporary Syrian literature in the context of imprisonment, war and exile.

== Life and career ==
Ujayli studied modern Arabic literature at Aleppo University, graduating with a doctorate. Subsequently, she became a lecturer at the American University in Madaba, Jordan. She made her literary debut in 2005, publishing a short story collection called The Mashrabiyya.

Her first novels, written in Arabic, were The Cat's Eye (2006) that won the Jordan State Award for Literature, Persian Carpet (2013) and A Sky Close to Us (2015). The last-named book was nominated for the 2016 International Prize for Arabic Fiction (IPAF). Her short story collection A Bed for the King’s Daughter, published in Arabic in 2017, was awarded the Al Multaqa Prize. Ujayli was also a participant at the 2014 IPAF nadwa, an annual writing workshop for promising emerging writers. In 2019, her novel Summer with the Enemy was again shortlisted for the IPAF.

== Selected works ==
=== Fiction in English translation ===
- A Bed for the King’s Daughter. Short stories. Translated by Sawad Hussain. Center for Middle Eastern Studies/University of Texas Press, 2021, ISBN 9781477322284.
- Summer with the Enemy. Translated by Hartman, Michelle. Northampton, Massachusetts: Interlink Books. 2020. ISBN 978-1-62371-867-1.
- A Sky So Close to Us. Translated by Hartman, Michelle. Interlink Books. 2018. ISBN 978-1-62371-983-8.

=== Academic studies ===
- Mirror of Strangeness: Articles on Cultural Criticism (2006)
- The Syrian Novel: Experimentalism and Theoretical Categories (2009)
- Cultural Particularity in the Arabic Novel (2011)
- Transformation of Identity in the Arab Novel: Jordanian Novel as a Model. Dirasat: Human and Social Sciences. 45(2), 27-41, 2018.
- The Aesthetic Identity of Arabic Novel: Post-Colonial Perspective. Beirut: Amman, Algeria: Dhifaf- Majaz- Ekhtilaf, 2020
- Ujayli, Shahla (2020-03-24). "The Role of Personal Story in Making Arab Feminist Narrated History". Arabic and World Literature: Comparative and Multidisciplinary Perspectives. 2 (1). American University of Madaba, Jordan. doi:10.31526/AWL.2021.234.
- Ujayli, Shahla (2022-07-30). "Knowledge and the Discourse Power of the Exile's Writing". Dirasat: Human and Social Sciences. 49 (4): 90–101. doi:10.35516/hum.v49i4.2035. ISSN 2663-6190.

== Literature ==
- "The various representations of the intellectual in Shahla Ujayli's : a sky so close to us (2019)". WorldCat.org.
- Mahfouz, Naghib, et al. 2017. Arab Literary Awards: Naghib Mahfouz, Muhammad Khudayyir, Alaa Khaled, Elias Farkouh, Shahla Ujayli, Mahmoud Saeed, Ashur Etwebi, and Yahya Al-Sheikh. Banipal. London: Banipal Publishing ISBN 9780995636910.
