= Samar Mahfouz Barraj =

Lebanese children's literature writer and translator

- سمر محفوظ براج
- Born: Lebanon
- Education: American University of Beirut
- Occupations: Author, poet, playwright, songwriter, translator
- Writing career
- Language: Arabic, English, Italian, French
- Genre: Children's Literature
- Notable awards: "Kitabi" Arabic Children's Book Prize 2015 "Kitabi" Arabic Children's Book Prize 2018

Samar Mahfouz Barraj (Arabic:سمر محفوظ براج) is an author, poet, playwright, songwriter, trainer, and children's literature translator. A number of her books have been nominated and won prestigious awards from all over the world, including Arabic and regional awards.

== Early life and education ==
Samar Mahfouz Barraj was born and lives in the Republic of Lebanon. She received her teaching diploma in Arabic and Social Studies (Elementary) in 2002 from the American University of Beirut, and a bachelor's degree in Arabic and social sciences from the same university. She also received a bachelor's degree in public administration in 1981 from the American University of Beirut.

== Career ==
In 2007, Barraj wrote her first book I didn't mean it which became the starting point to publishing over 60 books with different publishing houses. Barraj has translated more than 78 books in several languages including Italian, English, and French. The Spanish translation of her book Grandma Will Always Remember Me won the first prize for Children's books in Beirut Arab International Book Fair in 2012.

In 2015 Red Line won the Kitabi Arabic Children's Book Prize organized by the Arab Thought Foundation. Red Line was then translated into Turkish. Red Line was the first of its kind; to raise awareness towards child harassment for children to read in a pleasant and creative way. My Friend won the Kitabi Arabic Children's Book Prize for 2017. How beautiful is sleep! was listed on the IBBY honor list 2014 for the best text category. In 2014, her book Ball…Ball was long-listed for Sheikh Zayed Book Award in the Children's literature category and in 2017 again for her book Al Betaqa Al Ajeeba (The Amazing Card). In addition, four of her books were listed for the Etisalat Award for Arabic Children's Literature. at the Sharjah International Book Fair; Looking for a Hobby in 2010, My Mother and Smoking the following year, When My Friend Got Sick in 2011 which also won the second prize for children's books at Beirut Arab International Book Fair in 2011, and Shadi's Foot which was longlisted for the Etisalat Award for Arabic Children's Literature in 2011.

Barraj was a member of the administrative faculty at the Lebanese American University since 2013, and the Lebanese Board on Books for Young People since 2007, a member of the founding team for Mubadara, an "Initiative to Develop an Arab Child Reader" in 2015. She was the Assistant Arabic Coordinator and Coordinator of Library Activities between 2007 and 2012, and an Arabic and social studies teacher between 2002 and 2007. She hosts writing workshops for adults and children as a trainer on "how to teach Arabic through fun", "how to promote reading stories in Arabic", and "creative writing for children" since 2007.

Barraj has participated in many exhibitions, lectures, and panels including speaking at the International Middle East Symposium on "the role of children literature and education in making a difference" in 2014. She was a guest author at the Emirates Airlines Literature Festival in Dubai, a session entitled "From an Idea to a Story" and a creative writing workshop for children entitled "Children can also write" the same year. In 2013, Barraj was a speaker at the First International Board on Books for Young People Conference for the Region of Central Asia and North Africa (CANA) on the "importance of library activities sessions in promoting reading in schools". In 2012, she was a speaker at both Sharjah Book Fair for Children Books and Abu Dhabi International Book Fair, panel entitled "How to Promote Reading".

== Books ==
Some of her books include:

- New Game, 2007.
- I too want..., 2007.
- I didn't Mean.., 2008.
- A Trip in Koko's Beak, 2008.
- I want a pet, 2008.
- On the beach (Sun Letters), 2009.
- A Rooster is a Chicken...and a Lamb is a Sheep (Male and Female), 2009.
- How tidy is this room! (Demonstrative Pronouns), 2009.
- Orders... Orders (Imperative Verbs), 2009.
- At my Grandpa's at the Mountain (Moon Letters), 2009.
- The Rabbit and the Elephant King, 2009.
- What to Wear? What to Wear? (Adjectives), 2009.
- Looking for a Hobby, 2009.
- I Love to Draw (Progressive Verbs), 2009.
- Goodbye our home... (Past Verbs), 2009.
- Female and Male, 2012
- Shadi's Foot, 2010.
- Enas's Mouth, 2010.
- Our class is better..., 2010.
- By the Candle Light, 2010.
- Naji's Hand, 2010.
- Demonstrative Pronouns, 2011.
- How beautiful is sleep!, 2011.
- Our house is better, 2011.
- My Mother and Smoking, 2011.
- Why Her... Why Him?, 2011.
- Sun and Moon Letters, 2011.
- When My Friend got Sick, 2011.
- Grandma Will Always Remember Me..., 2012.
- My Fairy Tales, 2012.
- Ball... Ball, 2013.
- ...Mama is Sleeping, 2013.
- Ghadry and Rawan, 2013.
- The Amazing Card, 2014.
- Wassim Walks by Himself, 2014.
- Wassim Bathes, 2014.
- Wassim Sleeps by Himself, 2014.
- Wassim Eats by Himself, 2014.
- Red Line, 2014.
- My Friend, 2016.
- This is Not a Toy Dear Wassim, 2016.
- Where Do I Find You?, 2016.
- A Gentle Guest, 2016.
- A Very Strange Night, 2017.
- Alif Ba'a Ya'a, 2017.

== See also ==
- Etel Adnan
- Hoda Barakat
- Maya Zankoul
