= Haji Jaber =

Eritrean literary writer and journalist (* 1976)

- Born: January 1, 1976 (age 49)
- Citizenship: Eritrea
- Occupation: Writer

Haji Jabir (born 1976) is an Eritrean novelist and journalist. He was born in the city of Massawa on the Red Sea coast. Writing in Arabic, he has published five novels as of 2021. With the nomination of Black Foam (2018), Jabir became the first Eritrean novelist to be longlisted for the International Prize for Arabic Fiction.

== Life and career ==
Jaber’s literary work deals with the past and present of Eritrea, its diaspora and the wider Horn of Africa. His novel Black Foam, based on real events, tells the fictional story of a group of Ethiopian Jews, who emigrate to Israel to escape poverty and in search of a better life. In 2023, it was published in an English translation by Sawad Hussain and Marcia Lynx Qualey.

Jaber lives in Doha, Qatar, and works as a journalist for Al Jazeera. He has also taught courses for creative writing at the Al Jazeera Media Institute. In an interview with ArabLit magazine, he said:

I write about the people of my country, because they are a persecuted and suffering people, and so my novels come in this manner. I would like to write far from politics, but I would betray these people if I turned away from their issues. In Eritrea, we are still living outside history, enslaved to an oppressive regime in various forms, and all of this is considered the meaning of “homeland,” which is innocent.

— Haji Jaber, Eritrean writer,

== Works ==
- Samrawit (2012), winner of the Sharjah Award for Arab Creativity in 2012.
- Fatma's Harbour (2013), translated into Italian.
- The Spindle Game (2015), longlisted for the 2016 Sheikh Zayed Book Award .
- Black Foam (2018), winner of the Katara Novel Prize in 2019, and longlisted for the International Prize for Arabic Fiction.
- The Abyssinian Rimbaud (2021).
