= Sdot Micha =

Place in central Israel

Sdot Micha: שדות מיכה (Hebrew); سدوت ميخا (Arabic)
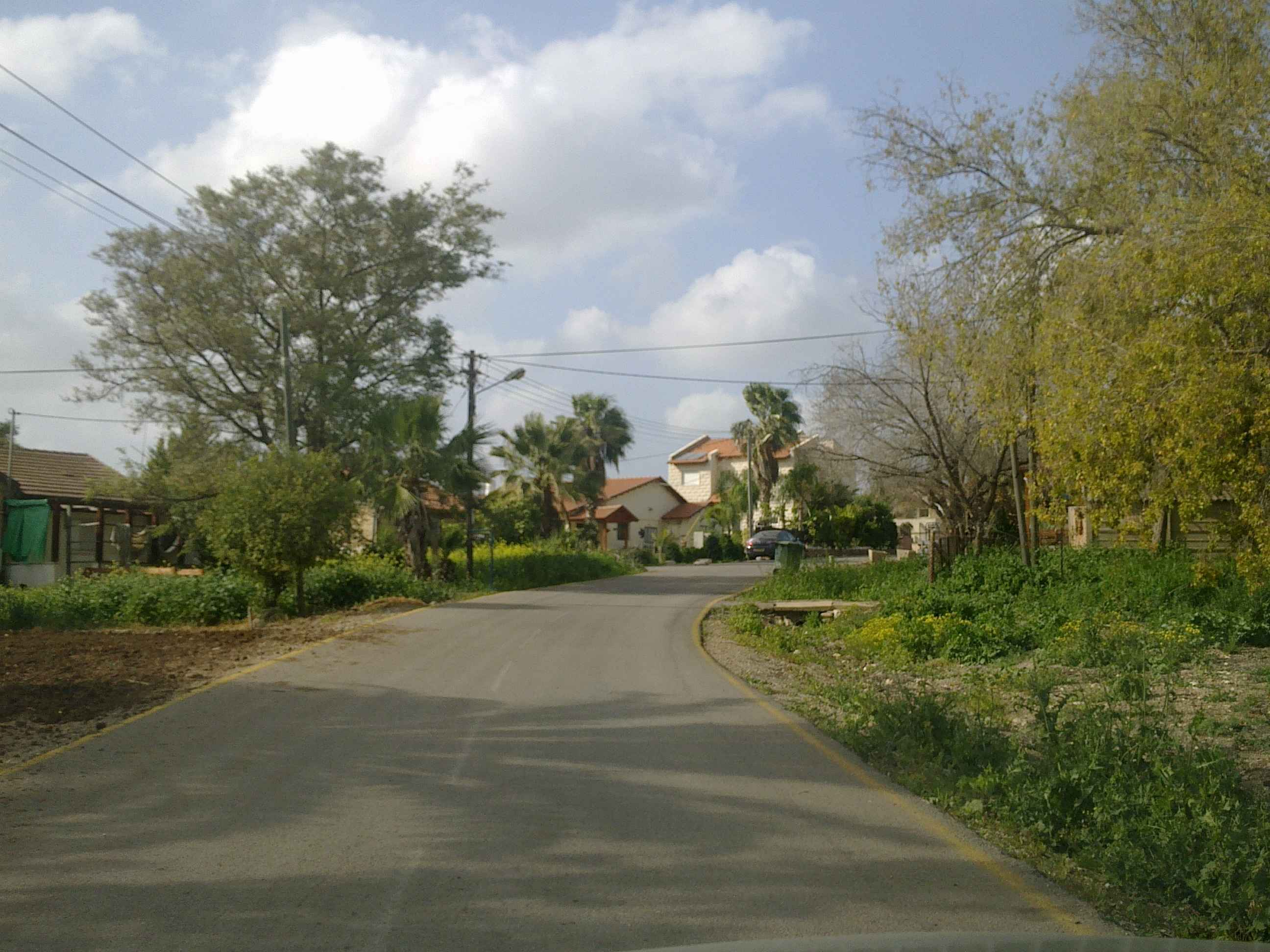

- Location within Jerusalem District Location within Israel
- Coordinates: 31°43′17″N 34°55′15″E
- Country: Israel
- District: Jerusalem
- Council: Mateh Yehuda
- Affiliation: Moshavim Movement
- Founded: 1955
- Founder: Moroccan Jews
- Population (2024): 348

Sdot Micha or Sedot Mikha (Hebrew: שְׂדוֹת מִיכָה, lit. Micah Fields) is a moshav (agricultural settlement) in central Israel. Located to the west of Beit Shemesh, it is under the jurisdiction of the Mateh Yehuda Regional Council. In 2024 it had a population of 348.

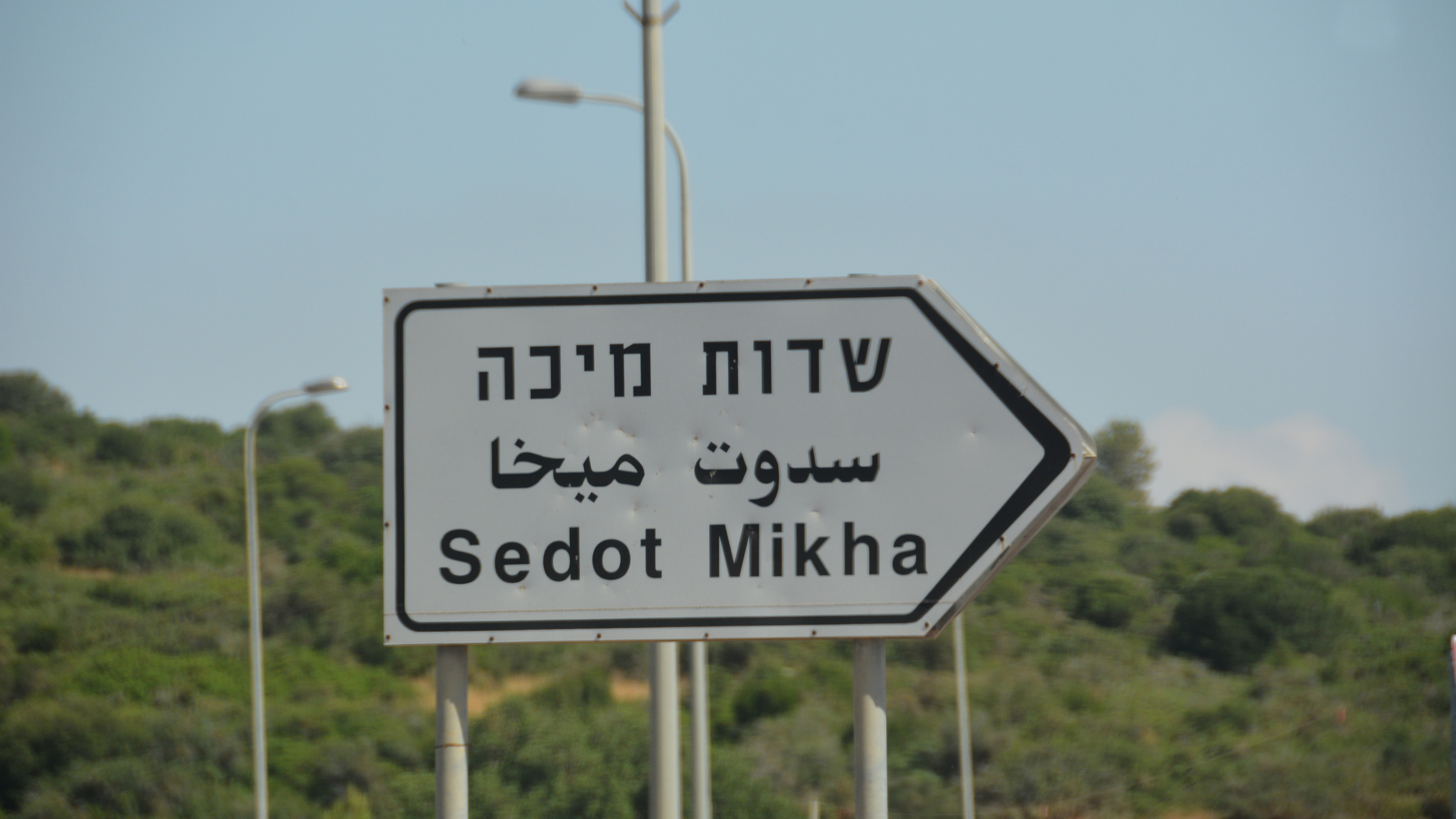
Direction sign of moshav Sdot Micha (Sedot Mikha)

== History ==
The village was established in 1955 by immigrants from Morocco on the former land of the depopulated Arab village of Al-Burayj. It was named after the writer Micha Josef Berdyczewski.

It is near Sdot Micha Airbase, which, according to unofficial sources, houses nuclear weapons and mobile missiles to fire them.
