= Al-Burayj, Jerusalem =

Al-Burayj البريج'
- Etymology: The little tower
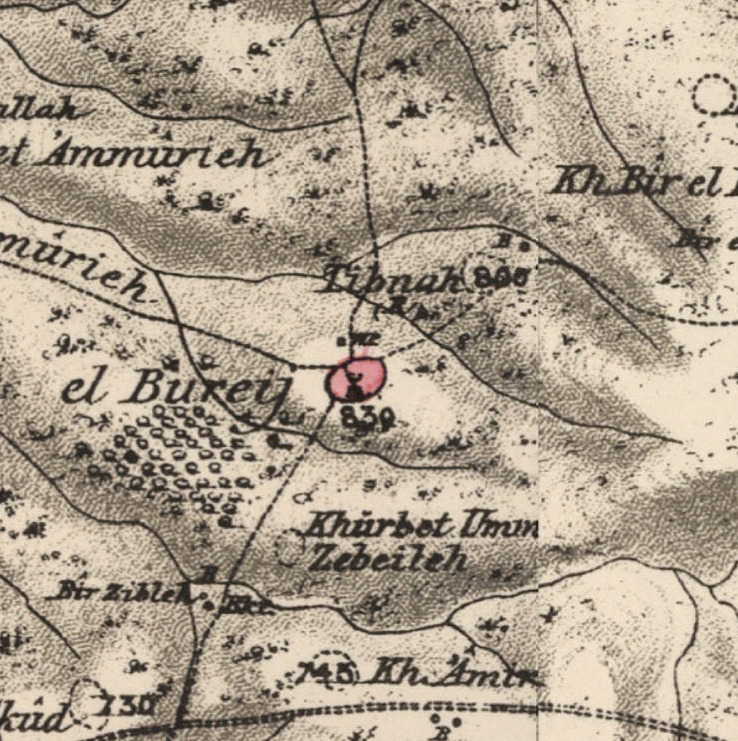
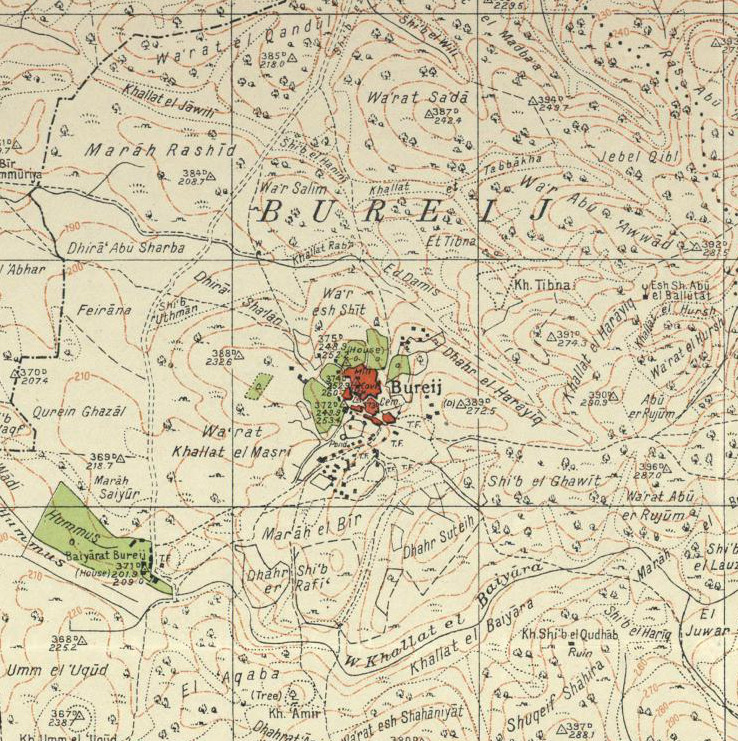
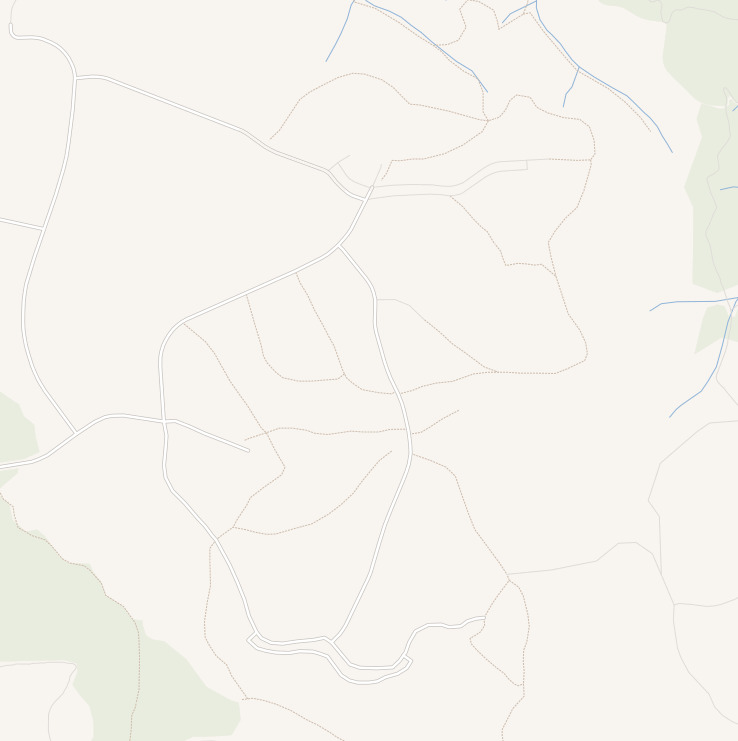
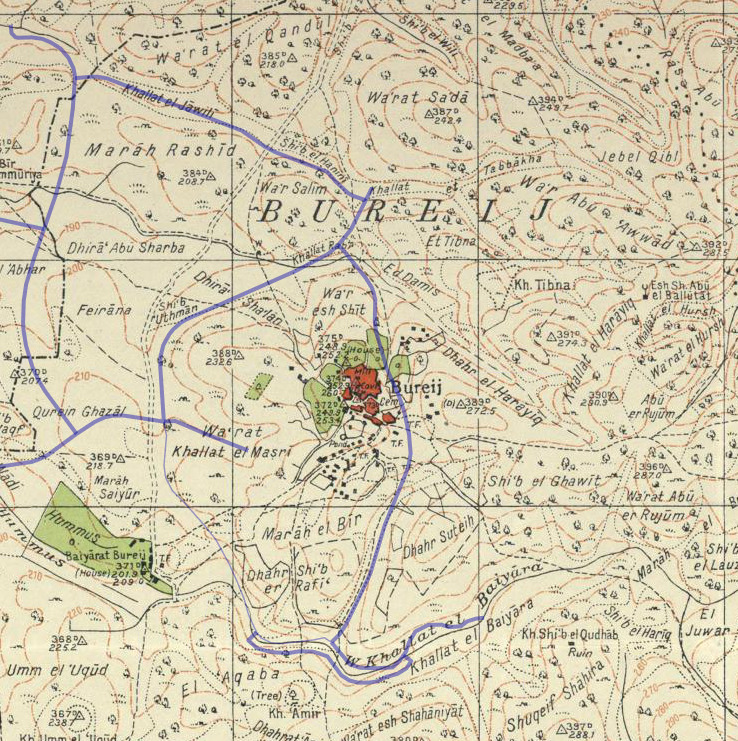
- 1870s map 1940s map modern map 1940s with modern overlay map A series of historical maps of the area around Al-Burayj, Jerusalem (click the buttons)

- Location within Mandatory Palestine
- Coordinates: 31°44′25″N 34°55′52″E
- Palestine grid: 143/127
- Geopolitical entity: Mandatory Palestine
- Subdistrict: Jerusalem
- Date of depopulation: Not known

Area
  - Total: 19,080 dunams (19.08 km^{2}; 7.37 sq mi)

Population (1945)
  - Total: 720
- Current Localities: Sdot MichaSdot Micha Airbase

Al-Burayj or Bureij, lit. 'little tower', was a Palestinian Arab village in the Jerusalem Subdistrict. It was depopulated during the 1948 Arab–Israeli War on October 19, 1948, during the first phase of Operation Ha-Har. The village was located 28.5 km west of Jerusalem.

== History ==
=== Late Ottoman period ===
In 1838 el-Bureij was noted as a Muslim village, located in er-Ramleh district.

In 1863 Victor Guérin noted it as a village of 200 inhabitants. The Sheikh's house was described as "fairly large and fairly constructed"; the others, less so. Tobacco plantations were spread around. He also noted large ancient blocks, which, it was said, originated from Kh[irbet] Tibneh, just to the north.

Socin found from an official Ottoman village list from about 1870 that buredsch had a population of 116 in a total of 41 houses, though that population count included men, only. It was further noted that it was located between Mughallis and Saydun. Hartmann found that el-buredsch had 40 houses.

In 1882, the PEF's Survey of Western Palestine (SWP) described El Bureij as: "A small village on high ground, having a high house or tower in the middle, from which it is named."

=== British Mandate ===
In the 1922 census of Palestine conducted by the British Mandate authorities, Buraij had a population of 398; all Muslims, increasing in the 1931 census to 621; 7 Christians and 614 Muslims, in a total of 132 houses.

In the 1945 statistics, the village had a population of 720; 10 Christians and 710 Muslims, with a total of 19,080 dunums of land. Of this, 31 dunams were for citrus and bananas, 77 were for irrigable land or plantations, 9,426 for cereals, while 14 dunams were built-up (urban) Arab land.

Al-Burayj's had a mosque named al-'Umari Mosque, and it was also home to a Greek Orthodox monastery.

=== 1948, aftermath ===
During Operation Ha-Har, between the 19 and 24 October 1948, the Harel Brigade captured several villages, among them Bureij. The villagers fled, or were expelled eastwards.

Following the war, the area was incorporated into the State of Israel. In 1955 the moshav of Sdot Micha was established on land that had belonged to al-Burayj, south of the village site.

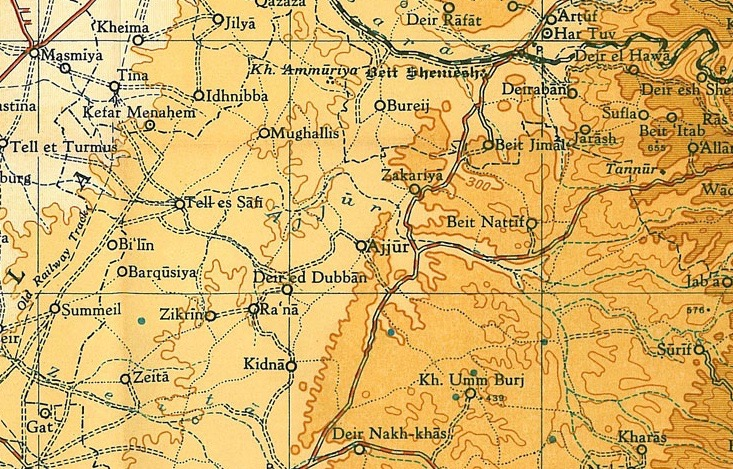
Al-Burayj 1945 1:250,000 (upper centre)

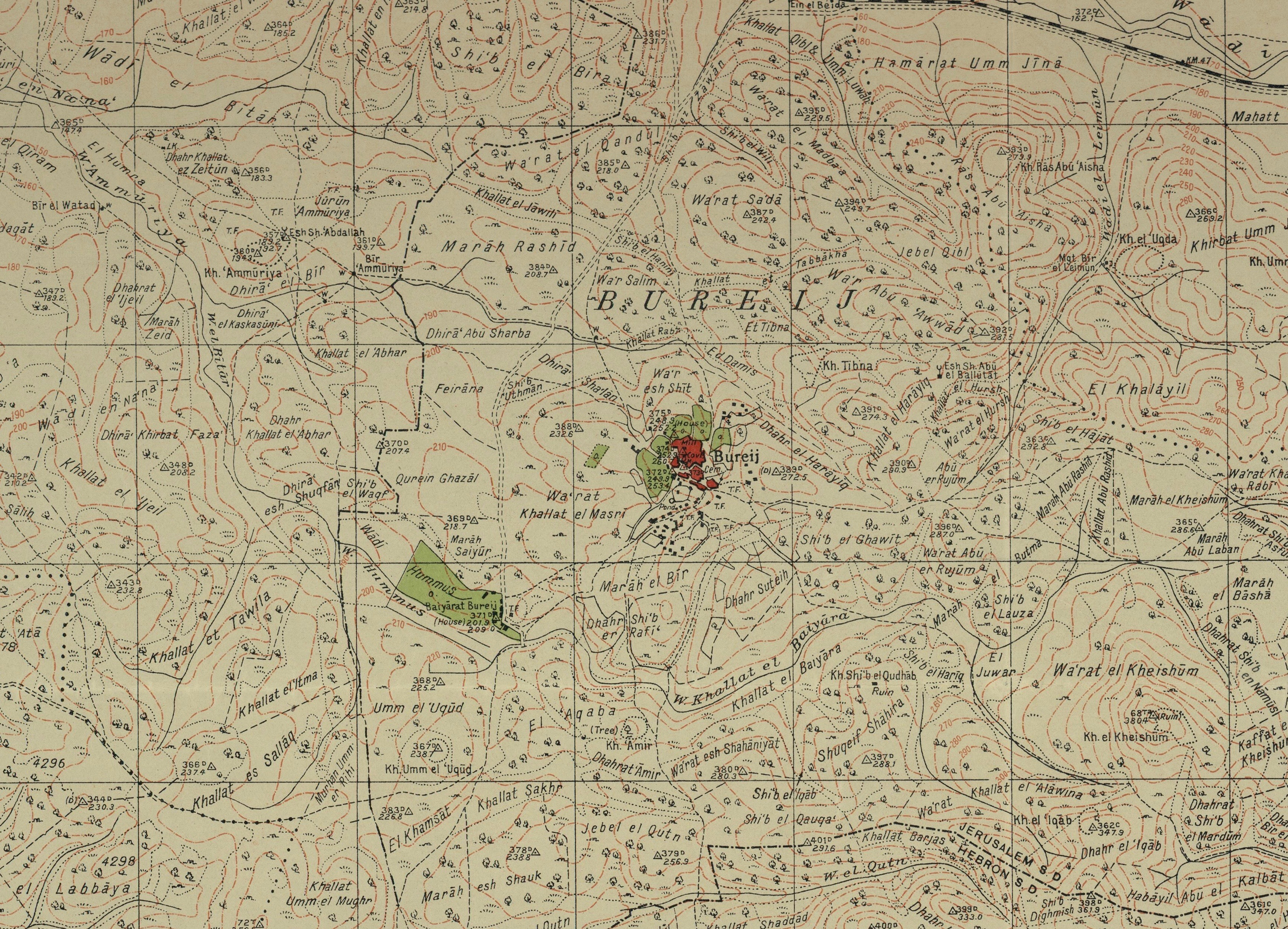
Al-Burayj 1947 1:20,000

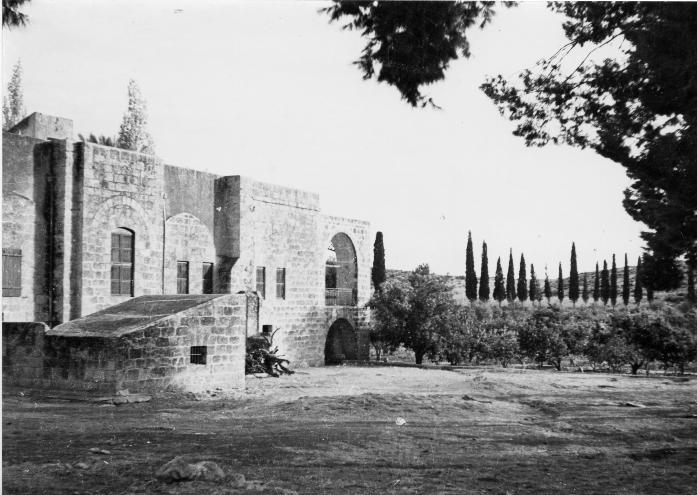
Building in Al-Burayj after capture by Harel Brigade

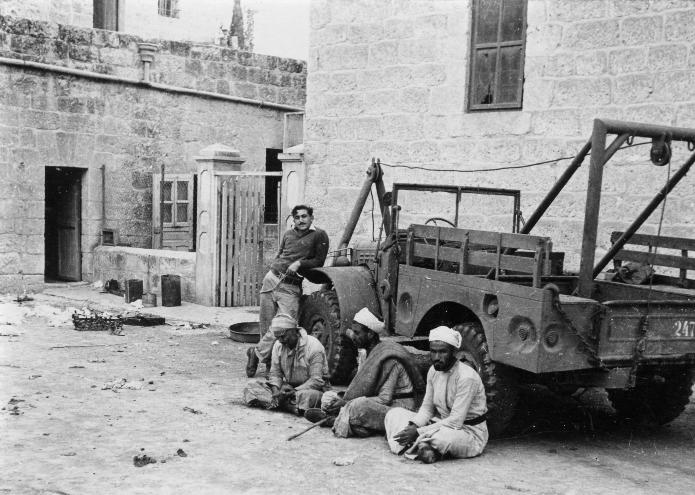
Prisoners waiting to be interrogated, Al-Burayj, 1948

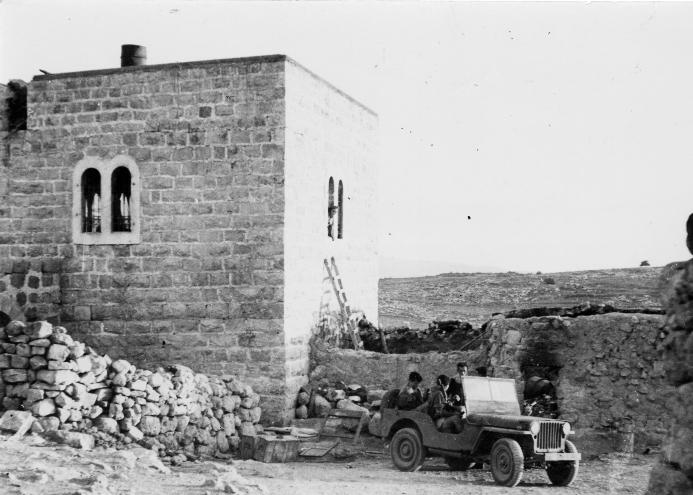
Al-Burayj 1948

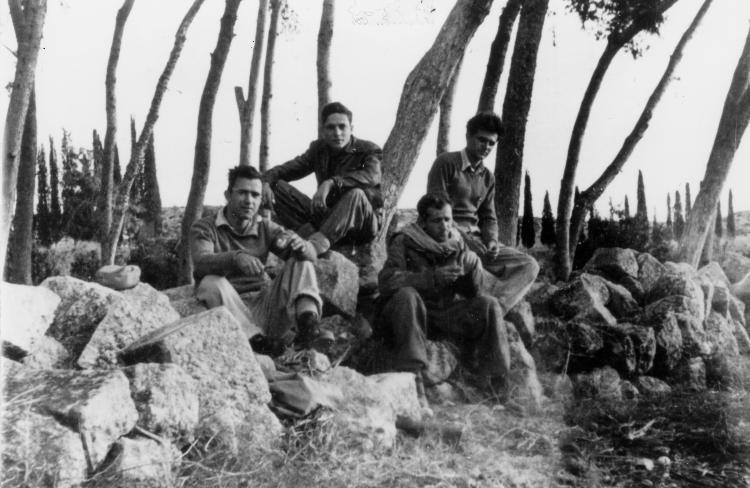
Members of Harel Brigade in Al-Burayj 1948

Large part of the village land is now a military base called Sdot Micha Airbase, which is inaccessible to the public.

== Bibliography ==
- Barron, J. B., ed. (1923). Palestine: Report and General Abstracts of the Census of 1922. Government of Palestine.
- Conder, C.R.; Kitchener, H.H. (1882). The Survey of Western Palestine: Memoirs of the Topography, Orography, Hydrography, and Archaeology. Vol. 2. London: Committee of the Palestine Exploration Fund.
- Department of Statistics (1945). Village Statistics, April, 1945. Government of Palestine.
- Guérin, V. (1869). Description Géographique Historique et Archéologique de la Palestine (in French). Vol. 1: Judee, pt. 2. Paris: L'Imprimerie Nationale.
- Hadawi, S. (1970). Village Statistics of 1945: A Classification of Land and Area ownership in Palestine. Palestine Liberation Organization Research Centre. Archived from the original on 2018-12-08.
- Hartmann, M. (1883). "Die Ortschaftenliste des Liwa Jerusalem in dem türkischen Staatskalender für Syrien auf das Jahr 1288 der Flucht (1871)". Zeitschrift des Deutschen Palästina-Vereins (in German). 6: 102–149.
- Khalidi, W. (1992). All That Remains: The Palestinian Villages Occupied and Depopulated by Israel in 1948. Washington D.C.: Institute for Palestine Studies. ISBN 0-88728-224-5.
- Mills, E., ed. (1932). Census of Palestine 1931. Population of Villages, Towns and Administrative Areas. Jerusalem: Government of Palestine.
- Morris, B. (2004). The Birth of the Palestinian Refugee Problem Revisited. Cambridge University Press. ISBN 978-0-521-00967-6.
- Palmer, E. H. (1881). The Survey of Western Palestine: Arabic and English Name Lists Collected During the Survey by Lieutenants Conder and Kitchener, R. E. Transliterated and Explained by E.H. Palmer. Committee of the Palestine Exploration Fund.
- Robinson, E.; Smith, E. (1841). Biblical Researches in Palestine, Mount Sinai and Arabia Petraea: A Journal of Travels in the year 1838. Vol. 3. Boston: Crocker & Brewster.
- Socin, A. (1879). "Alphabetisches Verzeichniss von Ortschaften des Paschalik Jerusalem". Zeitschrift des Deutschen Palästina-Vereins (in German). 2: 135–163.
