= Ibrahim Nasrallah =

Palestinian writer and poet

- إبراهيم نصر الله
- Ibrahim Nasrallah at the Neustadt Literature Festival, September 29th, 2026.
- Born: 2 December 1954 (age 71); Amman, Jordan
- Education: Amman Training Centre for Teacher Preparation
- Occupations: poet, novelist
- Writing career
- Language: Arabic
- Period: 1978–present
- Genres: Poetry, prose
- Notable works: Prairies of Fever, Time of White Horses, The Spirits of Kilimanjaro
- Notable awards: Neustadt International Prize for Literature (2026); International Prize for Arabic Fiction (2018); Katara Prize for Arabic Novels (2016, 2020); Jerusalem Award for Culture and Creativity (2012)

Ibrahim Nasrallah (Arabic: إبراهيم نصر الله; 2 December 1954) is a Jordan-born Palestinian poet and novelist. He received the Arabic Booker Prize (2018) and the Neustadt International Prize for Literature (2026). Nasrallah was born in 1954 to Palestinian parents who were evicted from their land in Al-Burayj, Jerusalem in 1948.

== Life ==
He spent his childhood and youth in a refugee camp in Jordan, and began his career as a teacher in Saudi Arabia. After returning to Amman, he worked in the media and cultural sectors till 2006 when he dedicated his life to writing. To date, he has published 15 poetry collections, 22 novels, and several other books. In 1985, he started writing the Palestinian Comedy covering 250 years of modern Palestinian history in a series of novels in which each novel is an independent one; to date 13 novels have been published in the framework of this project. Five of his novels and a volume of poetry have been published in English, nine in Persian, four works in Italian, two in Spanish, and one novel in Danish and Turkish.

Nasrallah is also an artist and photographer and has had four solo exhibitions of his photography. He won nine prizes, and his novel Prairies of Fever was chosen by the Guardian newspaper as one of the most important ten novels written by Arabs or non-Arabs about the Arab world. Three of his novels were listed on the International Prize for Arabic Fiction for the years 2009, 2013, and 2014. In 2012 he won the inaugural Jerusalem Award for Culture and Creativity for his literary work. His books are considered one of the most influential and best seller Arabic books, as new editions are released frequently and many young readers are attracted to his books.

In January 2014, he succeeded in summiting Mount Kilimanjaro in a venture that involved two Palestinian adolescents, a boy and a girl, who have lost their legs. The climb was in support to a nongovernmental organization dedicated to providing medical services to Palestinian and Arab children. Nasrallah wrote about this journey in a novel entitled The Spirits of Kilimanjaro (2015). In 2016, Nasrallah was awarded the Katara Prize for Arabic Novels for this work.

His novel The Second Dog War was awarded the International Prize for Arabic Fiction (Arabic Booker) for 2018. In 2020 he became the first Arabic writer to be awarded the "Katara Prize" for Arabic Novels for the second time for his novel "A Tank Under the Christmas Tree".

== Political persecution ==
In June 2006, Nasrallah's fourth collection of poetry Nu’man Yastariddu Lawnahu (Anemone Regains Its Colour) first published in 1984, was suddenly banned in Jordan, while Nasrallah faced charges of insulting the state, inciting dissension and reporting inaccurate information to future generations.

In an interview with The Guardian, Nasrallah commented on the charges he was facing by saying: "I was completely shocked, I did not know how to respond. All I could think of at that moment was that I needed to finish the book I was working on before things got worse. But I was unable to continue writing. I was confused and angry and also afraid."

== Works ==
=== Poetry ===
- Love is Wicked, 2017.
- A Ray of Light Between Two Nights, 2012.
- If I were a maestro, 2009
- Flute Chamber, 2007
- Mirrors of Angels, 2001
- In the Name of the Mother and the Son, 1999. (ISBN 6140100445, Arab Scientific Publishers, 128 pages, 2010)
- The Book of Death and the Dead, 1998
- Verandahs of Autumn, 1997.
- Volume of Poetic Collection (1980-1993), 1994
- The Fox’s Scandal, 1993 (Published in English).
- Green Wood, 1991
- Storms of the Heart, 1989
- The River Boy and the General, 1987
- The Last Dialogue a Few Minutes Before the Killing of the Sparrow, 1984
- No’man Recovers His Color, 1984
- Morning Songs, 1984
- The Rain Inside, 1982 (ISBN 1931896526, Curbstone Books, 126 pages, 2009)
- Horses are Overlooking the City, 1980

=== Novels ===
- Prairies of Fever, Arabic edition 1985; English edition by Interlink 1993 (ISBN 156656106X), Italian edition by Edizioni Lavoro 2001, Hebrow edition by Hed Arzi in 2001, and Danish edition by Underskoven in 2006
- Terrestrial Waves, 1988
- The Barking Dog (Aw), 1990
- Just the Two of Us, Arabic edition 1992, Italian edition by Ilisso under the title Dentro la notte 2004, and English edition under the title Inside the Night (ISBN 9774160975) by The American University in Cairo Press, 2007
- The Guard of the Lost city, 1998
- Balcony of Delirium, 2005
- Balcony of Snow Man 2009
- Balcony of Disgrace 2010
- Balcony of Abyss 2013
- Balcony of Paradise 2014
- The Second Dog War 2016
- "Short Story Writer's Tragedy" 2021

=== Palestinian comedy covering 250 years of modern Palestinian history (12 novels) ===
- Birds of Caution, 1996.
- Eraser Child, 2000.
- Olive Trees of The Streets, 2002.
- Safe Weddings, 2004. (ISBN 9953876258, Arab Scientific Publishers, 2009)
- Under the Midmorning Sun, 2004. (English ISBN 9953-87-626-6, Arab Scientific Publishers, 2009)
- Time of White Horses, 2007. Shortlisted for the International Prize for Arabic Fiction, ISBN 977-416-489-X, Nancy Roberts (translator), American University in Cairo Press (Publisher), 512 pages
- Lanterns of The King of Galilee, 2012.
- Spirits of Kilimanjaro, 2015. 4 Arabic editions.
- Bells Trilogy: Keys' Shadows, An Autobiography of an Eye, A Tank Under the Christmas Tree, 2019.
- My Childhood So Far, 2022

=== Poetry for children ===
- Good Morning Children, 1983.
- Good Things Called Home, 1984.

As a writer and editor he has also published literary works about other Arab writers and poets which include:

- The Book of Writing: That is Life…That is Color (Testimonies about Writing), . Author. 2018
- The Flying Autobiography; Less than an Enemy. More than a Friend. Author. 2006
- The Defeat of the Victors: The Cinema between Creativity and Market Demand. Author. 2000
- Portraits of Being: Cinematic Reflections, 2010.. Author. 2000
- The Art and the Artist: Jabra Ibrahim Jabra’s writings about fine art (editor) 2000.
- The Complete Poetry Collection of The Palestinian Poet Ahmad Hilmi Abdul-Baqui, (Researcher and Editor), 2002.

Nasrallah is a regular contributor to several to the main newspapers in the Arab world. He is also a painter and photographer. He has contributed to several exhibitions and had his own photography shows entitled The Autobiography of an Eye in 1996, and Under Two Suns: Images and Words in 2004, The Life of the Dead Sea a participation at the fifth Gwangju Biennale – South Korea 2004. Many academic theses handled his poetry and novels. The following dealt exclusively with his works: Nasrallah also had poetry reading at several cultural centers in metropolitan cities such as Paris, Rome, Venice, Frankfurt, Berlin, and cities in England Denmark, Switzerland and the United States of America ...., not to mention numerous literary activities in almost all Arabic capitals. Nasrallah also gave lectures and poetry readings at many of the local Jordanian universities as well Arabs and European universities. His work has attracted attention among critics and international academia with 10 books of literary criticism, 15 PhD dissertations, and around 45 master's theses studying his work.

== Awards ==
- 1994 - Tayseer Sbool prize for his novels
- 1997 - Sultan Owais Literary Award for Poetry, a prize for Arab language poets
- 2012 - Jerusalem Award for Culture and Creativity for his literary work
- 2016 - Katara Prize for Arabic Novels for his novel The Spirits of Kilimanjaro
- 2020 - Katara Prize for Arabic Novels for his novel A Tank Under the Christmas Tree
- 2018 - International Prize for Arabic Fiction for his novel The Second Dog War
- 2026 - Neustadt International Prize for Literature
- Arar Literary Award, for Jordanian and Arab poets, Jordan, 1991
- Three awards from the Jordanian Writers Association for the best volume of poetry
