= Lubna Taha =

Illustrator, writer, and designer

- Born: Ramallah, Palestine
- Occupations: Writer, graphic designer, and illustrator of children's stories
- Notable work: Mama Bint Safi, S and L
- Spouse: Anas Abu Rahma
- Awards: Etisalat Award for Arabic Children's Literature; Prize of the Palestinian Ministry of Culture; Abdul Hameed Shoman Foundation Prize

Lubna Hamdan Taha is an illustrator, writer, and designer of Palestinian children's stories. She created several drawings for children's books with Arab publishing houses, including Al-Ahlia House for Publishing and Distribution in Amman, Jordan. She won the Etisalat Award for children's book for her 2018 book, Mama Bint Safi.

== Career ==
Lubna Taha's drawings are distinguished by the abundance of decorations and the use of pencils and wood colors. She has worked with children and teachers in libraries and schools to use children's literature in educational contexts.

Taha published her first work, Mama Bint Safi, a simplified novel for children, in Amman, Jordan in 2018. She lives in Ramallah, Palestine, and is married to poet and children's author Anas Abu Rahma.

== Works ==
Implemented and designed graphics for several children's stories, including:

• (2019), "Kissa An Sa Wa L" (A story about S.L": "Anas Abu Rahma,): Tamer Institute for Community Education.

• (2019), "Bikuli Alhub Min Kalbi" (With all the love from my heart), book written by Anas Abu Rahma, "Palestine Writing Workshop" .

• (2018), "Mama Bint Safi": Lubna Taha, illustrations: Maya Fidawi, Dar Al Salwa, Amman / Jordan.

• (2018), "Yadan Min Aljannah" (Hands from Heaven): Amal Nasser, Dar Al Banan.

• (2019), "Yalla..!": Arwa Khamis, Arwa Arabic Publications.

• (2017), "Almuttaham Faar" (The accused is a rat): Samah Abu Bakr, Asala for Publishing and Distribution.

• (2016), "Nasaih Gair Muhimma Lil Qareh Alsageer" (Unimportant Advice for the Young Reader): Anas Abu Rahma, about the Tamer Foundation for Community Education.

• (2014), "Afkaar Fi Alharra Wa Aldar" (Ideas for the neighborhood and home), Tamer Foundation for Community Education.

• (2014), "Muthakkirat Atfal Albahar" (Memoirs of the Children of the Sea), Tamer Foundation for Community Education.

• (2014), "Heena Yaood Abi" (When My Father Returns) by Maya Abu Al-Hayat, Asala for Publishing and Distribution.

• (2014), "Diwan Kaws Kuzah" (The Rainbow Diwan): Rose Shomali Musleh, Beit Sahour.

• (2013), "Rahalat Ajeeba Fi Albilad Algareeba" (Wonderful Journeys in Strange Lands): Sonia Nemer, about the Tamer Institute for Community Education.

• (2013), "Ashjar Lil Nas Algaibeen" (Trees for the Absentee People): Ahlam Bisharat, on the authority of the Tamer Institute for Community Education.

• (2012), "Namula": Zakaria Muhammad, Tamer Institute for Community Education.

• (2011), "Kissah Kabla Alnawm" (A Bedtime Story): Maya Abu Al Hayat, Tamer Institute for Community Education.

• (2011), "Ugniyat Albier" (Song of the Well): Anas Abu Rahma, for the Tamer Institute for Community Education.

== Awards ==
She has won several awards, including:

- Prize of the Palestinian Ministry of Culture
- Abdul Hameed Shoman Foundation Prize
- 2018 Etisalat Award for Arabic Children's Literature, in the writing category for the story "Mama Bint My Class"
- 2019 Etisalat Award for Arabic Children's Literature, in the category of the best children's book for S and L, written by Anas Abu Rahma and illustrated by Taha
