= Maria Dadouch =

Syrian novelist and writer

- Born: 1970 (age 55–56); Damascus, Syria
- Education: University of California, Los Angeles
- Occupations: writer, novelist
- Writing career
- Period: 2005-present
- Genres: Arabic adult and children's literature
- Notable work: The Planet of Uncertainties
- Notable awards: Katara Prize for Arabic Novel, Shoman Prize for Science Fiction, Arab Publishers Forum Prize, Arab Publishers Forum Prize

Maria Dadouch (Arabic: ماريا دعدوش; born 1970 in Damascus, Syria) is a Syrian literary writer, screenwriter and novelist. She has written both Arabic adult novels as well as numerous books for children. Her work has been honored with several awards for Arabic literature, including the Katara Prize for young adult novels. Some of her books, such as Omar and Oliver and The Fly Over the Pond, have been published in English.

== Life and career ==
Dadouch graduated from the University of California in Los Angeles (ULSC) earning a degree in Creative Writing in 2015. In the beginning of her career, Dadouch had helped in establishing Fulla teenage magazine in 2005, for which she wrote articles and stories. She also wrote for the TV Arabic comedy series Maraya.

Dadouch moved to the United States when the war in Syria started in 2011. Since 2015, she has published both novels for adults as well as numerous books for children, some of which were translated into English.

In 2017, arts organization Art OMI invited her for their writing residency. Dadouch has also served as an instructor in creative writing courses, sponsored, for example, by the Emirates Airlines Festival of Literature and the Arabic MOOC website Edraak. For the Edtech company Asafeer, which produced open-access STEM-themed illustrated Ebooks for Arab children and schools, Dadouch created a creative writing program. Twenty-four mainly women authors taking part in this program wrote 100 storybooks for the Global Digital Library's No Lost Generation prize.

== Works ==
=== Novels ===
- The Syrian Refugee Crisis: A Mug With a Lid, English original, 2015
- The Bad White (original title: Al Zeft Al Abyad), 2019
- The Planet of Uncertainties (original title: Kawkab Al La Maqoul), 2019
- I Want Golden Eyes (original title: Ureed Ayunan Thahabiya), 2019
- The Heart Which Is Totally Behind the Rib (original title: Al Qalb Al Lathi Khalfa Al Deel' Tamaman), 2020

=== Children's books ===
- The Puzzle of the Wooden Door (original title: Lugz Al Bab Al Khashabi), 2016
- The Secret of the Magical Growth (original title: Ser Al Numu Al Sehri), 2017
- I Want Another Mum (original title: Ureed Uman Othra), 2017
- SemSem Dot Com, 2018
- Karma Karamila – Who Took My Apricot Pen? (original title: Karma Karamila – Man Akhatha Qalami Al Meshmeshi?), 2018
- Me and Him (original title: Ana wa Howa), 2018
- Karma Karamila – The Girl of the Golden Lira (original title: Karma Karamila – Fatat Al Leera Al Thahabia), 2018
- Karma Karamila – A Big Problem (original title: Karma Karmila – Mushkeela Kabeera), 2018
- Do You Like the Scheme With the Narwhal (original title: Hal Yarooq Laka Al Mukhatat Ma'a Al Muraqat?), 2018
- Karma Karamila – I Don't Want to Go to the Pool (original title: Karma Karamila – La Ureed Al Thahab Ela Al Masbah), 2019
- One Evaporated ... Two You Are a Princess (original title: Wahad Tabkhera ... Ethnan Anti Ameera), 2019
- What Do Is Yasser Hiding? (original title: Matha Yukhfi Yasser?", 2020
- Omar and Oliver (original title: Omar wa Oliver)
- Gad and the Magic Grape Seed (original title: Gad Wa Buthoor Al Enab Al Seheria)
- The Diary of a Martian Boy (original title: Muthakarat Fata Mareekhi)
- Zakadam Can't Dance (original title: Zakadam La Youmkenuhu Al Raqs)
- Standing Hairdos Island (original title: Jazeerat Al Tasreehat Al Waqeefa)
- Mama Bot's Private Time (original title: Waqat Mama Bot Al Khas)
- The Shuttle of Eternal Youth (original title: Mukawak Al Shabab Al Daeem)
- The Adventure of a Frog who Was a Prince (original title: Muqaamart Deefdaa Kana Ameeran)
- A Mug With A Lid: Syrians and the Sea, 2015
- A Fly Over a Pond

== Awards ==
Dadouch has been honored with several awards:

- 2018: the Katara Prize for Arabic Novel for her book "The Planet of Uncertainties".
- 2019: the Shoman Prize for Science Fiction for her novel "I Want Golden Eyes"
- 2020: the Khalifa Award for Education for her novel "The Heart is Right Behind the Rib".
- 2020: the Arab Publishers Forum Prize for her book "I and Him".
- 2021: Etisalat Award for Arabic Children's Literature for her picture book My Pants are short on me

== See also ==
- Taghreed Al Najjar
- Eman Al Yousuf
- Huda Hamed
