= Ibtisam Barakat =

Palestinian-American author, poet, artist, translator, and educator

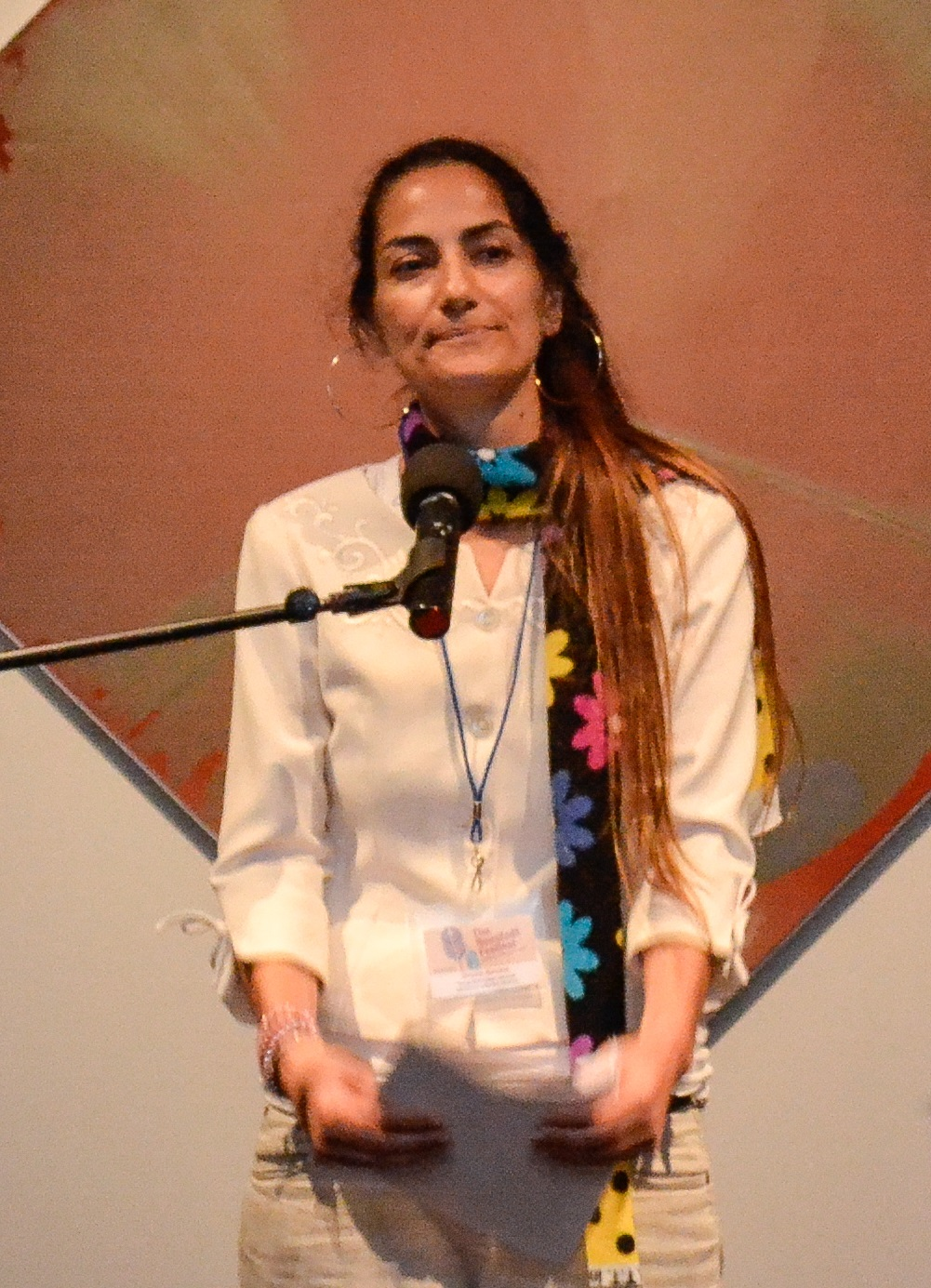
- Barakat at the festival of the Neustadt International Prize for Literature 2013
- Born: Ibtisam Barakat; October 2, 1963 (age 63); East Jerusalem
- Occupations: Author, poet, artist, translator, Educator

Ibtisam Barakat (Arabic: ابتسام بركات) is a Palestinian-American bilingual author, poet, artist, translator, and educator. She was born in Beit Hanina-East Jerusalem. Barakat received her bachelor's degree from Bir Zeit University, near Ramallah in the West Bank. In 1986, she moved to New York City, where she interned with The Nation magazine. She went on to earn a master's degree in journalism and another master's degree in human development and family studies from the University of Missouri.

== Bibliography ==
=== What a Song Can Do: 12 Riffs on the Power of Music (2004) ===
Barakat contributed to this anthology that "explores the powerful impact that music has in our lives." The anthology was published June 8, 2004, by Knopf Books for Young Readers. Other contributors include Jennifer Armstrong, Ron Koertge, Joseph Bruchac, David Levithan, Jude Mandell, J. Alison James, and Sarah Ellis.

=== Tasting the Sky: A Palestinian Childhood (2007) ===
Tasting the Sky: A Palestinian Childhood was published February 20, 2007, by Farrar, Straus, and Giroux.

The memoir is about growing up under Israeli occupation following the 1967 Six-Day War and the persistence and resistance of the Palestinian struggle for liberation.

Tasting the Sky received the following accolades:

- Dorothy Canfield Fischer Children's Book Nominee (2009)
- International Reading Association's Best Nonfiction for Young Adults (2008)
- Arab American Book Award in the Children/ Young Adult Category (2008)
- Middle East Council Best Literature Book Award (2007)

=== Free?: Stories About Human Rights (2010) ===
Barakat contributed to this anthology that explores the concept of freedom. Free? was published April 27, 2020, by Candlewick. Other contributors include David Almond, Margaret Mahy, Meja Mwangi, Jamila Gavin, Eoin Colfer, Michael Morpurgo, Theresa Breslin, and Sarah Mussi.

=== Al Ta' Al Marbouta Tateer (2011) ===
Al Ta' Al Marbouta Tateer, التاء المربوطة تطير, translated as The Letter Ta Escapes or The Taa' That Flies, is about a letter in the Arabic alphabet that refuses to do what it is supposed to do in a word.

The book won the Anna Lindh Foundation award for Best Literature for Arabic children.

=== Hadeyyah Lel-Hamzah (2014) ===
Hadeyyah Lel-Hamzah, هدية للهمزة, translated as A Present for the Letter Hamzah, which Barakat wrote and illustrated, was published by The National Library of the United Arab Emirates - Abu Dhabi.

=== Balcony on the Moon (2016) ===
Balcony on the Moon: Coming of Age in Palestine was published October 15, 2016, by Farrar, Straus and Giroux. In 2017, the book was nominated for the Arab American Book Award for Children's/Young Adult Literature.

The book also received the following accolades:

- Junior Library Guild Selection
- Palestine Book Award Shortlist Selection
- VOYA Nonfiction Honor Roll Selection
- Skipping Stones Honor Book
- Arab-American National Museum Honor Book
- Bank Street College of Education Best Book
- American Library Association/Amelia Bloomer Project Top Ten Book
- Notable Book for a Global Society
- News & Observer Newspaper's Wilde Best Book Award Winner
- Middle East Book Award Honorable Mention

=== The Jar that Became a Galaxy (2019) ===
The Jar that Became a Galaxy الجرة التي صارت مجرة was published by Tamer Institute in Ramallah, Palestine, and illustrated by Walid Taher. The book gave the national reading campaign in Palestine its title.

=== The Lilac Girl ===
The Lilac Girl, published by Tamer Institute, won the prestigious Sheikh Zayed Book Award.

Books

- Tasting The Sky (2007)
- Savoring the sky (2010)
- Balcony on the Moon: Coming of Age in Palestine (2016)
- Two Homes in Omar's Heart - Spanish (2022)
