= Eman Al Yousuf =

Emirati writer

- Born: 1987 (age 38–39); United Arab Emirates
- Education: MA in Knowledge Management, American University in the Emirates
- Occupations: writer, novelist
- Writing career
- Language: Arabic
- Genres: Short stories, novels
- Notable awards: The Emirates Novel Award, 2016

Eman Al Yousuf (Arabic: إيمان اليوسف) is an Emirati writer who was born in the United Arab Emirates in 1987. She has published three novels "the Window Which Saw", "Guard the Sun", "The Resurrection of Others" and three short stories including "A Bird in a Fish Tank" and "Many Faces of a Man. In 2015, her novel "Guard of the Sun" won the 2016 Emirates Novel Award and was translated into seven languages. She is the first Emirati woman to attend for the prestigious Program of International Writers at the University of Iowa. Eman is also a regular columnist in Emirati print media and the writer of the feminist short film "Ghafa".

== Biography ==
Eman Al Yousuf is a chemical engineer and a certified coach in graphology who graduated from the American University of Sharjah. In 2017, she earned a diploma in Cultural Diplomacy from Berlin and recently obtained her master's degree in Knowledge Management from the American University in the Emirates. Al Yousuf published three novels and four short stories. Her novel "The Guard of the Sun", which was published in 2015, won the 2016 Emirates Novel Award. She also published in 2015 a literary interviews "Bread and Ink" with female Emirati writers. She is known as the first Emirati ever to write a feminist short film "Ghafa" which was directed by Aisha Alzaabi and was screened at the 2017 Dubai International Film Festival. She is the first Emirati who was chosen for the International Writing Program of the University of Iowa in the United States. Her play "The Teapot and I" was the UAE submission at the fifth Gulf Festival for Art and Literature and was made into a play. Eman Al Yousuf has a monthly literary column in Emirates Culture Magazine called "Under the Ink" and a weekly column named "Woman of the Pen" in the Emirati newspaper "Al Ru'ya". Over the past few years, she has participated in many cultural events and festivals such as the Emirates Airline Festival of Literature and has represented the UAE in several countries including Spain, Paris, Cairo, U.S., Berlin, etc.

== Novels ==
- The Window Which Saw (Original title: Al Nafitha Allati Absarat), 2014
- Guard of the Sun (Original title: Haris Al Shams)
- The Resurrection of Others (Original title: Qiamat Al Akhareen)

== Short stories ==
- Many Faces of a Man (Original title: Wijooh Insan), 2014
- A Bird in a Fish Tank (Original title: Ta'er fi Haowth Alasamk), 2015
- Eggs Sunny Side up (Original title: Baidh Aoyoon)
- The Tea and I

== Short film ==
- Ghafa, 2017

== Awards ==
- 2016: She won the Emirates Novel Award.

== See also ==
- Taghreed Najjar
- Maria Dadouch
- Huda Hamad
