= Islamic literature =

Literature with influences based on Islamic religion

Islamic literature is literature written by Muslim people, influenced by an Islamic cultural perspective, or literature that portrays Islam. It can be written in any language and portray any country or region. It includes many literary forms including adabs, a non-fiction form of Islamic advice literature, and various fictional literary genres.

== Definition ==
The definition of Islamic literature is a matter of debate, with some definitions categorizing anything written in a majority-Muslim nation as "Islamic" so long as the work can be appropriated into an Islamic framework, even if the work is not authored by a Muslim. By this definition, categories like Indonesian literature, Somali literature, Pakistani literature, and Persian literature would all qualify as Islamic literature. A second definition focuses on all works authored by Muslims, regardless of the religious content or lack thereof within those works. Proponents of the second definition suggest that the Islamic identity of Muslim authors cannot be divorced from the evaluation of their works, even if they did not intend to infuse their works with religious meaning. Still other definitions emphasize works with a focus on Islamic values, or those that focus on events, people, and places mentioned in the Quran and hadith. An alternate definition states that Islamic literature is any literature about Muslims and their pious deeds.

Some academics have moved beyond evaluations of differences between Islamic and non-Islamic literature to studies such as comparisons of the novelization of various contemporary Islamic literatures and points of confluence with political themes, such as nationalism.

== Statistics ==
Over the centuries, there have been numerous bibliographies and biographical dictionaries attempting to list authors of Islamic literature, including India-born scholar Maulana Mahmud Hasan Khan of Rajasthan, who died in 1946 and whose 60-volume M'ojam-ul-Musannifin (Dictionary of Authors) in Arabic provides the biographical sketches of some 40,000 writers from all over the Islamic world.

== Genres ==
=== Fiction ===
Among the best known works of fiction from the Islamic world is The Book of One Thousand and One Nights (Arabian Nights), a compilation of many earlier folk tales set in a frame story of being told serially by the Persian Queen Scheherazade. The compilation took form in the 10th century and reached its final form by the 14th century; the number and type of tales have varied from one manuscript to another. Many other Arabian fantasy tales were often called "Arabian Nights" when translated into English, regardless of whether they appeared in any version of The Book of One Thousand and One Nights or not, and a number of tales are known in Europe as "Arabian Nights", despite existing in no Arabic manuscript.

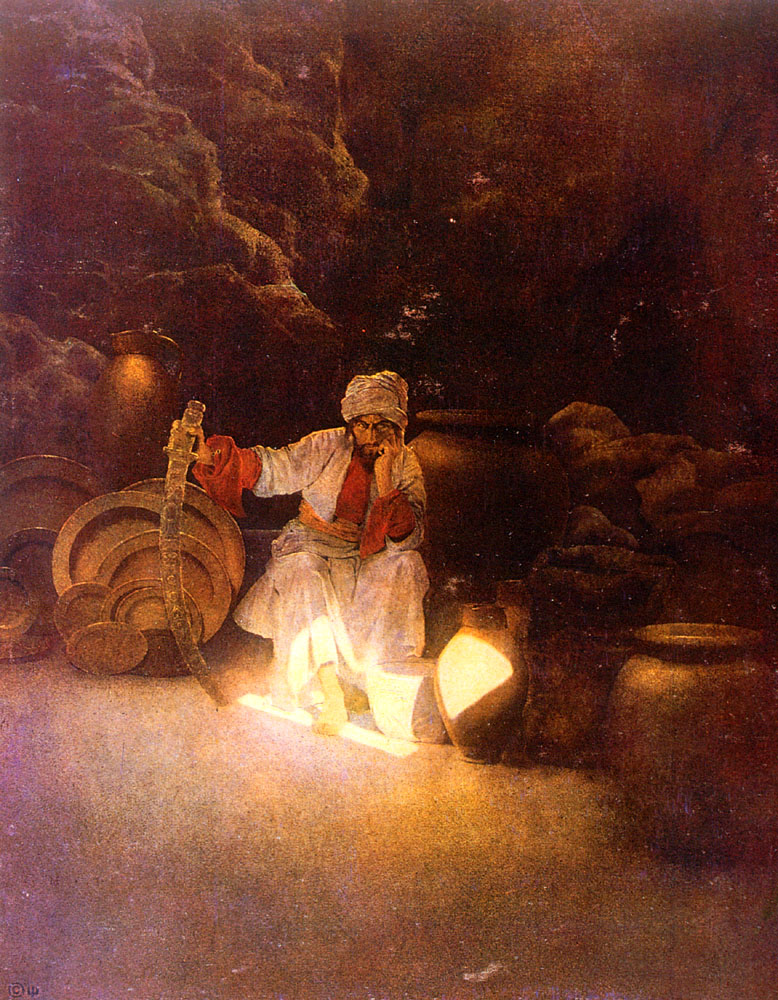
"Ali Baba" by Maxfield Parrish.

This compilation has been influential in the West since it was first translated by Antoine Galland in the 18th century. Many imitations were written, especially in France.

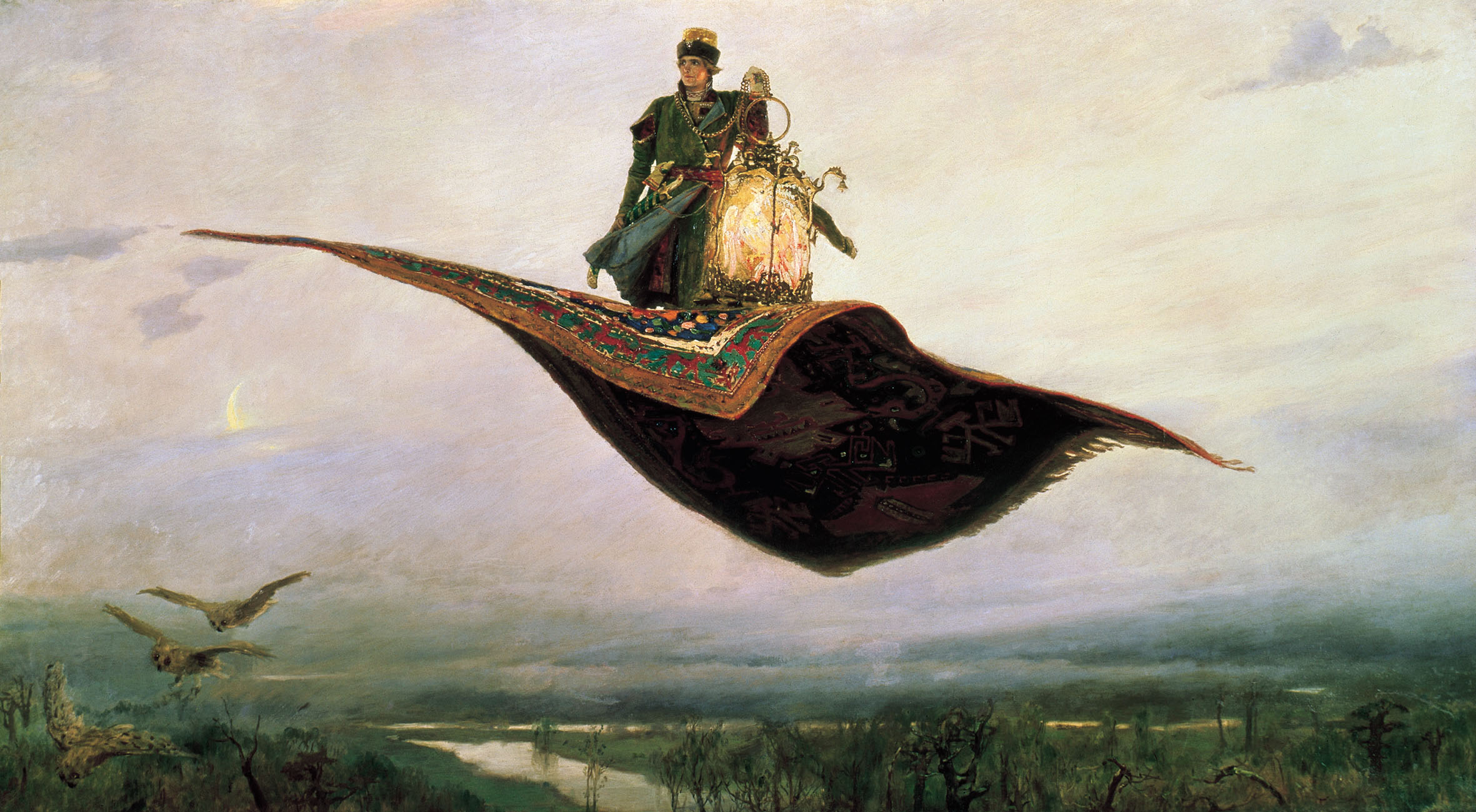
A magic carpet, which can be used to transport its passengers quickly or instantaneously to their destination.

In the 12th century, Ibn Tufail wrote the novel Hayy ibn Yaqdhan, or Philosophus Autodidactus (The Self-Taught Philosopher), as a response to al-Ghazali's The Incoherence of the Philosophers. The novel, which features a protagonist who has been spontaneously generated on an island, demonstrates the harmony of religion and philosophy and the virtues of an inquiring soul. In the same century, Ibn al-Nafis wrote the novel Theologus Autodidactus (The Self-Taught Theologian) in response to Ibn Tufail’s work; the novel is a defense of the rationality of prophetic revelation. The protagonists of both these narratives were feral children (Hayy in Hayy ibn Yaqdhan and Kamil in Theologus Autodidactus) who were autodidactic (self-taught) and living in seclusion on a desert island. A Latin translation of Philosophus Autodidactus first appeared in 1671, prepared by Edward Pococke the Younger, followed by an English translation by Simon Ockley in 1708, as well as German and Dutch translations. Robert Boyle's own philosophical novel set on an island, The Aspiring Naturalist, may have been inspired by the work.

Beginning in the 19th century, fictional novels and short stories became popular within the literary circles of the Ottoman Empire. An early example, the romance novel Taaşuk-u Tal'at ve Fitnat (تعشق طلعت و فطنت; "Tal'at and Fitnat in Love"), was published in 1872 by Şemsettin Sami. Other important novels of the period included Muhayyelât by Ali Aziz Efendi, which consists of three parts and was written in a laconical style contrasting with its content, where djinns and fairies surge from within contexts drawn from ordinary real life situations. Inspired by a much older story written both in Arabic and Assyrian, the author also displays in his work his deep knowledge of sufism, hurufism and Bektashi traditions. Muhayyelât is considered to be an early precursor of the new Turkish literature to emerge in the Tanzimat period of the 19th century.

=== Poetry ===
Cultural Muslim poetry is influenced by both Islamic metaphors and local poetic forms of various regions including the Arabic tradition of Qasida actually beginning since ancient pre-Islamic times. Some Sufi traditions are known for their devotional poetry. Arab poetry influenced the rest of Muslim poetry world over. Likewise Persian poetry too shared its influences beyond borders of modern-day Iran particularly in south Asian languages like Urdu Bengali etc.. Genres present in classical Persian poetry vary and are determined by rhyme, which consists of a vowel followed by a single-rhyming letter. The most common form of Persian poetry comes in the ghazal, a love-themed short poem made of seven to twelve verses and composed in the monorhyme scheme. Urdu poetry is known for its richness, multiple genres, traditions of live public performances through Mushairas, Qawwali and Ghazal singing in modern times.

Ferdowsi's Shahnameh, the national epic poem of Iran, is a mythical and heroic retelling of Persian history. Amir Arsalan was also a popular mythical Persian story.

Beginning in the 15th century Bengali poetry, originating depicts the themes of internal conflict with the nafs, Islamic cosmology, historical battles, love and existential ideas concerning one’s relationship with society. The historical works of Shah Muhammad Sagir, Alaol, Abdul Hakim, Syed Sultan and Daulat Qazi mixed Bengali folk poetry with Perso-Arabian stories and themes, and are considered an important part of the Muslim culture of Bengal. Ginans are devotional hymns or poems recited by Shia Ismaili Muslims.

Dante Alighieri's Divine Comedy, considered the greatest epic of Italian literature, derived many features of and episodes about the hereafter directly or indirectly from Arabic works on Islamic eschatology: the Hadith and the Kitab al-Miraj (translated into Latin in 1264 or shortly before as Liber scalae Machometi, "The Book of Muhammad's Ladder") concerning Muhammad's ascension to Heaven, and the spiritual writings of Ibn Arabi.

=== Medieval adab works ===
One term for Islamic literature is al-adab al-islami, or adab. Although today adab denotes literature generally, in earlier times its meaning included all that a well-informed person had to know in order to pass in society as a cultured and refined individual. This meaning started with the basic idea that adab was the socially accepted ethical and moral quality of an urbane and courteous person'; thus adab can also denote the category of Islamic law dealing with etiquette, or a gesture of greeting.

According to Issa J. Boullata,

Adab material had been growing in volume in Arabia before Islam and had been transmitted orally for the most part. With the advent of Islam, its growth continued and it became increasingly diversified. It was gradually collected and written down in books, ayrab literature other material adapted from Persian, Sanskrit, Greek, and other tongues as the Arabic language spread with the expansion of Islam's political dominion in the world. It included stories and saying from the Bible, the Qur’ān, and the Ḥadīth. Eventually, the heritage of adab became so large that philologists and other scholars had to make selections, therefore, each according to his interests and his plans to meet the needs of particular readers, such as students seeking learning and cultural refinement, or persons associated with the Islamic state such as viziers, courtiers, chancellors, judges, and government secretaries seeking useful knowledge and success in polished quarters.

Key early adab anthologies were the al-Mufaḍḍaliyyāt of Al-Mufaḍḍal al-Ḍabbī (d. c. 780 CE); Abū Tammām's Dīwān al-Ḥamāsa (d. 846 CE); ʿUyūn al-Akhbār, compiled by Ibn Qutayba (d. 889 CE); and Ibn ʿAbd Rabbih's al-ʿIqd al-Farīd (d. 940 CE).

== Role in Islamisation ==
Some scholar's studies attribute the role of Islamisation of Muslim individuals and communities, social, cultural and political behavior by legitimization through various genres like Muslim historiographies, Islamic advice literature and other Islamic literature.

== Prizes ==
=== Booker prize ===
The British Indian novelist and essayist Salman Rushdie's (b.1947) second novel, Midnight's Children won the Booker Prize in 1981 and was deemed to be "the best novel of all winners" on two separate occasions, marking the 25th and the 40th anniversary of the prize. In 1989, in an interview following the fatwa against him for alleged blaspheme in his novel The Satanic Verses, Rushdie said that he was in a sense a lapsed Muslim, though "shaped by Muslim culture more than any other", and a student of Islam.

Oman author Jokha Alharthi (b.1978) was the first Arabic-language writer to win the Man Booker International Prize in 2019 with her novel Celestial Bodies. The book focuses on three Omani sisters and the country's history of slavery.

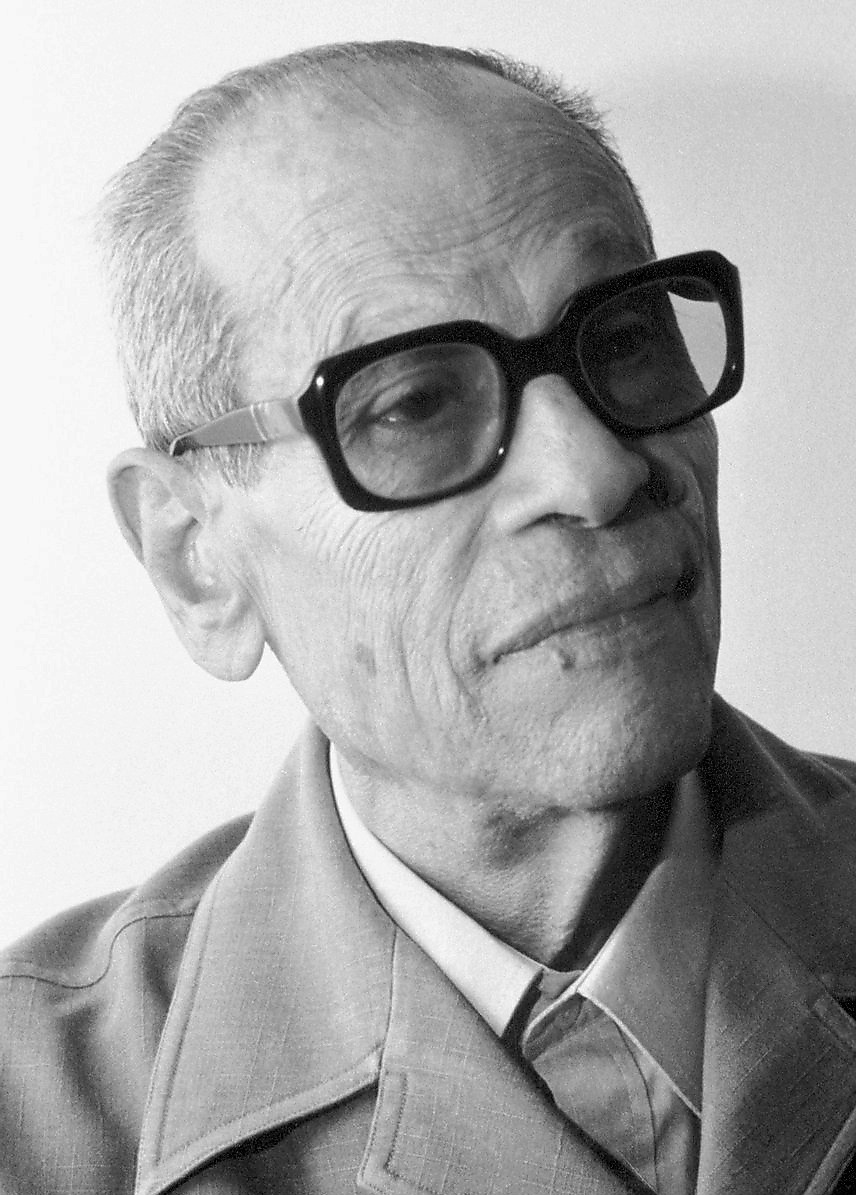
Naguib Mahfouz

=== Nobel prize ===
The 1988 Nobel Prize in Literature was given to the Egyptian author Naguib Mahfouz (1911–2006), "who, through works rich in nuance—now clear-sightedly realistic, now evocatively ambiguous—has formed an Arabian narrative art that applies to all mankind". He was the first Muslim author to receive such a prize. With regard to religion Mahfouz describes himself as, "a pious moslem believer".

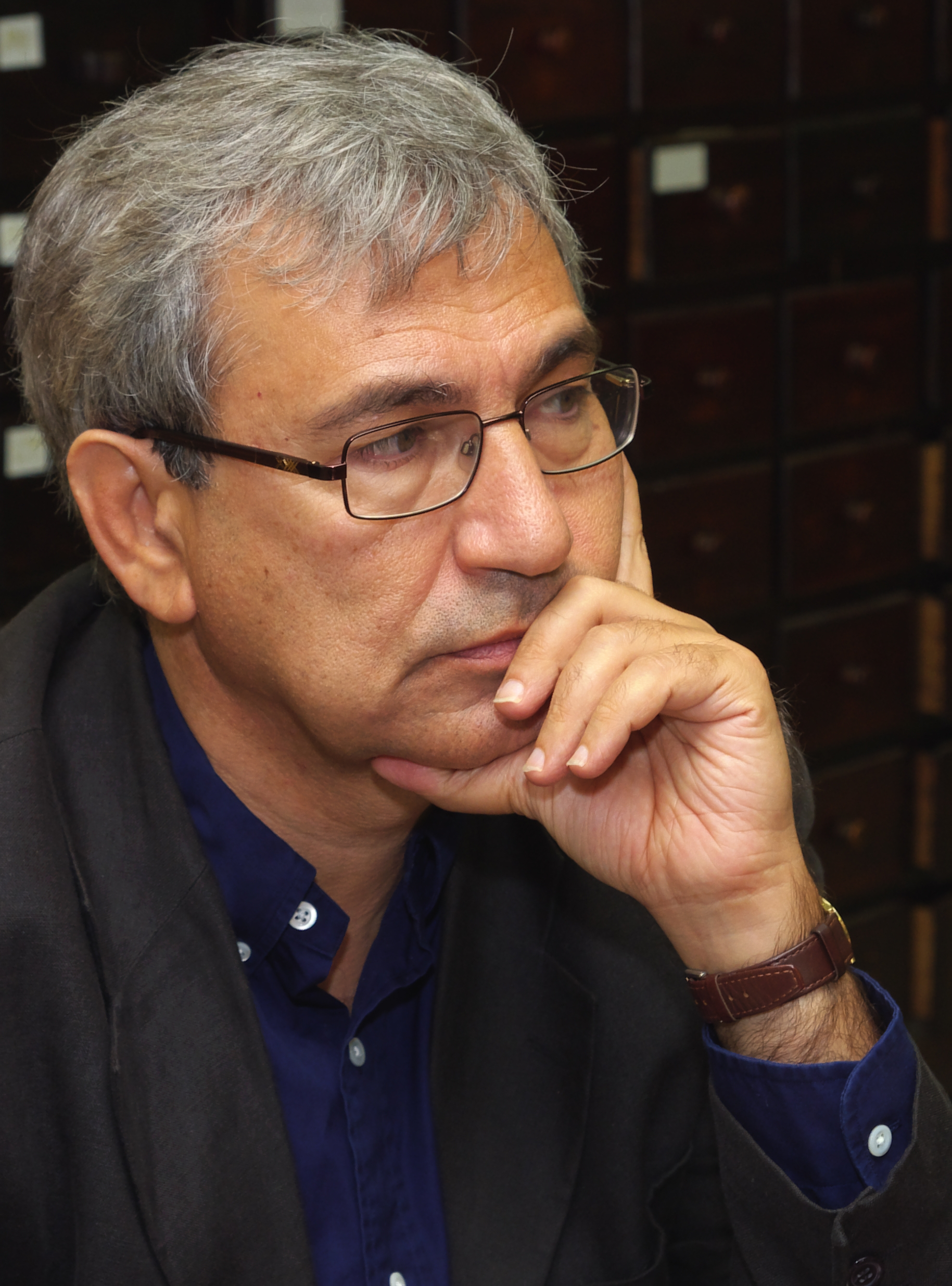
Orhan Pamuk

The 2006 Nobel Prize in Literature was awarded to the Turkish author Orhan Pamuk "(b. 1952) famous for his novels My Name Is Red and Snow, "who in the quest for the melancholic soul of his native city has discovered new symbols for the clash and interlacing of cultures". Pamuk was the first Turk to receive the Nobel Prize, He describes himself as a Cultural Muslim who associates the historical and cultural identification with the religion while not believing in a personal connection to God. When asked if he considered himself a Muslim, Pamuk replied: ": "I consider myself a person who comes from a Muslim culture. In any case, I would not say that I'm an atheist. So I'm a Muslim who associates historical and cultural identification with this religion. I do not believe in a personal connection to God; that's where it gets transcendental. I identify with my culture, but I am happy to be living on a tolerant, intellectual island where I can deal with Dostoyevsky and Sartre, both great influences for me".

=== International Prize for Arabic Fiction ===
The International Prize for Arabic Fiction is a literary prize managed in association with the Booker Prize Foundation in London and supported by the Emirates Foundation in Abu Dhabi. The prize is for prose fiction by Arabic authors. Each year, the winner of the prize receives US$50,000 and the six shortlisted authors receive US$10,000 each. The aim of the award is to recognise and reward excellence in contemporary Arabic fiction writing and to encourage wider readership of good-quality Arabic literature in the region and internationally. The prize is also designed to encourage the translation and promotion of Arabic language literature into other major world languages. An independent board of trustees, drawn from across the Arab world and beyond, is responsible for appointing six new judges each year, and for the overall management of the prize.

=== King Faisal Prize ===
The King Faisal Prize (Arabic: جائزة الملك فيصل) is an annual award sponsored by King Faisal Foundation presented to "dedicated men and women whose contributions make a positive difference". The foundation awards prizes in five categories: Service to Islam; Islamic studies; the Arabic language and Arabic literature; science; and medicine. Three of the prizes are widely considered as the most prestigious awards in the Muslim world.

== See also ==
- Arabic literature
  - Arabic epic literature
- Persian literature
- South Asian literature
- Turkish literature
