= Nura al-Badi =

Omani poet

Nura 'Abd Allah al-Badi (born 1969) is an Omani poet.

Al-Badi is a resident of Al Buraimi. She studied at the College of Languages and Translation of Ajman University, and by profession works in the field of education. One volume of her poetry, Li-l-shahin jina hurr (The Falcon Has a Free Wing), was published in Cairo. She has also written a weekly newspaper column for Al Khaleej. Her radio series Kalimat al-haqq (The True Word) was created for Abu Dhabi radio, and she has also written the text of an operetta, Sawt al-ard (Voice of the Earth), on environmental themes. Her poetry has also been anthologized.

== See also ==
- Jokha Alharthi
- Nasra Al Adawi
- Huda Hamed
