= Anas Abu Rahma =

Children's author

- Born: December 1985 (age 40); Ramallah, Palestine
- Title: Children's Author
- Spouse: Lobna Hamdan Taha
- Children: Sari Abu Rahma
- Awards: Arab Publishers Award 2016 The Etisalat Award 2019

Anas Abu Rahma (Arabic: أنس أبو رحمة; born 1985 in Ramallah, Palestine) is a children's author He has published a poetry collection under the title Diwan Hijab and has also published books for children like The Yellow Corn Inn (original title: Nazl al-Thura al-Safra’) and (We are) Going to (original title: Thahiboun ila), as well as other books, Sheep and Wool (original title: Kharouf wa Soof), (We are) Very Hungry (original title: Ja’oun Jidan) and others. He has also written several articles for websites on the Internet.

== Career ==
Anas’s career started in Palestinian lands in places like Jordan valley and Bedouin communities, in order to encourage the habit of reading and to help children develop their ability to express and to improve their communication skills. He has also worked with teachers and mothers and helped schools apply children’s literature. Anas Abu Rahma has also written several episodes for children’s television programs.

== Awards ==
Anas’s novel, The Yellow Corn Inn was nominated for the Etisalat Award for children’s literature 2015. The Yellow Corn Inn also won Arab Publishers Award for being the best work for young adults in 2016. In 30 October 2019 during the Sharjah international Book Fair, the Palestinian writer won the 11th Etisalat Award for his illustrated story, A Story About S and L which was issued by the National House for Publishing and distribution in the Jordanian capital, Amman.

== Works ==
His most prominent works are:

- “Diwan Hijab”
- “The Yellow Corn Inn” (original title: Nazl al-Thura al-Safra’)
- “(We are) Going to” (original title: Thahiboun Ila)
- “Red” (original title: Ahmar)
- “Sheep and Wool” (original title: Kharouf wa Soof)
- “Marw Lane” (original title: Harat Marw)
- “(We are) Very Hungry” (original title: Ja’oun Jidan)
