= Maya Al-Hayat =

Palestinian novelist, poet, storyteller, and translator

- Born: 1980 (age 45–46); Beirut, Lebanon
- Education: Bachelor's degree in Civil Engineering
- Alma mater: An-Najah National University
- Occupations: Writer, novelist, poet, storyteller, translator, screenwriter, actress

Maya Abu Al-Hayyat (1980) is a Palestinian novelist, poet, storyteller, and translator, born in Beirut. She has published three novels and three collections of poetry. Her books have gained worldwide recognition, and some of her stories have been translated into different languages. Abu Al-Hayyat also worked as an actress and ran the Palestine Writing Workshop. Abu Al-Hayyat played a prominent role in children's literature, writing and presenting television programs for children, including "Iftah Ya Simsim," and was distinguished by her writing of children's stories.

== Personal life ==
Abu Al-Hayyat was born in Beirut, Lebanon in 1980, but grew up in Jordan. Her mother is Lebanese and her father Palestinian. She was raised by her aunt. At some point, she joined her father in Tunis. In 2003, she received a degree in civil engineering from An-Najah National University in Nablus.

Abu Al-Hayyat moved between Amman, Jordan, and Tunis, Tunisia before settling in Jerusalem with her family. She moved to Jerusalem in 2008. She lives in Jerusalem with her husband and three children.

== Career ==
Abu Al-Hayyat's professional life began as a civil engineer. Following this, she worked as a storyteller and actress; she played a role in the movie "Love, Theft and Other Problems" directed by Muayad Alyan. She also headed the Palestine Writing Association, which specializes in encouraging reading by organizing programs to teach creative writing and also produces stories for children and young adults. In addition, she managed the Palestine Writing Workshop.

Abu Al-Hayyat published her first novel, "The Sugar Beans," in 2004, followed by her first collection of poetry, "What She Said About It," in 2007. In 2013, she became the director of the Palestine Writing Workshop.

Abu Al-Hayyat has written novels, collections of poetry, and children’s books, including the award-winning book The Blue Pool of Questions. Further, she has been writing for television programs for children, including Sesame Street (Arabic version, iftah ya simsim), and produced a set of stories, including "Masouda," "The Turtle" and "Kiki and Coco in the Clinic." She presented children's programs such as "Farhan and Friends" for many years on Palestine TV.

Some of Abu Al-Hayyat's stories and poems have been published in other languages, including a Swedish translation of "The Bedtime Story" in Swedish; and translations to English of: "The Blue Pool of Questions" (by Hanan Awad) and No One Knows their Blood Type (translated by Hazem Jamjoum, winning the 2025 Palestine Book Award (translation category), shortlisted for the American Literary Translators Association (ALTA) First Translation Prize, and long listed for the ALTA National Translation Prize in Prose). Abu Al-Hayyat herself has also translated several novels from other languages into Arabic, including "Kolka" by Bengt Olson, "The Old Man Who Broke All Barriers" by Catherine Engelman, and "The Red Bird" by Astrid Lindgren.

Her work has appeared in the Los Angeles Review of Books, Cordite Poetry Review, The Guardian, and Literary Hub. Further, she is the editor of The Book of Ramallah, a book of short stories published by Comma Press in its "Reading the City" Series.

== Works ==
=== Novels ===
- (2004), “Habbat Min Al-Sukkar” (Beads of Sugar): Palestinian House of Poetry. Ramallah
- (2011), “Ataba Thaqilat Al-Ruh” (Threshold of Heavy Soul): Ugarit Foundation.
- (2013), “La Ahad Yarifu Zumrat Damih” (No One Knows Their Blood Type): Dar Al-Adab. Beirut
- (2014), “Heen Ya'ud Abi- Al-marhala Al-sadisa- Mubtadi” (When my father returns – the sixth stage – a beginner): Asala Publishing. Beirut
- (2016), “Fasateen Baitiya Wa Hurub” (Home Dresses and Wars): Al Ahlia for Publishing and Distribution. Amman
- (2018), "Glitter": The Mediterranean Publications Library. Baghdad

=== Children stories ===
- (2011), “Kisas Ma Kabla Al-Nawm” (A Bedtime Story):Tamer Institute for Community Education. Ramallah
- (2015), “Mas’ouda Al-Sulhafa'” (The Turtle Masouda): Al-Hodhud for Publishing and Distribution. Dubai
- (2015), “Kiki Wa Kuku Fi Al-'iyada” (Kiki and Coco in the Clinic): Al Hodhud for Publishing and Distribution. Dubai
- (2016), “Birkat Al-As'ila Al-Zarqa” (The Blessing of Blue Questions) Palestine Writing Workshop. Ramallah. Mediterranean Publications Library. Baghdad
- (2016), “Falful Fi Bayt Al-ghul” (Falful in the House of the Ghoul): Palestine Writing Workshop. Ramallah
- (2016), “As'ila Fi Haqibat Al-safar” (Questions in a Travel Bag): Change Association. 2016
- (2017), “Bashour” (Bashour) Tagyeer Association
- (2017), “Tabakhat Al-kalimat” (The Cook of Words), Tagyeer Association
- (2020), "Waleed"

=== Poetry collections ===
- (2007), “Ma Qalat'hu Fih” (What She Said About It): Palestinian House of Poetry Publications
- (2012), “Tilka Al-Ibtisama.. Thalika Al-Qalb” (That smile.. that heart): Raya Publishing and Translation. Haifa

=== Translations ===
- (2012), “Altair Alahmar”(The Red Bird) by Astrid Lindgren. Tamer Foundation for Community Education
- (2017), “Kolka” by Bengt Olson. Dar Al Mona. Giza
- “Alajuz Alati Kasarat Kul Alhawajiz” (The Old Man Who Broke All Barriers) by Catherine Engelman. Al Mona Publication, Giza

=== Works in Translation ===
- (2017) The Blue Pool of Questions. Illustrated by Hassan Manasrah. Translated by Hanan Awad. Penny Candy Books.
- (2024) You Can Be the Last Leaf: Selected Poems. Translated by Fady Joudah. Milkweed Editions.
- (2024) No One Knows Their Blood Type. Translated by Hazem Jamjoum. CSU Poetry Center.

== Grants ==
Abu Al-Hayyat received the “Horizons” grant from the Arab Fund for Arts and Culture (AFAC) for her novel No One Knows Their Blood Type in 2011.

== Awards ==
- 2005 Young Creative Writer Award, Ministry of Culture
- 2006 Young Writer Award for Poetry, A.M. Qattan Foundation
- 2016 Best Illustration (in The Blue Lake of Questions), Etisalat Award for Arabic Children’s Literature
