= Fatima Sharafeddine =

Lebanese writer and editor

- فاطمة شرف الدين
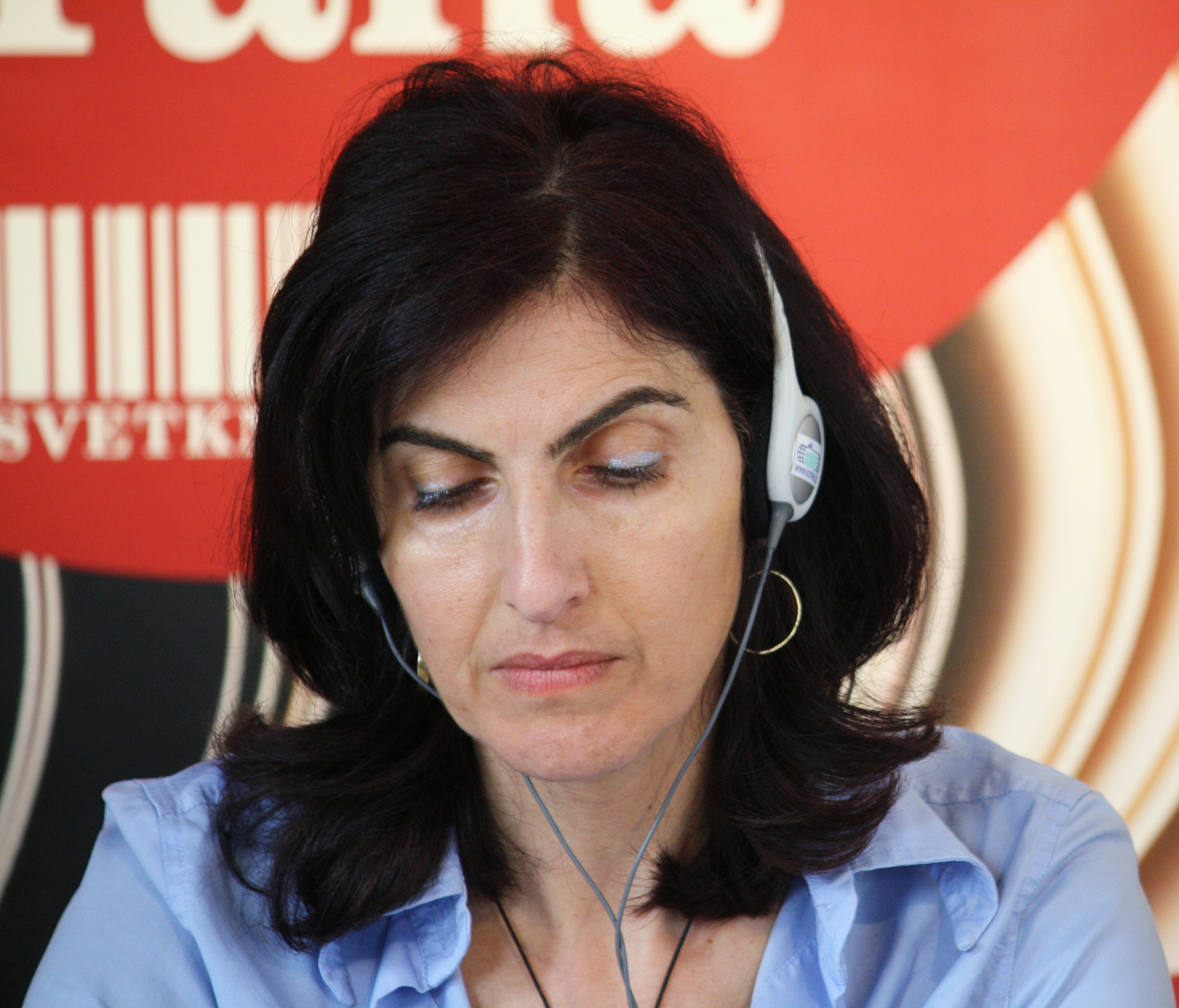
- Sharafeddine in 2011
- Born: 1966 (age 59–60); Beirut, Lebanon
- Education: B.A. in Early Childhood Education; M.A. in Educational Theory and Practice; M.A. in Modern Arabic Literature
- Alma mater: Lebanese American University; Ohio State University
- Occupations: Writer; editor; translator
- Years active: 2005–present

Fatima Sharafeddine (Arabic: فاطمة شرف الدين; born 1966) is a Lebanese writer, editor, and translator of children's and young adults' books. She holds an M.A. in Educational Theory and Practice (1993) and an M.A. in Modern Arabic literature (1996), both from Ohio State University. More than 120 books of Sharafeddine were published all over the world, and many of them were translated into more than 15 languages including English, Dutch, and Spanish. Sharafeddine has won several awards such as the Etisalat Children's Literature Award in 2017. She was, moreover, nominated for the Astrid Lindgren Memorial Award in 2010, 2011, 2016, and 2020.

== Biography ==
=== Early life ===
Fatima Sharafeddine was born in 1966 in Beirut, Lebanon. She moved with her parents to Sierra Leone and settled there until the age of six. She then returned to her homeland, Lebanon. In 1989, Sharafeddine joined the Lebanese American University to study Early childhood education. After graduation, she moved to the US where she obtained her M.A. in Educational Theory and Practice (1993) and an M.A. in Modern Arabic literature (1996) from Ohio State University. After that, she headed to Texas in 1996 where she worked as a lead teacher. Additionally, she delivered Arabic and culture lectures at Rice University.

=== Literary career ===
Sharafeddine started her writing career in 2005. She has written more than 120 books for children and young adults including My Book Got Bored and Cappuccino. She translated several children's books from French and English into Arabic; and many of her books were translated into multiple languages, such as: English, Spanish, Hindi, and Dutch. In her books, Sharafeddine avoids the direct method of serving the child the moral lesson on a silver platter; instead, she helps the child comprehend the lesson on their own by seeking to nurture their imagination and emotions. Sharafeddine has won several awards including the Bologna Ragazzi New Horizon Award for Tongue Twisters (2016) and the Etisalat Award for her novel Cappuccino (2017). She was also long-listed for the Sheikh Zayed Book Award for The Red Maple Leaf (2016) and nominated for the Etisalat Award- Young Adult Book of the Year for Mila's Pear (2019).

== Personal life and political views ==
Fatima Sharafeddine is married and has two children.

As a woman who had to emigrate from her home country to escape the civil war, Sharafeddine wanted to raise awareness of what was happening in Lebanon, precisely, the state of war between Lebanon and Israel. Her book Faten highlights the author's motivations.

== Published works ==
Fatima Sharafeddine's first book was published in 2004. Today, she has more than 45 published books which mainly come from three publishers, which are Asala, Kalimat, and Mijade.

- Attanbouri's Shoe (original title: Hitha’a Attanbouri), 2008 (ISBN: 9789953488851)
- Faten, 2010 (ISBN: 9789948157786)
- Ghadi and Rawan, 2013 (ISBN: 9786144257463)
- Such Things Happen (original title: Hakatha Omor Tahduth), 2013 (ISBN: 9781855169258)
- Cappuccino, 2018 (ISBN: 9786144259771)
- Mila's Pear (original title: Egasat Mila), 2019 (ISBN: 9786140321304)
- The Amazing Discoveries of Ibn Sina, 2013 (ISBN: 9781554987108)

== Recognition ==
Some of the awards that Sharafeddine has won are:

- 2011: Reading Here, There and Everywhere Award organized by Anna Lindh Foundation, for her book Laughter and Crying.
- 2013: Best Book Award at the Sharjah Book Fair for My book got bored.
- 2016: Bologna Ragazzi New Horizon Award for Tongue Twisters.
- 2017: Etisalat Award for the young adult novel Cappuccino.

Some of Sharafeddine's works that got nominated for awards:

- 2013: Shortlisted for Etisalat Award for Ghadi and Rawan.
- 2015: Shortlisted for Etisalat Award for Sumsum in mom's tummy.
- 2016: Long-listed for the Sheikh Zayed Award for The red maple leaf.
- 2019: Nominated for Etisalat Award – Young Adult Book of the Year for Mila's Pear.

Sharafeddine has translated some books from English into Arabic and vice versa, including:

- Everything Is Allowed by Nele Moost (ISBN: 9953445095), 2007
- Meriam's Star by Mahnaz Malik, (ISBN: 9789948157878), 2010
- My Own Special Way Maitha Al-Khayat, 2012
