= Taghreed Najjar =

Palestinian-Jordanian writer

Taghreed Aref Najjar
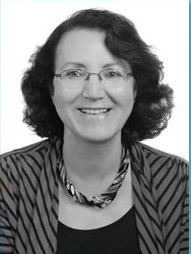
- Born: 28 September 1951 (age 74); Amman, Jordan
- Education: BA in English Language
- Alma mater: American University of Beirut
- Occupations: writer, publisher
- Years active: 1977–present

Taghreed Najjar (Arabic:تغريد النجار) (born 28 September 1951) is a Palestinian-Jordanian writer and publisher. She is the writer of over 50 Arabic children and young adults books. Some of her books were translated and published in different languages including English, Swedish, Turkish and French. She is the founder of Al Salwa Publishing House. Over the years, Al Najjar won several literary awards and in 2017 she was shortlisted for the Etisalat Children's Literature Award and the Sheikh Zayed Award. She is a member of the Jordanian Writer's Association.

== Education and career ==
Najjar is an author of children and young adult books who was born on 28 September 1951 in Jordan. In 1973, she graduated from the American University of Beirut with a bachelor's degree in English Language and a Diploma in Education with a minor in Psychology. Najjar worked as an English teacher and published her first children book "Safwan the Acrobat" in 1977. She has published more than 65 published books for children and young adults and she is considered a pioneer of modern literature of children in Jordan. Her book "Hawk Eye Mystery" was shortlisted in the Young Adult Book of the Year for Etisalat Award in 2014. At the same year, her story "Raghda's Hat" was shortlisted for Sheikh Zayed Book Award for Eighth Session. In 2019, Najjar was nominated for Astrid Lindgren Memorial Award. Her books were translated into different languages including Turkish, English, Swedish, French, and Chinese. Najjar participated in many international and regional conferences, events, and festivals like the Emirates Airline Festival of Literature in 2018.

== Works ==
=== Children ===
- Safwan the Acrobat (Original title: Safwan Al Bahlawan), 1977
- I Am Amazing (Original title: Ana Mudhisha), 1999
- I Can (Original title: Inani Astatee), 1999
- Not Yet (Original title: Laysa Baad), 1999
- My Brother Zaid (Original title: Akhi Zaid), 1999
- One Dark Night (Original title: Fi Layla Mothlema), 1999
- The Lie That Grew Bigger (Original title: Al Kethba Alati Kabarat), 2001
- Why Should I Sleep Early (Original title: Limatha Anamu Bakeran?), 2001
- The Nicest Day (Original title: Ahla Youm), 2004
- A Frog in our Classroom (Original title: Fi Safina Defda’a), 2004
- Don’t Worry Dad (Original title: La Taqlaq Ya Abi), 2004
- First Day of School (Original title: Awal Youm Madrasa), 2005
- My Favorite Animal (Original title: Hayawani Al Mufadal), 2005
- When the Doorbell Rang (Original title: Endama Yaduqu Al Bab), 2006
- Adventure on the Farm (Original title: Mugamara Fi Al Mazra’a), 2008
- The Story about a Boy Named Jacob (Original title: Kisat Walad Esmuhu Fayez), 2008
- A Day on the Beach (Original title: Youmun Ala Shatee Al Bahr), 2009
- This is How Fish Swim (Original title: Hek Yesbahu Al Asmak), 2010
- Tasseh Tarantaseh, 2010
- A Home for Arnoub (Original title: Bait Al Arnab Al Saier), 2010
- Nashma and Jassem (Original title: Nashma wa Jassem), 2011
- Karma’s Rabbit (Original title: Arnabu Karma), 2011
- Anything (Original title: Ai Shaai), 2011
- Omar is Lost (Original title: Da’a Omar), 2012
- Watch Out Jude (Original title: Intabihi Ya Jude), 2012
- Jude’s New Bicycle (Original title: Jude Wa Darajatuha Al Jadeeda), 2012
- The Complete Halazone Series (Original title: Selselat Al Halazona Al Khamela), 2012
- Who Hid the Eid Lamb? (Original title: Man Khabaa Kharof Al Aid?), 2012
- Fifi, 2012
- My Grandmother Nafeesa (Original title: Gadati Nafeesa), 2012
- Why not? (Original title: Ma Al Manai), 2013
- There’s a Jungle in Saifo’s Room (Original title: Fi Ghurfat Saifo Ghaba), 2014
- Mr. Policeman (Original title: Amo Al Shurti), 2013
- Kaak, 2013
- Us Three Together (Original title: Ihna Al Thalatha Sawa), 2013
- Saadeh the Monkey, 2013
- There’s a Jungle in Saifo’s Room (Original title: Fi Ghurfat Saifo Ghaba), 2014
- Sky is Raining Food (Original title: Al Sama Tumtiru Ta’aman), 2015
- Al Ghoul, 2015
- The Hard to Please Horse (Original title: Ashhab La Ya’ajebhu Al Ajab), 2016
- The Amazing Toilet Paper Roll (Original title: Lafafat Al Waraq Al Ajeeba), 2016
- What Happened to My Brother Ramez? (Original title: Matha Hasala Li Akhi Ramez), 2016
- Mrs. Jawaher and Her Cats (Original title: Al Sayeda Jawaher Sadeeqat Al Qitat), 2016
- Sleep Zaina (Original title: Nami Ya Zina), 2016
- A Strange Adventure (Original title: Mughamara Ajeeba Ghareeba), 2017
- Zekazam Zekazoom, 2018
- The Amazing Egg Cartons 1 (Original title: Cartoonat Al Baid Al Ajeeba 1), 2019
- The Amazing Egg Cartons 2 (Original title: Cartoonat Al Baid Al Ajeeba 2), 2019
- Tala’s Car (Original title: Saiarat Tala), 2019
- No Tala (Original title: La Ya Tala), 2019
- When Mama Got Sick (Original title: Mama Maredaa), 2019
- The Bird Flew (Original title: Wa Tar Al A’sfur), 2019
- Who’s First (Original title: Man Awalan?), 2019
- The Doctor’s Visit (Original title: Ziarat Tabeeb) 2019
- The Case of the Spotted Leopard (Original title: Sair Al Fahd Al Muraqqat), 2019

=== Teen ===
- Raghda’s Hat (Original title: Kubaat Raghda), 2012
- Against the Tide (Original title: Set Al Kul), 2013
- The Mystery of the Falcon’s Eye (Original title: Lugz Ain Al Saqer), 2014
- One Day the Sun Will Shine (Original title: SaToshreq Al Shamsu WaLw Bada Heen), 2017
- Whose Doll is This? (Original title: Liman Hathihi Al Dumia), 2019

== Awards ==
She has been shortlisted and nominated for many awards, including the Etisalat Award for Arabic Children's Literature, Sheikh Zayed Book Award, and Astrid Lindgren Memorial Award.

- Her collection of rhymes, named "Musical Tickles" was selected by the National Center for Children's Literature as one of the best publications in the Arab World in 2012/2013.
- Her book "What Happened to My Brother Ramiz?" won the Etisalat Award for Arabic Children's Literature for Best Production.

== See also ==
- Eman Al Yousuf
- Maria Dadouch
- Huda Hamad
