= A Little Piece of Ground =

2003 book by Elizabeth Laird

- First edition cover
- Author: Elizabeth Laird
- Language: English
- Genre: Young adult novel
- Publisher: Macmillan Publishers
- Publication date: August 15, 2003
- Publication place: United Kingdom
- Media type: Print (Paperback)
- Pages: 214 pp (first edition)
- ISBN: 0-330-43679-1
- OCLC: 52458080

A Little Piece of Ground is a young adult novel by Elizabeth Laird, written with Sonia Nimr. The book is about a twelve-year-old boy and his family struggling under the occupation of the Palestinian Territories. It was first published by Macmillan in 2003 and reprinted by Haymarket Books in 2006. In 2003 it was a nominee for the Carnegie Medal and in 2004 won the Hampshire Book Award. The story comes from Laird's experiences in Lebanon during the Lebanese Civil War. The book has attracted some controversy regarding its portrayal of Israel/Palestinian relations. The book was translated into Arabic and rewritten with the Palestinian author Sonia Nimr and it was published by Tamer Institute for Community Education.
