= Jokha Alharthi =

Omani writer and academic

- جوخة الحارثي
- Born: 1978 (age 47–48); Oman
- Education: University of Edinburgh
- Occupations: Writer and academic
- Known for: Man Booker International Prize 2019
- Notable work: Celestial Bodies
- Website: jokha.com

Jokha Alharthi (Arabic: جوخة الحارثي), also spelt al-Harthi, is an Omani writer and academic, known for winning the Man Booker International Prize in 2019 for her novel Sayyidat al-Qamar (Arabic: سيدات القمر), published in English under the title Celestial Bodies. Alharthi is the first Arab author to win the Man Booker International Prize. She has written four novels in Arabic, three of which have been translated into English.

== Biography ==
Born in 1978, Alharthi was educated in Oman and in the United Kingdom. She obtained her PhD in classical Arabic literature from the University of Edinburgh, graduating in 2011. In 2010, Alharthi was offered a professorship in classical Arabic literature at Sultan Qaboos University in Muscat, Oman. As of 2021, she is an associate professor. Alharthi has three children.

Alharthi has published three collections of short stories, three children's books, and four novels (Manamat, Sayyidat al-Qamar, Narinjah, and Harir al-Ghazala). She has also authored academic works. Her work has been translated into English, Serbian, Korean, Italian, and German and published in Banipal magazine. Alharthi won the Sultan Qaboos Award for Culture, Arts and Literature for her novel Narinjah (Bitter Orange) in 2016.

Sayyidat al-Qamar was shortlisted for the Zayed Award in 2011. An English translation by Marilyn Booth was published in the UK by Sandstone Press in June 2018 under the title Celestial Bodies, and won the Man Booker International Prize in 2019. Sayyidat el-Qamar was the first work by an Arabic-language writer to be awarded the Man Booker International Prize, and the first novel by an Omani woman to appear in English translation. The judges heralded the book as "a richly imagined, engaging and poetic insight into a society in transition and into lives previously obscured." In 2025, the novel was published in German, translated by Claudia Ott, who has published historical Arabic stories in German, including the Arabian Nights.

Alharthi's novel Narinjah, also translated by Marilyn Booth, was published in English under the title Bitter Orange Tree. It was named one of the best reviewed works in translation for 2022, and one of 100 must-read books of the year by TIME. In the Times Literary Supplement, Diana Darke called it "highly attuned" and "deeply emotional". Some reviews were more mixed - in The Guardian, Maya Jaggi commented on "structural flaws and an overambitious global reach make for a patchy read". while in the Washington Post, Ron Charles acclaimed an "exquisitely sensitive novel", that nevertheless "spins its wheels without going anywhere."

Harir al-Ghazala, Alharti's fourth novel to be published in Arabic, tells the story of a woman who was abandoned at birth. It was published by Lebanese publishing house Dar Al Adab in 2021.

== Bibliography ==
- Manamat (Beirut: Lebanon: al-Mu'assassah al- 'Arabiyah li al-Dirasat wa al-Nashr, 2004).
- Sayyidat al-Qamar (Beirut, Lebanon: Dār al-Ādāb, 2010). Celestial Bodies, trans. Marilyn Booth (Scotland: Sandstone Press, 2018).
- Narinjah (Beirut, Lebanon: Dār al-Ādāb, 2016). Bitter Orange Tree, trans. Marilyn Booth (New York: Catapult, 2022).
- Harir al-Ghazala (Beirut, Lebanon: Dār al-Ādāb, 2021). Silken Gazelles, trans. Marilyn Booth (New York: Catapult, 2024).

== See also ==
- Huda Hamed
- Nura al-Badi
- Nasra Al Adawi
