= Al-ʿIqd al-Farīd =

Book by Ibn Abd Rabbih

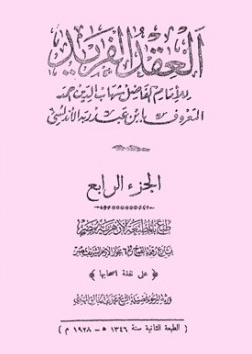
- Al-ʿIqd al-Farīd 1346
- Author: Ibn ʿAbd Rabbih
- Original title: العقد الفريد
- Language: Arabic
- Subject: Adab (literature and culture)
- Genre: Anthology
- Publication date: 10th century
- Publication place: Al-Andalus (modern-day Spain)
- Media type: Print

al-ʿIqd al-Farīd (The Unique Necklace, Arabic: العقد الفريد) is an anthology attempting to encompass 'all that a well-informed person had to know in order to pass in society as a cultured and refined individual' (or adab), composed by Ibn ʿAbd Rabbih (860–940), an Arab writer and poet from Córdoba in Al-Andalus.

== History ==
There are around 40 known surviving manuscripts of al-ʿIqd al-Farīd in the world. The first printed edition was published in 1876 by the Bulaq Press in Egypt. Another seven editions were printed in Cairo and two were printed in Beirut. According to Issa J. Boullata, the best three editions are those edited by Ahmad Amin et al and published in seven volumes in its third edition by لجنة التأليف والترجمة والنشر in 1965, by Muḥammad Saʻīd al-ʻIryān and published in eight volumes its second edition by Matba'at al-Istiqama in 1953, and by Mufīd Muḥammad Qumayḥa and published in 9 volumes by Dar Al-Kotob Al-Ilmiyah in 1997.

Portions of the work were translated and published. The French orientalist Fulgence Fresnel published material on pre-Islamic Arabs in Lettres sur l'histoire des arabes avant l'islamisme 1838, Muhammad Shafi translated material on Mecca and Medina in "A description of the two sanctuaries of Islam by Ibn 'Abd Rabbihi" in 1922, and the British orientalist and musicologist Henry George Farmer published material on music in the Journal of the Royal Asiatic Society in 1942, and Arthur Wormhoudt published material on secretaries as "al-Kitaba wal-kuttab from the Aqd al-Farid" in 1988. al-ʿIqd al-Farīd was translated in full and published in English for the first time by Issa J. Boullata in 2004.

Jibrāʾīl Jabbūr's 1933 Ibn ʿAbd Rabbih wa ʿIqduh [Ibn ʿAbd Rabbih and his Necklace] is the most extensive study of the work. Jabbur notes the extent to which Ibn ʿAbd Rabbih's depended on Ibn Qutaybah, particularly his ʿUyun al-akhbar.

== Contents ==
The anthology is divided into 25 sections. The 13th section is named the middle jewel of the necklace, and the chapters on either side are named after other jewels. It is an adab book resembling Ibn Qutaybah's `Uyun al-akhbar (The Fountains of Story) and the writings of al-Jahiz from which it borrows largely. Although he spent all his life in al-Andalus and did not travel to the East like some other Andalusian scholars, most of his book's material is drawn from the East Islamic world. Also, Ibn Abd Rabbih quoted no Andalusian compositions other than his own. He included in his book his 445-line Urjuza, a poem in the meter of the rajaz in which he narrates the warlike exploits of Abd al-Rahman al-Nasir, along with some of his eulogies of the Umayyads of al-Andalus. A major study of its sources was undertaken by Werkmeister.

As transliterated and translated by Isabel Toral-Niehoff, the books for The Unique Necklace are:

1. The Book of the Pearl on Rulership and Authority 26 (Kitāb al-luʼluʼa fī l-sulṭān)
2. The Book of the Nonpareil Jewel on Warfare (Kitāb al-farīda fī l-ḥurūb)
3. The Book of the Chrysolite on Generous Men and Gifts (Kitāb al-zabarjada fī l-ajwād wa-l-aṣfād)
4. The Book of the Nacre on Delegations (Kitāb al-jumāna fī l-wufūd)
5. The Book of the Coral on the Etiquette of Addressing Kings (Kitāb al-marjāna fī mukhāṭabat al-mulūk)
6. The Book of the Ruby on Knowledge and adab (Kitāb al-yaqūta fī l-ʻilm wa-l-adab)
7. The Book of the Gem on Proverbs (Kitāb al-jawhara fī l-amthāl)
8. The Book of the Emerald on Sermonizing and Asceticism (Kitāb al-zumurruda fī l-muwāʻaẓa wa-l-zuhd)
9. The book of the Mother-of Pearl on Condolences and Elegies (Kitāb al-durra fī l-taʻāzī wa-l-marāthī)
10. The Book of the Unique Jewel on Genealogy and Virtues of the Arabs (Kitāb al-yatīma fī l-nasab wa-faḍāʼil al-ʻarab)
11. The Book of the Adorable Jewel on the Speech of Bedouins (Kitāb al-masjada fī kalām al-aʻrāb)
12. The Book of the Flanking Jewel on Responses (Kitāb al-mujannaba fī l-ajwiba)
13. The Book of the Middle Jewel on Orations (Kitāb al-wāsiṭa fī l-khuṭab)
14. The Book of the Second Flanking Level on Signatures, Departments, Viziers and the Stories of the Secretaries (Kitāb al-mujannaba al-thāniya fī l-tawqīʻāt wa-l-fuṣūl wa-l-ṣudūr wa-akhbār al-kataba)
15. The book of the Second Adorable Jewel on Caliphs, their Histories, and Battles (Kitāb al-masjada al-thāniya fī l-khulafāʼ wa-l-tawārīkh wa-ayyāmihim)
16. The book of the Second Unique Jewel on Reports about Ziyād, al-Hajjāj, the Ṭālibīyyīn and the Barmakids (Kitāb al-yatīma al-thāniya fī akhbār Ziyād wa-l-Ḥajjāj wa-l-Ṭālibiyyīn wa-l-Barāmika)
17. The Book of the Second Mother of Pearl on the Battle Days of the Arabs (Kitāb al-durra al-thāniya fī ayyām al-ʻarab wa-waqāʼiʻihim)
18. The Book of the Second Emerald on the Merits of Poetry, its Meter and its Scansion (Kitāb al-zumurruda al-thāniya fī faḍāʼil al-shiʻr wa-maqāṭiʻih wa-makhārijih)
19. The book of the Second Gem on Prosody and Metrical Irregularities (Kitāb al-jawhara al-thāniya fī aʻārīḍ al-shiʻr wa-ʻilal al-qawāfī)
20. The Book of the Second Ruby on the Art of Song and Dissenting Opinions Thereof (Kitāb al-yāqūta al-thāniya fī ʻilm al-alḥān wa-ikhtilāf al-nās fīh)
21. The Book of the Second Coral on Women and their Attributes (Kitāb al-marjāna al-thāniya fī l-nisāʼ wa-ṣifātihinna)
22. The Book of the Second Nacre on False Prophets, Lunatics, Misers and Parasites (Kitāb al-jumāna al-thāniya fī l-mutannabiʼīn wa-l-marūrīn wa-l-bukhalāʼ wa-l-ṭufayliyyīn)
23. The Book of the Second Chrysolite on the Nature of Humans and Other Animals and the contention for precedence among cities (Kitāb al-zabarjada al-thāniya fī bayān ṭabāʼiʻ al-insān wa-sāʼir al-ḥayawān wa-tafāḏul al-buldān)
24. The Book of the Second Nonpareil Jewel on Food and Drink (Kitāb al-farīda al-thāniya fī l-ṭaʻām wa-l-sharāb)
25. The Book of the Second Pearl on Tidbits, Gifts, Jokes and Witticism (Kitāb al-luʼluʼa al-thāniya fī l-nutaf wa-l-fukāhāt wa-l-hidāyā wa-l-milaḥ)

== Influence ==
The Būyid vizier Sahib ibn Abbad 'is commonly quoted to illustrate the alleged lackluster reception the book met in the Orient': he is alleged to have said '“this is our merchandise brought back to us.” I thought this book contained some information about their country [Andalusia]. But it rather contains information about ours. We have no need for it' (alluding to Koran 12:65). However, it was widely copied—about 100 manuscripts are known—and was frequently excerpted. It was also among the earliest adab works to be printed and has been printed at least ten times since in different editions. The collection was not, however, translated until scholarly European translations of portions began in the nineteenth century.

== Editions and translations ==
This list focuses on the most recent editions of al-ʿIqd al-Farīd. None is free of typographical errors.

- Ibn ʿAbd Rabbih, The Unique Necklace: Al-ʿIqd al-Farīd, trans. by Issa J. Boullata, Great Books of Islamic Civilization, 3 vols (Reading: Garnet, 2007–2011), vol 1, vol 2
- Kitāb al-ʿIqd al-Farīd, ed. by Aḥmad Amīn, Aḥmad al-Zayn, and Ibrāhīm al-Abyārī, 7 vols (Cairo: Lajnat al-Ta’līf wa al-Tarjama wa al-Nashr, 1940–53) [3rd repr. 1965]. 'This edition, based on two manuscripts and seven previously printed editions, has ample footnotes with a competent apparatus criticus. It also has a good introduction and detailed indexes.'
- Al-ʿIqd al-Farīd, ed. by Muḥammad Saʿīd al-ʿAryān, 8 vols (Cairo: Maṭbaʿat al-Istiqāma, 1940–54) [repr. 1953]. 'This edition has rare footnotes but detailed indexes. Its good text reflects an implicit apparatus criticus in the mind of the editor but it is not explained in the notes. It has a good introduction which faults Aḥmad Amīn's with regard to a couple of historical facts'. The machine-readable text here appears to be from a 1983/84 Beirut reprint of this edition.
- Al-ʿIqd al-Farīd, ed. by Mufīd Muḥammad Qumayḥa, 9 vols (Beirut: Dār al-Kutub al-ʿIlmiyya, 1997). 'This edition has short footnotes, mostly abbreviated or derived from those in the edition of Aḥmad Amīn et al. and published selectively with only a few additions. It has detailed indexes and a general introduction but barely any critical apparatus, its text being mostly based on the edition of Aḥmad Amīn et al. with minor differences.
- Ibn Abed Rabboh. Al-Iqd al-Farīd كتاب: العقد الفريد **|نداء الإيمان (in Arabic). Al-eman.com.
- Ibn ʻAbd Rabbih, Aḥmad b. Muḥammad (1990), al-’Iqd al-farīd, ed. A. Amīn, with an introduction by ʻU. Tadmurī, 7 vols., Beirut.
