= The Garbage King =

Children's fiction book by Elizabeth Laird

- First edition
- Author: Elizabeth Laird
- Illustrator: Yosef Kebeide
- Language: English
- Genre: Children novel
- Publisher: Macmillan Children's Books
- Publication date: 4 Apr 2003
- Publication place: United Kingdom
- Media type: Print (hardback)
- Pages: 329
- ISBN: 978-0-7641-5679-3

The Garbage King is a 2003 children's fiction book written by Elizabeth Laird and illustrated by Yosef Kebede.

Laird was inspired to write the book after living and working in Ethiopia, where, in Addis Ababa, she saw children who lived on the streets who had inspiring abilities to cope with difficult living conditions. It has received numerous British book awards.

== Plot summary ==
It tells the story of Mamo and Dani. Mamo is from a very poor family where everyone has died except for him and his sister, Tiggist. Mamo goes with a man who claims to be his Uncle Merga but is in fact probably one of his deceased mother's lovers. Before Mamo can realize it, "Merga" takes Mamo far from the city and anything he's ever known and sells him to a farmer as a slave.

Dani comes from a rich and privileged family in Addis Ababa. His father, however, wants him to send him away to Jigjiga to make him learn something useful and toughen up. Dani's mother is sick and flew to London, England, to receive better medical care. Dani runs away to escape his father. At the same time, Mamo escapes from the farmer after attempting suicide caused by physical abuse and hitch-hikes back together join a gang of beggar street boys. The members of this gang are using nicknames because they do not know their actual names, or have forgotten them. Their nicknames are Million (The Joviro or gangmaster), Shoes, Getachew, Buffalo and Karate. Karate has a bad sickness that usually makes him go into coughing fits. Later on in the book, Karate passes away from his sickness.

== Awards ==
The Garbage King won the Scottish Arts Council Children's Book of the Year Award and the Stockport Schools Book Award. It was shortlisted for the Carnegie Medal (2003), a Blue Peter Book Award (2004), the Salford Children's Book Award, the Calderdale Children's Book Award, the Lincolnshire Young People's Book Award, the Stockton Children's Book of the Year, the West Sussex Children's Book Award, the Portsmouth Book Award, and the Sheffield Children's Book Award.
