= Elizabeth Laird (author) =

British children's writer

Elizabeth Laird (born 1943) is a British writer of children's fiction and travel. She is also known for the large body of folktales which she collected from the regions of Ethiopia. Her books have been translated into at least twenty languages.

== Biography ==
Laird was born in New Zealand in 1943. She was the fourth child of her Scottish father and New Zealand mother. The family settled in Purley, near London in 1945. A fifth child was born in 1947. He suffered severe disabilities and died in 1949. Laird's first children's novel, Red Sky in the Morning (Heinemann, 1988), was inspired in some measure by her brother's life.

Laird has been a judge of the Walter Scott Prize for Historical Fiction since its inception in 2010.

Laird has received several awards for her work, and has been shortlisted six times for the Carnegie Medal for British children's literature.

== Selected works ==
=== Children's novels ===
- Red Sky in the Morning aka Loving Ben (1988)
- Kiss the Dust (1991)
- Hiding Out (1993)
- Secret Friends (1996)
- Jay (1997)
- Jake's Tower (2001)
- The Garbage King (2003)
- A Little Piece of Ground (with Sonia Nimr, 2003)
- Paradise End (2004)
- Secrets of the Fearless (2005)
- Oranges in No Man's Land (2006)
- Crusade (2007)
- Lost Riders (2008)
- The Witching Hour (2009)
- The Betrayal of Maggie Blair (2011)
- The Prince who Walked with Lions (2012), about Prince Alemayehu
- The Fastest Boy in the World (2014)
- Dindy and the Elephant (2015)
- Welcome to Nowhere (2017)
- Song of the Dolphin Boy (2018)
- A House Without Walls (2019)

=== Picture books ===
- Rosy's Garden (1979)
- A Book of Promises (1999)
- Beautiful Bananas (2004)
- Grobblechops (2019)

=== Folkstory Collections ===
- When the World Began: Stories from Ethiopia (2001)
- Pea Boy: Stories from Iran (2009)
- The Jackal and the Rabbit: Fables of Kalilah and Dimnah (2013)

=== Short stories ===
- Me and My Electric (1998)
- Hot Rock Mountain (2004)

=== The Ethiopian Story Collecting Project ===
Laird set up The Ethiopian Story Collecting Project in 1996 in collaboration with Michael Sargent, the British Council in Ethiopia and the Ethiopian Ministry of Education with the aim of creating reading materials in English for use in Ethiopian schools. Stories were collected in every region, amounting to over 300 in total. They were published in English and Amharic on www.ethiopianfolktales.com. A further website, www.ethiopianfolktalesforkids.com, contains a selection of the stories in simplified English with accompanying exercises and sound narration.

Laird's account of her travels, the storytellers and the stories themselves was published by Birlinn in 2009 under the title The Lure of the Honey Bird.

== Awards and nominations ==
- Red Sky in the Morning – Highly Commended for the Carnegie Medal.
- Hiding Out – Winner of the Smarties Young Judges Award.
- Jake's Tower – Shortlisted for the Carnegie Medal and the Guardian Children's Fiction Prize.
- The Garbage King – Winner of the Scottish Arts Council Children's Book of the Year award and the Stockport Book award. It has also been shortlisted for the Carnegie Medal, the Blue Peter Award, the Salford Children's Book Award, the Calderdale Children's Book Award, the Lincolnshire Young People's Book Award, the Stockton Children's Book of the Year, the West Sussex Children's Book Award, the Portsmouth Book Award and the Sheffield Children's Book Award.
- A Little Piece of Ground – Winner of the Hampshire Book Award and has been shortlisted for the Southern Schools Book Award.
