= Sonia Nimr =

Palestinian writer, ethnographer and academic (born 1955)

- سونيا نمر
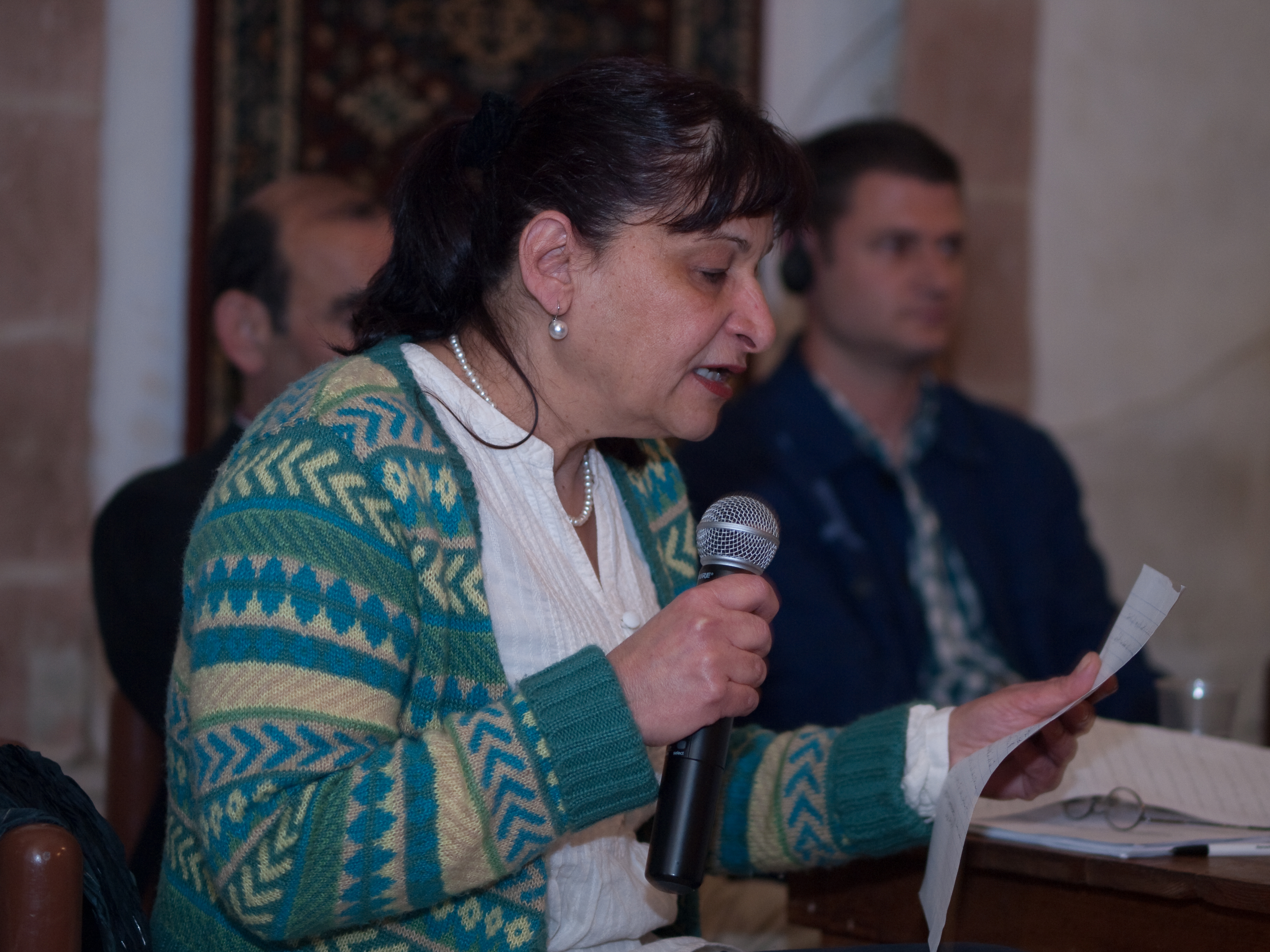
- Born: Jenin
- Occupations: Writer, oral historian, storyteller, ethnographer
- Notable work: A Little Piece of Ground; Wondrous Journeys in Strange Lands; Thunderbird
- Awards: Etisalat Award for Arabic Children's Literature; International Board on Books for Young People (IBBY) Honor List; Sharjah Children's Book Award

Sonia Nimr (Arabic: سونيا نمر; born 1955) is a Palestinian writer, storyteller, translator, ethnographer and academic. She writes for children and youth in Arabic and English, and relates folk-tales in colloquial Arabic. She is the winner of the 2014 Etisalat Award for Arabic Children's Literature for Best Young Adult Book for her book Extraordinary Journeys to Unknown Places. Nimr is an Associate Professor of Philosophy and Cultural Studies at Birzeit University.

== Background ==
Nimr was born in Jenin in 1955, where she finished her elementary and secondary studies. She then continued to enrol at Birzeit University, where she joined the burgeoning student struggle against the Israeli occupation. During her second year there, in 1975, she was arrested by Israeli military forces for her political activism, and sentenced to three years in an Israeli prison. During her imprisonment, she developed her interest in writing children's literature. She later moved to the United Kingdom to continue her studies, and in 1990, she received her PhD in Oral history from Exeter University. She began writing only in 1986, while working as an education officer at the Museum of Mankind, in England. Her first works were renderings of Palestinian folk tales, and were published in Arabic. She lived in the UK for years, Nimr encountered different views regarding Arab women. She has stated that this is one of the main reasons that most of the heroes of her stories are women and girls, to fight the harmful stereotypes and empower Arab girls. She credits her mother for instilling in her both her love of writing and her political militancy, and in both she connects between feminism and national liberation, stating "If we liberate women, we will have taken a step towards the liberation of Palestine."

After her return home, in 1990, Nimr was imprisoned once again. She wrote her first two stories for children while incarcerated, but her work was confiscated by the prison officials. Her experience as an activist and prisoner inform her writing, and she uses the speaking opportunities afforded her as a writer to speak about Palestine and war zones. Nimr also speaks about the physical, psychological and sexual torture of female prisoners in Israeli prisons, and about the women-led prisoner resistance in which she also took part.

Writing in both English and Arabic, Nimr views her writing as a mission on behalf of Palestinian children, as well as for all children living in conflict zones. She has expressed her commitment "to exercising their imagination and keeping them in touch with their cultural heritage". In her work on folk tales, Nimr tries to "rewrite" the stories for children, as they were originally intended for adults, while "keeping the spirit, the magic." Her use of colloquial language in her writing caused some controversy, as publishers want to sell books in multiple markets in the Arabic-speaking world, and Standard Arabic is the form generally used in written form.

She first received recognition for her 2003 book A Little Piece of Ground, written with Elizabeth Laird, which tells the story of the occupied West Bank as seen through the eyes of a 12-year-old boy. A Little Piece of Ground was written in English, and then translated into Arabic, several European languages and Japanese. It was nominated for the CILIP Carnegie Medal in the UK and included in the 2004 IBBY Honour List. Her 2004 book, The Story that Begins and Ends in Lies was also on the IBBY Honour List, In 2007, Ghaddar the Ghoul and other Palestinian Stories came out in English. Her next international success was Wondrous Journeys to Strange Lands, published in 2013 and translated to several languages. It won the 2014 Etisalat Award for Arabic Children's Literature for Best Young Adult Book and was included in the 2014 IBBY Honour List. The book has been described as a "feminist-fable-plus-historical-novel... for all ages". In 2017, the first instalment of a planned fantasy trilogy for young adults came out, Thunderbird -- a time-travel adventure following Noor and her 16th century friend, Andaleeb, in their effort to reach Jerusalem and save the world. The translation to English by Marcia Lynx Qualey came out in 2020. Thunderbird was short-listed for the 2017 Etisalat Award for Arabic Children's Literature. It won the Sharjah Children's Book Award in the Young Adult category in 2018, and was short-listed for the Sheikh Zayed Book Award.

Nimr lives in Ramallah, and teaches at the Department of Cultural Studies at Birzeit University.

== Notable works ==
Children and Young Adult

- A Little Piece of Ground (with Elizabeth Laird), 2003
- Rihlat Ajeeba Fi Al Bilad Al Ghareeba (Wondrous Journeys to Strange Lands), Tamer Institute 2013
- Qisah Awalha khayal wa Akherha Khyal (A Story that Begins and Ends with Lies), 2012
- Ghaddar the Ghoul and Other Palestinian Stories, Frances Lincoln Children's Books, London 2007
- Thunderbird, Tamer Institute 2017

Academic and non-fiction

- The Arab revolt of 1936–1939 in Palestine: a study based on oral sources, University of Exeter, 1990
- يالو : بحث الأطفال في ذاكرة الكبار (Yalu: Children's Examination of Adult Memory), with Nadiah Aruri; Tamer Institute, 2000
- "Sa’id Nimr’s Stormy Career: From the Dungeons of Istanbul to the Ranks of Faisal’s Arab Army", Jerusalem Quarterly, Spring 2007, Issue 30, pp 77–87
- "A Nation in a Hero: Abdul Rahim Hajj Muhammad and the Arab Revolt", Struggle and Survival in Palestine/Israel, Mark LeVine, Gershon Shafir, University of California Press, 2012
- "Fast Forward to the Past: A Look into Palestinian Collective Memory", Cahiers de littérature orale, (20081201): 338–349
- "Oral History and Palestinian Collective Memory", Oral History, v21 n1 (19930401): 54–61

== Awards ==
- 2003 Carnegie Medal nomination / A Little Piece of Ground
- 2004 IBBY Honour List / A Little Piece of Ground
- 2014 Etisalat Award for Arabic Children's Literature Best Young Adult Book / Wondrous Journeys to Strange Lands
- 2014 IBBY Honor List / Wondrous Journeys to Strange Lands
- 2017 Etisalat Award for Arabic Children's Literature Shortlist for Best Young Adult Book / Thunderbird
- 2018 Sharjah Children's Book Award, Young Adults / Thunderbird
- 2018 short list for the Sheikh Zayed Book Award / Thunderbird
