= Nasra Al Adawi =

Omani writer and poet

Nasra Al Adawi is an Omani writer and poet.

Born in Zanzibar, Nasra started writing poems in Arabic before switching to English. She has published three books of poetry, which have helped create greater public awareness about cancer. She writes for the Omani women's magazine Al Mar'a.

== Works ==
- Collective Thoughts, 2002.
- Within Myself: The Will Power To Live beyond Cancer, 2004
- Brave Faces: The Daring Stand Against Cancer. Muscat: man Printers, 2007.

== See also ==
- Khawla al-Zahiri
- Fatimah Muhammad Sha'ban
- Huda Hamed

== Sources ==
- journals.squ.edu.om
