= Red Sky in the Morning =

1988 novel by Elizabeth Laird

- First edition (UK)
- Author: Elizabeth Laird
- Language: English
- Genre: Children novel
- Publisher: William Heinemann Ltd
- Publication date: 1988
- Publication place: United Kingdom
- Media type: Print (Hardback)

Red Sky in the Morning is a young adult novel by Elizabeth Laird, first published in 1988. The novel was published as Loving Ben in its initial American release.

== Plot ==
Anna is happy when her parents announce to her that they are having a baby. She sees this as her opportunity to show that she is grown-up and can take care of the family. But Ben's birth is overshadowed by the fact that he is born with Hydrocephalus. At first, Anna finds it extremely hard to cope with the new situation, but she really loves Ben and does her very best to take care of him. At school, she has problems explaining to people what is wrong with her brother because she thinks that they will not understand and she doesn't want their sympathy.

Soon after Ben "meets" Anna's school-mate, Miranda, for the first time, the word of him being disabled quickly spreads to the rest of Anna's classmates. Anna becomes angry, but then breaks down, and all her friends feel sympathetic toward her. After one of the popular girls, Debbie, comes to visit him, Anna realises that she should not be ashamed of Ben and that all her schoolmates love him too, especially Miranda. During the summer, due to Ben's disability, the family can't afford to go on a holiday. To compensate the girls for their disappointment, Mr Peacock signs them up for some summer activities, and in the end they both go for tennis coaching.

During one of her coaching sessions, Anna meets Tony through Miranda, who became her good friend, and instantly becomes infatuated with him due to his looks. And throughout the whole summer, she is always looking out for him. Once school starts again with all the classes switched around, Anna finds she's in a literature class with Mrs Hamilton, who keeps up with the trend despite her age. Anna aspires to be like and admires her. After Miranda meets Ben, she adores him and frequently visits Ben. During one of her visits, Anna learns about Miranda's sad family background, and when Mrs Peacock later speaks about Miranda, Anna gets upset and calls her intolerant. Later when Miranda comes around on Saturday, Anna finds out Miranda has her sights on Tony too, and gets a little annoyed with her.

Then soon after, Anna is invited to the youth club and is reluctant to go at first, but after one trip she realises she enjoys it. Through the youth club she gets to know Jeff, whom she thought has invited her on a date at first, but the vicar at the youth club got the name wrong, and through this she realised she might not actually have real feelings for Tony. In the next chapter, it mainly centres around Katy's obsession with her birthday. When Mrs Peacock denies her a birthday party, Katy gets upset and Anna butts in, trying to resolve the situation by volunteering to plan the party herself. Katy is really grateful to Anna for helping her.

Later after the party, Mr and Mrs Peacock discuss about the difficulties with Ben and in order to be at home more, Mr Peacock promises to get a new job. Everything slowly falls into place for the family. Anna then decides to get a job but gets her chances sabotaged by Emma. Later when Anna is buying envelopes from Mrs Chapman, Mrs Chapman instead decides to hire Anna. Through this job, Anna meets all kind of people and learns what it is like to be a shopkeeper.

Then after Katy got a fever, she spreads it to Anna and Ben too. Due to his disability, even a small illness like this caused him to have difficulties breathing, and he passes away. Anna has trouble coping with the news and does not know how to respond until her dad comes home and they cry together. At first she doesn't confide in her schoolmates but after Debbie, in her straightforward manner, gets Anna to confide in her, she breaks down and after the lesson is over she feels better. After that, Katy gives Ben one of her most beloved toys and Anna feels closer to Katy after this.

When she is at her job she sees a little girl who reminds her of Ben.

The story progresses with how Anna copes with Ben's death when he was 2 and meets Jackie who turns out to be Tony's handicapped sister.

== Inspiration ==
Elizabeth Laird wrote Red Sky in the Morning because of her little brother Alistair. Laird says in the preface: "But there's one exception to my usual rule. The character of Ben in this book is my brother Alistair." The other characters, Anna, Katy, Anna's school friends and her Mum and Dad, are made up. Her family in Red Sky in the Morning is nothing like her real family.

== Awards and nominations ==
- Highly Commended for the Carnegie Medal
