= Nabiha Mhiedly =

Lebanese writer of children's stories

- Born: 1962 (age 63–64); Beirut, Lebanon
- Education: B.A. in Biology. B.A. in Journalism. M.A. in Education
- Occupations: Writer and editor of 'touta touta' and 'ahmed' magazines
- Notable work: 'I Love', 'The Creatures of Room Ceiling', and 'Abo Kharkouba'.

Nabiha Mhiedly (Arabic: نبيهة محيدلي) is a Lebanese writer who was born in 1962, Beirut, Lebanon. She has published over 100 children stories. Mhiedly is a three-time winner of Etisalat Children's Literature Award as she won the award in 2009, for her book ‘I Love’, in 2012, for ‘The Creatures of The Room Ceiling’, and for ‘Abo Khrkoba’ in 2019.

== Biography ==
Mhiedly was born in 1962, in Beirut. She holds a B.A. in biology and a B.A. in journalism from Lebanese University. She also holds an M.A. in education from Saint Joseph University. Mhiedly is the editor of two children magazines (i.e. ‘Touta Touta’ and ‘Ahmed’). In 1998, she established ‘Dar Alhadaeq’ which is a publishing house that distributes books and magazines for children. She has won the Etisalat Children's Literature Award three times. The first time was in 2009, 2012, and in 2019 for her books ‘I Love’, ‘The Creatures of The Room Ceiling’, and for ‘Abo Khrkoba’, respectively.

== Works ==
Mhiedly has published several stories for children, for example:

- Mohtady’s Diaries 1 (Original title: Yaomyat Mohtady 1), 1997
- Ghassan Knows What Pollution Is (Original title: GhasSan Yaerif Ma Hwa Talwuth), 1999
- How’s The weather? (original title: Kifa Halu Ldjaw?), 2009
- The Story of The Book (Original title: Qissatul Kitab), 2009
- Sadness and Happiness (Original title: Huzen Wa Farah), 2009
- Marmer’s Finger (Original title: Isba’a Maramer), 2010
- The Creatures of Room Ceiling (Original title: Kaenat Saqful Ghourfa), 2011
- I Love (Original title: Ana Oheb), 2011
- Prudence- Caution- Cleverness- Self-confidence (Original title: Alhytta- Alhadar-Addaka’a- Athiqa bel-nnafs), 2011
- Iddher wa Ban.. Alika Alaman, 2012
- Best Stories (Original title: Ahsan Alqisas), 2013
- The Story Behind The Proverb (Original title: Qissat Mathl), 2013

== Awards ==
The awards that Mhiedly has won are:

- The Arab Journalism Award for ‘Touta Touta’ magazine.
- Etisalat Children's Literature Award for ‘Ana Oheb’, 2009
- Etisalat Children's Literature Award for ‘The Creatures of Ceiling Room’, 2012
- Etisalat Children's Literature Award for ‘Abo Kherkoba’ for best directing, 2019
