= Jake's Tower =

2001 young adult novel by Elizabeth Laird

- First edition
- Author: Elizabeth Laird
- Language: English
- Genre: Children novel
- Publisher: Macmillan Children's Books
- Publication date: 2001
- Publication place: UK, US
- Media type: Print (Hardback)
- Pages: 160
- ISBN: 0-333-96215-X

Jake's Tower is a 2001 young adult novel written by Elizabeth Laird. The book was shortlisted for the Carnegie Medal and the Guardian Children's Fiction Prize.

The main protagonist is Jake, a teenager living with his mom and his step-father in England. His step-father is violent and often in the pub, so Jake and his mother go to his paternal grandfather's home. The novel showcases the problems of a teenager with a violent father.

== Plot summary ==
Everyday life for Jake is a struggle due to his mother's horrible and violent boyfriend, Steve. To escape his problems, Jake dreams of having his own tall tower where he can be peaceful and safe. In his pretend tower he daydreams of his father, who gave him a hug and a fluffy duck when he was born. Though certain he will never see him again, Jake believes that he might somehow get to meet him one day.

But when the struggle becomes too much for Jake and his mother, they run away from Steve to Jake's grandmother (his father's mother, Mrs. Judd). While Mrs. Judd had not believed that Jake was her grandson, upon meeting him she sees his resemblance to his father and accepts and protects him from the danger that he is in. However, Jake's mother insists on fighting for Jake's custody, resulting in a case conference between Jake's mother and his grandmother. And top the Tower Named Thomas the Tower (TTT) Meanwhile, Jake befriends Kieran, a boy from school, and they agree to go to and from school with each other. When Kieran is sick one day, Jake takes a shortcut, only to be apprehended by the one person he did not want to meet: Steve. Steve grabs Jake, but immediately releases him when Jake's teacher come out. However, when his teacher leaves, Steve starts to intimidate Jake again. Jake manages to escape to his grandmother's house, where Mrs. Judd manages to get rid of Steve when he follows Jake.

The following day Jake returns home from school while Mrs. Judd and his mother are at his case conference. Suddenly the door opens - standing at the living room door is Jake's father.
