= Walid Taher =

Egyptian writer and designer

- Born: 1969 (age 56–57); Cairo, Egypt
- Occupations: Author, designer of children's books, journalist painter, plastic artist
- Awards: Etisalat Award for Arabic Children's Literature for 'The Black Spot' in 2010; The Annual Arabic Children's Book Award, Read Here, There and Everywhere, from the Anna Lindh Foundation for ‘Animals’ Dreams’ in 2011

Walid Taher (Arabic : وليد طاهر) is an Egyptian author, designer of children's books, plastic artist, and journalist painter. He was born in Cairo, Egypt in 1969. More than 40 children books were published by Taher including: ‘The Black Spot’ which has won the Etisalat Award in its second edition. His book ‘Seven Souls’ was longlisted for Sheikh Zayed Award – Children and Young People's Literature Section in 2012. ‘The Island of Sailor Barakat’, additionally, was nominated for the Etisalat Award- Best Direction Section in 2019.

== Biography ==
Walid Taher is an Egyptian author who writes and designs children books. He, as well, works as a plastic artist and journalist painter. Taher was born in Cairo, Egypt in 1969. In his early life, he grew up in Ad Doqi, but then he moved to Maadi. Taher graduated from the faculty of Fine arts, Department of Décor. His career started in early 90s, as he worked, before his graduation, in Sabah Al Khair Magazine. Furthermore, he worked in several well-known newspapers and organizations including Al-Dostor Newspaper, Nahdet Misr Newspaper, UNICEF, and WHO. Taher is currently working as a journalist painter in Shorouk News and artistic director in Dar Al Shorouk.

Taher kicked off his career in the field of children's literature in 2001, when Dar Al Shorouk published his first book ‘My New Friend’. The book got second place in The Egyptian Board on Books for Young People Competition for Professionals. Taher, so far has more than 40 books for children, many of which are award-winning including ‘Black Spot’ which won the Etisalat Award in 2010 and ‘Animals’ Dreams’ that won The Annual Arabic Children's Book Award, Read Here, There and Everywhere, from the Anna Lindh Foundation in 2011.

Taher's career in children's literature field is not limited to writing stories only, but he also illustrates children books; for example: ‘The Watermelon’ written by Taghreed Najjar. In 1999, Taher got first place in The Egyptian Board on Books for Young People Competition for Professionals for illustrating ‘The Watermelon’.

Currently, Taher is working in a project with ‘Le Port a Jauni’, a French publishing house. The project aims to publish bilingual children book series, to break cultural barriers between children of Arabic and French culture. With ‘Le Port a Jauni’ Taher has published several books including ‘A country: Voyage without Baggage’, ‘The Dancers’, and ‘My Crazy Ideas’.

Taher believes that children have their own and unique experience, gained from interaction with the surrounding environment; hence, this is why Taher's books focuses on the question rather than on the answer. He assumes that it is an unfortunate step for the author of children's stories to pretend that he knows everything and provide children with lessons in such a silly and traditional way. It became a must for the writer to involve the child in the story and make him interact with the events, characters, or drawings. This involvement, in his point of view, requires paying attention to both the scenario and the illustration of the book.

Taher has six art galleries, four of them were held in Egypt and two in France. His most recent exhibition "Fades Away" was held in Egypt in 2022.

He, additionally, has conducted many workshops for children in different parts of the world, such as Paris, Marseille, Cairo, Dubai, and Munich.

== Works ==
Taher has more than 40 books for children for instance:

- My New Pal (Original title: Sahibi El Jadid), 2001 (ISBN: 9770907308)
- Fizo Is Happy Now (Original title: Fizo Asbaha Saidan), 2003 (ISBN: 13 9789770925096)
- The Morons (Original title: Al-Aghbiyaa), 2007
- The Black Spot (Original title: Al-Noqta Al-Soda), 2009 (ISBN: 13 9789770926115)
- My Beautiful Letters (Original title: Horoufy Al-Gamila), 2010
- Animals’ Dreams (Original title: Ahlam Al-Hayawanat), 2010

== Awards ==
Some of Taher's awards include:

2001: Egyptian Board on Books for Young People Competition for Professionals (second place) for ‘My New Pal’.

2010: Etisalat Award for ‘The Black Spot’.

2011: The Annual Arabic Children's Book Award, Read Here, There and Everywhere, from the Anna Lindh Foundation for ‘Animals’ Dreams’

== Nominations ==
- ‘Seven Souls’ was longlisted for Sheikh Zayed Award – Children and Young People's Literature and Translation Section (2012).
- ‘The Island of Sailor Barakat’ was nominated for the Etisalat Award- Best Direction Section (2019).
