= Crusade (Laird novel) =

2007 novel by Elizabeth Laird

- First edition
- Author: Elizabeth Laird
- Language: English
- Genre: Children novel
- Publisher: Macmillan
- Publication date: 2007
- Publication place: Great Britain, United States
- Media type: Print (hardback)

Crusade is a novel written by Elizabeth Laird and first published by Macmillan in 2007. It is set in the Third Crusade and focuses on a Saracen boy named Salim and an English boy named Adam. It was shortlisted for the 2007 Costa Children's Book Award and nominated for Carnegie Medal (2008).
