= Balcony on the Moon =

2018 book by Ibtisam Barakat

- Author: Ibtisam Barakat
- Genre: Memoir, Biography
- Publisher: Margaret Ferguson/Farrar, Straus & Giroux
- Publication date: October 25, 2016
- Pages: 240
- ISBN: 978-0-374-30251-1

Balcony on the Moon: Coming of Age in Palestine is a 2018 YA nonfiction book by Palestinian-American author Ibtisam Barakat. It is a stand-alone companion to her critically acclaimed first memoir: Tasting the Sky, A Palestinian Childhood.

Balcony on the Moon was a 2017 American Library Association Amelia Bloomer Top Ten book,2017 Notable Book for a Global Society; a Junior Library Guild Official Selection, and an honorable mention for the 2017 Children/Young Adult Arab American Book Award.

It has been widely reviewed.
