= Amal Naseer =

Jordanian writer, literary critic, and academic

- Born: Amal Taher Mohamed Naseer; 9 September 1959; Irbid, Jordan
- Known for: writer, literary critic, and academic

Amal Taher Mohamed Naseer (9 September 1959) is a Jordanian writer, literary critic, and academic. She holds a doctorate in literature and criticism from the University of Jordan. She is the first woman to have a doctorate from her department at the University of Jordan.

== Life ==
Naseer was born on 9 September 1959 in the Jordanian city of Irbid. She completed her secondary education at the Tiberias School in Irbid in 1977. She received her bachelor's degree in Arabic language and literature in 1982 from Yarmouk University. In the same year she received a diploma in higher education. In 1987 she received her master's degree in literature and criticism, going on to receive her doctorate in literature and criticism from the University of Jordan in 1995.

She has worked in the University of Mosteghanemi in Algeria, and served as a member of the Board of Trustees of the University of Applied Sciences, which operates the membership of the Board of Trustees at Al al-Bayt University since 2010. She is a member of the Jordanian Writers Association, the administrative body of the Jordanian Society for Science and Culture, and a member of the Cultural Forum in Irbid. She is also a member of the Centre for Women's Studies in Amman, and the International Council of the Arabic language in Lebanon.

On 23 May 2016 the President of Yarmouk University Dr. Refaat Faouri appointed Naseer as his assistant and director of the Center for Languages. In 2010, she was awarded the title of "model women" an award from the Union of Arab producers for television work in cooperation with the United Nations Population Fund. In the same year she won the "Ideal Arab Mother" Award of the State of Kuwait. On 5 September 2016, the Mayor of Los Angeles honoured Naseer with a certificate in recognition of her work and her efforts in education in Jordan.
