= Emirates Novel Award =

Coordinates: 24°25′46″N 54°27′20″E

- Awarded for: Emirati writers
- Date: Annual
- Location: United Arab Emirates
- Hosted by: Twofour54
- First award: 2014
- Website: http://www.emiratesnovelaward.com/

The Emirates Novel Award is a literary prize established in Abu Dhabi in 2013 in collaboration with media production company Twofour54. Emirati writer Jamal Al Shehhi is the Secretary General of the Award. The prize aims to support Emirati literary talents, highlight literary culture in the UAE community and highlight the importance of reading and writing.

The first-place winner of the Emirates Novel Award receives AED 60,000 (about US$16,000). All winning novels are made available in the major bookstores across the UAE as well as in e-book format.

== Award criteria ==
The Award includes three different categories: Best Novel, Best Short Novel, and Distinguished Emirati Writer. The selection committee will select three works from the Best Novel category for novels with no less than 40,000 words, and three other works from the Best Short Novel category for novels with between 17,000 and 40,000 words.
