= Fatimah Muhammad Sha'ban =

Omani writer

Fatimah Muhammad Sha'ban (born 1965) is an Omani writer. She was the first Omani woman to publish a short story collection.

== Works ==
- Tariq al-nadam [Experienced through Sorrow], 1994
- Maw'id ma'a al-qadar [Meeting through Destiny], 2001
