= Maya Fidawi =

Lebanese illustrator for Children's Books

- Born: Lebanon
- Education: American University of Beirut (B.A.)
- Years active: 2004–present

Maya Fidawi (Arabic: مايا فداوي), a Lebanese illustrator for children's books since 2000, graduated from the faculty of Arts from The Lebanese University. Some of her work won several Arab awards.

== Education and career ==
Maya Fidawi studied fine arts at the faculty of arts at the Lebanese University in 2000. She is fluent in several languages including Arabic, English, French, and Portuguese. Before starting her career as an illustrator of children's books, she worked in different areas including in Decorative drawings and miniatures, and advertising companies where she drew on walls of several homes and palaces in Lebanon, such as the Phoenicia Hotel and the old original Planet Hollywood.

Her career as a children's book illustrator started when she participated in a children's painting calendar event with an advertising company. One of the people present in the event was an owner of a publishing house. Delighted by the drawing of Fidawi, the owner contracted her to illustrate one of her books. Fidawi now has illustrated numerous books nationally and internationally outside the Arab world including Lebanon, UAE, Jordan, Morocco, Italy, Brazil, and New York.

Fidawi has an art atelier and art space named 1930 in Beirut, She has held, and continues to hold numerous illustration workshops for children and professional graphic illustrators in Istanbul, Abu Dhabi, Sharjah, Tangier, and Beirut and Egypt. Her drawings have also received many awards such as the Mahmoud Kahil award for cartoon artists, and the Etisalat Award for the best drawings under forty books in 2017, for her book “The Seven Day Lamb” which took place in Morocco.

== Awards ==
- 2012: Saudi International Book Fair Award for best illustration.
- 2012: Beirut International Book Fair Award for best illustration.
- 2013: Arab Though Foundation "Arabi 21" Award for illustration.
- 2014: Etisalat Award for Arabic Children's Literature for best drawings.
- 2017: Etisalat Award for Arabic Children's Literature for best drawings.
