= Dar AlHadaek =

Publishing company from Lebanon

Dar AlHadaek is a Lebanese company that publishes and distributes children's books and magazines in the Arab world. It was founded in 1987.

In the 1990s, Dar Al Hadaek started publishing Ahmad magazine for boys and girls ages eight to 14. It then started Touta Touta, the first magazine in the Arab world for children ages five to seven.

Official Logo of Dar AlHadaek

Dar Al Hadaek has received prizes for its books and participated in Arab and international book fairs. Its writers and illustrators have been present in fairs, workshops and specialized forums internationally.

Dar Al Hadaek is a member of the following bodies:

- Arab Children Book Publisher's Forum
- International Board on Books for Young People (IBBY)
- The syndicate of Lebanese publishers
- The syndicate of Arab publishers.

== Publications ==
Dar Al Hadaek has published more than 350 books.

Ahmad magazine: it was founded in 1987. It is a monthly magazine of various interests for children between 8 and 14 years old. In 2008, the Dubai Press Club awarded Ahmad magazine the best journalistic work for children.

Ahmad Magazine

Touta Touta magazine: is the first magazine in the Arab world that is specialized in the age group between four and seven years. It was started in 2000. In 2006, the Dubai Press Club awarded Touta Touta the best journalistic work for children.

== Prizes ==
- The first Arab literary creative prize for children's books from the Arab Cultural Club- Beirut for the book The fish and the sea- 1993.
- Noma Concours for picture book illustrations- Japan- Asia/ Pacific organized by Asia Cultural Center for UNESCO (ACCU) for the book The newborn- 1994.
- The encouragement prize for the character of Tufaha by the fair that was organized by the Arab Center for Childhood and Development- Cairo-1996.
- The prize of the Sharjah International Book Fair for the best writer, illustrator and publisher for the book My friend who loves me a lot- 1996.
- The prize of the Lebanese Board on Books for Young People for the book A day out of School- 1997.
- The prize of the Lebanese Board on Books for Young People for the book The clouds Does not Rain Toys- 1998.
- The prize of the Lebanese Board on Books for Young People for the book When the Storm Blows- 1999.
- Choosing the book Ghassan Knows the Most Beautiful Place among the White Ravens International Youth Library, Munich, list of 2004.
- An honoring from the Mayor of Sharjah Sultan bin Muhammad Al-Qasimi during Sharjah Book Exhibition in 2005.
- The Arab Press award of the Dubai Press Club for Touta Touta magazine as the best work for children in 2006.
- An honoring by the Lebanese Culture Minister Tarek Mitri in 2006.
- The first prize of the Arabic Culture Club for the best-designed book in Beirut International Exhibition for the book Two tales in 2007.
- Choosing the book What Does Yasser Want to Say among the White Ravens International Youth Library, Munich, list of 2007.
- The Arab Press award of the Dubai Press Club for Ahmad magazine as the best work for children in 2008.
- Award of the Arabic Culture Club for the best-designed book in Beirut International Exhibition for the book the Alphabet of Animals in 2008.
- Etisalat Prize from the Arab Children's Book Publishers Forum for the book I Love in 2009.
- Nominating the book Friends that are Enemies in the IBBY honor list of 2010 regarding the best illustrations.
- The selection for "The Best fiction book for children with special needs" competition, organized by the Anna Lindh Foundation for the book Bilal and Amer in 2010.
- Assabil prize for the book Yasser’s Shopping List regarding the best text written for children (6-12) in 2010.
- Choosing the book Thus the Colors Change among the White Ravens International Youth Library, Munich, list of 2011.

Toota Toota Magazine

== Participating in book fairs ==
Dar Al Hadaek participates in local fairs including the Beirut International Book Fair. In addition to 50 school fairs and others organized by educational institutes. In the Arab world,

it participates in the book fairs: Doha, Sharjah, Kuwait, Muscat, Riyadh, Abu Dhabi and Bahrain. It also participates in the Frankfurt book fair, Paris book fair, London book fair and Bologna book fair.
