= Celestial Bodies =

2010 novel by Jokha Alharthi

- First English edition
- Author: Jokha Alharthi
- Original title: سيدات القمر
- Translator: Marilyn Booth
- Language: Arabic
- Genre: Fiction
- Published: 2010 (Arabic); 2018 (English)
- Publisher: Dar al-Adab (Oman); Sandstone Press (England); Catapult Books (US)
- Media type: Print, digital
- Pages: 243
- Awards: International Booker Prize
- ISBN: 1912240165 (Sandstone Press)

Celestial Bodies (Arabic: سيدات القمر, romanized: Sayyidat al-Qamar, lit. 'Ladies of the Moon') is a 2010 novel by Omani author Jokha Alharthi. The novel follows the lives of three sisters and their unhappy marriages in al-Awafi, Oman.

The novel has been translated into over 20 languages and marks the first novel by an Omani woman to be translated into English, as well as the first Omani novel to be translated to Italian. The original novel won the Best Omani Novel Award in 2010 and was longlisted for the Sheikh Zayed Book Award in the 'Young Author' category in 2011. In 2019, the English translation was awarded the International Booker Prize, with Alharthi and translator Marilyn Booth equally sharing the £50,000 prize. Celestial Bodies is also the first novel to be translated from Arabic to win the prize.

== Reception ==
Kirkus Reviews described Celestial Bodies as "a richly layered, ambitious work that teems with human struggles and contradictions, providing fascinating insight into Omani history and society", while Publishers Weekly expressed that the novel "rewards readers willing to assemble the pieces of Alharthi’s puzzle into a whole, and is all the more satisfying for the complexity of its tale."

The New Yorker stated that Alharthi "gives each chapter, in loose rotation, to the voice of a single character, and so makes contemporary female interiority crucial to her book while accommodating a variety of very different world views", while The Irish Times commented that the novel "deftly undermines recurrent stereotypes about Arab language and cultures but most importantly brings a distinctive and important new voice to world literature."
