= Khawla al-Zahiri =

Omani short story writer

Khawla Hamdan al-Zahiri (sometimes az-Zahiri or Azzahiri) (born December 21, 1969) is an Omani short story writer.

Al-Zahiri was born in Sohar. She received her bachelor's degree in education in 1991 from United Arab Emirates University. In 1998 one of her short stories received third prize in a competition sponsored by the Girls' Clubs in Sharjah; that same year her work appeared in the anthology Aswatuhunna (Their Voices), published in Beirut, of work by writers from the Arab states of the Persian Gulf. Her stories have been published in both her native country and in the United Arab Emirates.

== Works ==
- Saba`, 1998
