= Huda Hamed =

Omani writer (born 1981)

- هدى حمد
- Born: 1981 (age 44–45); Rustaq, Oman
- Education: University of Aleppo (BA)
- Occupations: Writer, journalist
- Years active: 2006–present
- Awards: Sharjah Award for Arab Creativity and Best Omani Publications (2009) for "Things Are Not Where They Should Be"

Huda Hamed (Arabic: هدى حمد) is an Omani writer and journalist born in 1981. She has published five collections of short stories and four novels. In 2009, her short story collection Things Are Not Where They Should Be won the Sharjah Award for Arab Creativity and Best Omani Publication.

== Biography ==
Huda Hamed was born in Rustaq, Oman in 1981. She graduated from the University of Aleppo with a bachelor's degree in Arabic literature. After graduation, she worked as a journalist in the cultural section of the Oman newspaper. Later, she served as editor-in-chief of Day and Day, the first Omani book-review website. She currently works as editor of the Omani cultural magazine Nazwa.

In 2009, her short story Things Are Not Where They Should Be, published by Dar al-Adab, won the Sharjah Award for Arab Creativity and also Best Omani Publication. Her novel Who Counts the Stairs was one of six novels written during Najwa Barakat's writers' workshop that was later published by Dar al-Adab.

== Works ==
=== Short-story collections ===
- Salty Gossip (Arabic title: Namima Maliha), 2006
- Not Exactly Like I Want It (Arabic title: Laysa Beldabt Kma Ureed), 2009
- The Orange Sign (Arabic title: Al Eshara Al Burtuqaliya), 2014
- Am I Only Who Ate the Apple? (Arabic title: Ana Al Waheed Al Lathi Akala Al Tufaha?), 2018
- The Wolf Contemplates Outside the Makeup Room (Taʼammal al-dhiʼb khārij ghurfat al-mikyāj), 2020

=== Novels ===
- Things Are Not Where They Should Be (Arabic title: Al Ashiaa Laysat Fi Makaniha), 2009
- She Who Counts the Stairs (Arabic title: Alati Ta’ud Al Salalim), 2014
- Cinderella of Muscat (Arabic title: Sandrella Al Muscat), 2016
- Our Names (Arabic title: Asamina), 2019
- They Don't Speak in Metaphor (Arabic title: La Yudhakarun fi Majaz), 2022

=== Works in translation ===
- I Saw Her in My Dreams, translated by Nadine Sinno and William Taggart, 2022

== Awards ==
- 2009: the short story Things Are Not Where They Should be won the Sharjah Award for Arab Creativity and Best Omani Publication in 2009.

== See also ==
- Jokha Alharthi
- Nasra Al Adawi
- Khawla al-Zahiri
