= Etisalat Award for Arabic Children's Literature =

Arabic literary award for children's literature

Etisalat Award for Arabic Children’s Literature is an Arabic literary award for children's literature. It was established in 2009 by the Arab Children's Book Publisher’s Forum. It is sponsored by Her Excellency Sheikha Bodour bint Sultan Al Qasimi, President of UAEBBY (United Arab Emirates Board on Books for Young People). Organization of the prize was handed over to UAEBBY in 2010. The award is announced each year during the Sharjah International Book Fair.

Entry is open to books that meet these criteria: the book must be written in Arabic; must be original (not translated, quoted or reproduced); and must have been published within the past three years. The book may not have received any previous local, regional or international awards, and the content must not violate the values, traditions and customs of Arab communities. Entry is open to children's books that target the age group from 0 to 14 years, and each publishing house is entitled to nominate a maximum of three titles.

The prize is for DH 1,000,000 which is split with 50% divided between the author and/or illustrator, and 50% to the publisher. From 2009-2012, it was one of the richest literary prizes in the world for a single winner.

Starting in 2013, the award was significantly restructured with new categories and a splitting of the 1,000,000 AED award as follows.

- Best Text 100,000 AED
- Best Illustration 100,000 AED
- Best Production 100,000 AED
- Best Children's Book of the Year 300,000 AED (split between author, illustrator and publisher)
- Best Young Adult Book of the Year 200,000 AED (split between author and publisher)
- Etisalat Award Workshops for Children’s Books 200,000 AED

== Winners ==
2009-2013 (winner received 1,000,000 AED)

Year	Author	Title	Illustrator	Publisher	Country	Notes
2009	Nabiha Muhaidali	Ana Oheb ("I Love")	Nadeen Saidani	Dar Al Hadaeq	Lebanon	
2010	Walid Taher	Al Noqta Al Sawda ("The Black Dot")	Walid Taher	Dar El Shorouk	Egypt	
2011	Amani Al Ashmawi	Teari Ya Tayara (Fly Away Kite)		Nahdet Misr	Egypt	
2012	Nabiha Mheidly	Creatures on the Ceiling	Hassan Zahreddine	Hadaek Group	Lebanon	

2013

- Best Children's Book of the Year: Rod of Racemes by Egypt-based Nahdet Misr Publishing House, authored by Afaf Tobala and illustrated by Hanadi Sleet
- Best Young Adult Book of the Year: Ajwan by Egypt-based Nahdet Misr Publishing House, authored by Emirati writer Noura al Noman
- Best Text: My Mum Jadida by UAE writer Mariam Suhail Al Rashedi
- Best Illustration: Rod of Racemes by illustrator Hanadi Sleet
- Best Production: When You Get Angry by Lebanon-based Asala Publishing House

2014

- Best Children's Book of the Year: Naughty Kitty by Abeer Ibrahim Taher and illustrated by Maya Fidawi
- Best Young Adult Book of the Year: Extraordinary Journeys to Unknown Places by Sonia Nimr and illustrated by Lubna Taha
- Best Text: My Mom Loves Fattoosh by Eva Kosma and illustrated by Azza Hussein
- Best Illustration: The Pomegranate Girl by Rania Zbib Daher and illustrated by Joelle Achkar
- Best Production: Clever Walker by Nabiha Mheidly and illustrated by Hassan Zahreddine

2015

- Best Children's Book of the Year: The Judge's Mule by Shafeek Mehdi and illustrated by Taiba Abdullah
- Best Young Adult Book of the Year: Getting out of the Bubble by Ibrahim Shalabi
- Best Text: Me and My Granny written and illustrated by Ebtihaj Al Harthi
- Best Illustration: Nour Runs Away from the Story written by Abeer Ali Al Kalbani and illustrated by Gulnar Hajo
- Best Production: The Judge's Mule by Shafeek Mehdi and illustrated by Taiba Abdullah

2016

- Best Children's Book of the Year: Excuse Me, Give Me Away by Nabiha Mheidli
- Best Young Adult Book of the Year: Screams Behind Doors by Rania Hussien Amin
- Best Text: I Want to Be a Turtle by Amal Farah
- Best Illustration: The Blue Lake of Questions, written by Maya Abu Al-Hayat
- Best Production: Boulqash, authored and illustrated by Yara Bamiya

2018

- Best Children's Book of the Year: Homesick (الحنين) written by Aisha al-Harthi and illustrated by Hassan Manasra from Dar al-Alam al-Arabi
- Best Young Adult Book of the Year: The Secret of Oil (سر الزيت) written by Walid Daqqa from the Tamer Institute
- Best Text: Mama My Classmate (ماما بنت صفي) written by Lubna Taha and illustrated by Maya Fadawi from Al Salwa Books
- Best Illustration: Think of Others by Mahmoud Darwish and illustrated by Sahar Abdullah from Tanmia Publishing House
- Best Production: Koozy (كوزي) by Anastasia Qarawani and illustrated by Maja Kastelic from Al Salwa Books

2019

- Best Children's Book of the Year:
- Best Young Adult Book of the Year:
- Best Text:
- Best Illustration:
- Best Production:

2020

- Best Children's Book of the Year: A Tale Within a Tale Within a Tale written by Hadil Ghoneim and illustrated by Sahar Abdallah for Shahrazizi’s Nights: Published by Dar al-Balsam in Egypt
- Best Young Adult Book of the Year: شقائق النعمان (The Poppy Anemone), by Haya Saleh, published by Al Yasmine for Publishing and Distribution in Jordan.
- Best Text: Words by Syria’s Jikar Khorshid. The book was illustrated by Maha Daher.
- Best Illustration: The Monster and Me, illustrated by Baraa Al Awour and written by Aisha Abdullah Al Harithi
- Best Production: I’ll Be Okay, by Essam Asmir and Lama Azmar, illustrated by Hanane al-Kai, and published by Jabal Amman in Jordan.

== See also ==
- Emirates Telecommunications Corporation
- Etisalat Prize for Literature
