= Tamer Institute for Community Education =

Educational institution in Palestine

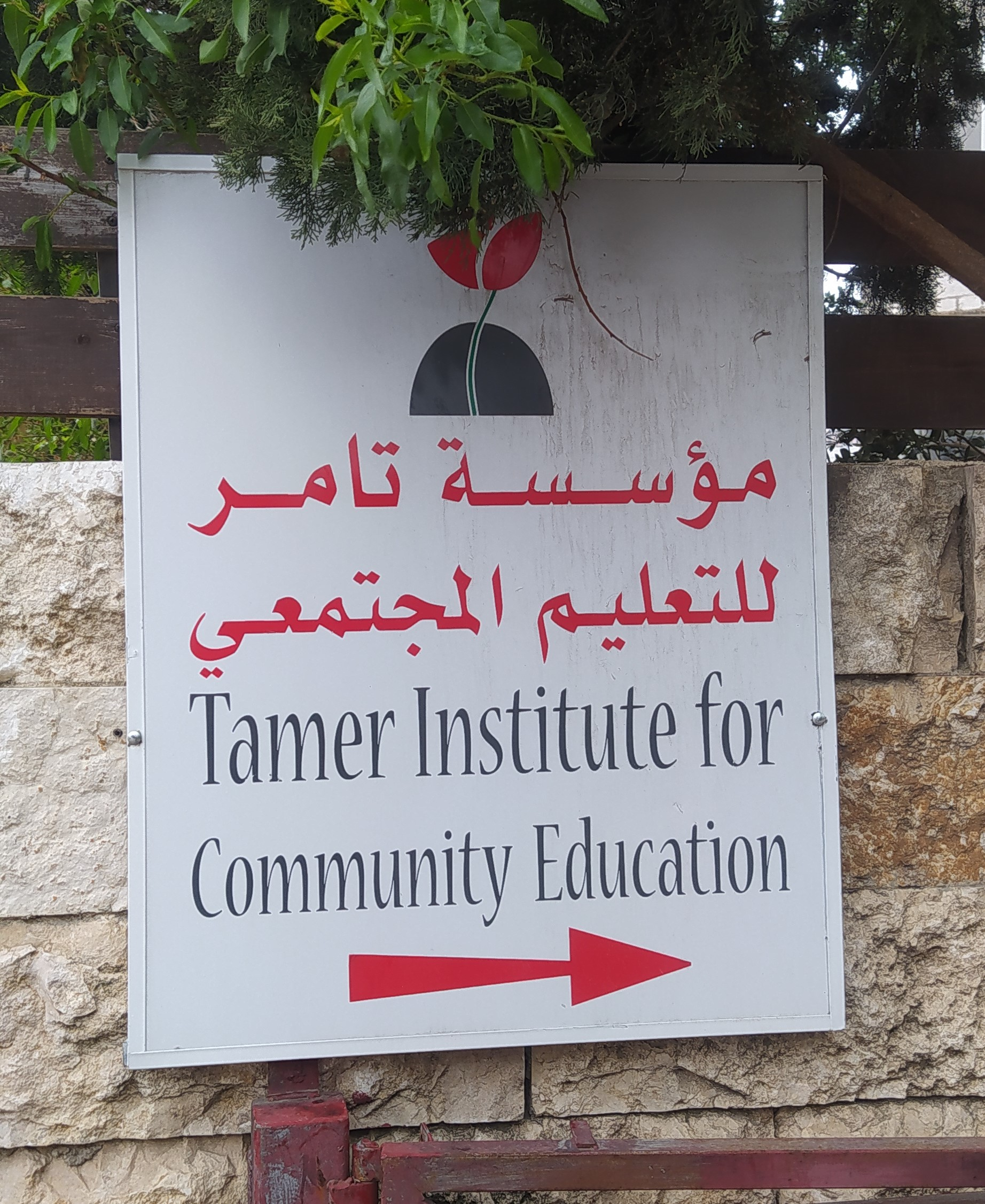
Tamer Institute for Community Education

The Tamer Institute for Community Education (Arabic: مؤسسة تامر للتعليم المجتمعي) is a non-profit non-governmental educational organization working in Palestine. It was established in 1989 in response to Palestinian needs during the first intifada. Tamer runs a publishing unit, publish a newsletter, hold courses for librarians, arranges workshops, donate books to local libraries and arranges an annual reading - and writing campaign.

== Astrid Lindgren Memorial Award ==
In 2009, the Tamer Institute won the biggest prize in children's literature (five million SEK, approximately 460,000 EUR), the Astrid Lindgren Memorial Award from the Swedish Arts Council, recognising its "long-term sustainable work" as a promoter of reading. It is one of two institutions to win the award (2003 to 2012).
