= Sami Ahmed Khalid =

Sudanese Pharmacognosy Professor

Professor Sami Ahmed Khalid FAAS FTWAS
- سامى أحمد خالد
- Born: Omdurman, Sudan
- Scientific career
- Fields: Phytochemistry; Drug discovery Neglected tropical diseases
- Institutions: University of Khartoum; University of Science and Technology (Sudan)

Sami Ahmed Khalid FAAS FTWAS (Arabic: سامى أحمد خالد) is a Sudanese pharmacognosy professor at the University of Science and Technology.

== Education and research ==
Khalid was born in Omdurman, Sudan. He completed a bachelor's and master's degree in pharmacognosy from the University of Szeged between 1968 and 1974. He returned to Sudan and joined the Department of Pharmacognosy at the University of Khartoum in 1977 as a teaching assistant.

Khalid started his Doctor of Philosophy in 1979 at the Department of Pharmaceutical Chemistry, University of Strathclyde, and finished in 1982. He then again returned to Sudan and joined the Department of Pharmacognosy at the University of Khartoum as an assistant professor. He became an associate professor in 1985 and was awarded the Alexander von Humboldt fellowship from the Department of Structural Chemistry, Ruhr University Bochum, in 1987. He later returned to Sudan to become a professor at the University of Khartoum in 1992.

Khalid became the dean of the Faculty of Pharmacy between 1992 and 1994. As of November 2022, Khalid is the dean of the Faculty of Pharmacy at the University of Science and Technology (Sudan).

Khalid is a scientific adviser for the International Foundation for Science (IFS).

== Awards and honours ==
Khaid was elected a fellow of the World Health Organization, a fellow of the African Academy of Sciences (FAAS) in 2014, and a fellow of The Word Academy of Sciences (FTWAS) in 2018.

== Selected publications ==
- Thomas Jürgen Schmidt, Sami A Khalid, AJ Romanha, Tânia Maria de Almeida Alves, Maique Weber Biavatti, Reto Brun, FB Da Costa, Solange Lisboa de Castro, Vitor Francisco Ferreira, MVG De Lacerda, JH Lago, LL Leon, Norberto Peporine Lopes, RC das Neves Amorim, Michael Niehues, Ifedayo Victor Ogungbe, Adrian Martin Pohlit, Marcus Tullius Scotti, William N Setzer, Soeiro M de NC, Mário Steindel, Andre Gustavo Tempone (2012). The potential of secondary metabolites from plants as drugs or leads against protozoan neglected diseases-part II, Curr. Med. Chem, 19:14 2128–2175.
- Sami A Khalid, Helmut Duddeck, Manuel Gonzalez-Sierra (1989/9). Isolation and characterization of an antimalarial agent of the neem tree Azadirachta indica. Journal of Natural Products, 52:5 922–927.
- Sami A Khalid, Asim Farouk, Timothy G Geary, James B Jensen (1986/2/1). Potential antimalarial candidates from African plants: an in vitro approach using Plasmodium falciparum. Journal of Ethnopharmacology, 15:2 201–209.
- Ahmed El Tahir, Gwiria MH Satti, Sami A Khalid (1999/3/1). Antiplasmodial activity of selected Sudanese medicinal plants with emphasis on Maytenus senegalensis (Lam.) Exell. Journal of Ethnopharmacology, 64:3 227–233.
- Ahmed El‐Tahir, Gwiria MH Satti, Sami A Khalid (1999/9). Antiplasmodial activity of selected Sudanese medicinal plants with emphasis onAcacia nilotica. Phytotherapy Research: An International Journal Devoted to Pharmacological and Toxicological Evaluation of Natural Product Derivatives, 13:6 474–478.
