= Donald Mackay Medal =

Award for outstanding work in tropical health

The Donald Mackay Medal is awarded for outstanding work in tropical health, especially relating to improvements in the health of rural or urban workers in the tropics. It is named after Donald Mackay, who was deputy Director of the Ross Institute at the London School of Hygiene and Tropical Medicine.

== History ==
The medal is awarded annually, by the Royal Society of Tropical Medicine and Hygiene in even-numbered years by the American Society of Tropical Medicine and Hygiene in odd-numbered years. It was first awarded in 1990.

== Criteria ==
The award criteria are determined by the :

- Trustees of the Mackay Memorial Fund
- Councils of the Royal Society of Tropical Medicine and Hygiene
- American Society of Tropical Medicine and Hygiene

=== Recipients ===
Medal recipients are:

- 1990: Ralph H. Henderson
- 1991: Brian Greenwood
- 1992: Bernard Kouchner
- 1993: Warren and Gretchen Berggren
- 1994: Jill Seaman
- 1995: Alfred A. Buck
- 1996: Ahmed M. El Hassan
- 1997: Hernando Groot
- 1998: Eldryd H. O. Parry
- 1999: Franklin A. Neva
- 2000: James L. Tulloch
- 2001: Joseph A. Cook
- 2003: Eric Ottesen
- 2004: Alan Fenwick
- 2005: David L. Heymann
- 2006: Paul M. Fine
- 2007: David H. Molyneux
- 2008: Anthony Bryceson
- 2009: Jane Cardosa
- 2010: Tran Tinh Hien
- 2011: David Sack & Bradley Sack, Johns Hopkins Bloomberg School of Public Health
- 2012: Tewolde Gebremeskel
- 2013: Myron M. Levine, University of Maryland School of Medicine & Gary J. Weil, Washington University School of Medicine
- 2014: Alimuddin Zumla
- 2015: Dennis Shanks, University of Queensland Mayne Medical School and the Australian Army Malaria Institute (AMI).
- 2016 Moses Bockarie
- 2017 Patrick Lammie
- 2018 Ahmed Hassan Fahal, University of Khartoum and Mycetoma Research Center.
- 2019 Christopher King, Case Western Reserve University
- 2020 Eleni Aklillu, Karolinska Institute
- 2021 Philip Thuma, Macha Research Trust

== See also ==
- List of medicine awards
