= Ahmed Hassan Fahal =

Sudanese surgeon (born 1956)

Professor Ahmed Hassan Fahal OMRI OPA FAAS FTWAS FRCS FRCP FRCSI
- أحمد حسن فحل
- Born: 25 December 1956 (age 69); Khartoum, Sudan
- Education: University of Khartoum
- Awards: Az-Zubair Prize for Innovation and Scientific Excellence; Donald Mackay Medal; RSTMHH
- Scientific career
- Fields: Surgery; Mycetoma; Medical Education
- Workplaces: University of Khartoum; Mycetoma Research Center
- Website: https://www.ahmedfahal.net/

Ahmed Hassan Fahal (Arabic: أحمد حسن فحل, born 25 December 1956) is a Sudanese Professor of Surgery at the University of Khartoum, who specialised in Mycetoma.

== Life and career ==
=== Early life and education ===
Fahal was born on 25 December 1956 in Khartoum, Sudan. He obtained an MBBS degree with distinction from the University of Khartoum in 1979, a Master of Surgery (MS) in 1984, before becoming a Doctor of Medicine (MD) in 1996.

=== Career ===
Fahal joined the Department of Surgery, Faculty of Medicine, University of Khartoum, in 1981 as a teaching assistant, becoming an assistant professor (lecturer) in 1984, an associate professor (senior lecturer) in 1990, and a professor of surgery in 1997. During the same time, he started practising at Soba Hospital, University of Khartoum, in 1979 as a House Officer, becoming a Senior House Officer in 1980, a Registrar in 1981, and Senior Surgical Registrar by 1984. He travelled to the UK and worked as Rotating Registrar at the University College Hospital and Middlesex Hospital from 1984 to 1986. He returned to Sudan as a Consultant Surgeon at Soba Hospital, University of Khartoum.

=== Personal life ===
Fahal is married with four children.

== Research ==
Fahal's research focuses on mycetoma and tropical surgery. He has authored numerous peer-reviewed publications, books, and presentations, and has participated in national and international collaborations. He founded and currently directs the Mycetoma Research Centre (MRC) at the University of Khartoum and the Mycetoma Control Programme in Sudan.

Fahal had many roles as an educator, whether domestically or internationally. As of November 2022, Fahal is the President of the Scientific Research and Innovation Agency, Sudan, an advisor for the Minister of Higher Education and Scientific research, Sudan, a member of the executive council of the Sudanese National Academy of Sciences (SNAS) since 2007, founding secretary general for the Sudanese Association of Medical Education (2004), founding member of the Global Academy of Tropical Surgery (2004) and the African Association for Health Professions Education and Research (2007), World Health Organization Consultant for Medical Education, and an Editor for the PLoS Neglected Tropical Diseases Journal.

== Awards and honours ==
As of November 2022, Fahal is a top 2% academic and the best Sudanese researcher. He is the top researcher worldwide on Mycetoma. Domestically, Fahal was awarded Az-Zubair Prize for Innovation and Scientific Excellence in 2000. The University of Khartoum awarded Fahal the excellence in scientific research award in 2010, the excellence in administrative achievements award in 2016, and the long-standing excellence in scientific research award in 2019.

Fahal was elected as a Fellow of the Royal Society of Tropical Medicine and Hygiene in 1992, a Fellow of the Royal College of Physicians (FRCP), a Fellow of both the Royal Colleges of Surgeons, Ireland (FRCSI) and UK (FRCS), a Fellow of the African Academy of Sciences (FAAS) in 2014, and a Fellow of The Word Academy of Sciences (FTWAS) in 2019.

Fahal was also awarded the Ordre des Palmes académiques (OPA), the Republic of France in 2018, the Order of Merit of the Italian Republic (OMRI) in 2018, and the Donald Mackay Medal from the Royal Society of Tropical Medicine and Hygiene in 2018.

== Selected publications ==
- A.H. Fahal (2004). Mycetoma: a thorn in the flesh. Transactions of the Royal Society of Tropical Medicine and Hygiene, Volume 98, Issue 1, January 2004, Pages 3–11, doi:10.1016/S0035-9203(03)00009-9.
- Queiroz-Telles, Flavio; Fahal, Ahmed Hassan; Falci, Diego R.; Caceres, Diego H.; Chiller, Tom; Pasqualotto, Alessandro C. (2017-11-01). Neglected endemic mycoses. The Lancet Infectious Diseases. 17 (11): e367–e377. doi:10.1016/S1473-3099(17)30306-7. ISSN 1473-3099. PMID 28774696.
- Ahmed, Abdalla OA; Leeuwen, Willem van; Fahal, Ahmed; Sande, Wendy van de; Verbrugh, Henri; Belkum, Alex van (2004-09-01). Mycetoma caused by Madurella mycetomatis: a neglected infectious burden. The Lancet Infectious Diseases. 4 (9): 566–574. doi:10.1016/S1473-3099(04)01131-4. ISSN 1473-3099. PMID 15336224.
- Ahmed, Abdalla OA; Leeuwen, Willem van; Fahal, Ahmed; Sande, Wendy van de; Verbrugh, Henri; Belkum, Alex van (2004-09-01). Mycetoma caused by Madurella mycetomatis: a neglected infectious burden. The Lancet Infectious Diseases. 4 (9): 566–574. doi:10.1016/S1473-3099(04)01131-4. ISSN 1473-3099. PMID 15336224.
- Zijlstra, Eduard E.; Sande, Wendy W. J. van de; Welsh, Oliverio; Mahgoub, El Sheikh; Goodfellow, Michael; Fahal, Ahmed H. (2016-01-01). Mycetoma: a unique neglected tropical disease. The Lancet Infectious Diseases. 16 (1): 100–112. doi:10.1016/S1473-3099(15)00359-X. ISSN 1473-3099. PMID 26738840.

== See also ==
- Sami Ahmed Khalid
- Abdin Mohamed Ali Salih
