= List of The State of Kuwait Prize for the Control of Cancer, Cardiovascular Diseases and Diabetes in the Eastern Mediterranean Region recipients =

This is a list of recipients of The State of Kuwait Prize for the Control of Cancer, Cardiovascular Diseases and Diabetes in the Eastern Mediterranean Region awarded by World Health Organization (WHO).

The foundation was formed in 2003 by the State of Kuwait and awarded an individual who has made an exceptional contribution to the prevention, control, or study of diabetes, cardiovascular disease, or cancer. The prize, which consists of a bronze medal and an amount of money estimated to be worth $5,000 USD, can be awarded to one or more people once a year.

== List of recipients ==
Year	Name	Country
2006	Samir Alam	Lebanon
2007	Kamel Ajlouni	Jordan
2009	Naeem A. Jaffarey	PAK
2009	Mahmoud Sarhan	Jordan
2010	Bagher Larijani	Iran
2010	Ali Jaffar Mohamed	Oman
2011	Alireza A. Moghaddam	Iran
2012	Mohamed Mohsen Ibrahim	Egypt
2014	Khaled Ahmed Al Saleh	Kuwait
2016	Nizal Sarradzadegan	Iran
2018	Mohamed Ibrahim Khamseh	Iran
2019	Abla Mehio Sibai	Lebanon
2019	Alireza Esteghamati	Iran
2019	Samar Alhomoud	Saudi Arabia
2020	Sulafa Khalid Mohamed Ali	Sudan
2022	Afshin Ostovar	Iran
2023	Davood Khalili	Iran
2024	Majid Ghayour-Mobarhan	Iran
2024	Noor Badar Al Busaidi	Oman
