= Haga Kashif Badri =

Sudanese activist

- Born: Omdurman
- Citizenship: Sudan
- Education: University of Kharthoum
- Occupation: Educationist

Haga Kashif Badri is a Sudanese women's rights activist, one of the pioneer women in Sudanese education.

== Education ==
Born in Omdurman, Badri completed her primary, intermediate and secondary education in Omdurman. She attained her Bachelor of Arts from Khartoum University College (1956) and her M.Sc. in history from Cairo University (1977).

== Work ==
From 1956 to 1958, Badri was assistant information officer in the Ministry of Culture and Information. She left the role for political reasons.

From 1960 to 1963 she taught at the Al - Mahdi Secondary School for Girls, before teaching at a high school in Ethiopia for five years.

SHe was president of the Social Welfare Council with the rank of minister (1980). She issued a booklet (Khalil Alshaer) 1954. Feminist movement in Sudan (Book) University of Khartoum Publishing 2002. The Cultural Caravan magazine was published in 1956.

== Publication and books ==
Badri has written educational articles in the educational documentation magazine, and articles on women's issues in Al-Sarha newspaper. She was a reporter for the Italian newspaper Al Rai in Italy for four years.
