= Tahani Abdalla Attia Gasmalla =

Sudanese politician

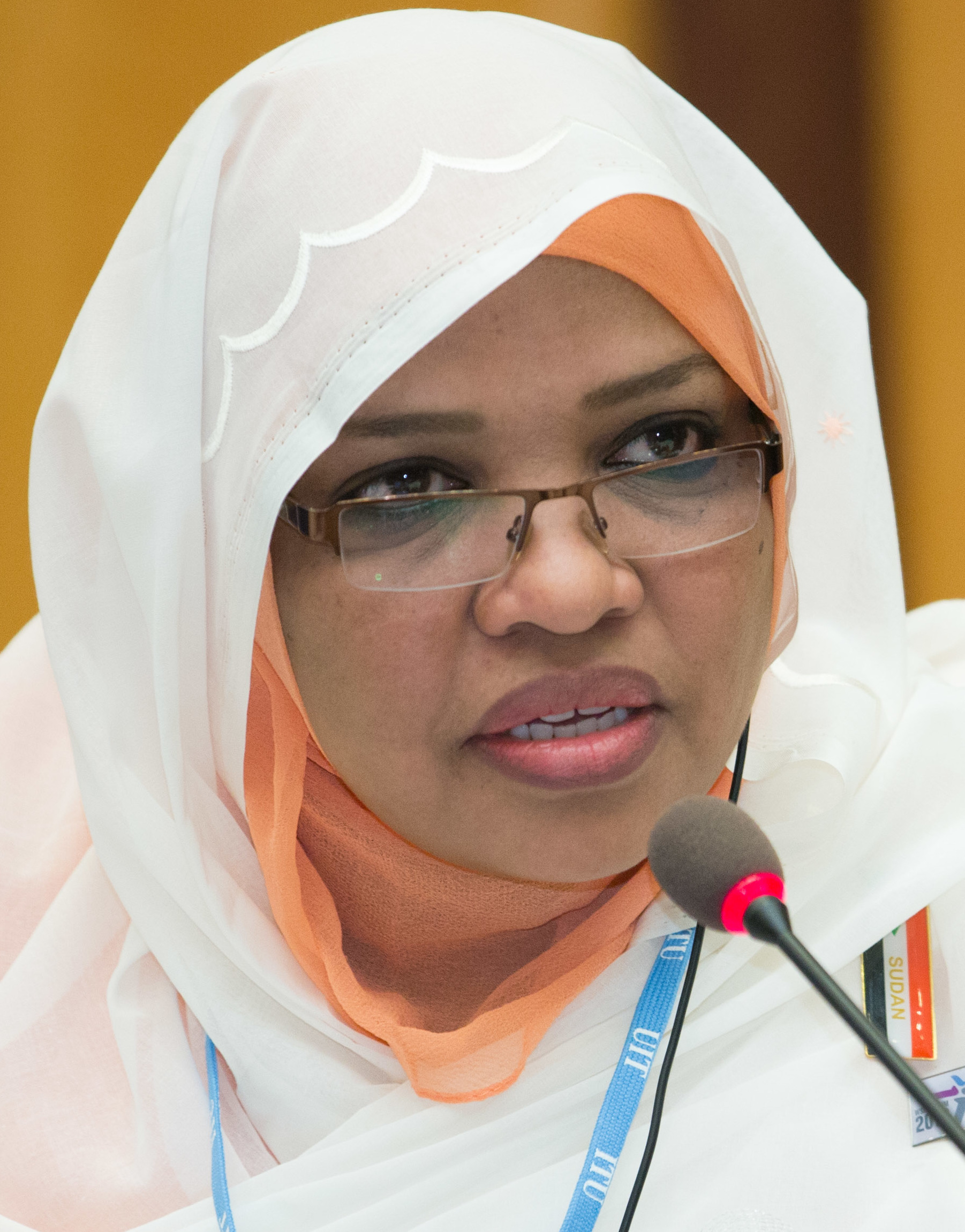
- Tahani Abdalla Attia Gasmalla
- Born: 21 November 1969 (age 56); Elmaknia, Nile River State, Sudan
- Other names: Tahani AbdallahAttia Gasmalla; Tahani Abdalla Attia

Tahani Abdalla Attia Gasmalla is the Minister of Science and Communication of Sudan and an associate professor in the faculty of engineering at the University of Khartoum.

== Education ==
Gasmalla obtained her bachelor degree from the University of Khartoum in 1993, in 1999she obtained Master degree in the same school and obtained her PhD in 2006.

== Career and memberships ==
After becoming a member of IEE London in 2008, she became the acting HOD of Electrical and Electronics engineering at the International University of Africa in 2009. In 2010, she became a specialist engineer at the Sudanese Engineering Council and in 2012 she became a Member of the Executive Office of the Engineering Society. Between 2012 and 13, she was a Minister of State at the Ministry of Science and Communications, she was a Minister of Science and Communications for two years starting from 2013. In 2015, she was appointed as the Minister of Communications and Information Technology.
