= Az-Zubair Prize for Innovation and Scientific Excellence =

- Native name: جائزة الزبير للإبداع والتميز العلمي
- Awarded for: Scientific innovation and creativity in applied and technological fields
- Sponsored by: President of Sudan
- Date: Annually
- Country: Sudan

Az-Zubair Prize for Innovation and Scientific Excellence (Arabic: جائزة الزبير للإبداع والتميز العلمي) is an annual Sudanese scientific prize awarded by the President of Sudan for scientific innovation and creativity in applied and technological fields.

== History ==
On November 7, 1998, President Omer Al-Bashir passed a bill to establish an annual scientific award for innovation and scientific excellence that commemorate General Az-Zubair Mohammed Salih, former Sudan's vice president who died in an aeroplane crash. The award is governed by the Association for the Promotion of Scientific Innovation (APSI), a specialized organization that was established by General Az-Zubair for sponsoring technological advances and scientific research.

== Prize types ==
The prize is divided onto two major levels:

- Special Honorary Prize - awarded for individuals who had great distinctive works and great scientific position that majorly contributed to the society.
- Competitors level is divided onto three sub-categories:
  - Scientific level - open to higher certificate holders and researchers
  - Youth level - open to students and graduates of universities and higher institutions
  - Talented level - open to anyone that presents valuable and empirical invention or creative work that reflects talent and excellence and has a great value for the society

== Prize fields ==
The general fields of the Az-Zubair Prize are:

- Islamic Studies
- Medical and Health Sciences
- Engineering and Mathematical Sciences
- Computer Science and Information Technology
- Agriculture
- Veterinary and Animal production.
- Economics and Administrative Sciences
- Natural Sciences
- Liberal Arts
- Behavioural sciences

== Award ==
The prize award is composed of:

- A medallion of science, awarded by the President of Sudan
- Scientific patent bearing the name of the winner and abstract for winning
- Monetary award of SDD20 million Sudanese dinar (equivalent to $90,000) distributed among the winners

=== Recipients ===
- 2000 Awn Alsharif Qasim
- 2000 Ahmed Hassan Fahal
- 2003 El Hadi Ahmed El Sheikh
