= Sharief Babiker =

Sudanese electronics engineer

- ﺷﺮﻳﻒ ﺑﺎﺑﻜﺮ
- Education: University of Khartoum
- Occupation: Academician
- Organization: IEE
- Title: Professor

Sharief Babiker (Arabic: ﺷﺮﻳﻒ ﺑﺎﺑﻜﺮ) is a Sudanese Professor of Electrical Engineering at the University of Tennessee at Chattanooga. He serves as the chairman of the IEEE Sudan subsection.

== Education ==
Sharief Fadoul Babiker graduated high school in 1979, coming fourth national wide. He then completed his undergraduate studies in electrical and electronic engineering at the University of Khartoum in 1984. He earned a master's degree in telecommunications and information systems from Essex University in the United Kingdom in 1987. He received his PhD in nanoelectronics attained from the University of Glasgow in Scotland.

== Career ==
In the year 2000, Babiker was appointed and engaged in research on submicron semiconductor devices at the Nanoelectronics Research Centre, University of Glasgow. He also contributed to aerospace projects at Thales Avionics in the United Kingdom.
