= Ammar Mohammed Mahmoud =

Sudanese diplomat

Ammar Mohammed Mahmoud is a Sudanese diplomat, currently serving as Chargé d'Affaires and Acting Permanent Representative of Sudan to the United Nations. Previously, he was Sudan’s Deputy Permanent Representative to the United Nations Environment Programme and United Nations Human Settlements Programme (UN-Habitat) in Nairobi, Kenya. From February 2013 to May 2014 he was the First Secretary of the Embassy of Sudan in Abuja, Nigeria, in charge of the Consular, Press and Cultural Affairs. Prior to that he served as Vice Consul in Sudan’s Consulate-General in Jeddah, Saudi Arabia, from 2007 to 2011.

== Early life and education ==
Ammar was schooled in Geneina, Western Darfur, where he showed early promise. He was student body president of Ardamata high school in 1995. He then graduated from the University of Khartoum in 2002 with a B.Sc. in Political Science and a Postgraduate Diploma in International Relations in 2007. He obtained a Master of Laws Degree (LL.M) in International Crime and Justice from the University of Turin in Italy in 2012. He also attended the United Nations African Regional Fellowship in International Law in 2014. He also attended the Netherlands Institute of International Relations Clingendael in The Hague.

== Publications ==
The International Criminal Court, the Security Council and Darfur: A Critique: Hamburg: Anchor Academic Publishing, 2017

An op-ed contributor in some National Daily Newspapers in Sudan.
