= Nisreen Elsaim =

Sudanese youth climate activist

- نسرين الصائم
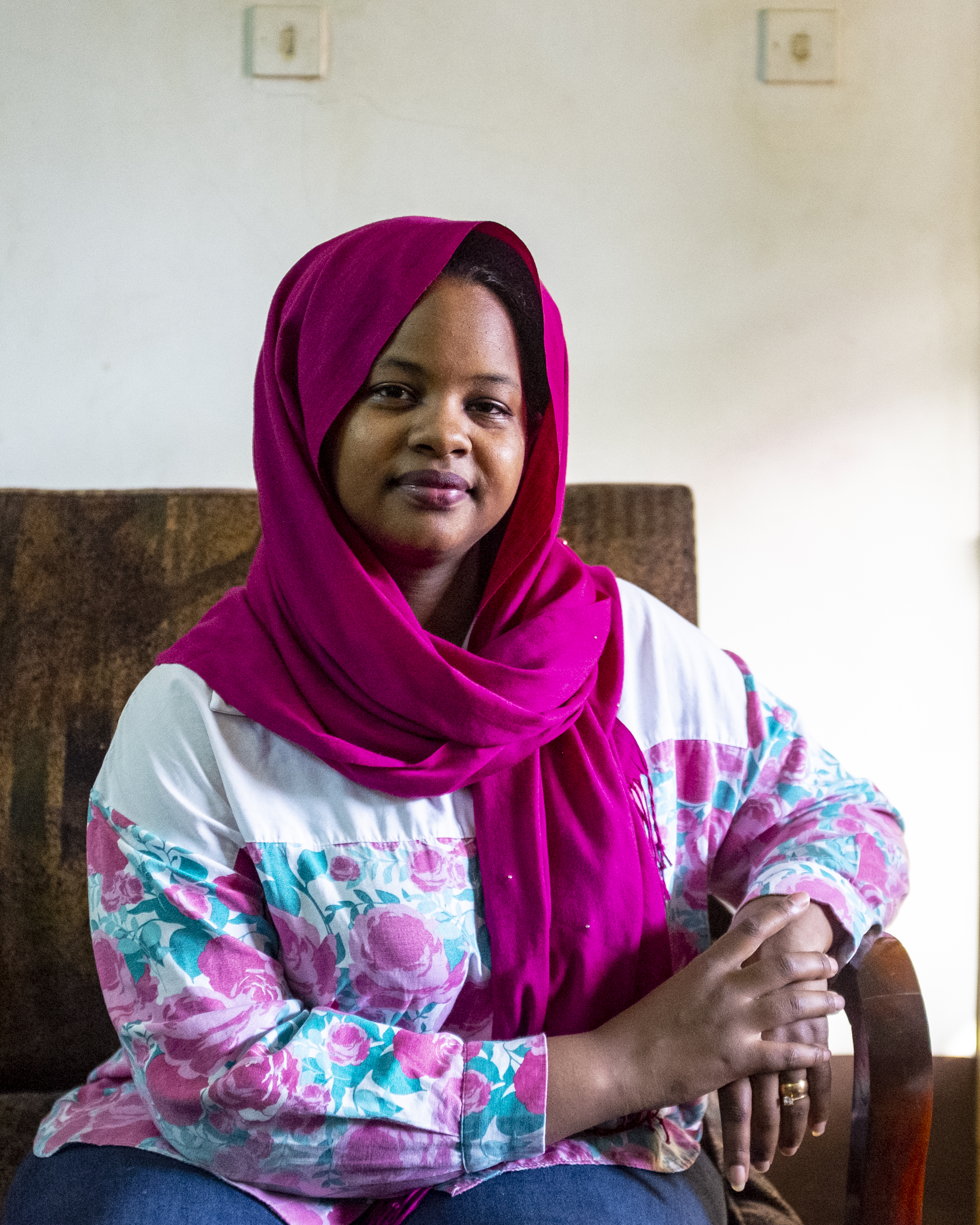
- Nisreen Elsaim in 2022
- Born: Sudan
- Education: University of Khartoum, Sudan
- Occupation: Climate activist
- Years active: 2012-present
- Movement: Sudan Youth for Climate Change

Nisreen Elsaim (Arabic: نسرين الصائم) is a Sudanese climate activist and climate negotiator.

== Early life and education ==
Elsaim was born in Sudan and was raised in Khartoum. As a child, Elsaim interacted with nature frequently, often playing on the riverbanks of the White Nile and the Blue Nile, which meet in Khartoum.

Elsaim holds a bachelor's degree in physics and a master's degree in renewable energy technology from the University of Khartoum.

== Career ==
In 2012, due to protests during her first year at the University of Khartoum, the government shut down the school for three and a half months. During this time away from classes, Elsaim became interested in science diplomacy and began volunteering at the Sudanese Environment Conservation Society.

In 2016, she founded the Sudan Youth Organisation for Climate Change (SYOCC). She remained its Chair until 2021.

By 2018, Elsaim was involved with the Pan African Climate Justice Alliance, and was working as a junior negotiator with the African Group of Negotiators on Climate Change (AGN).

In 2019, she attended the Abu Dhabi Youth Voices conference. After the conference, she was invited to co-organize the 2019 United Nations Youth Climate Summit.

Elsaim was the chair of the United Nations' first Youth Advisory Group on Climate Change from 2020 to 2022, organized by the UN Secretary-General António Guterres, after a nomination by the Pan African Climate Justice Alliance. Speaking on the experience in 2023, she noted that although she felt the advisory group "changed the culture around youth engagement," she also found it frustrating "to follow UN protocols rather than work as independent activists".

== Recognition and awards ==
Elsaim was awarded a fellowship at the Robert Bosch Academy in Germany until November 2024.

In 2022, Elsaim was selected as a laureate of the Marianne Initiative for Human Rights Defenders, a programme launched by French President Emmanuel Macron to support human rights defenders from around the world.

- Young Activists Summit
- June 2024 Kofi Annan NextGen Democracy Prize finalist; organized by the Kofi Annan Foundation and the Democracy and Culture Foundation.

== Personal life ==
Elsaim participated in the Sudanese revolution in 2018 and 2019.

A month after the Sudanese civil war began in April 2023, Elsaim and her family, including her husband and nine-month-old son, had to flee Sudan for their safety. Her brother-in-law, who stayed behind, died shortly after. She has since returned to the country briefly, but not to Khartoum.

Since the onset of the Sudanese civil war, she has lived in London, Paris, Florence, and Berlin.

== See also ==
- Climate change in Sudan
