= Mustafa Abdalla Mohamed Salih =

Prof Mustafa Abdalla Mohamed Salih
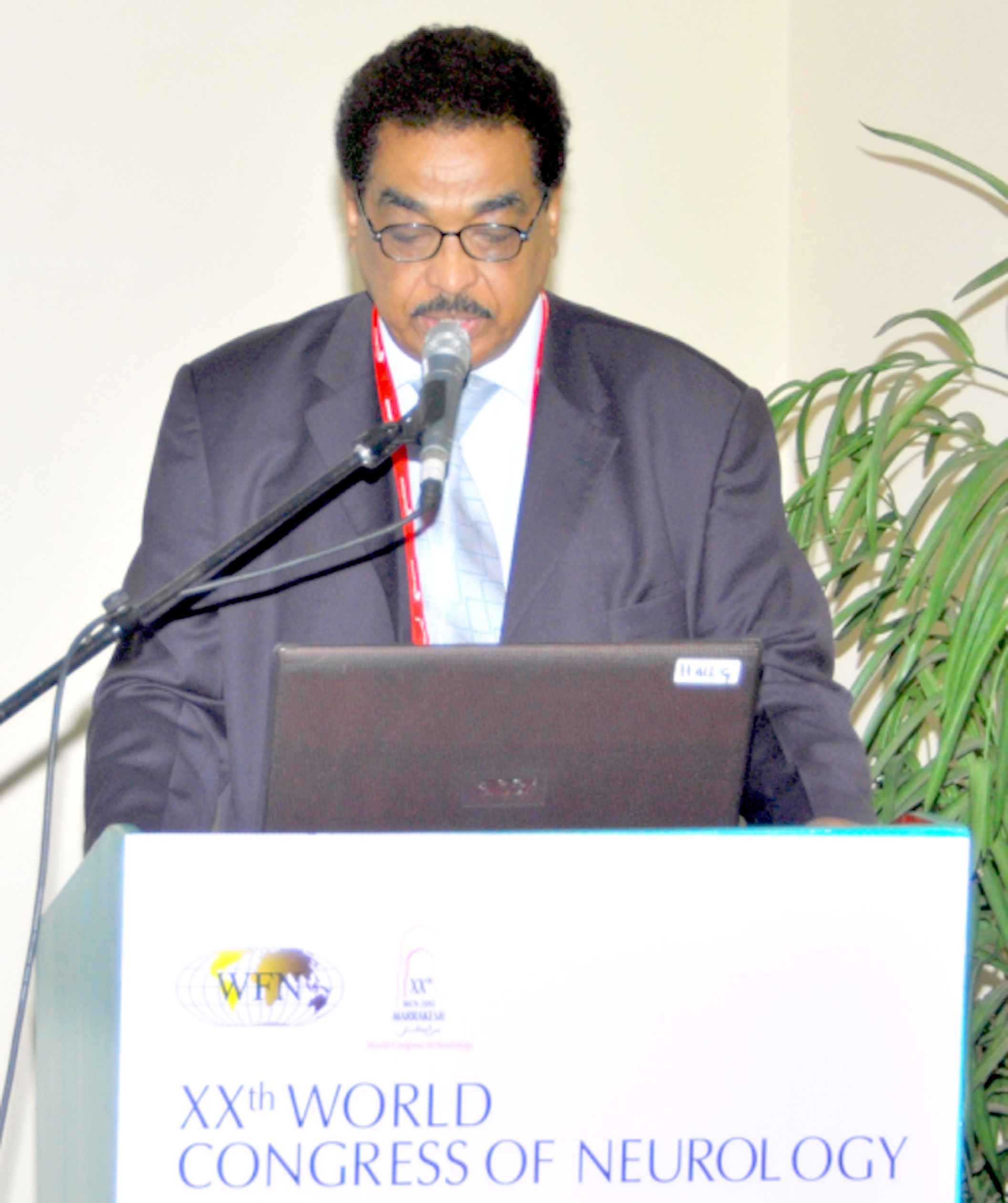
- Mustafa Abdalla Mohamed Salih - 20th World Congress of Neurology, Morocco
- Born: Mustafa Abdalla; 1950-01-05; Kosti, Sudan
- Education: MBBS, Faculty of Medicine, University of Khartoum, 1974. MPCH, Faculty of Medicine, University of Khartoum, 1980. MD, Faculty of Medicine, University of Khartoum, 1982. Dr Med Sci, Uppsala University, 1990
- Occupation: Pediatric neurologist
- Known for: Established first pediatric neurology specialty in Sudan; One of founders of pediatric neurology specialty in Saudi Arabia; Identified inherited neurologic diseases which bear his name

Mustafa Abdalla Mohamed Salih (Arabic: مصطفى عبد الله محمد صالح), (born January 5, 1950), is a Sudanese academic professor, scientist and pediatric neurologist. He established the first pediatric neurology specialty in Sudan and is also one of the founders of the pediatric neurology specialty in Saudi Arabia. He identified inherited neurologic diseases which were subsequently named after him. Salih Myopathy, Salih ataxia, and Bosley-Salih-Alorainy syndrome resulting from mutations in HOXA1 gene. He is also known to have led a team of scientists who proved that the extract from broad beans also known as hoarse beans had the ability to cure epilepsy spasms. Mustafa is also credited for having discovered a novel form of hereditary spastic paraplegia.

== Education and career ==
Professor Mustafa Salih holds an MBBS degree (1974), an MD in Clinical Pediatrics (1980), a Doctor of Medicine with Distinction (1982) from the University of Khartoum. He also holds a Doctor of Medical Science from Uppsala University in Sweden (1990). He was elected Fellow of the Royal College of Paediatrics and Child Health (FRCPCH, UK, 2005). He is also a Fellow of the American Academy of Neurology (FAAN, USA, 2015).

=== Medical career ===
==== Institutions ====
- Faculty of Medicine, University of Khartoum, Sudan
- King Saud University College of Medicine College of Medicine, King Saud University, Riyadh, Saudi Arabia
- AlMughtaribeen University Faculty of Medicine, Khartoum, Sudan

=== Early life and education ===
Mustafa Salih was born in Kosti, Sudan on 5 January 1950. He attended secondary school in Kosti and entered the University of Khartoum in 1968. After completing his MBBS at the Faculty of Medicine, University of Khartoum in 1974, he joined the Department of Pediatrics and Child Health as a Teaching Assistant and attained an MD in Clinical Pediatrics (previously named MPCH) in1980.

He specialized in the field of pediatric neurology, which at the time was not being practiced in Sudan upon spending 15 months at the Regional Neurological Centre, Newcastle upon Tyne, UK. This was a part of a linkage program between the University of Newcastle upon Tyne and the University of Khartoum, Sudan. The objectives were to provide training in pediatric neurology with Dr David Gardner-Medwin and neuromuscular disorders with Lord Walton. The other objective was to develop an MD thesis on severe childhood autosomal recessive muscular dystrophy at the University of Khartoum.

On returning from UK, he established the first pediatric neurology service in Sudan, and also earned a Doctor of Medicine with Distinction degree (1982) from the University of Khartoum. In a joint linkage program with Uppsala University in Sweden, he developed a research project on the 1985-1990 pandemic of meningococcal meningitis, leading to a Doctor of Medical Science degree from Uppsala University (1990).

=== Career ===
Professor Mustafa Salih served as Lecturer, Associate Professor and Professor of Pediatrics, and was Head of the Department of Pediatrics and Child Health, Faculty of Medicine, U of K (1990-1992). Since 1992, Prof. Salih served as Professor of Pediatrics and Consultant Pediatric Neurologist at the College of Medicine, King Saud University, Riyadh, Saudi Arabia, and founded the Division of Pediatric Neurology.

=== Research interests ===
He has authored more than 250 peer-reviewed articles and 30 book chapters on pediatric neurology, neurogenetics, neurodegenerative diseases and neuromuscular disorders. The articles have been published on journals such as Science, Nature Genetics, Brain, Annals of Neurology, Neurology, American Journal of Human Genetics and Genome Biology. He also edited a book on Clinical Child Neurology which was published by Springer International Publishing in 2020. Google Scholar lists thousands of citations of papers authored by Professor Mustafa Salih.

Several of Mustafa's research projects involved managing outbreaks of infectious diseases including measles, and an early example of molecular epidemiology which tracked the progress of a strain of neisseria meningitidis during a pandemic of mengingococcal sepsis across parts of Asia and Africa in the late 1980s. He holds two United States patents; one on a diagnostic method for congenital muscular dystrophy, and the other on an anticonvulsant extracted from broad beans (vicia faba). He has also evaluated new techniques for the rapid diagnosis of bacterial meningitis.

== Books ==
- Salih, Mustafa (2019-07-07). Clinical Child Neurology. Springer. ISBN 9783319431529.
