= Eleni Aklillu =

Senior scientific researcher, professor of tropical pharmacology

- Education: Addis Ababa University (Bachelor of Pharmacy); Addis Ababa University (M.S.); Karolinska Institute (Ph.D)
- Known for: Tropical pharmacology research

Eleni Aklillu is an Ethiopian senior research scientist and research group leader at the Karolinska Institute. She is also a professor of tropical pharmacology at the same institute. She is a Fellow of The Royal College of Physicians Edinburgh (FRCPEdin), and a Fellow of the African Academy of Sciences and the laureate of the Donald Mackay Medal.

== Biography ==
=== Education ===
In 1987, Aklillu received a Bachelor of Pharmacy from Addis Ababa University in Ethiopia. She earned a Master of Science in Biochemistry from the same university in 1996. She went on to obtain a Doctorate of Philosophy degree in Molecular genetics from the Karolinska Institute in Stockholm, Sweden, in 2003.

=== Career ===
In 2009, she became an associate professor of pharmacology at the Karolinska Institute. Since 2020, she has been a full professor of tropical pharmacology specializing in the area of pharmacogenomics at the same institute. Aklillu is also a senior researcher and research group leader at the Department of Global Public Health within the Karolinska Institute.

=== Research ===
Aklillu's main area of research is clinical pharmacology and pharmacognetics with focus on major infectious diseases that are classified as public health problems, the largest global burden, and the leading cause of death/disability, particularly in low and middle-income countries. Her areas of research include: optimization of treatments and prevention of HIV/AIDS, Tuberculosis, Malaria, and Neglected tropical diseases such as schistosomiasis, lymphatic filariasis, and Soil transmitted helminths that required Mass drug administration for the control and prevention of theses diseases. Her research group has conducted several prospective observational studies, randomized clinical trials, drug interaction and dose optimization studies in various countries of sub Saharan Africa.

== Distinctions ==
- African Academy of Sciences - Fellow
- European and Developing Countries Clinical Trials Partnership, Strategic Advisory Committee - Former Vice-Chair
- Royal College of Physicians of Edinburgh - Fellow
- Swedish Research Council, Advisory Committee - Board Member

== Awards ==
- 2020 Donald Mackay Medal - "for outstanding work in tropical health."

== Publications ==
She has over 170 publications. Her most cited work has been cited over 800 times.
