= Sudanese Encyclopedia of Tribes and Genealogies =

Non-fiction work on Sudanese culture

Sudanese Encyclopedia of Tribes and Genealogies (Arabic: موسوعة القبائل والأنساب في السودان; transliterated: Mawsu'at al-qaba`il wa'l-ansab fi 'l-Sudan) by Awn Alsharif Qasim, printed in Khartoum by Maktabat Afiruqraf (Afro-Graph) in 1996.

This encyclopaedia consists of seven volumes and 2628 pages. In his 12-page introduction, which is incorporated in the first volume, Qasim states his purpose and objectives of compiling such a work. He also mentions the scope or coverage, the criterion of inclusion, arrangement of the various entries and hints on how to use his encyclopaedia.

== Background ==
Qasim's encyclopaedia had its origins in the mid-1980s when he was collecting material for two of his other contributions, Halfayat al-Muluk, which is a regional biographical dictionary of the Halfaya region north of Khartoum, and Qamus al-lahja al-'ammiya fil-Sudan, 'A Dictionary of Sudanese Arabic'. Among those who appreciated the value of this indispensable source for Sudanese studies was R.S. O'Fahey, who followed its forms in writing Sudanese personal, tribal and place names.

Having revised and published these two works, Qasim began to plan for a project with a wider scope. His encyclopaedia appeared after more than ten years of active research and preparation.

There has been no shortage of studies on tribes, genealogies and noteworthy persons and place names in Sudan. Much research has been done during the past decades. The results, however, are scattered and often inaccessible. As Heather J. Sharkey points out, Richard Leslie Hill felt this problem a long time ago, when he said in the preface to the second edition of his Biographical dictionary of the Sudan, "Little books are born in the Sudan by the dozen, without imprints without date, even without title page. They circulate for a brief season and die without trace."

== Scope and coverage of the encyclopaedia ==
Qasim states in his introduction that his original intention was to follow the method used in his first encyclopaedia by including the major ethnic groups, important place names and noteworthy individuals deceased before the present day. The author, however, felt that bringing together such material and bringing them up to date would make his work more useful. Thus his encyclopaedia covers all of the Sudan and spans ancient and present times.

== Arrangement of the encyclopaedia ==
The author does not follow a thematic or subject classification or arrangement for the entries of the six volumes. He prefers to arrange his entries in Arabic alphabetical order, irrespective of their subject matter. Thus entries on tribes, noteworthy persons and important place names are arranged together. Cross-references are used to lead the reader from names that are familiar to alternate names that may not be. Internal cross-references also appear frequently within entries, where they are identified by the Arabic letter mīm to denote 'see' or 'see also'.
