= Awn Alsharif Qasim =

Sudanese scholar (1933 - 2006)

- عون الشريف قاسم
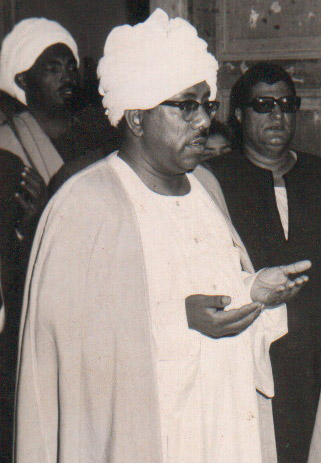
- Awn Alsharif Qasim

Minister of Religion Affairs (Sudan) 1971–1981

Personal details
- Born: June 16, 1933 Khartoum, Sudan
- Died: 19 January 2006 (aged 72)

Awn Al-Sharif Qasim (Arabic: عون الشريف قاسم) (June 16, 1933 – January 19, 2006) was a prolific Sudanese writer, encyclopedist, scholar, community leader, and one of Sudan's leading experts on Arabic language and literature.

He was a strong advocate of Arabic/Islamic culture and its interweaving with Sudanese culture. Qasim authored more than 70 books in the area of Islamic history and civilization, Arabic literature, studies in the Sudanese dialect languages.

Along with Professor Abdalla Eltayeb and Professor Abu Saleem, Qasim was considered one of the scholars who shaped the Sudanese academic scene during the last three decades of the 20th century.

== Early life and education ==
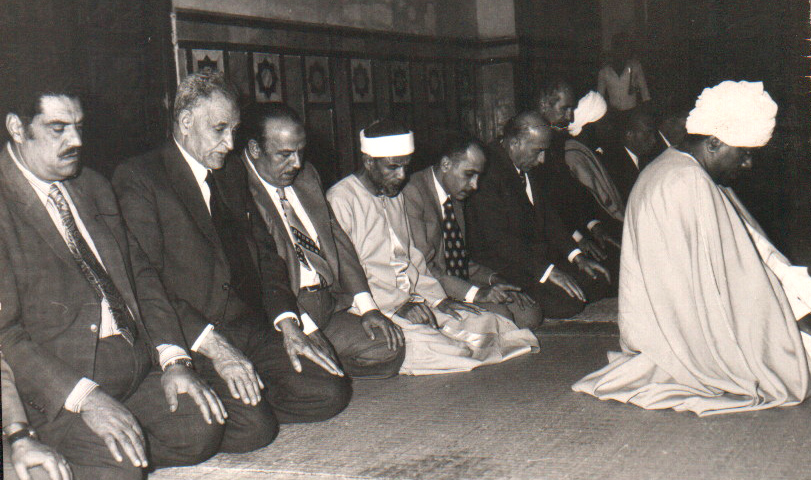
Qasim with Sheikh Alsharawi of Egypt 1978

Qasim was born in Sudan's ancient city Halfayat Almilook in 1933. His father immigrated to Sudan from Yemen in 1925 and settled in the city of Halfayat Almilook in Khartoum North and became a known religious figure in the area teaching and educating on Islamic sciences. Due to this background, Qasim was exposed to a heritage of Islamic and Arabic culture education since his early childhood that later on shaped his life.

He graduated from the College of Liberal Arts at the University of Khartoum in 1957. He earned his master's degree in 1960, majoring in Arabic and Islamic studies from the School of Oriental and African Studies, University of London. In 1967, he earned his PhD from the University of Edinburgh in Scotland.

== Career ==
Qasim served as a minister of religious affairs for 10 years (1971-1981) the longest period served by a minister in all Sudanese governments. During this period he demonstrated exceptional qualities as a leader and political religious figure and soon became one of the most popular and beloved ministers in Sudan's 1970s government for his strong work ethics, humbleness and honesty. He was able to connect with different religious groups and to promote ideas of peace and harmony among these groups. Qasim continued to write during this period and published dozens of books for the public. After the military coup by Omer Al Bashir, he was arrested along with other ministers from Nimeiri's government.

== Writings ==
In the mid-1990s, he authored the Sudanese Encyclopedia of Tribes and Genealogies, a pioneer, state of the art series of books for the different Sudanese tribes, their roots and origins. This project has entitled him to earn Az-Zubair Prize for Innovation and Scientific Excellence, the highest prestigious prize awarded by Sudanese government. He was also awarded the Egyptian prestigious First Class Golden Award for scientific achievements in 1992 by Egyptian President Muhammad Husni Mubarak.

Qasim also authored the Dictionary of the Sudanese dialect, another valuable source of information on Sudanese culture. His dictionary is used worldwide by scholars as a valuable reference on Sudanese dialects.

== Professions and affiliations ==
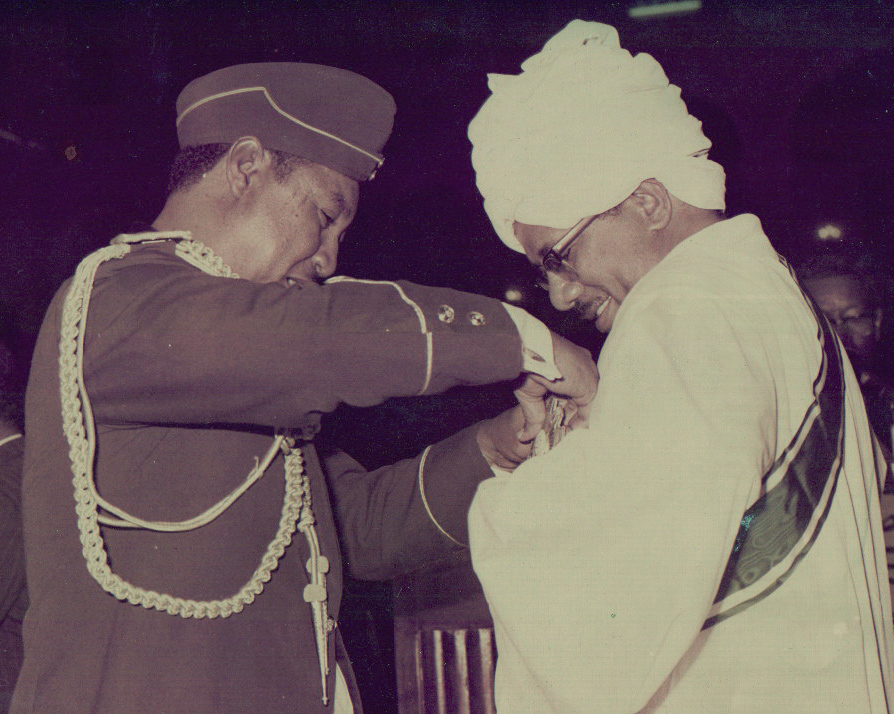
Qasim is honored by President Nimeri of Sudan 1978

- 1960 - 1961 University Lecturer, University of London UK
- 1961 - 1971 University Lecturer, University of Khartoum Sudan
- 1971 - 1981 Minister of Religious Affairs, Sudan
- 1975 Founded Institute of Islamic studies, Khartoum Sudan
- 1981 President Award for Scientific achievements
- 1982 - 1984 Professor, University of Khartoum, Sudan
- 1984 - 1995 Lecturer, Khartoum International Institute for Arabic Language, 1988 Head of Institute.
- 1990 - 1994 President, University of Khartoum, Sudan
- 1993 First Honor Golden Science Award for Excellence in Writing, Egypt awarded by President Mohammad Husni Mubarak.
- 1996 President, Omdurman Ahlia University, Sudan
- 2000 Az-Zubair Prize for Innovation and Scientific Excellence at the Scientist Level

== Special notes ==
- Prof. Qasim first intended to study medicine, however the Halfayat Almilook's bus was late that day, so he was late for the medical school physical exam. He then shifted his dreams and career to studies of Arabic language and literature.

== Books ==
- Qamus al-lahjah al-‘ammiyah fi al-Sudan (قاموس اللهجة العامية في السودان ) Dictionary of the local dialect in Sudan ISBN 977-353-010-8..
- Al-Din fi Hayatina (الدين في حياتنا) Religion in our life
- Fi ma‘rakat al-turath (في معركة التراث ) In War of Culture
- Mawsu‘at Al-qaba’il wa-al-ansab fi al-Sudan wa-ashhar asma’ al-a‘lam wa-al-amakin (موسوعة القبائل والأنساب في السودان وأشهر اسماء الاعلام والأماكن ) Sudanese Encyclopedia of Tribes and Genealogies
- Al-Risalah Al-khatimah (الرسالة الخاتمة ) The Final Message
- Diblumasiya Mohammed (دبلوماسية محمد ) Diplomacy of Mohammed
- Fi Tariq al Islam (في طريق الاسلام) In the Direction of Islam
- Shi'r al Basra fil 'asr al Ummawi: dirasah fil siyasah wal ijtima' (شعر البصرة في العصر الاموي: دراسة في السياسة والاجتماع) Poetry in Basra during the time of the Umayyads: A study in politics and society
