= Mycetoma Research Center =

Medical research facility in Khartoum, Sudan

- Abbreviation: MRC
- Formation: 1991
- Headquarters: University of Khartoum
- Location: Khartoum
- Region served: Sudan
- Director: Ahmed H. Fahal
- Website: mycetoma.edu.sd

The Mycetoma Research Center was established in 1991 under the umbrella of the University of Khartoum. It was set up at Soba University Hospital to provide medical care for mycetoma patients as well as conducting research and providing education.

== History ==
The center was established in 1991 as a subsidiary of the University of Khartoum. Its offices were destroyed during the ongoing Sudanese civil war, with the facility's director, Ahmed H. Fahal, stating that its biological banks, containing more than 40 years' worth of data, had been lost. Prior to its destruction, the facility received 12,000 patients annually and provided free treatment to 9,000 patients.
