= University of Science and Technology (Sudan) =

University in Omdurman, Sudan

- جامعة العلوم والتقانة
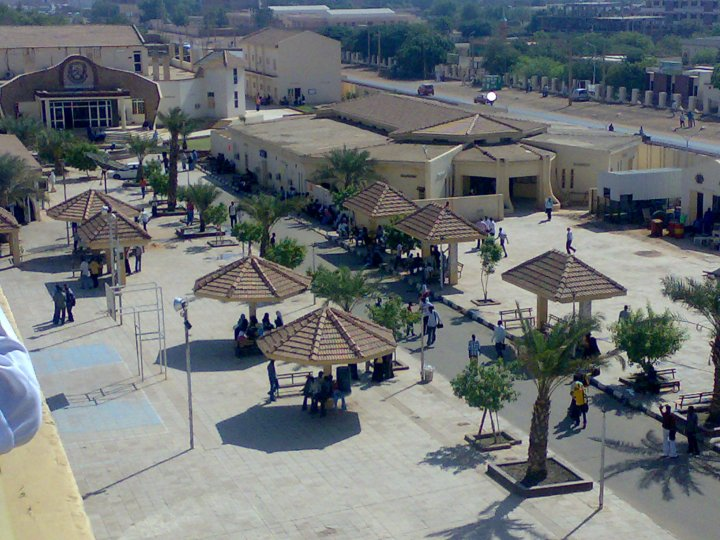
- Type: Private
- Established: March 1995; 30 years ago
- President: Elmutaz Elberier
- Students: 25,485
- Location: Omdurman, Sudan; 15.6719°N 32.4791°E
- Campuses: 4
- Affiliations: AARU
- Website: www.ust.edu.sd

The University of Science and Technology - Omdurman is a non-profit organization which was founded in March 1995. The founder and chairman of the university is Elmutaz Elberier.

== Foundation ==
The University of Science and Technology is located in Omdurman (Standard Arabic Umm Durmān أم درمان), the largest city in Sudan and Khartoum State. It aims to expand the base of computer and applied science; starting with the faculties of information technology, computer science and computer engineering which became known as the electrical and electronic engineering faculties; with four departments (communication, medical engineering, electronic and computer engineering and computer programming).

== Growth ==
Then the university opened new specialties such as Medical Laboratories Science and medicine were followed by it after ten years of two programs Dentistry and Pharmacy.

The year 2001 saw the start of the architecture program and then in 2002 came the business administration program. In 2005 another department was added to the engineering faculty which is a chemical engineering.

== Faculty ==
- Faculty of Medicine
- Faculty of Dentistry
- Faculty of Pharmacy
- Faculty of Medical Laboratory Science
- Faculty of Engineering
- Faculty of Computer Science and Information Technology
- Faculty of Administrative Sciences
- Faculty of Graduate Studies

== Centers ==
=== Research Centers ===
- Modern Agricultural Technology Center
- UST Center For AIDS Research
- UST Center For Malaria Research
- Diseased tissue and cell center
- Center for Population and Development Studies
- Center for Omdurman Studies

=== Administrative Centers ===
- Information Technology Center
- English Language Service Center
- E-Learning and Distance Learning Center
- Al-Barir Cultural Center

== See also ==
- Education in Sudan
