= Sulafa Khalid Mohamed Ali =

Sudanese paediatric cardiologist (born 1964)

Sulafa Khalid Mohamed Ali FRCPCH, FACC
- سلافة خالد محمد علي
- Born: 24 October 1964 (age 61); Khartoum, Sudan
- Occupation: Paediatric cardiologist
- Partner: Ahmed Musa Saeed
- Awards: Distinguished Young Researcher (1996); The State of Kuwait Prize for the Control of Cancer, Cardiovascular Diseases and Diabetes in the Eastern Mediterranean Region, WHO (2020); Advocacy Award, World Heart Federation (2022)

Academic background
- Education: Faculty of Medicine, University of Khartoum (MBBS, 1989)

Academic work
- Institutions: Faculty of Medicine, University of Khartoum; King Abdul-Aziz Cardiac Center

Sulafa Khalid Mohamed Ali (Arabic: سلافة خالد محمد علي; born 24 October 1964, in Khartoum) is a pioneer in paediatric cardiology in Sudan.

== Early life and education ==
Sulafa Khalid Mohamed Ali was born on 24 October 1964 in Khartoum, Sudan. Sulafa completed her high school at Khartoum North High School between 1980 and 1983. She earned a Bachelor of Medicine, Bachelor of Surgery from the Faculty of Medicine, University of Khartoum in 1989. In 1995, she was made a member of the Royal College of Paediatrics and Child Health and became a Fellow in 2006.

== Career ==
Sulafa started her medical training as a house officer at Khartoum Teaching Hospital (1990–1991), before becoming a resident paediatric (1991–1993). In 1993, she moved to Saudi Arabia to join the Security Forces Hospital, Riyadh, as a resident pediatric, before joining the Prince Salman Hospital, Riyadh, in 1997 as a pediatric specialist, and then the King Abdul-Aziz Cardiac Center in 1999 as an Assistant Consultant and Fellow Pediatric Cardiology.

Sulafa returned to Sudan to work at the Sudan Heart Center and Jafar Ibn Ouf Children’s Hospital as a Consultant Pediatric Cardiologist since July 2004 and an assistant professor at the Faculty of Medicine, University of Khartoum. She was promoted to an associate professor in July 2008 and later to a professor in July 2012 at the Department of Pediatrics and Child Health, University of Khartoum.

She has conducted valvular heart disease management efforts in numerous remote areas in Sudan with great success by raising money and utilising research funding. In 2012, She founded the Pediatric Cardiology Fellowship Program at the Sudan Medical Specialization Board. Along with the Federal Ministry of Health, she created a programme to control valvular heart disease in 2012. In addition to the WHO Expert Committee on Rheumatic Heart Disease, she is a member of several other national and international scientific groups.

She is the creator and chairwoman of Sudan's Rheumatic Heart Disease Control Program and the Sudanese Children's Heart Society, a nonprofit organisation supporting children with heart disease. She has also been the President of the Pan African Network of Pediatric and Congenital Heart Disease since 2022.

== Awards and honours ==
Sulafa was awarded the Faculty of Medicine, University of Khartoum Prize in Community Medicine in 1988 and Pediatrics in 1989. she also received the Prize of Distinguished Young Researcher from the Security Forces Hospital, Riyadh, in 1996. Sulafa was elected a Fellow of the Royal College of Paediatrics and Child Health in 2006, and a Fellow of the American College of Cardiology in 2007.

During the 67th meeting of the WHO Regional Committee for the Eastern Mediterranean Area in Cairo, Egypt, in October 2020, Sulafa received the State of Kuwait Prize for the Control of Cancer, Cardiovascular Diseases and Diabetes in the Eastern Mediterranean Region for her significant contribution in the field of cardiovascular diseases. Sulafa was awarded the World Heart Federation's Advocacy Award in 2022.
