= Omdurman =

Largest city in Khartoum State, Sudan

Omdurman أم درمان
- City
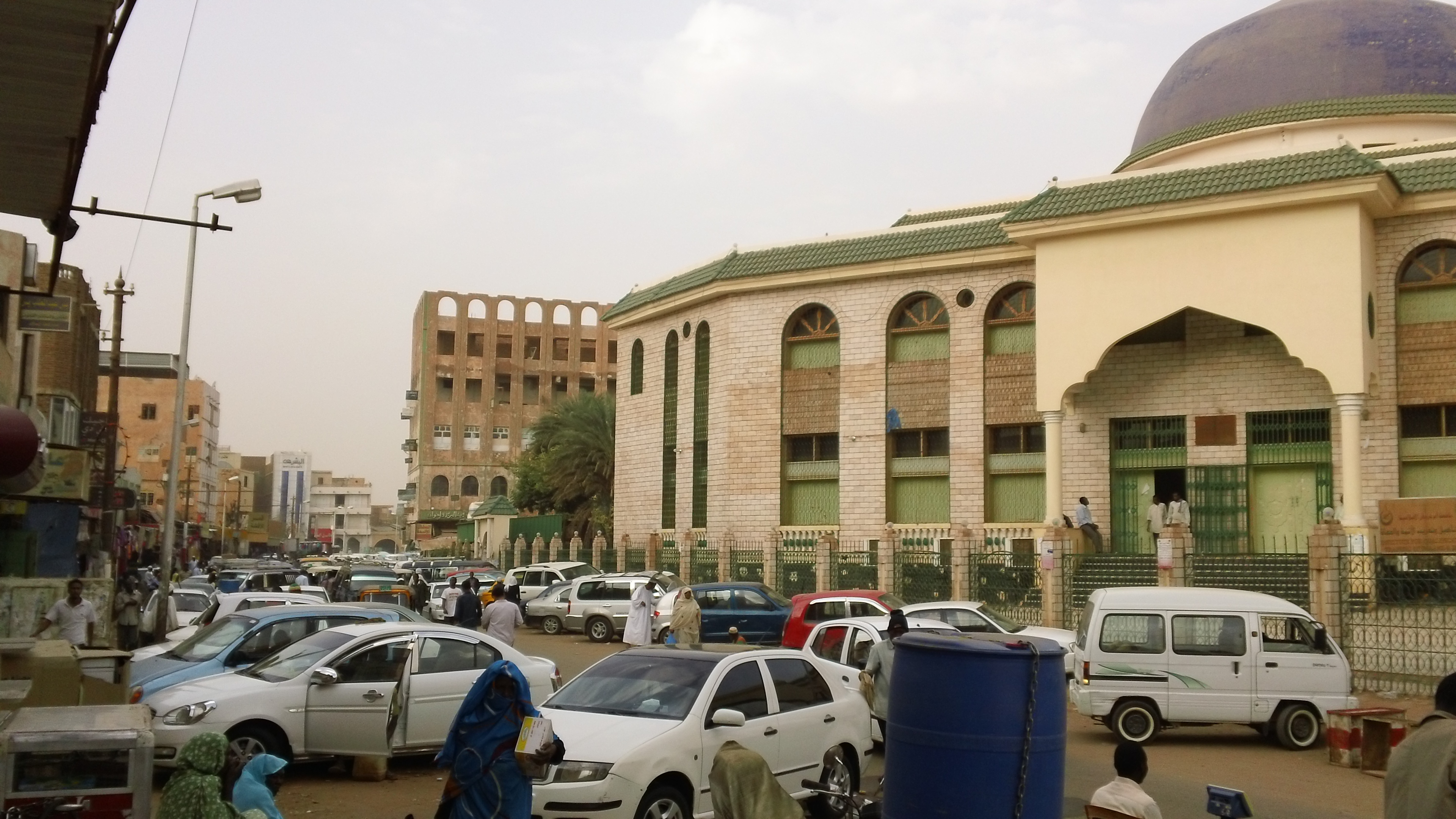
- Omdurman Market

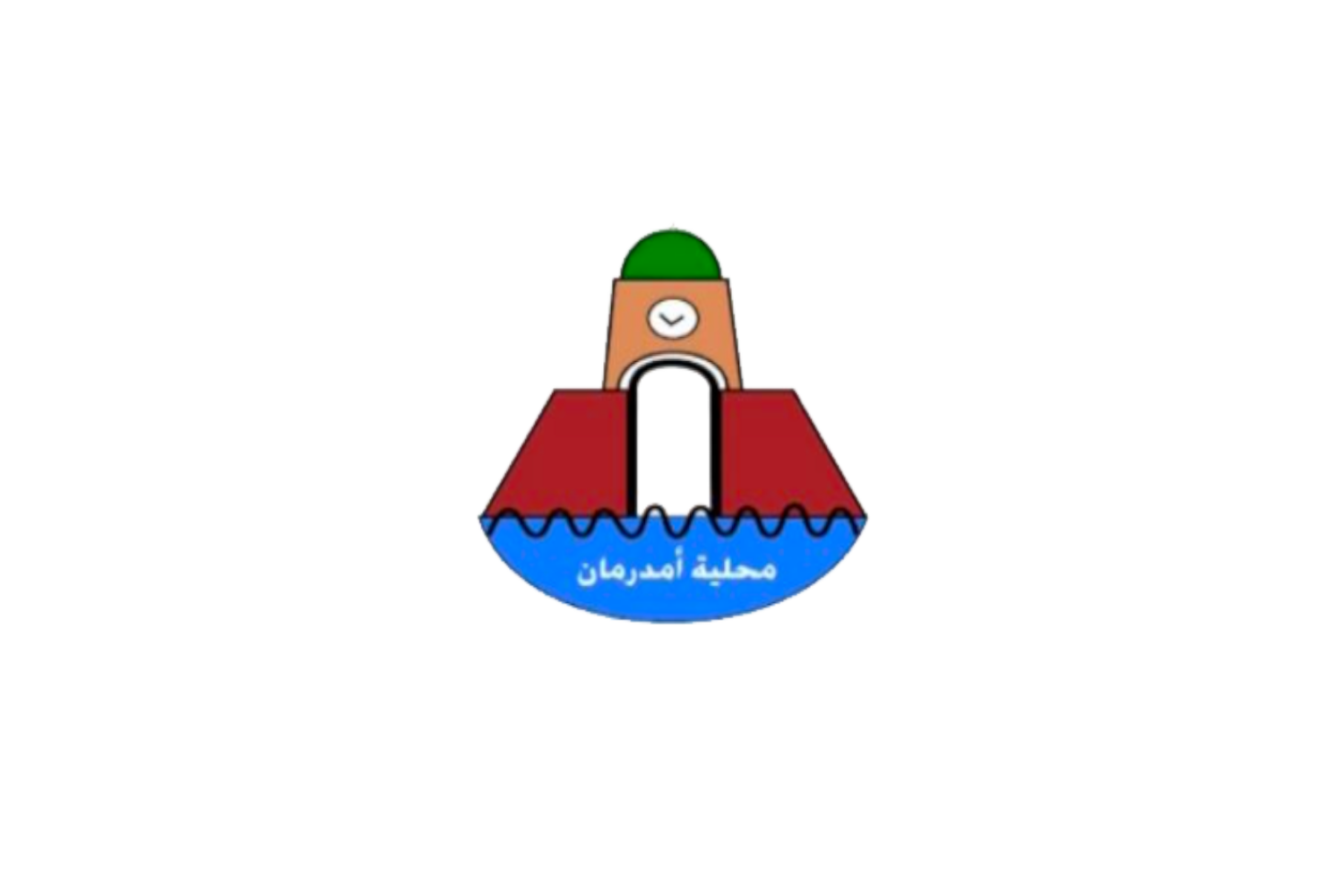
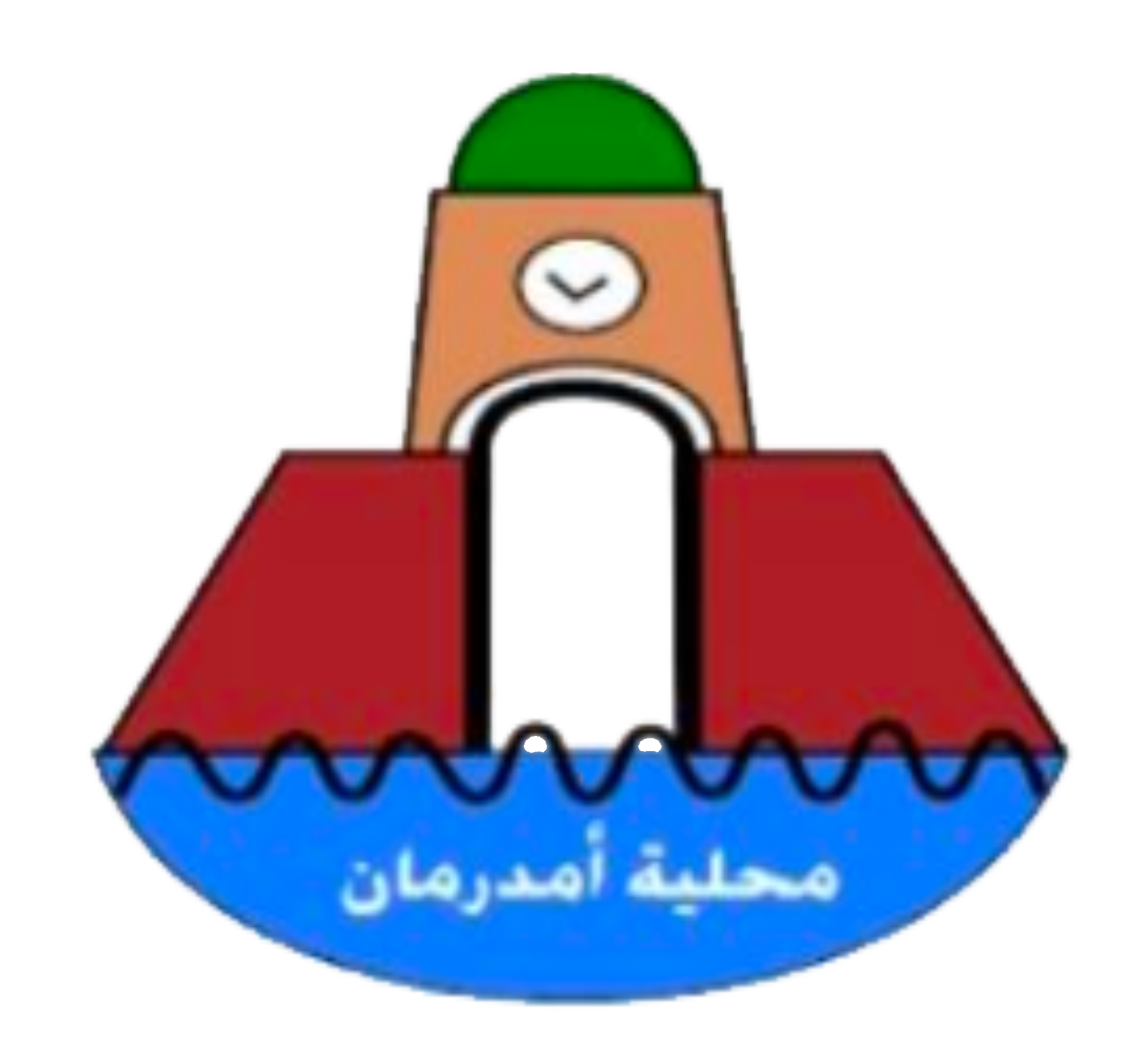
- Flag Seal

- Location in Sudan
- Coordinates: 15°38′25″N 32°28′58″E
- Country: Sudan
- State: Khartoum State

Area
  - Total: 614.9 km^{2} (237.4 sq mi)
- Elevation: 386 m (1,268 ft)

Population (2025)
  - Total: 1,200,000
  - Rank: 2nd
  - Density: 2,000/km^{2} (5,100/sq mi)
- Time zone: UTC+02:00 (CAT)

Omdurman (Arabic: أُمّ دُرمان, romanized: Umm Durmān) is a major city in Sudan. It is the second most populous city in the country, located in the State of Khartoum. Omdurman lies on the west bank of the River Nile, opposite and northwest of the capital city of Khartoum. The city acts as an important road hub, with the Nile boosting transportation even further.

== Etymology ==
The name Omdurman (Umm Durmān) literally translates as "Mother of Durmān", but who she was or might have been is unknown.

== History ==
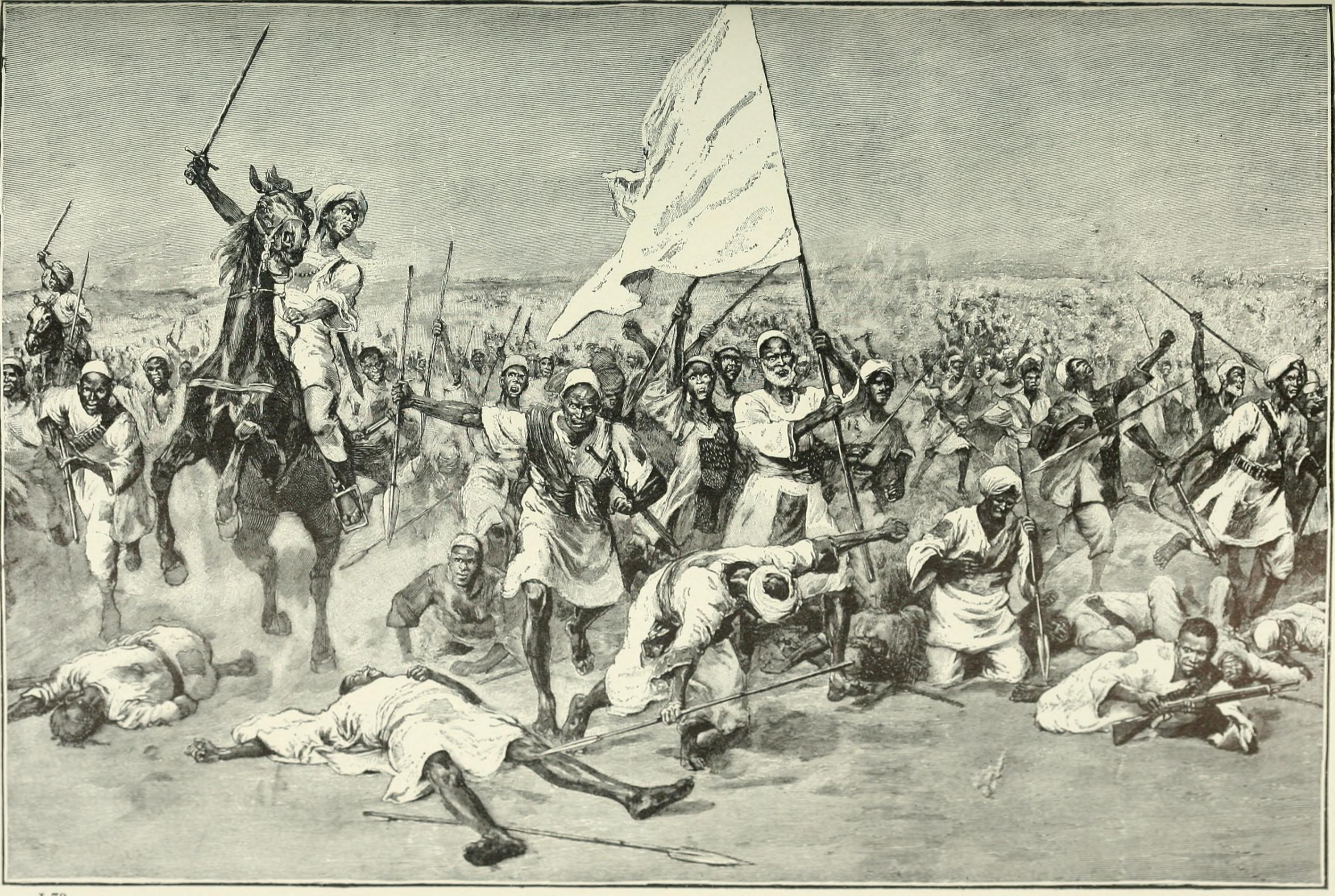
The Battle of Omdurman in 1898

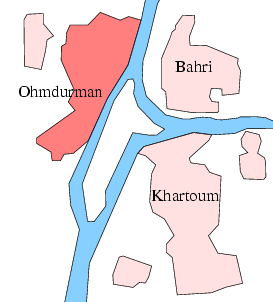
A sketch map of Omdurman with Khartoum and Bahri. The White Nile flowing from the south is joined by the Blue Nile flowing from the east.

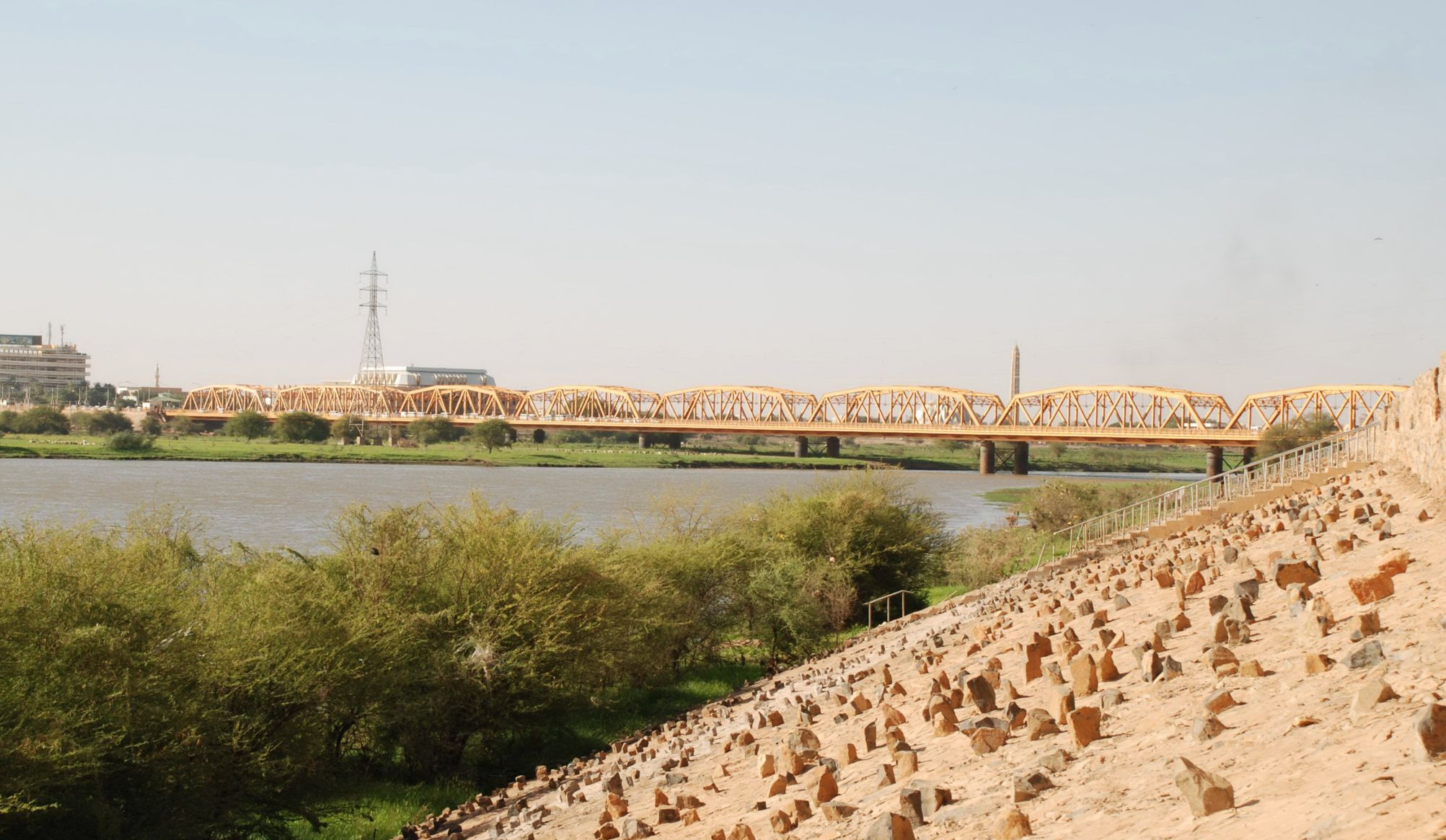
Bridge over the White Nile which connects the city to Khartoum

After the siege of Khartoum, followed by the building of the tomb of the Mahdi after his death from typhus, the city grew rapidly. However, in the Battle of Omdurman in 1898 (which actually took place in the nearby village of Kerreri), Lord Kitchener decisively defeated the Mahdist forces. The following year British forces defeated Abdallahi ibn Muhammad, the Khalifa, as the Battle of Umm Diwaykarat; ensuring British control over the Sudan.

In September 1898, the British army of twenty thousand well drilled men equipped with the latest arms, Maxim guns and Martini-Henry rifles under the command of General Horatio Herbert Kitchener invaded Sudan. In the battle of Omdurman, the British Army faced Sudanese defenders consisting of over 52,000 poorly armed desert tribesmen dervishes; in the space of five hours the battle was over. The Sudanese defenders suffered many casualties, with at least 10,000 killed. By contrast there were fewer than four hundred casualties on the British side with forty-eight British soldiers losing their lives. Then, General Kitchener proceeded to order the desecration of the Mahdi's tomb and in the words of Winston Churchill, "carried off the Mahdi's head in a kerosene can as a trophy".

Kitchener restored Khartoum as the capital and, from 1899 until 1956 Sudan was jointly governed by Great Britain and Egypt. Although most of the city was destroyed in the battle, the Mahdi's tomb was restored and refurbished.

On 10 May 2008, the Darfur rebel group of the Justice and Equality Movement moved into the city where they engaged in heavy fighting with Sudanese government forces. Their goal was to topple Omar Hassan al-Bashir's government.

During the Sudanese civil war, the city was occupied by the Rapid Support Forces between April 2023 and May 2025.

== Geography ==
=== Neighbourhoods ===
- Ombadda

=== Climate ===
Omdurman features a hot arid climate, with only the summer months seeing noticeable precipitation. The city averages a little over 155 millimetres (6.1 in) of precipitation per year. Based on annual mean temperatures, the city is one of the hottest major cities in the world. Temperatures routinely exceed 40 °C (104 °F) in mid-summer.

Its average annual high temperature is 37.1 °C (99 °F), with six months of the year seeing an average monthly high temperature of at least 38 °C (100 °F). Furthermore, throughout the year, none of its monthly average high temperatures falls below 30 °C (86 °F). During the months of January and February, while daytime temperatures are generally very warm, nights are relatively cool, with average low temperatures just above 15 °C (59 °F).

Climate data for Omdurman
Month	Jan	Feb	Mar	Apr	May	Jun	Jul	Aug	Sep	Oct	Nov	Dec	Year
Mean daily maximum °C (°F)	30.8 (87.4)	33.0 (91.4)	36.8 (98.2)	40.1 (104.2)	41.9 (107.4)	41.3 (106.3)	38.4 (101.1)	37.3 (99.1)	39.1 (102.4)	39.3 (102.7)	35.2 (95.4)	31.8 (89.2)	37.1 (98.8)
Mean daily minimum °C (°F)	15.6 (60.1)	17.0 (62.6)	20.5 (68.9)	23.6 (74.5)	27.1 (80.8)	27.3 (81.1)	25.9 (78.6)	25.3 (77.5)	26.0 (78.8)	25.5 (77.9)	21.0 (69.8)	17.1 (62.8)	22.7 (72.9)
Average precipitation mm (inches)	0 (0)	0 (0)	0 (0)	0 (0)	.4 (0.02)	4.0 (0.16)	46.3 (1.82)	75.2 (2.96)	25.4 (1.00)	4.8 (0.19)	.7 (0.03)	0 (0)	156.8 (6.18)
Average precipitation days (≥ 0.1 mm)	0	0	.1	.1	.9	1.2	4.8	4.8	3.2	1.2	0	0	16.3
Average relative humidity (%)	27	22	17	16	19	28	43	49	40	28	27	30	29
Mean monthly sunshine hours	141	211	260	330	360	390	400	390	365	300	260	180	3,587
Source 1: World Meteorological Organisation (UN)
Source 2: BBC Weather

== Demographics ==
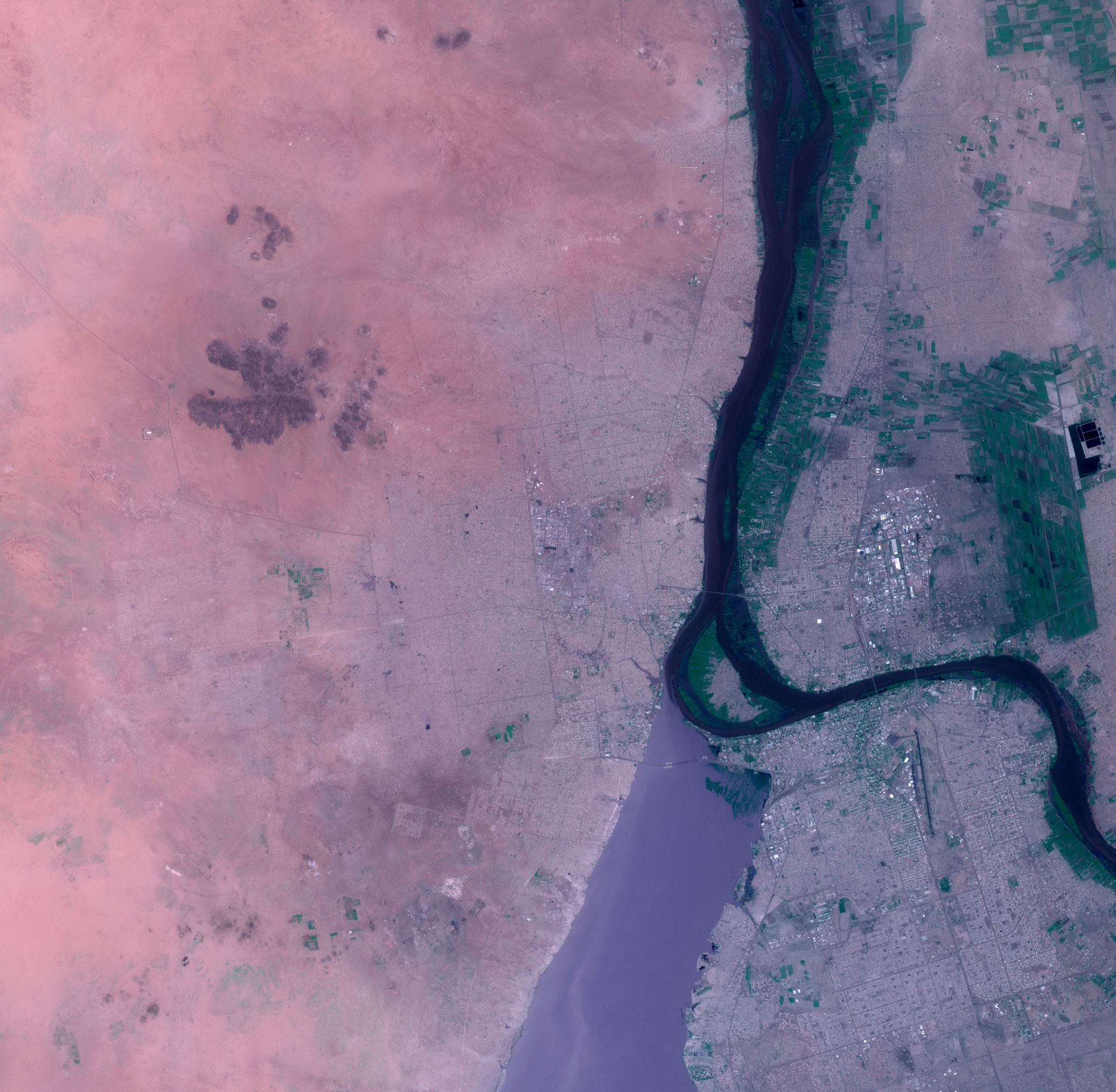
Omdurman is on the western side of the Nile river, opposite Khartoum.

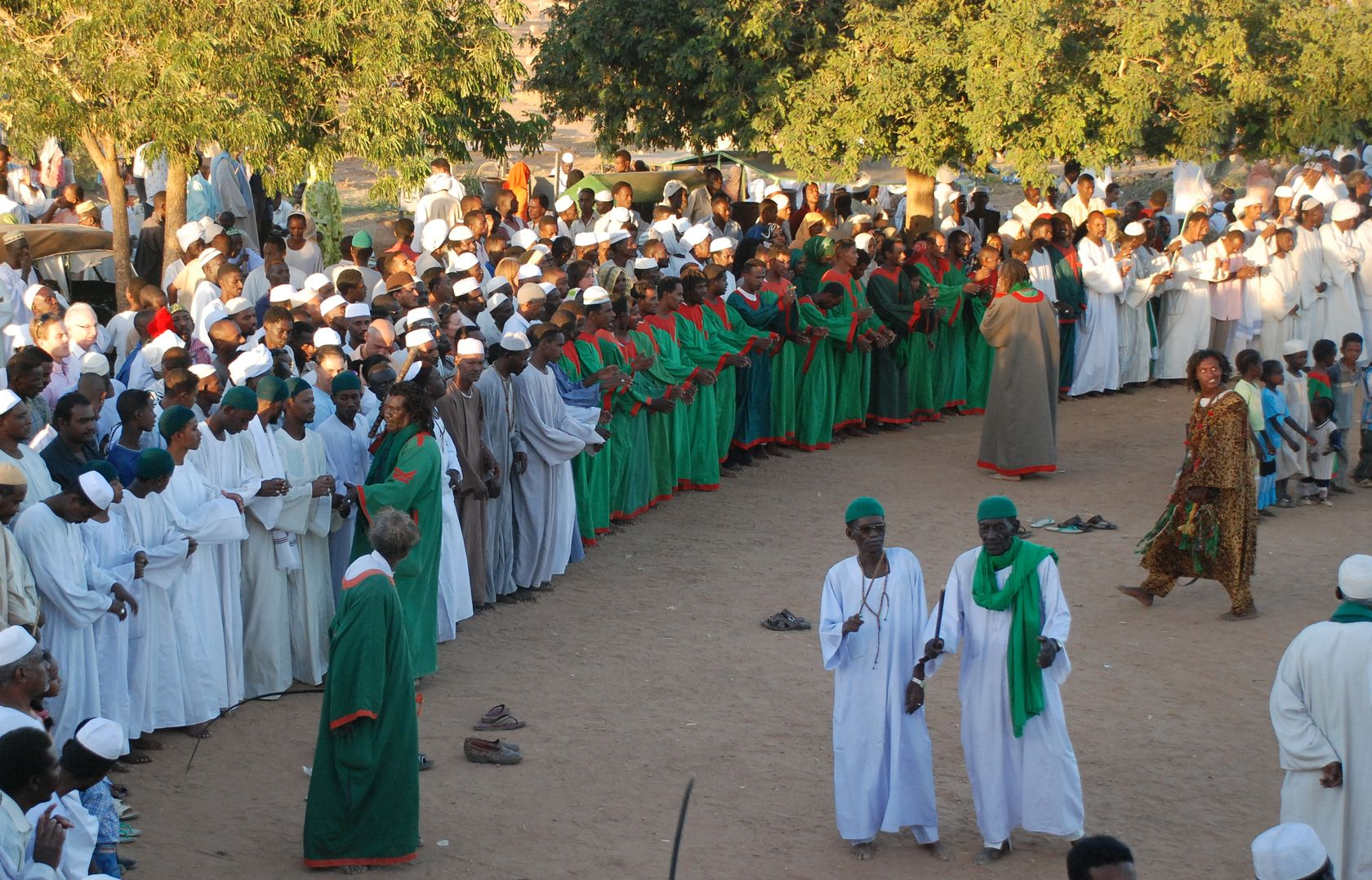
Sufi dervishes in Omdurman

Year	Population
1909 (Census)	42,779
1941	116,196
1956	113,600
1973	299,399
1983	526,284
1993	1,271,403
2007 Estimate	2,127,802
2008	2,395,159
2010	2,577,780

== Education ==
Public universities are:

- Karary University
- Omdurman Islamic University
- University of the Holy Quran and Islamic Sciences

Private universities are:

- Ahfad University for Women
- Omdurman Ahlia University
- University of Science and Technology - Omdurman

== Airport ==
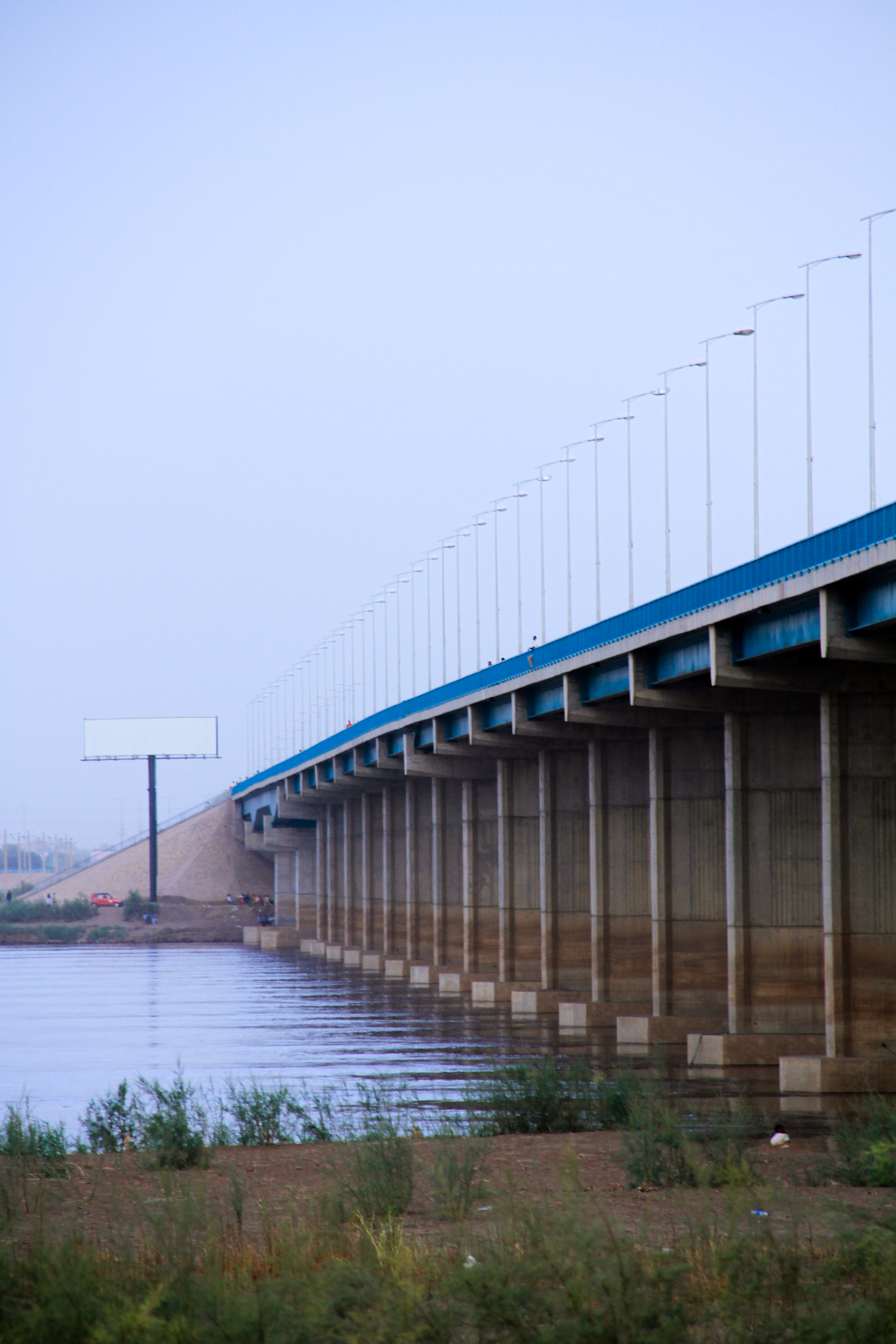
Halfaya Bridge on the Nile linking Omdurman and Khartoum North

Khartoum Airport serves Omdurman.

=== New Khartoum International Airport ===
According to Sudanese officials, in 2005 a new airport facility had been proposed 30 miles (50 km) south of Omdurman. Arguably speaking to be within the non-defined boundaries of Omdurman, the project was estimated to be completed by 2012 with an estimated budget of $530 million. Construction began in 2019; after a suspension in 2021, construction was completed in December 2025.

Omdurman's location in the center of the country, almost within the national capital, facilitates its connection to all the capitals and cities of the various states of Sudan, by land via paved roads and seasonal roads. Within the city, transportation varies from yellow taxis, city buses, and other buses of various sizes, known as "buses." Three-wheeled motorcycles, known as "tuk-tuks" and known in Khartoum as "raqshas," are also used, in addition to trains and Nile ferries.

Omdurman is one of the three capital cities and is therefore connected to Khartoum and Khartoum Bahri by several bridges built over the Blue and White Nile rivers.

== Notable people ==
- Haga Kashif Badri, human rights activist
- Widad Ibrahim Elmahboub, astrophysicist and engineer
- Gasim Badri, professor
- Salih Basheer, photographer
- Ola Alsheikh, photographer
- Kamala Ibrahim Ishaq, Sudanese painter
- Omer Khairy, artist
- Ibrahim El-Salahi, former diplomat
- Hussein Shariffe, filmmaker
- Nancy Agag, singer
- Kamal Tarbas, singer
- Mohamed Badawi, singer
- Rasha (singer)

== See also ==
- Al-Nilin Mosque
- Bant (Omdurman)
- Khalifa House Museum
