= University of Khartoum =

Public university in Sudan

- جامعة الخرطوم
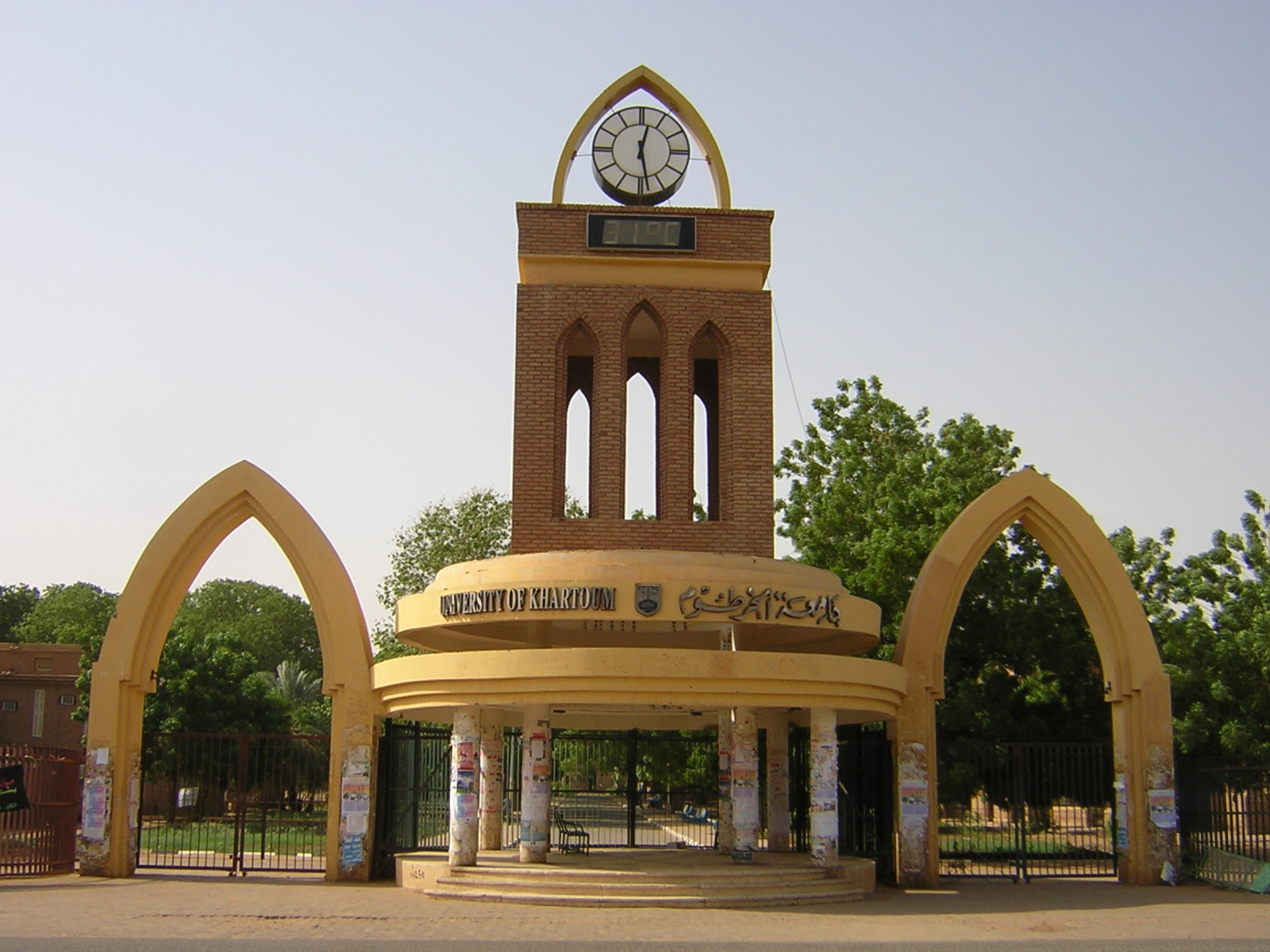
- University of Khartoum entrance
- Former names: Gordon Memorial College (1902–1951); University College Khartoum (1951–1956)
- Motto: الله - الحقيقة - الوطن - الإنسانية; Allah - al-Haqiqa - al-Watan - al-Insaniyya
- Motto in English: God - Truth - Our Country - Humanity
- Type: Public
- Established: 1902; 124 years ago as Gordon Memorial College, 1956; 70 years ago as University of Khartoum
- Vice-Chancellor: Emad El-Deen El-Tahir Aradib
- Students: 16,800
- Location: Khartoum State, Sudan; 15°36′44″N 32°32′32″E
- Campuses: Five
- Website: www.uofk.edu

The University of Khartoum (U of K) (Arabic: جامعة الخرطوم) is a public university located in Khartoum, Sudan. It is the largest and oldest university in Sudan. The University of Khartoum was founded as Gordon Memorial College in 1902 and established in 1956 when Sudan gained independence. Since that date, the University of Khartoum has been recognized as a top university and a high-ranked academic institution in Sudan and Africa.

It features several institutes, academic units and research centers including Mycetoma Research Center, Soba University Hospital, Saad Abualila Hospital, Dr. Salma Dialysis centre, Institute of Endemic Diseases, Institute for Studies and Promotion of Animal Exports, Institute of African and Asian Studies, Institute of Prof. Abdalla ElTayeb for Arabic Language, Development Studies and Research Institute, The Materials and Nanotechnology Research Center and U of K publishing house. The Sudan Library, a section of the university's library, serves as the national library of Sudan. It is also characterized by freedom of expression, and a number of revolutions have ignited from it to bring down unjust governments.

== History ==
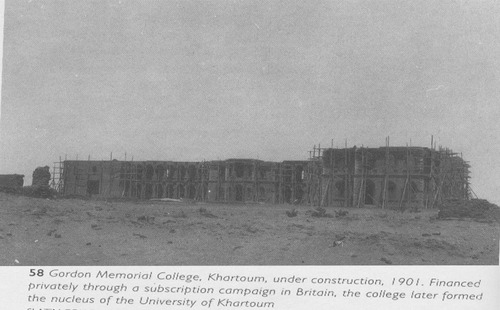
Gordon Memorial College under construction in 1901

In 1898 after Britain gained dominance in Sudan as part of a condominium arrangement, Lord Kitchener proposed founding a college in the memory of Gordon of Khartoum, who was killed in the Siege of Khartoum. The request for donations of £100,000 to build the college was achieved in six weeks and the Gordon Memorial College was founded in 1902 with initially three schools - an industrial school and two higher primary schools and a small teachers training centre.

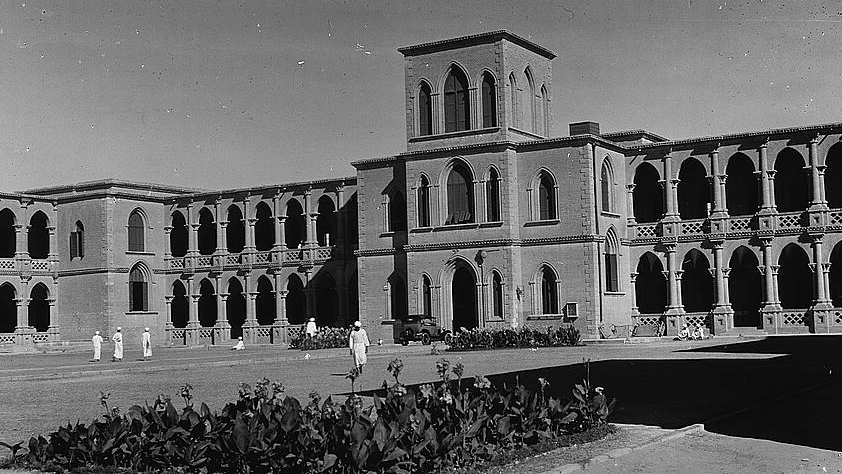
Gordon College 1936

By 1906, the college was also offering programs for training assistant engineers, land surveyors and primary school teachers. The first equipped laboratory for bacteriological analysis was added in 1905, with donations from Sir Henry Wellcome, an American-British pharmaceutical entrepreneur and archaeologist. There was also an affiliated Military school.

In 1924, it was decided to make the college a wholly secondary institution with the college incorporating programs in Sharia, engineering and surveying, education (teachers training), clerical work, accounting and science. Primary and military schools were removed. The Kitchener School of Medicine, the first medical school in Sudan, was also established that year.

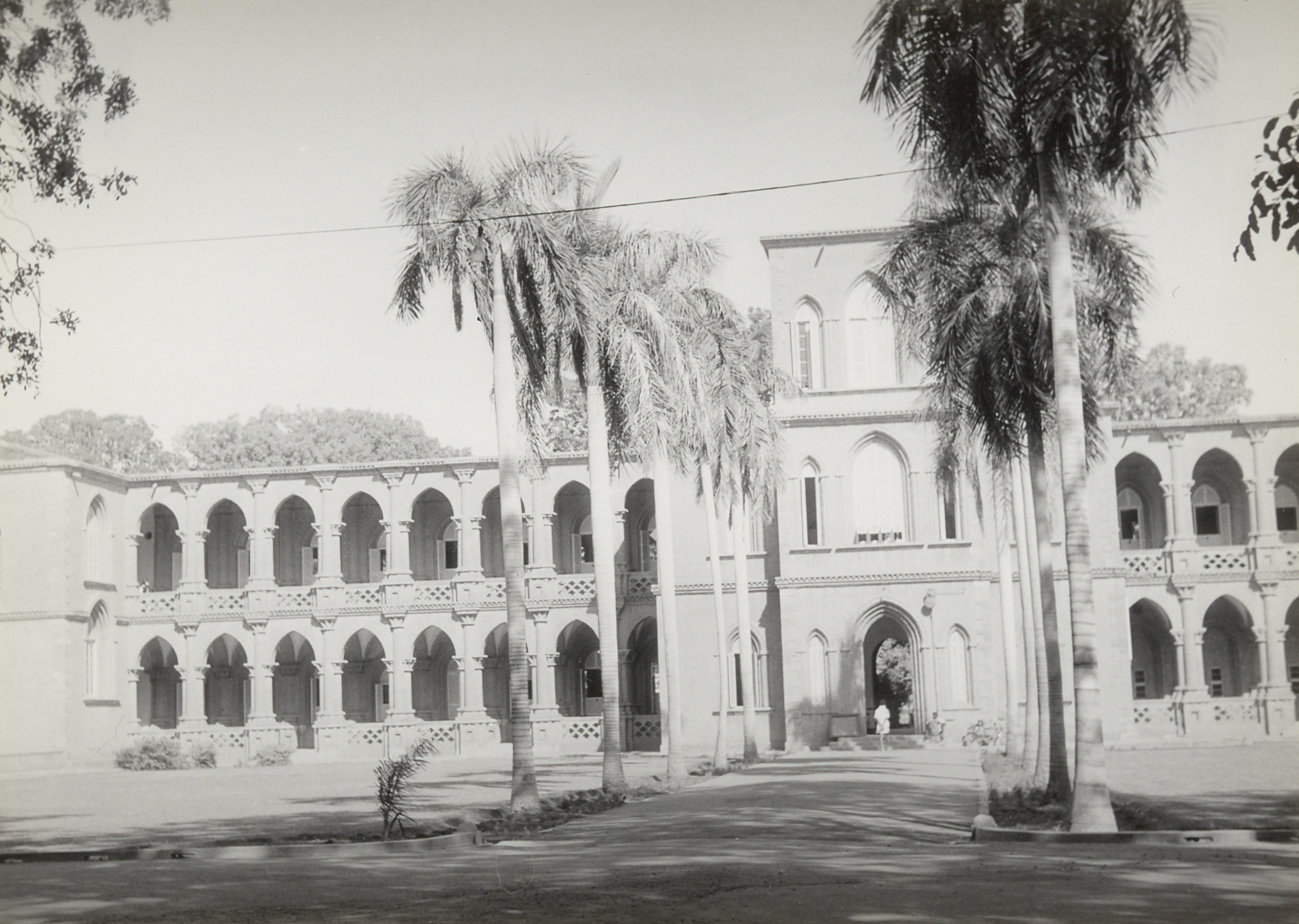
Main building of Khartoum University. A palm lane leading up to the pointed arched entrance of a symmetrical building with galleries on two floors, 1961.

Dates for the establishment of further schools were; 1936 School of Law, 1938 School of Agriculture and Veterinary Science, 1939 Science and Engineering and 1940 Arts. In 1947, the college was affiliated with The University of London as the first overseas participant in its "special relationship" scheme. The first graduates to receive University of London degrees completed their programs in 1950. The next year, Gordon Memorial College was formally renamed University College Khartoum, which incorporated the Kitchener School of Medicine.

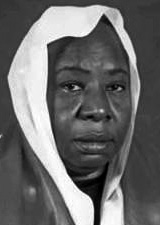
Khalida Zahir, graduated as the first Sudanese female doctor in 1952

When Sudan gained independence in 1956, the new Parliament passed a bill to award university status to Khartoum University College. It officially became Khartoum University on 24 July 1956. The eminent horticultural scientist John Pilkington Hudson was a visiting professor in 1961–1963, who founded its department of horticulture.

On 5 April 1984, the Government announced the closure of all faculties of the university. The university was reopened fully on August 1.

The university was closed several times after the 1989 military coup d'état for the intensive participation of its students in pro-democracy rallies.

=== Recent history ===
In the early days of the Sudanese civil war (2023-present) in April 2023, at least one student was killed and some injured by gunfire and the university was shut down for days while eagerly seeking support to evacuate dozens of people stranded and sheltering on campus. The same student was buried on campus later.

The campus was located in a besieged enclave and occupied by the Sudanese Armed Forces. The Army used the school as a barracks and headquarters before being ousted by the Rapid Support Forces (RSF). In September 2024, the Sudanese Armed Forces launched a major offensive in Khartoum and retook the university. The school was heavily damaged, with various buildings ransacked.

== Student body ==
The university has 16,800 undergraduate students in 23 faculties, schools and graduate research institutes. The annual admission rate is 3,500 students, 55% of whom are female. There are 6,000 graduate students (graduate diploma, M.Sc. and Ph.D.). It has 850 teaching staff (faculty), 20 research fellows and 500 teaching assistants.

== Campuses ==
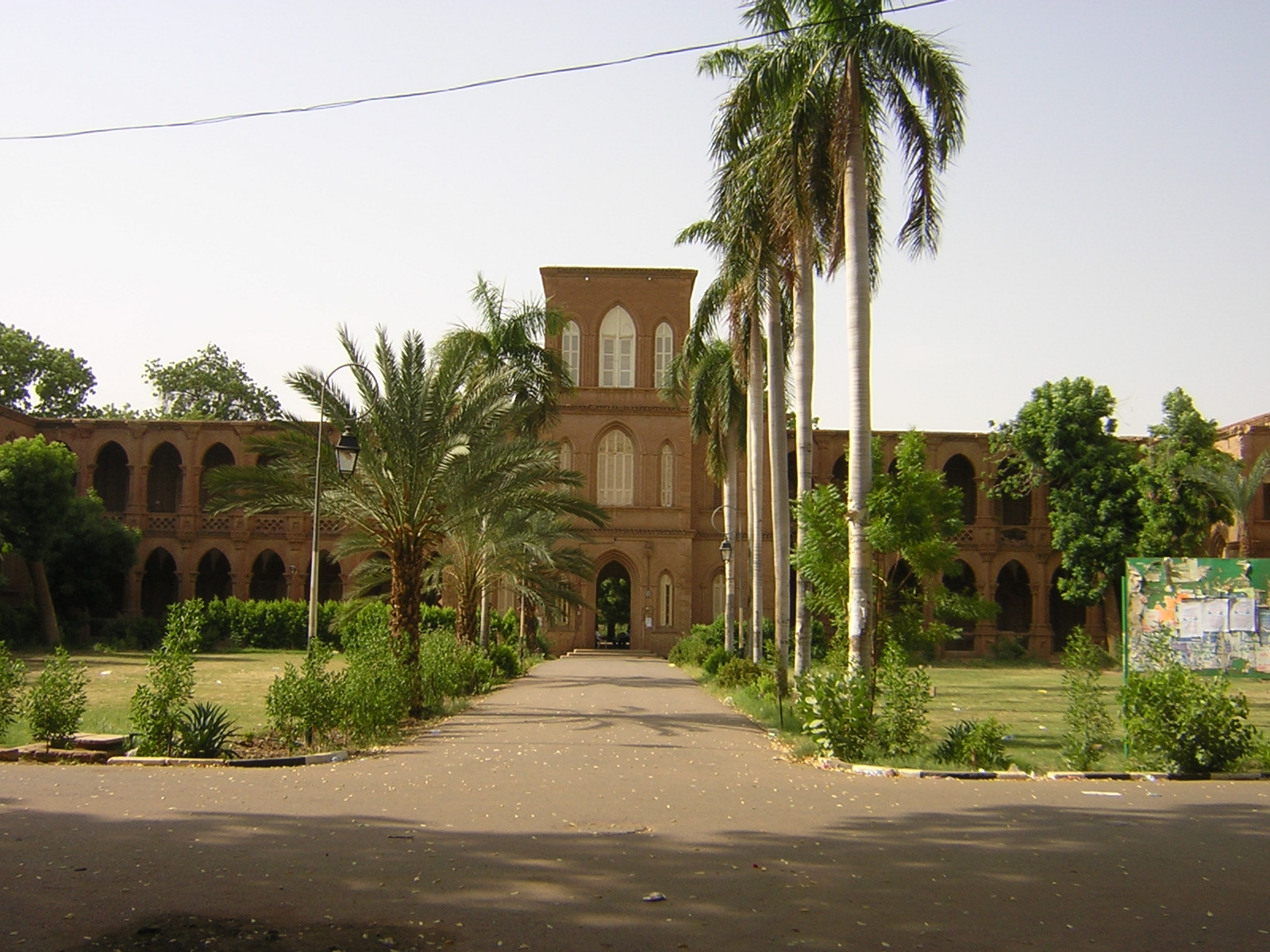
Palm avenue and British colonial era Faculty of Science building

There are four campuses:

- The Central Campus in Central Khartoum.
- The Medical Campus located in the North of Central Khartoum.
- The Agriculture and Veterinary Campus at Shambat, Khartoum North.
- The Faculty of Education Campus at Omdurman 15 km from central campus.
- Suba Campus (Faculty of Medical Laboratory Science, Suba Hospital) at Suba, 20 km South of Khartoum.
- The management studies campus in central Khartoum.

== Admission ==
Undergraduate admission policy is governed by the Board of Higher Education of Sudan, which sets the minimum admission requirement for high school students based on their national origin (Sudanese vs. non-Sudanese) and the high-school certificate board.

For post-graduate studies, the requirements are on the university admission webpage.

Students of University of Khartoum engage in workshops, lectures, debates, forum activism, book clubs and political parties. Sporting activities include university sports championship tournaments and Sudan colleges championship tournaments.

== Faculties ==
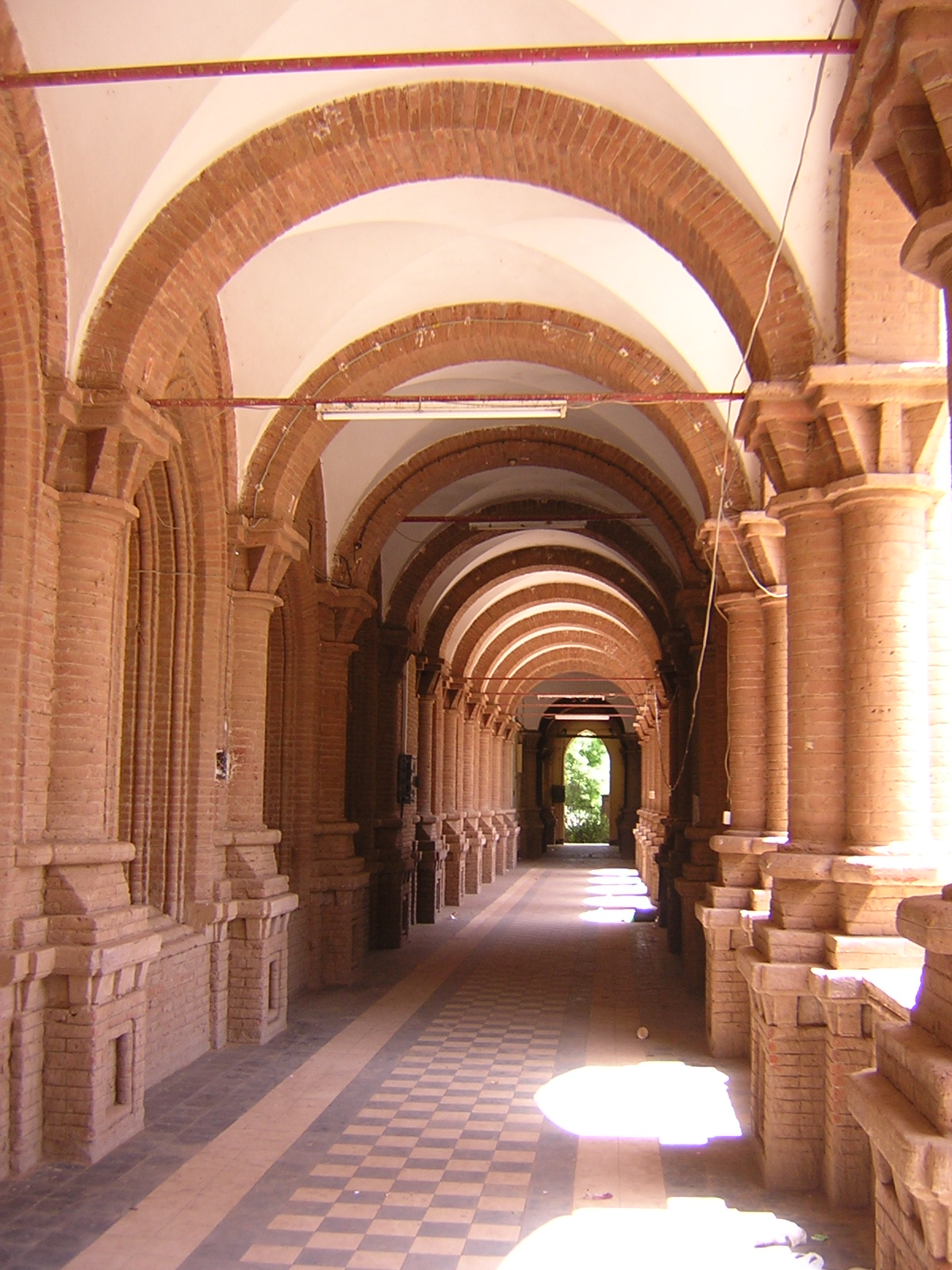
Arcade at Faculty of Science

- Faculty of Arts
- Faculty of Law
- Faculty of Science
- Faculty of Nursing Sciences
- Faculty of Medicine
- Faculty of Pharmacy
- Faculty of Dentistry
- Faculty of Engineering
- Faculty of Architecture
- Faculty of Mathematical Sciences
- School of Management Studies
- Faculty of Economic and Social Studies
- Faculty of Education
- Faculty of Agriculture
- Faculty of Forestry
- Faculty of Animal Production
- Faculty of Veterinary Medicine
- Faculty of Geographical and Environmental Sciences
- Faculty of Technological and Developmental Studies
- Faculty of Public and Environmental Health
- Faculty of Medicine

=== Historical Background of Faculty of Geographical and Environmental Sciences ===
it was the Department of Geography established in 1945 as a unit in the School of Arts, University College of Khartoum which became the University of Khartoum in 1956, and the Unit became a department thereof. Administratively, it was a department in the Faculty of Arts. Still, its academic and research activities transcend the faculty's boundaries to various faculties and institutes within the university, like the faculties of Economics, Engineering, Architecture, Science, Agriculture, Forestry, Education, Medicine, and institutes of Environmental Studies, Afro-Asian Studies, Urban Studies and Development Studies and Research. The department occupies a two-storey building. The northern wing comprises sixteen staff offices and the GIS laboratory, while the lecture halls, the library, and the cartography laboratory are located in the southern wing. The Faculty has been established under the University Council resolution No.129 on 12/12/2010 as an upgrading of the old Geography Department, Faculty of Arts, which was established in 1945, and is located in the university main campus in a two-building complex. The Faculty was established with a scientific vision to cope with the tremendous scientific advances and changes induced by the information revolution and globalization. Faculty of Geographical and Environmental Sciences includes the following departments: (Geographical Information Systems and Cartography - Environment and Ecology - Human and Population Studies - Planning and Development)

=== Faculty of Public and Environmental Health ===
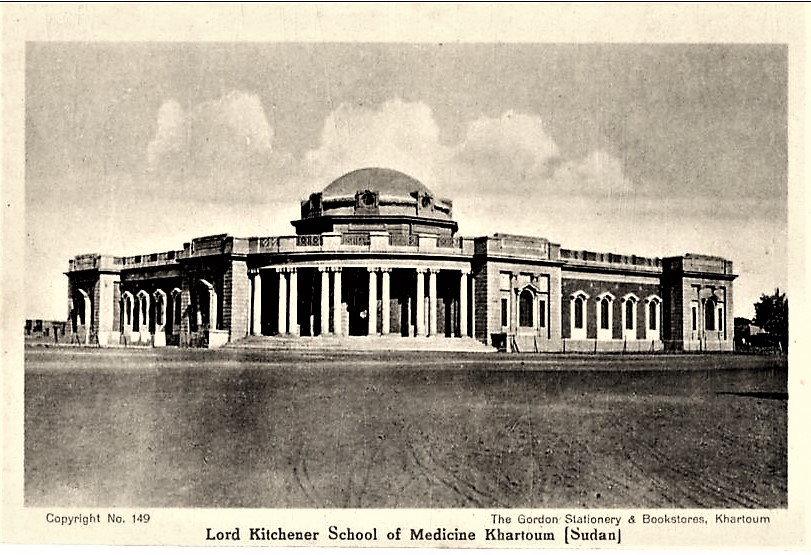
Kitchener School of Medicine Khartoum 1937

Faculty of Public and Environmental Health, University of Khartoum, includes the following departments: (Food Hygiene and Safety - Health Education - Epidemiology - Environmental Health and Environmental Studies). The college awards a bachelor's degree in Public and Environmental Health in four years. The Bachelor of Science in Public and Environmental Health Honors in five years. Master's degree in Public and Environmental Health in one of six specialties (Public Health -Food Hygiene and Safety - Health Education - Epidemiology - Environmental Health- Medical Entomology)

=== Faculty of Medical Laboratory Science ===
The Faculty of Medical Laboratory Sciences was founded in 1966 under the name "School of Medical Laboratory Technicians" as a joint venture between the Faculty of Medicine, University of Khartoum and the Ministry of Health. Its development was continued until in 1993 an ordinance was passed for the establishment of the College of Medical Laboratory Sciences an independent institution affiliated to the Ministry of Higher Education and Scientific Research. In 1997, it was merged with the University of Khartoum as the Faculty of Medical Laboratory Sciences (FMLS). The Faculty of Medical Laboratory Sciences offers preparation for careers in medical (clinical) laboratory sciences. A career in medical laboratory sciences is a great way to combine an aptitude for science with the desire to help others. Medical Laboratory Scientists, also known as clinical laboratory scientists, are highly skilled professionals who perform analytical tests on blood, tissue, and body fluids to provide laboratory information for the detection, diagnosis, and treatment of human diseases. There also is a growing trend for medical lab scientists to perform wellness laboratory testing aimed at preventing disease. Degrees Awarded: General B.Sc.: 4 years Honor B.Sc.: 5 years M.S.c: By courses M.Sc.: By research PhD: By research Departments of the Faculty of Medical Laboratory Sciences:

==== Department of Microbiology ====
It is one of the biggest departments in FMLS, it includes the following disciplines: Medical Bacteriology, Medical Virology, Medical Mycology, and Immunology.

==== Departments of Haematology and Immunohematology ====
Deals with all aspects related to blood, its components and related diseases such as anaemia, cancer, and also blood transfusion.

==== Department of Parasitology and Medical Entomology ====
Teaches the knowledge of pathogenic parasites such as malaria, worms such as Schistosomes and insect vectors of diseases.

==== Department of Chemical Pathology ====
Deals with everything related to body chemistry including but not limited to chemical shifts in the body due to diseases, hormonal balance, enzymes, trace elements and toxicology.

==== Department of Histopathology and Cytology ====
Focuses on identifying the composition of cells and tissues of the body and the change in their composition due to chronic cases. Division of the Department: Cytopathology, Histotechniques, Immunohistochemistry, Cytogenetics, Molecular Pathology, Cellular pathology

=== Faculty of Dentistry ===
Faculty of Dentistry was established in 1971 as a school that belong to the Faculty of Medicine. It was the first in Sudan to provide dental training. In 1992 it upgraded to a separate faculty. The school now has approximately 60 outstanding faculty and staff and 600 students enrolled in BDS degree programs, 90 postgraduate and 90 dental technology.

==== Academic programs ====
1. B.D.S. (five years)
2. Intermediate Diploma in dental technology (three years)
3. M.Sc. in wide variety of specialties (two years)
4. Ph.D. in wide variety of specialties (three years)
5. DDS - RD (four years)
6. DDS - Dental Specialty (four years)

==== Facilities ====
1. Dental Clinics
2. Phantom Head Lab
3. Dental Laboratory
4. Museum
5. Histopathology Lab
6. Dental Radiology Unit
7. Library and e-library

==== Center for MFDRCSI Examinations ====
By the end of 2011, Faculty of Dentistry became the only center in Africa for examinations of the Diploma of Member of Faculty of Dentistry, Royal College of Surgeon in Ireland (NNJ). Part 1 exam is held twice a year and Part 2 is once a year. In all the previous exams, faculty graduate achieved outstanding grades.

==== Association of Dental Students- University of Khartoum (ADSUK) ====
Faculty of Dentistry Student have an association through which they can realize a lot of their activities. It is a member in the International Association of Dental Students (IADS). ADSUK organized one of the most successful IADS' conferences in Khartoum in 2006. One of the most programs arranged by ADSUK are the Health Field Trip where students as well as staff member travel to rural areas and stay there to give distant citizens dental services and to educate them.

== Research centers ==
University of Khartoum plays a leading role in scientific research and development through a number of specialized research centers and institutes:

- Institute of Endemic Diseases
- Professor Abdalla Eltayeb Institute for Arabic Language
- Institute of African and Asian Studies
- Building and Road Research Institute (BRRI)
- Development Studies and Research Institute
- Mycetoma Research Center
- Institute of Environmental Studies
- Materials and Nanotechnology Research Center

=== Libraries ===
The University of khartoum library, known as the "Main Library," is one of the biggest and oldest libraries in universities in Sudan and Africa. The library houses over 400,000 volumes, including special collections such as the Sudan Collection and Newbold Collection. The library building represents the historical and iconic heritage of the University of Khartoum. In addition to the Main Library, there are small libraries in each faculty and institute as well as Altegany Almahi library for postgraduate students and Sudan Library.

== ICT ==
University of Khartoum has an Information Technology and Communication Center which is responsible for developing and managing of the ICT infrastructure of the university. All university campuses are connected by dedicated high-speed links (fiber optics); WiFi covers most of the campuses and electronic registration on the university website. In addition to the ICT centre, the Faculty of Mathematical Sciences has its own Information Technology research unit which is active in developing and promoting Open Source software in Sudan.

== Notable academics ==
- Michael Grant, prolific British classicist, was vice-chancellor from 1956 to 1958.
- Wendy James, British anthropologist who was a lecturer in social anthropology from 1964 to 1969; she was later a professor at the University of Oxford.
- Sir Marriott Fawckner Nicholls, the British prominent genitourinary surgeon, was professor of surgery from 1964 until his death in 1969.
- Daniel Pedoe, English-born mathematician and geometer

=== Vice-chancellors ===
Since the independence of Sudan, highly qualified Sudanese were appointed to the position of University of Khartoum vice chancellor.

== Notable alumni ==
=== Politics ===
- Abdalla Hamdok, a public administrator who became the 15th Prime Minister of Sudan
- Hassan al-Turabi, leader of the National Islamic Front and former dean of the Faculty of Law
- Ali Osman Taha, former vice president of Sudan
- John Garang, former leader of Sudan People's Liberation Army/Movement
- Francis Deng: Former United Nations' Under-Secretary General
- Ibrahim Abood Ahmed: Former commander in chief of Sudanese military forces and president of Sudan
- Sirr Al-Khatim Al-Khalifa: Former prime minister and minister of education of Sudan
- Mohamed Ahmed Mahjoob: Former prime minister and foreign minister of Sudan
- Ammar Mohammed Mahmoud, diplomat
- Babiker Awadalla: Former prime minister and foreign minister of Sudan
- Rashid Bakr: Former vice president and prime minister of Sudan
- Al-Jazuli Daf'allah: Former prime minister and head of the Sudanese Medical Association of Sudan
- Abdelmahmood Abdelhaleem, Former Sudan's ambassador to the United Nations
- Nisreen Elsaim, youth climate activist and member of the United Nations' Youth Advisory Group on Climate Change
- Usamah Mohamad, citizen journalist and Amnesty International prisoner of conscience
- Nureldin Satti, Sudanese ambassador.
- Nasreldin Abdelbari, Justice Minister of Sudan.

=== Science, technology and medicine ===
- Sharief Babiker: Professor of Electronics at University of Khartoum.
- Elfatih A.B. Eltahir: Professor of Hydrology and Water Resources at MIT.
- Daoud Mustafa Khalid: Professor of Neurology.
- Mansour Ali Haseeb: First Sudanese Professor and first Dean of Faculty of Medicine, University of Khartoum.
- Sulafa Khalid Mohamed Ali: a pioneer in paediatric cardiology in Sudan.
- Abbashar Hussein: Professor of Neurology.
- Mustafa Abdalla Mohamed Salih: Professor of Pediatric Neurology.

=== Art and education ===
- Leila Aboulela: Writer and playwright
- Meena Alexander: Poet and Distinguished Professor of English at Hunter College and the CUNY Graduate Center
- Abdullahi Ahmed An-Na'im: Islamic scholar and Professor of Law at Emory University School of Law
- Mandour Elmahdi: Author, former Principal of the Institute of Education (Sudan) and Director of Education (Saudi Arabia)
- Abdalla Eltayeb: Scholar in the Arabic language
- Ghalia Garelnabi: Archaeologist and museum director
- Awn Alsharif Qasim: Writer, encyclopedist and scholar of Islamic history and of Sudanese dialects
- Tayeb Salih: Novelist

=== Activism ===
- Bahjaa Abdelaa Abdelaa: women's rights activist.

== See also ==
- Education in Sudan
- List of Islamic educational institutions
- List of universities in Sudan
