= Moslem Rahal =

Syrian musician, born 1977

Moslem Rahal مسلم رحال
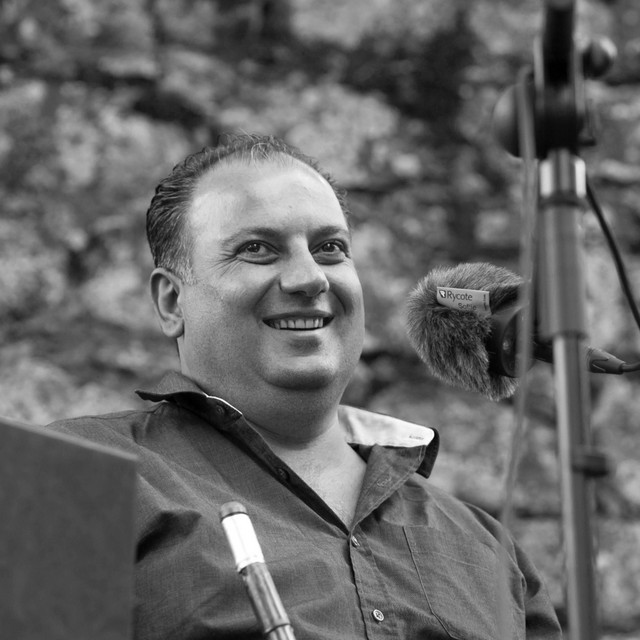

Background information
- Born: 10 September 1977 (age 48); Syria
- Genres: Arabic music, Middle Eastern music, Early Music
- Occupations: Musician, composer, instrument maker
- Instruments: Middle Eastern reed flutes, Ney
- Years active: 2010s–present
- Member of: Hespèrion XXI, Orpheus XXI, Duo Bouhassoun-Rahal
- Formerly of: Syrian National Orchestra for Arabic Music, Syrian National Symphony Orchestra

Moslem Rahal (Arabic: مسلم رحال) is a Syrian musician and composer known for his play of the ney, the end-blown reed flute prominent in Middle Eastern music.

Rahal has notably been a member of various ensembles by Spanish-Catalan musician Jordi Savall since 2013. He has performed internationally in Europe and the Middle East as soloist and ensemble musician in concert halls and festivals in France, Germany and Spain.

== Early life, education and activities ==
Rahal was born on 10 September 1977. He studied at the Higher Institute of Music in Damascus, where he specialised in classical Arabic music and the ney. He graduated in 2003 and taught Arabic music and his instrument at the same conservatory and at the music college in Homs. Further, he performed with the Syrian National Orchestra for Arabic Music and the Syrian National Symphony Orchestra directed by Solhi al-Wadi as well as by Misak Bagboderian. After leaving Syria, he was based in Barcelona, Spain.

== Career ==
Rahal’s work centres on the expressive and technical possibilities of the ney as both a solo and ensemble instrument. Concert programmes have featured multiple neys of varying tunings and sizes, emphasising the instrument’s range within classical and traditional Middle Eastern music.

Rahal has appeared as a soloist and ensemble musician in concert settings across Europe and the Middle East. He has performed programmes presenting traditional Arabic musical repertoire as well as works engaging with Persian and other Near Eastern musical traditions. Both as long-standing member of productions by Spanish-Catalan maestro Jordi Savall and with other ensembles, Rahal has played at venues including the Pierre-Boulez concert hall at the Barenboim-Said Academy in Berlin, Germany, the Philharmonie de Paris, the Opéra de Lyon in France and the Festival Grec of Barcelona.

Rahal has notably been a member of different ensembles directed by Jordi Savall. These ensembles have played at major venues and festivals, including concerts with Orpheus 21 at the Philharmonie de Paris (“Avec la Syrie”) in 2019 and with Hespèrion XXI at the 2017 Festival Grec of Barcelona, where he appeared in the programme Ibn Battuta. The Traveller of Islam as ney and vocal performer under Savall’s general direction.

With Syrian singer and oud player Waed Bouhassoun, Rahal has collaborated in performances combining Syrian vocal repertoire accompanied by the oud and ney. In 2017, Rahal and Bouhassoun participated in outreach concerts organised by the Fundación Centro Internacional de Música Antigua Jordi Savall in Spain, performing musical programmes in non-traditional spaces (e.g., hospital venues) to bring early and intercultural music to diverse audiences.

As a member of the Morgenland All Star Band, Rahal performed at the Morgenland Festival Osnabrück in Germany and at international venues including the Bimhuis in Amsterdam. He is also featured on recordings of the ensemble’s live performances in Beirut.

In addition to performing as a musician, Rahal has been engaged in research and the crafting of traditional instruments, particularly the ney and the kawala.

== Reception ==
International concert presentations and media coverage have described Rahal as a prominent contemporary ney performer and noted his contribution to bringing Syrian musical traditions to wider audiences. The coverage by Euronews of his and Bouhassoun's 2016 performances at the Opéra de Lyon highlighted his role in presenting Syrian musical traditions to European audiences. Announcing a concert of these two musicians for the 2018 Festival of Sacred Music in Perpignan, the Paris-based Maison des Cultures du Monde described their programme as an "intimate and emotional musical creation based on the Nabataean poetry of the Jabal al-Druze in southern Syria".

In a 2019 interview with the French magazine Relikto, Rahal talked about the Orpheus 21 ensemble, initiated by Jordi Savall, which brings together professional musicians under his and Bouhassoun's leadership, many of them refugees from Syria, Afghanistan and Iraq, to share their musical traditions. Rahal explained that Orpheus 21 is unique because it focuses not only on integrating musicians into their new environments but also on preserving and celebrating their cultural heritage. As he pointed out, the musicians transmit their knowledge both through written musical scores and oral tradition, reflecting the diverse ways music is taught and preserved across cultures. The project’s repertoire includes traditional pieces from various countries, including Syria, Iraq, Pakistan, and others, as well as early Western music, thereby creating an intercultural musical dialogue.

On the occasion of a 2026 recital by Moslem Rahal and Ensemble at the Barenboim-Said Academy, the organizers explained the tradition and current role of Middle Eastern music performed by the traditional small ensemble called takht in Arabic: The takht endures as a vibrant musical tradition, embracing both contemplative and lively compositions. Accordingly, its versatility allows it to convey a broad spectrum of emotions and adapt to various musical contexts. Beyond its role as a musical ensemble, the takht represents a cultural tradition, reflecting centuries of artistic heritage as well as a contemporary resonant art form.

For the CD release Oriente Lux: Dialogue of Souls in 2023, Early Music America magazine reported about the idea that started the ensemble Orpheus 21, a multicultural musical ensemble founded in 2016 by Jordi Savall, alongside Waed Bouhassoun and Moslem Rahal. The group unites 20 immigrant musicians from Kurdish, Syrian, Bengali, Sudanese, Turkish, Moroccan, Afghan, and Armenian backgrounds. Its mission is to provide professional opportunities for refugee musicians and to teach refugee children, preserving their musical traditions. Orpheus 21 has been considered the world music counterpart to Savall’s early-music ensemble Hespèrion XXI, and both groups aim to revive and preserve historical and traditional music. According to the report, Bouhassoun and Rahal played a crucial role in maintaining the ensemble’s artistic excellence and "helped hold the Eastern end of this great bridge up to Savall’s high standards."

Asked whether music has always been a refuge for him, Rahal answered:

"Music can help you forget certain difficult things in life or find comfort. It also helps you build yourself up, learn and develop your knowledge, and many other very positive things. But to be honest, music is not a refuge. A refuge would be something that can give you everything, not just help you to forget. A refuge should offer you a new life, strengthen you, and provide you with solutions."

== Selected discography ==
- On The Road To Damascus, with Issam Rafea (2012)
- Hanin: Field Recordings in Syria 2008/2009 (2021)

=== with Jordi Savall, Hespèrion XXI and Orpheus 21 ===
- Orient - Occident II - Homage to Syria (2013)
- Ibn Battuta - The Traveler of Islam (2019)
- Oriente Lux: Dialogue of Souls (2023)

=== with Waed Bouhassoun ===
- La voix de la passion (The Voice of Passion) (2016)
- Safar: Les Âmes Retrouvées (2019)

=== with Morgenland All-Star Band ===
- Dastan (2013)
- Live in Beirut (2015)

== See also ==
- Music of Syria
