= Dima Orsho =

Syrian-American mezzosoprano singer and composer

Dima Orsho ديما اورشو
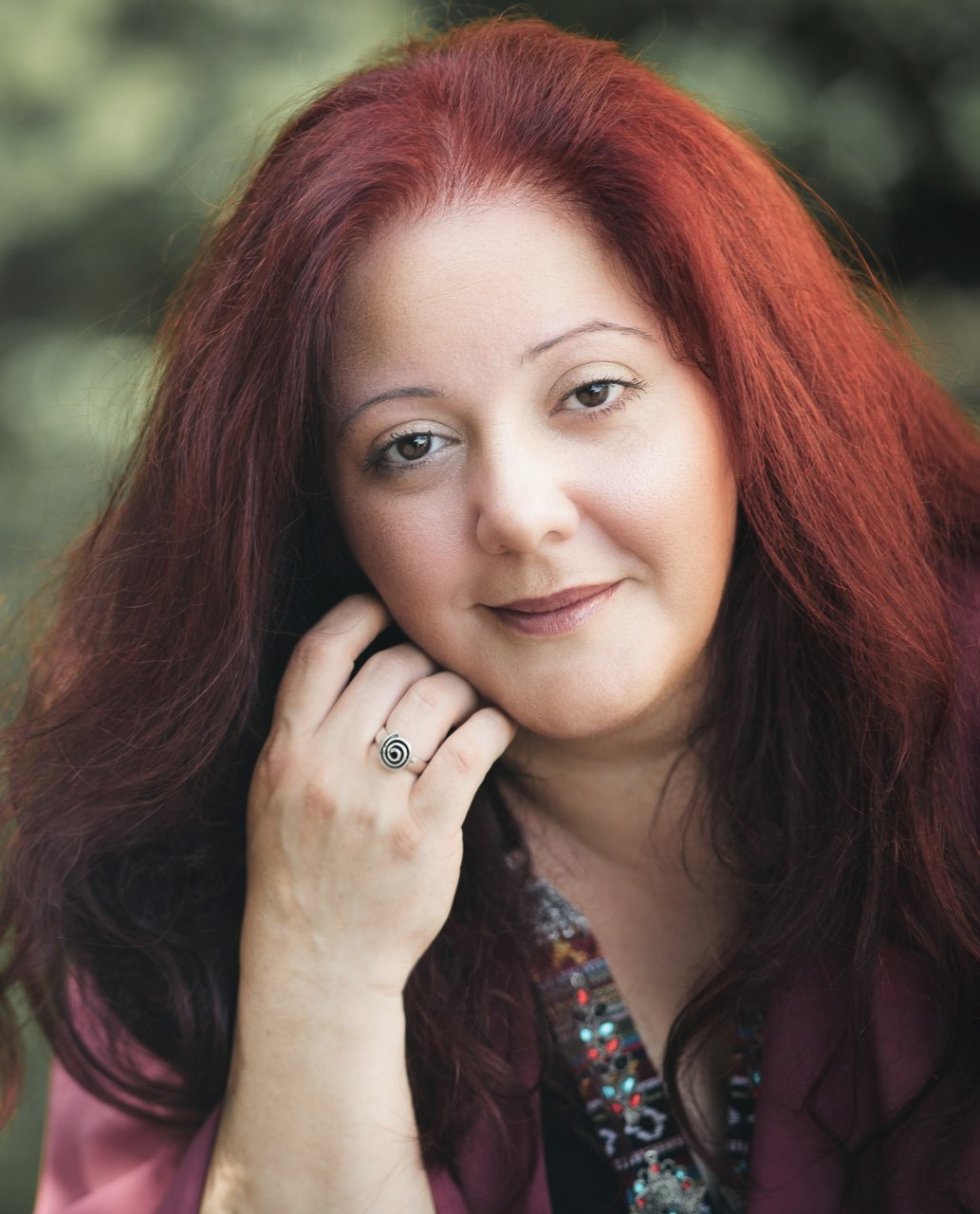
- Dima Orsho In 2023

Background information
- Born: 1975 (age 50–51); Damascus, Syria
- Genres: World music, Arabic music, Contemporary classical music
- Occupations: singer, composer
- Years active: 2005–present
- Labels: Dreyer-Gaido, Deutsche Harmonia Mundi
- Member of: Hewar Ensemble
- Website: www.dimaorsho.com

Dima Orsho (Arabic: ديما اورشو; in Damascus, Syria) is a Syrian-American mezzosoprano singer and composer. She studied first at the Damascus Higher Institute for Music and later at the Boston Conservatory at Berklee. Since 2003, she has been a member of the Syrian Hewar ensemble, alongside Kinan Azmeh, Issam Rafea and others. In July 2022, Orsho sang and played the role of the prisoner Fatma in the premiere of Bushra El-Turk's multi-media opera Woman at Point Zero at the Aix-en-Provence Festival in France.

As guest artist, she has been associated with Yo-Yo Ma's Silk Road Ensemble, Tina Turner, the Morgenland Festival All Star Band or the Baroque music ensemble Musica Alta Ripa. Orsho performs in various musical styles, ranging from Arabic poetic songs or lullabies to world music and jazz-inspired scat singing. Performing with different musical groups, she has given concerts in the Middle East, Europe and the US, including at the Elbphilharmonie and the Barenboim-Said Academy in Germany, the Millennium Stage at the Kennedy Centre and the Library of Congress in the US, the Opéra Bastille and Théâtre de la Ville in Paris, the Bimhuis Amsterdam and the Centre for Fine Arts in Brussels.

== Life and career ==
In 1993 Orsho began her studies as a soprano singer and clarinet player at the Damascus Higher Institute for Music under the direction of composer Solhi al-Wadi. After her graduation, she performed with the Syrian National Symphony Orchestra at the Damascus Opera House, before moving to the United States to study classical singing at the Boston Conservatory, where she earned her master's degree in opera performance.

In Damascus, she joined Kinan Azmeh on the clarinet and Issam Rafea on the oud as well as other musicians of the world music ensemble Hewar in 2003. They have recorded three albums, including Letters to a Homeland. Further, she recorded Arabic poetry set to music by the Syrian pianist Gaswan Zerikly on their album Arabic Lieder. In 2017 Orsho was a guest artist on the album Sing Me Home by Yo-Yo Ma and the Silk Road Ensemble, which was named best world music album at the 59th Grammy Awards.

In 2019, she released her solo album Hidwa - Lullabies for Troubled Times with traditional lullabies from Syria and Azerbaijan, as well as compositions by Manuel de Falla, Gabriel Asa'ad and herself. The same year, she went on tour with the Spanish soprano Nuria Rial and the German Ensemble Musica Alta Ripa, with the release of the album Mother: Baroque Arias and Arabic Songs.

At the annual Morgenland Festival in Osnabrück, Germany, she has appeared frequently, both as singer as well as teacher for workshops. With the Morgenland All Star Band and the Morgenland Festival Orchestra, she performed both in Germany, the Netherlands and in Lebanon. In 2015, Orsho first sang in a chamber music production of Kinan Azmeh's song cycle Songs for Days to Come in Brooklyn, New York City. At the Morgenland Festival in June 2022, Orsho appeared in the operatic version of this cycle of songs and poems based on the Syrian civil war. In a review of this premiere, her dramatic lament after an explosion at the main character’s wedding party was called "especially captivating".

At the Aix-en-Provence Festival in July 2022, Orsho sang and played the role of the prisoner Fatma in Bushra El-Turk's multi-media opera Woman at Point Zero, based on the novel of the same name by Egyptian feminist writer Nawal El Saadawi. Commenting on her different singing styles, ranging from lyrical mezzosoprano to improvised jazz techniques, her interpretation expressed the different aspects of the character and the contemporary classical character of this world premiere. During 2023, this work was also performed in Belgium, Luxemburg, Spain and at the Royal Opera London's Engender Festival. In March 2025, Orsho participated in a new work composed by Bushra El-Turk and based on a libretto by Wajdi Mouawad. Referring both to Mouawad's own biography as well as a well-known song by Umm Kulthum, this music theatre production was titled Oum – A Son’s Quest for His Mother and premiered at the Dutch National Opera house in Amsterdam.

As a composer, Orsho has also written soundtracks for short films and feature films: Under The Ceiling (2005) was directed by Nidal Al-Debs, and the documentary movie "A Comedian in a Syrian Tragedy" (2019) about the life in exile of Syrian actor Fares Helou was directed by Rami Farah.

== Discography ==
- Arabic Lieder, songs and compositions by Gaswan Zerikly
- Hidwa. Lullabies for troubled times
- Sing me home with Yo-Yo Ma and Silk Road Ensemble
- Mother. Baroque arias and Arabic songs, with Nuria Rial and Musica Alta Ripa

with Hewar:

- Hewar 2003
- 9 Days of Solitude 2007
- Letters to a homeland 2012

with Morgenland All Star Band:

- Dastan
- Morgenland All Star Band Live in Beirut

== Notable stage performances ==
- Songs for Days to Come, song cycle by Kinan Azmeh (New York City 2015 and Berlin 2021; operatic version Osnabrück, 2022)
- Woman at Point Zero, opera by Bushra El-Turk, premiere at Aix-en-Provence, 2022, and further performances in 2023
- Oum – A Son’s Quest for His Mother, musical theatre by Bushra El-Turk and Majdi Mouawad, premiere at Dutch National Opera House, Amsterdam
