= Issam Rafea =

Syrian musician and composer

- Born: 1971 (age 54–55); Kuwait
- Origin: Syria
- Genres: Arabic music, Jazz, World music
- Occupations: Musician, composer
- Instrument: Oud
- Website: www.issamrafea.com

Issam Rafea, also written Essam Rafea (Arabic: عصام رافع, born 1971 in Kuwait), is a Syrian musician, music director and composer, noted for his compositions and performances on the Arabic oud, as former director of the Syrian National Orchestra for Arabic Music and for his collaboration with jazz and world music bands. Since 2013, Rafea has lived in Chicago, touring in the US as well as internationally.

== Biography ==
Born in Kuwait to Syrian parents in 1971, Rafea studied in Kuwait and Syria at the High Institute of Music in Damascus. He obtained his B.A. degree in oud and double bass in 1995. Following this, he was director of the department of Arabic Music at the same institute and was teaching both oud and Western harmony. At the same time, he was also active as composer and arranger for Syrian TV and theatre. Among other awards, he obtained the fourth prize at the Cairo Improvisation Competition 2000 and the second prize at the competition for traditional Arab ensembles in Cairo, Egypt, in 1997. Further to solo appearances on the oud with the Syrian National Symphony Orchestra, conducted by Solhi Al Wadi, Rafea has performed internationally in Europe, North Africa, the Middle East and the United States. Among others, he has directed the Middle Eastern Music Ensemble at Northern Illinois University School of Music and participated in the Mediterranean Festival in Algeria, the World Universal Expo in Seville, Spain, the Festival for Spiritual Music in Marseille, France, as well as the Babel Festival in Iraq.

== Ensembles and performances ==
In 2003, Syrian clarinet player Kinan Azmeh, singer Dima Orsho, Issam Rafea and others started the world fusion ensemble Hewar (Arabic for Dialogue). On his website, Azmeh described Hewar as "an attempt to transcend the barriers of cultural disparities and misconceptions, and establish a civilized communication which builds on what brings humans closer together rather than separates them."

At the beginning of the 2000s, Rafea was conductor of the Syrian National Orchestra for Arabic Music (SNOAM) in Damascus, before the civil war in Syria forced him and other members into exile from their homeland. Since 2013, Rafea has lived in Chicago, touring in the US as well as internationally. In June 2016, the orchestra had a reunion concert at the Southbank Centre in London.

In the early 2010s, the Syrian National Orchestra for Arabic Music conducted by Rafea became known internationally for collaborating with British virtual band Gorillaz on their Plastic Beach album track White Flag. In 2010, the Syrian musicians played this song live as guest artists on the Gorillaz Escape to Plastic Beach World Tour. In 2016, they were also featured in the song Crashing Down, over the closing credits of The White Helmets, a documentary film by Orlando von Einsiedel on the Syrian organisation of the same name.

In 2010, musician Jens Christian "Chappe" Jensen, the founder of Danish big band Blood, Sweat, Drum + Bass, went on a trip to Syria and met with Rafea and ney player Moslem Rahal. Both musicians were featured as guest artists on the big band's 2013 album On the Road to Damascus. The album's tune I return to Damascus, inspired by Syrian poet Nizar Qabbani (1923-1998), includes solos by Rafea and Rahal. Sung by Gunhild Overegseth, the English lyrics are as follows:

I return to Damascus
Riding on the backs of clouds
Riding the two most beautiful horses in the world
The horse of passion
The horse of poetry
I return after sixty years
To search for my umbilical cord

— Nizar Qabbani, I return to Damascus

Along with other members of Hewar ensemble, Rafea has appeared at the annual Morgenland Festival in Germany. In June 2022, this festival presented Kinan Azmeh’s first production of a musical theatre Songs for Days to Come, with Rafea and Azmeh playing as musicians at a wedding celebration. The songs and libretto are based on poems by contemporary Syrian poets, expressing the sufferings of the Syrian civil war. Sung in Arabic by Syrian soprano Dima Orsho and the Osnabrück opera choir, the lyrics were meant to express the melody of the Arabic language.

Apart from his participation in Hewar, Rafea was also a co-founder of Syrian ensemble Twais Quartet. In the US, he and Chinese pipa player Gao Hong have appeared in concerts and recorded as a duo with improvisations blending their respective Chinese and Arabic lute instruments. Further, Rafea has also composed the music and played on soundtracks of several movies.

== Discography ==
=== with Hewar ===
- Hewar (Incognito, 2005)
- 9 Days of Solitude: The Damascus Session (Dreyer Gaido, 2006) with Manfred Leuchter (accordion)
- Letters to a homeland (Dreyer Gaido, 2012)

=== with Twais ===
- Insán (Incognito, 2007)

=== with Gao Hong ===
- Life as is: The blending of ancient souls from Syria & China (Innova Records, 2018)
- From our world to yours (ARC Music, 2020), Global Music Awards for both Best Album and Best Instrumentals

=== with other bands ===
- On the Road to Damascus (Blood Sweat Media, 2013) with Moslem Rahal and Blood, Sweat, Drum + Bass
- In the Spirit of... (Blood Sweat Media, 2014), with Palle Mikkelborg and Dave Liebman

== Movie soundtrack ==
In 2010, Rafea won the Best Composer Award at the Dubai International Film Festival for his music in the film Matar Ayloul (September Rain).
