= Missak Baghboudarian =

Syrian conductor of Syrian National Symphony Orchestra

Missak Baghboudarian (Arabic: ميساك باغبودريان; Armenian: Միսաք Պաղպուտարեան; born 1973) is a Syrian musician and conductor of Armenian descent. Since January 2003, Baghboudarian has been assistant conductor and later principal conductor of the Syrian National Symphony Orchestra that has given numerous concerts in Syria, the Middle East, the United States and in Europe.

== Career ==
Born in Damascus, Baghboudarian began his musical education at the Arab Music Institute there with Hader Junaid and Cynthia Al-Wadi, specializing in piano and orchestra conducting. During his studies, he performed in concerts and participated in seminars with Françoise Thinat and Svetlana Navasardyan.

In 1995, Baghboudarian graduated from the Higher Institute of Music in Damascus, after which he worked as a lecturer in orchestral arrangement and as assistant conductor of the Syrian National Symphony Orchestra under the direction of Solhi al-Wadi. The following year, Baghboudarian was assistant in the production of the first opera performance in Syria, Dido and Aeneas by Henry Purcell. Performances took place in the Roman amphitheatres of Bosra and Palmyra and attracted thousands of spectators.

In 1997, Baghboudarian traveled to Italy to continue his academic education. At the Florence Conservatory, he studied composition and conducting with Mauro Cardi and Alessandro Pinzauti. At the Hans Swarowsky Academy in Vienna, he further studied conducting with Julius Kalmar (lecturer at the music academies in Hamburg and Vienna). At the same time, he took part in several master classes, among others with Michael Beck (Germany), Dorel Pascu (Romania), Carl St. Clair (United States), Riccardo Muti (Italy) and Jorma Panula (Finland).

In May 2004, he participated in the opening ceremony of the Damascus Opera House as chief conductor of the Syrian National Symphony Orchestra and conductor of the choir of the Higher Institute of Music. In August 2006, Baghboudarian conducted the student orchestra of the Damascus Youth Orchestra at the Young Euro Classic festival at the Konzerthaus Berlin.

Baghboudarian has worked as a conductor with numerous Syrian and international soloists, including Armenian pianist Armen Babakhanian, Bulgarian pianist Galina Vracheva, Syrian pianist Gaswan Zerikly, Syrian clarinetist Kinan Azmeh and others.

== Awards ==
- Order of the Star of Italy (2010)
