= Art song in Arabic =

The western classical-style art song has attracted many songs on translations of Arabic texts, notably by composers of French mélodies and German Lieder, but few art songs sung in Arabic.

Musical settings of Arabic poetry include Hans Werner Henze's Sechs Gesänge aus dem Arabischen, while other composers such as Francesco Santoliquido have set translations of Persian texts.

Syrian pianist Gaswan Zerikly's project "Arabic Lieder", recorded with the soprano Dima Orsho puts Arabic poetry to western Lieder and song models, with Arabic influences.

Lebanese soprano-composer Hiba Kawas has set Arabic arias for soprano and piano; Lashou Jina and Boukra Btikbari to texts of Ragheda Mahfouz, Limatha Nuhawilu Hatha Assafar, poetry by Mahmoud Darwish, (1992), Min Ghiabika La Yahda'u Ellail, poetry by Hamza Abboud, (1996). Israeli composer Tsippi Fleischer's settings in Arabic include Ballad of Expected Death in Cairo, for mezzo-soprano, 2 violins, viola & piano, A Girl Dreamt She Was a Butterfly, for mixed chorus a capella, and Like Two Branches, cantata for chamber choir, 2 oboes, kanun, cello, & tar-drums.

Lebanese contemporary classical music composer Joelle Khoury, composed in 2008 an Arabic opera monodrama for woman's voice (sung by Fadia Tomb El Hage, Alto). First played by the Belgian chamber orchestra, Fragments ensemble in Beirut, it was also performed May 4, 2012, at Esterházy Palace, Eisenstadt, Austria, by Kremerata Baltica (founded by Gidon Kremer in 1997) and in Switzerland, by TaG ensemble. She also rearranged Arabic traditional folk songs on a contemporary classical music basis. Variations on Imaginary Folk Dances (string orchestra and voice) was commissioned and performed by Kremerata Baltica at Esterházy Palace, Eisenstadt, Austria (2012, Arab-Baltic Spring). In 2014, the piece was performed again in Germany by the Kremerata, along with the piece Of Memories, Folks and I (string orchestra, percussion and voice). Both pieces are based on Middle Eastern folk music, and yet expressed in contemporary style, rendered by the Lebanese Alto Fadia Tomb El Hage.

Lebanese composer Iyad Kanaan (1971) composed a set of Lieder in Arabic on poems by Saïd Akl for soprano and piano, which were performed in 2011 at Palais des Congrès - Dbayeh.

== See also ==
Opera in Arabic A doctoral thesis entitled “Enabling integration of Arabic Art Song into the Applied Voice Curriculum” has been written by Arabic Art Song specialist Dr. Feryal Qudourah from Florida State University.
