= Zaid Jabri =

Syrian-Polish musical artist, composer, conductor

- Born: 1975 (age 50–51); Damascus, Syria
- Origin: Syria
- Genres: Classical, contemporary classical music
- Occupations: composer, conductor

Zaid Jabri (Arabic: زيد جبري, romanized: Zaīd Ǧabrī) is a Syrian-Polish composer, conductor and music educator, who works at the intersection of Western and Middle Eastern musical traditions. He is one of the representatives of the so-called second generation of Syrian composers of the turn of the 20th to the 21st century. This generation also includes Syrian musicians and composers such as Shafi Badreddin, Kareem Roustom, Raad Khalaf, Kinan Azmeh, Hassan Taha and Basilius Alawad and has been characterized as "transforming modern Arab music into a contemporary space for experimentation."

Jabri lives and works in Krakow, Poland, and has been a member of the Association of Polish Composers since 2011. He received creative recognition very early and made a significant contribution to the development of contemporary Syrian music in just a few years of active work. Works by Jabri have been performed throughout Europe, North America and the Middle East. Concerts with his music took place in Armenia, Belgium, Canada, Egypt, England, France, Germany (Berliner Philharmoniker), Greece, Iceland, Italy, the Netherlands, Poland, Russia, Syria, Tunisia, Ukraine, the United Arab Emirates and in the USA (Carnegie Hall, New York).

Jabri has received several awards and distinctions, among others from the Harvard Radcliffe Institute for Advanced Study, Rockefeller Foundation/Bellagio Center, and Columbia University's Institute for Ideas & Imagination. He has been collaborating with musical groups and soloists, has given lectures and held seminars and workshops at universities in Europe and the USA.

== Early life and career ==
Jabri's mother Asma Fayoumi is a renowned modernist artist and his father Ghassan Jabri was a director for television and theatre. Jabri took violin lessons with Riyad Sukar in Damascus and started learning music at an early age. At the age of 19, he moved to Poland to continue his musical education. Jabri earned his M.A. degree from the Academy of Music in Kraków, where he studied composition with Zbigniew Bujarski. After graduating from the Academy of Music in Kraków, he became an intern in the composition class, and also began studying symphonic conducting with the Polish composer Krzysztof Penderecki, who had a great influence on Jabri's music.

In 1997, he received an award for his earliest completed work Two Songs for Soprano and String Orchestra. This prize was awarded at the Composers' Competition named after the Polish opera singer Adamo Didur, traditionally held in the Polish city of Sanok. The jury of the competition drew attention to the fresh and subtle embodiment of the synthesis of Eastern and Western traditions, as well as the depth of immersion in psychologically complex states in the music of the young Syrian composer.

In 1999, Jabri took part in the international music forum for young musicians from Eastern and Western Europe "Musikwerkstatt Buckow" in Germany. In 2006 in Berlin at the festival Young Euro Classic his Trio Bayat for clarinet, violin and cello was performed. Creating this work in 1999, Jabri for the first time set himself the task of combining European polyphony with Arabic maqam.

In 2012, Jabri and eleven other composers from countries around the Mediterranean Sea were invited by the public broadcasting network SWR in Stuttgart, Germany. Each of the participants of this project titled Mediterranean Voices was asked to write an A cappella vocal composition that expresses their Mediterranean identity. Further to the resulting musical performances, several symposia were held in order to highlight the influence of life in a foreign country on the composer's biography.

In 2015, Jabri made his debut at the Linbury Studio Theatre at the Royal Opera House in London, where excerpts from his opera Cities of Salt were performed. The plot of Cities of Salt is based on the 1984 novel of the same name by Jordanian writer Abdul Rahman Munif. The impact of global geopolitical conflicts and environmental destruction on the fate of people in a particular region, artistically presented in Munif's novel, attracted the interest of Jabri and librettists Yvette Christiansë and Rosalinda Morris.

Jabri also has become one of the leading figures of the Syrian avant-garde in academic music. His work has been associated with the organic introduction of modernism into the classical music of the Middle East. As a result of this, the musical production of Syrian composers and musicians has successfully spread through contemporary art platforms in Western and Eastern Europe, as well as in Cairo, Dubai, Istanbul and Damascus. His works presented in these international creative networks have contributed to the international appreciation of modern Syrian classical music. This was made possible by cultural forums such as the international festival of contemporary music Warsaw Autumn, the Days of Polish Music at the Bilgi University in Istanbul, Turkey, and the Morgenland Festival in Osnabrück, Germany.

While living and working in Europe, Jabri did not break ties with Arab culture and with his homeland Syria. In 2004, his music was performed by the Syrian National Symphony Orchestra conducted by Missak Baghboudarian with the participation of Syrian clarinetist Kinan Azmeh at the inauguration of the Damascus Opera House.

== Musical works ==
Jabri's works have been described as "a discourse on the intersection of Western and Middle Eastern musical traditions." At the very beginning of his career, Jabri set himself the task of combining European polyphony with the Arabic maqam. About this, Jabri said: "You don't need Arabic instruments to play Arabic music. We can play Bach on the Oud. I use microtones and create melodies that sound in the Middle East." For the composer, music is "the most abstract art". In this way, Jabri approached the creation and development of Middle Eastern academic music as Syrian form of Sonorism.

His chamber opera Southern Crossings, based on a libretto of a fictitious meeting between 18th-century astronomer John Hershel and Charles Darwin and including references to the British slave trade, was premiered in New York City in June 2022.

Works by Jabri have been performed at international music forums by ensembles such as Gidon Kremer's Kremerata Baltica, the Neue Vocalsolisten Stuttgart, the Deutsches Symphonie-Orchester Berlin, the Teatro Comunale di Bologna, the Berlin Philharmonic Chamber Orchestra, the Polish National Radio Symphony Orchestra, the National Philharmonic Orchestra of Armenia and the Syrian National Symphony Orchestra.

== Awards and distinctions ==
Jabri is a laureate of international scholarships and music competitions. In 2011, he was admitted to the Polish National Union of Composers. In 2013, he won the Second Prize at the International Composing Competition “2 Agosto” in Bologna, Italy, with the composition Les Temps des pierres for baritone and symphony orchestra. In 2014, Jabri received a George Evans Memorial Fellowship at the Virginia Center for the Creative Arts in the U.S., and in 2015, a Rockefeller Foundation/Bellagio Center Fellowship. In 2016-2017, he was a research fellow at Harvard Radcliffe Institute for Advanced Study. He was also a Norwegian University of Science and Technology (NTNU) fellow in Trondheim, Norway. In 2018/19, he was a Fellow at Columbia University's Institute for Ideas & Imagination.

== Sources ==
This article incorporates text from a free content work. Licensed under CC BY-NC-ND 4.0. Text taken from Transforming Space: The Production of Contemporary Syrian Art Music, Humanities Commons.

- Belyaeva, E. V. (2018), Tvorchestvo kompozitorov Sirii: osnovnye puti razvitiya (vtoraya polovina XX – nachalo XXI veka) — Dissertaciya na soiskanie uchenoj stepeni kandidata iskusstvovedeniya (PDF) (in Russian), Kazan: Na pravah rukopisi, archived from the original (PDF) on 2021-10-25
