= Hewar =

Jazz fusion band from Syria

- CD Letters to a homeland, 2012

Background information
- Origin: Damascus, Syria
- Genres: Jazz fusion
- Years active: 2003–present
- Labels: Incognito, Dreyer Gaido
- Members: Kinan Azmeh; Dima Orsho; Issam Rafea

Hewar (Arabic: حوار "Dialogue") is a jazz fusion band from Syria, formed in 2003. The band and its members are mainly known for their three CDs and concerts in the Middle East, Europe, Asia and the US. Further, founding members Kinan Azmeh, Dima Orsho and Issam Rafea have performed and recorded their compositions inspired by Western and Arabic traditions as well as jazz influences with other Middle Eastern and European musicians.

== History ==
Hewar was founded in 2003 by Syrian clarinetist Kinan Azmeh and oud player Issam Rafea. Having graduated from the Higher Institute for Music in Damascus, they later became members of the Syrian National Symphony Orchestra, playing Western and Arabic classical music. As they also enjoyed international jazz and pop music, they decided to compose their own music, blending influences from their West-Eastern training with musical improvisation. Initially, Hewar included Badi Rafea on percussion, Simone Mreysh on drums and Khaled Omran on double bass. Dima Orsho, a soprano singer who had studied opera singing at the Damascus conservatory and later in the Netherlands, joined the band adding her ability to sing both in Arabic, opera and jazz styles. Their first public concert took place in September 2003 in the Orthodox al-Zaytun church in the historical quarter of Damascus for an audience of 1,500 people.

What we create is not Arabic music, but it's not classical music either. It is a mixture of everything we like listening to and what we feel musically reflects our everyday lives. I've spent my life studying western classical music, but I live here, in Syria, where Arabic music is played everywhere. So of course it automatically flows into my improvisations.

— Kinan Azmeh, Syrian-American musician

In 2004, Hewar performed in 10 cities in the US, including the Kennedy Center and MIT campus. During later years, they played in France, the United Kingdom, Japan, Lebanon, Egypt and in German concert halls such as the Elbphilharmonie Hamburg. Their first CD Hewar was published by the Lebanese Incognito label the following year, with further albums by the German publisher Dreyer-Gaido. Guest musicians on the second and third albums were German accordionist Manfred Leuchter, duduk player Jivan Gaparyan from Armenia and Lebanese percussionist Rony Barrak. Since the three founding members emigrated to the US, Tunisian-British violinist Jasser Haj-Youssef and Syrian cellists Basilius Alawad or Kinan Abou-Afach joined the band. Both as members of Hewar as well as individual artists, Azmeh, Orsho and Rafea have also been part of the Morgenland Festival Osnabrück in Germany.

== Discography ==
- Hewar (2005).
- 9 Days of Solitude: The Damascus Session (2007), featuring Manfred Leuchter, accordion
- Letters to a Homeland (2012), featuring Jivan Gasparyan, Rony Barrak, Andreas Müller, Morgenland Chamber Orchestra

== See also ==
- Music of Syria
