= Another Day (1979 film) =

- يوم آخر
- Directed by: Saheb Haddad
- Written by: Sabah Atwan; Saheb Haddad; Mohamed Shukri Jameel
- Produced by: Adwar Moria; Anspecil Bertomo
- Starring: Shaza Salem; Bahjat Al Jubouri; Khalil Shawki; Awatef Naeem
- Music by: Solhi al-Wadi
- Production companies: Iraq Department of Cinema and Theatre
- Release date: 1979
- Language: Arabic

Another Day (Arabic: يوم آخر) is an Iraqi tragic film released in 1979.

== Synopsis ==
The events of the film take place before the 14 July Revolution and show struggles between peasants (fellahin) and feudal lords (iqta') during the period.

== Crew and cast ==
=== Crew ===
- Screenwriters: Sabah Atwan, Saheb Haddad, Mohamed Shukri Jameel
- Director: Saheb Haddad
- Cinematographers: Yusuf Mikael, Nihad Ali
- Music: Solhi al-Wadi
- Producers: Iraq Department of Cinema and Theatre, Adwar Moria, Anspecil Bertomo
- Editing: Saheb Haddad

=== Cast ===
- Shaza Salem
- Bahjat Al Jubouri
- Khalil Shawki
- Awatef Naeem
- Talib Al-Furati
- Fawzi Mahdi
- Qaid Al-Nomani
- Hani Hani
- Rassem Gemayel
- Nahida Alramaah
- Salam Zahra
