= Rajoub =

Rajoub is a surname. Notable people with the surname include:

- Basel Rajoub, Syrian-Swiss saxophone player
- Jibril Rajoub (born 1953), Palestinian politician, legislator, and former militant
- Nayef Rajoub (born 1958), Palestinian politician
