= Sanaz =

Sanaz (ساناز; sânâz) is a feminine given name of Persian origin. It is traditionally interpreted as meaning "unique and delicate," combining sa ("likeness") and naz ("delicate"). The name is associated with beauty and elegance and is sometimes poetically interpreted as "a delicate and beautiful flower." In Turkey, the name is also interpreted as a combination of san ("likeness") and az ("few"), conveying the meaning "unique" or "one of a kind." Notable people with the name include:

== Given name ==
- Sanaz (singer) (born 1980), German-Iranian singer and poetess
- Sanaz Marand (born 1988), American tennis player
- Sanaz Mazinani (born 1978), Iranian-Canadian photographer and curator
- Sanaz Minaie (born 1962), Iranian television chef and cookbook author
- Sanaz Toossi (born 1991/92), American playwright and screenwriter
