= Waed Bouhassoun =

Syrian singer and oud player

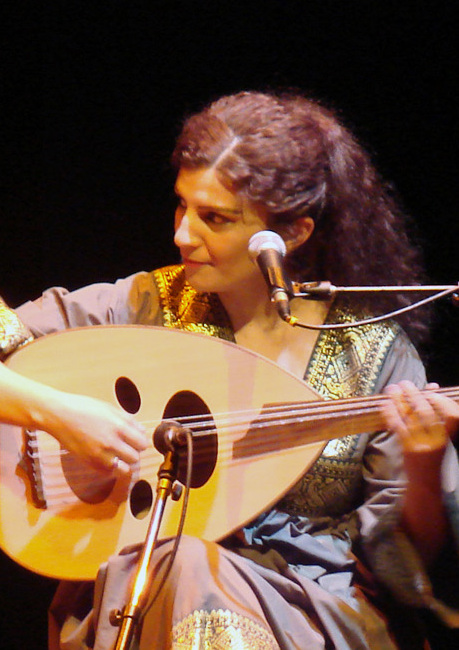
- Waed Bouhassoun playing the oud at a concert in 2010.
- Born: 1979 (age 46–47)
- Occupations: singer and oud player
- Awards: Ordre des Arts et des Lettres, chevalier

Waed Bouhassoun (Arabic: وعد بوحسون) is a Syrian singer and oud player. She has released four solo albums of traditional Syrian music, and toured internationally since 2010. She is a founding instructor-performer for the project "Orpheus XXI – Music for life and dignity," supporting refugee musicians in Europe. In 2018, she was made a chevalier (knight) of the French Ordre des Arts et des Lettres.

== Biography ==
Bouhassoun was born in 1979, and grew up in Shaqqa, a small Druze village near As-Suwayda in southern Syria. She began playing the oud at age seven, taught by her father. In high school, she began to play in regional competitions, and by age 18 had travelled widely in Syria as a performer.

She then entered the Higher Institute of Music in Damascus, where she studied for three years. There were no courses in Eastern singing, so she studied singing for Western opera. Also, when she was asked to learn a Western instrument to play in the Syrian National Symphony Orchestra, she continued to study the oud instead.

In 2005, Bouhassoun had her first performance in France at the Festival de l’imaginaire ("Festival of the Imaginary"), where she sang and played the oud as part of a play. To prepare for a solo performance at the next Festival de l’imaginaire, Bouhassoun travelled to Aleppo in northern Syria to train further as a singer with Arabic musicians. In 2007, she was invited to perform at the Festival of World Sacred Music in Fez, Morocco.

In 2010, Bouhassoun moved to Paris to begin a Masters' degree in ethnomusicology researching Syrian Druze funerals, supervised by the ethnomusicologist Jean Lambert. As of 2016, she was a doctoral student in ethnomusicology at Paris Nanterre University and a member of the Center for Research in Ethnomusicology (CREM). In 2020, she obtained her PhD with a thesis about the female vocal lamentations during the funeral rituals of the Druze.

Beginning in 2016, Bouhassoun was one of the founding instructor-performers for the project "Orpheus XXI – Music for life and dignity," a program led by famous Catalan musician Jordi Savall to support refugees in Europe with traditional music training. The program was funded by the European Commission as part of the Creative Europe Programme on 29 September 2016. It provides employment for refugee musicians and teaches refugee children traditional music from their countries of origin, allowing for the preservation of cultural heritage and personal growth for the participants. The first concerts took place in the summer of 2017, featuring Bouhassoun on the oud.

In 2018, Bouhassoun was made a chevalier (knight) of the French Ordre des Arts et des Lettres (Order of Arts and letters). Bouhassoun remains based in Paris, but continues to return to Syria annually to visit family and do research in ethnomusicology.

== Music ==
Bouhassoun sings in the contralto vocal range and has interpreted both traditional and mystical Arabic poetic lyrics as well as modern poems by the Syrian poet Adonis. She has released four solo albums, each featuring little more than her own voice and oud-playing. Her music has been praised for preserving Syria's rich musical history and for the intimate, minimalist beauty of her songs. Her third album, La voix de la passion (The Voice of Passion), features Nabatean Bedouin dialect poetry, a language originating in the historical region of today's Jordan, that was also spoken in Syria and which she has studied in field surveys for her Masters' degree. On this album, she was accompanied by her former fellow student at the Damascus conservatory, Syrian ney player Moslem Rahal. Apart from her own albums, Bouhassoun has also contributed to three albums by musical ensembles directed by Jordi Savall.

=== Albums ===
- La voix de l’amour (The Voice of Love) (2009), released by the Arab World Institute and distributed by Harmonia Mundi – selected as a "Coup de Coeur" for the year by the Académie Charles Cros.
- L'âme du luth (The Soul of the Lute) (2014), Buda Musique – "Coup de Coeur" of the Académie Charles Cros
- La voix de la passion (The Voice of Passion) (2017) with Moslem Rahal, Buda Musique.
- Les âmes retrouvées (The reunited Souls) (2019), Buda Musique.

=== Participation in Jordi Savall's ensembles ===
- Orient - Occident II - Homage to Syria (2013), Alia Vox.
- Ramon Llull (2016), Alia Vox.
- Granada (2016), Alia Vox.
