= Kinan Azmeh =

Syrian musician (born 1976)

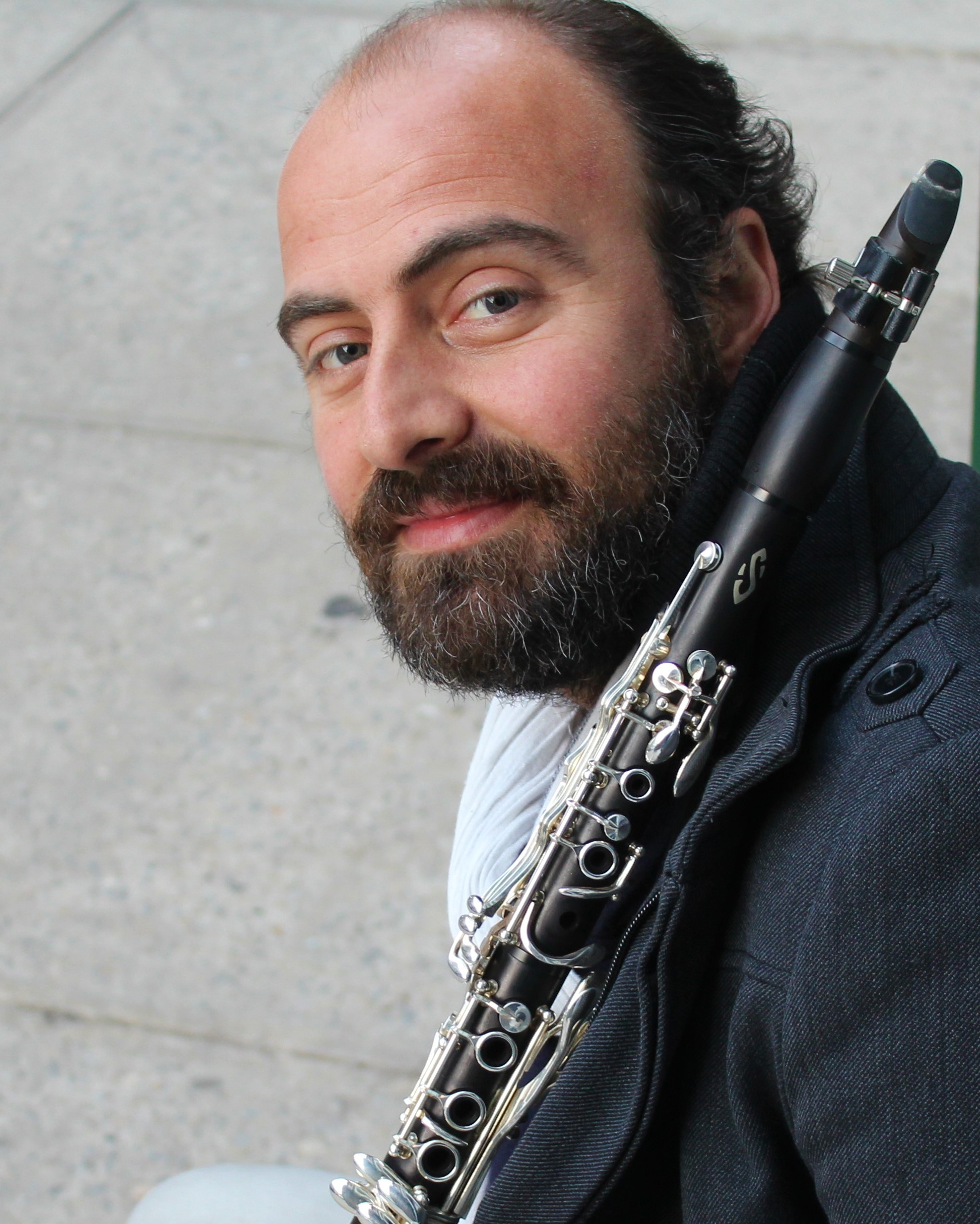
- Kinan Azmeh in 2020

Background information
- Born: June 10, 1976; Damascus, Syria
- Origin: Syria
- Genres: Contemporary classical, Jazz, World music
- Occupations: musician, composer
- Instrument: Clarinet
- Label: Dreyer Gaido
- Member of: Hewar Ensemble
- Website: www.kinanazmeh.com

Kinan Azmeh (Arabic: كنان العظمة, romanized: Kinān Azme, born June 10, 1976, in Damascus), is a Syrian clarinet player and composer of contemporary classical music based in New York City. Performing with orchestras such as the New York Philharmonic, the Seattle Symphony, the Bavarian Radio Symphony Orchestra, the West–Eastern Divan Orchestra, or the Syrian Symphony Orchestra, he has played as a soloist of classical works as well as of contemporary compositions.

== Life and career ==
Born in Damascus, Syria in 1976, Azmeh began to play the clarinet at age six. Originally taking lessons on the violin, he switched to an even-handed instrument that left-handed players did not play too differently from right-handed players. Azmeh studied at the Higher Institute of Music in Damascus. At the University of Damascus, he majored in electrical engineering, at the same time pursuing his studies at the conservatory.

Azmeh received his master's degree and graduate diploma in music from the Juilliard School in New York City. In 1997, he was the first Arab musician to win the first prize in the Nicolai Rubinstein International Youth competition in Moscow, Russia.

Azmeh is based in New York City, where he received his Ph.D. in 2013 at the Graduate Center of the City University of New York with Charles Neidich. From there, he regularly traveled to Damascus, where he played in a Syrian chamber group and has given numerous concerts and workshops. These trips have ended, however, since the beginning of the Syrian Civil War in 2011. In March 2017, Azmeh made international news, because he was unable to return to New York City for some time, following the issuance of Executive Order 13769 by U.S. President Donald Trump.

In 2022, clarinet maker Henri Selmer in Paris published a 160-page notebook for creative exercise and playing on their new clarinet type Muse, written in collaboration with Azmeh.

== Ensembles and performances ==
In 1995, Azmeh joined the Damascus-based pop music band Kulna Sawa (Arabic for: All of us together), founded by composer and songwriter Iyad Rimawi and other young Syrian musicians. They produced two albums and were quite successful in the Middle East. In 2003, Azmeh, singer Dima Orsho, oud player Issam Rafea and others started the Syrian world fusion band Hewar (Arabic for dialogue). On his website, Azmeh describes Hewar as "an attempt to transcend the barriers of cultural disparities and misconceptions, and establish a civilized communication which builds on what brings humans closer together rather than separates them." He claims that Hewar's music draws from a variety of influences, from both the Arab world and the West. In addition, Azmeh plays with the New York City-based City Band and with the band Neolexica. As a student at Juilliard, Azmeh co-founded Neolexica with pianist Dinuk Wijeratne.

In 2009, Azmeh played at the Arabesque Festival at the Kennedy Center in Washington D.C. He has also played with the Syrian National Symphony Orchestra, debuting a clarinet concerto written especially for him by Syrian composer Zaid Jabri at the opening of the Damascus Opera House. In addition, he performed and recorded with Daniel Barenboim's West-Eastern Divan Orchestra, as well as with Yo-Yo Ma's Silk Road Ensemble that won a Grammy Award for the album Sing Me Home in 2017.

Having performed frequently in Germany, for example in Hamburg's Elbphilharmonie, Azmeh is also a frequent guest and workshop mentor of the Morgenland Festival in Osnabrück, Germany. In 2019, he published his double CD "Uneven Sky", with Yo-Yo Ma as guest artist on cello and the Deutsches Symphonie-Orchester Berlin, presenting works by Syrian contemporary composers Kareem Roustom, Zaid Jabri, Dia Succari as well as his own compositions. This album was awarded the prestigious 2019 Klassik Opus Award in Germany.

For Azmeh's 2021 album Flow, his compositions were arranged by Wolf Kerschek and recorded with the Hamburg-based NDR bigband. A review in the German jazz magazine Jazzthetik commented on the opening track: “Above all, Azmeh reveals the essence of his music in this prologue: It's not Arabia, not jazz, not classical, it's all of that - the elements flow into each other." For May 2024, the German NDR bigband announced concerts in New York, Philadelphia and Chicago, featuring Azmeh and music from his album Flow.

In June 2022, the Morgenland Festival presented Azmeh’s composition Songs for Days to Come, his first production of a musical theatre. The songs and libretto are based on poems by contemporary Syrian poets, expressing the sufferings of the Syrian civil war. Sung in Arabic by Syrian soprano Dima Orsho and the Osnabrück opera choir, they are meant to express the melody of the Arabic language.

== Selected discography ==
- Starlighter (2023) with string quartet Brooklyn Rider and percussionist Mathias Kunzli
- Flow (2021) with the NDR Bigband
- Uneven Sky (2019), with Yo-Yo Ma and Deutsches Symphonie-Orchester Berlin, Opus Klassik Award in Germany
- Levant (2018), with Eric Vloeimans and Jeroen van Vliet
- Orient & Occident (2012), with the Mendelssohn Chamber Orchestra
- Elastic City (2012), with the Kinan Azmeh Quartet
- Complex Stories, Simple Sounds (2009), with the Azmeh-Wijeratne Duo
- Syrian Contemporary Chamber Music (2008), with the Damascus Festival Chamber Players
- Rigodon (2007), original sound track
- Musaique (2004), with Kulna Sawa (Syrian pop music band)
- Kulna Sawa (2001), with Kulna Sawa

as member of Hewar (Syrian world music band)

- Hewar (2005)
- 9 Days of Solitude: The Damascus Session (2006) with guest artist Manfred Leuchter (accordion)
- Letters to a homeland (2012)
