= Opera in Arabic =

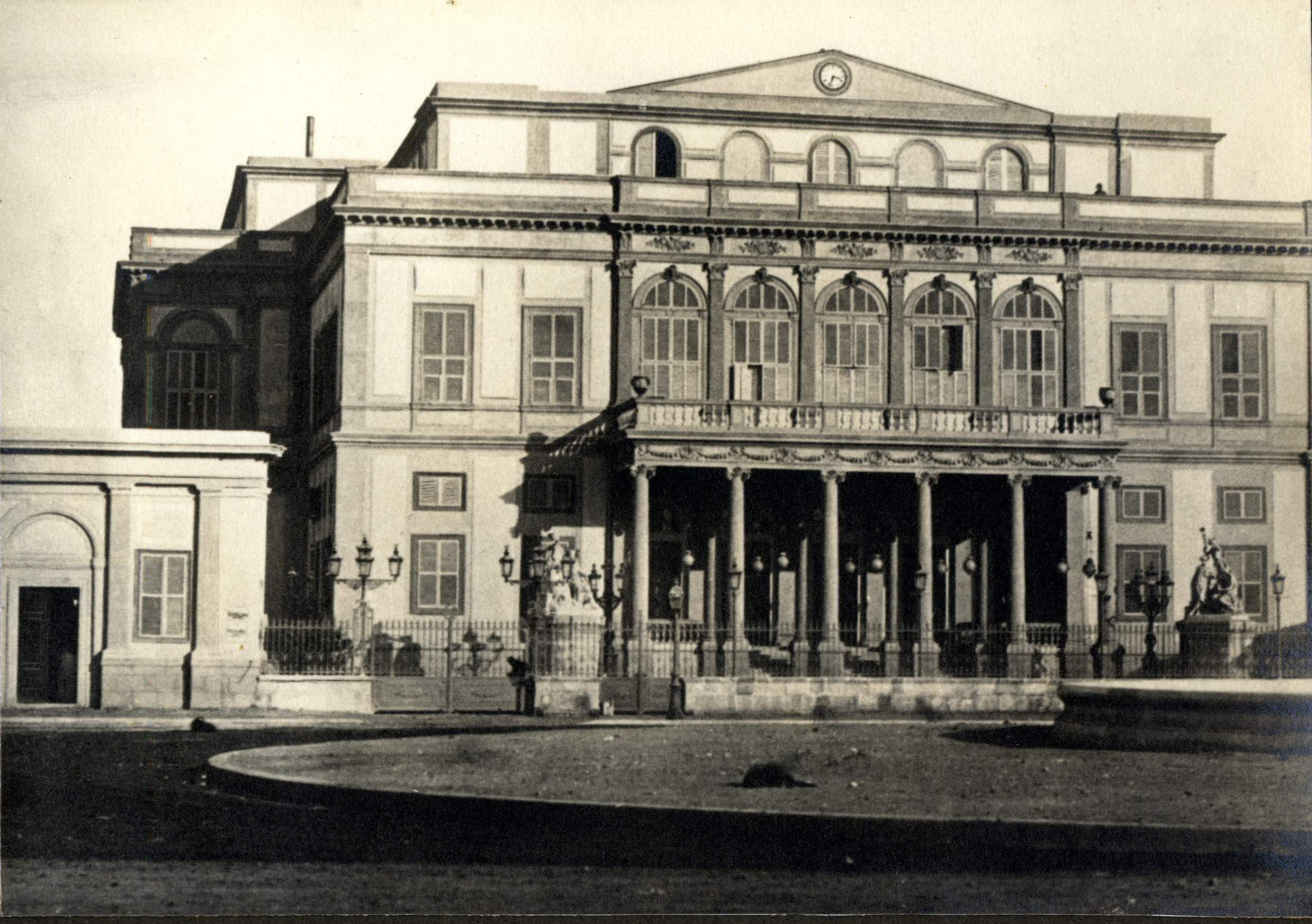
The Khedivial Opera House in 1869

The history of opera in the Arabic-speaking world is generally viewed to have started from the premiere of Verdi's Aida in Cairo at the Khedivial Opera House in 1871, though Verdi's opera was sung in Italian.

== Western operas sung in Arabic ==
Ratiba El-Hefny sang the title role in Cairo in Lehár's The Merry Widow in Arabic in 1961. This was followed by Verdi's La traviata in Arabic in 1964 and Gluck's Orfeo ed Euridice in 1970. This era ended with the 1971 fire at the Khedivial Opera House.

On March 6, 2008, at the 8th Al-Ain Classical Music Festival at Al Ain in the United Arab Emirates, Polish opera director Ryszard Peryt directed Egyptian musicologist Aly Sadek's translation of Mozart's Don Giovanni, as performed by soloists, the choir of the Université Antonine, Baabda, Lebanon, and the Warsaw Philharmonic's Chamber Orchestra, conducted by Zbigniew Graca. The project planned to present other Mozart opera in the Arabic language, e.g. The Marriage of Figaro and The Magic Flute and record on the Opera in Arabic label.

== Original compositions in Arabic ==
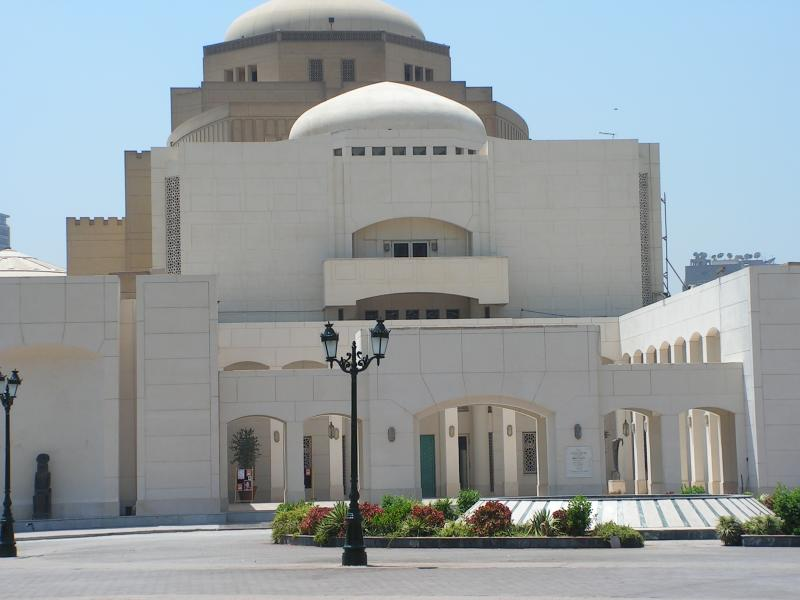
The new Cairo Opera House, at the National Cultural Centre, Zamalek district

The first opera in Arabic may be that of the Lebanese composer Wadia Sabra, whose opera The Two Kings to a libretto by Father Marun Ghusn, was premiered in Beirut in 1927. Since then, the opera's score was thought to be lost until Lebanese Baritone Singer Fady Jeanbert discovered the piece while doing research on the composer at the Lebanese Musical Heritage Center in 2022. Les Deux Rois Original Score

Egyptian composer Aziz El-Shawan's Antar (1948, based on the life of Antarah ibn Shaddad) and Anas el-Wugood (1970) are on historical themes as are his countrymen Sayed Awad's The Death of Cleopatra, based on the epic poem by Ahmed Shawqi, and Kamel El-Remali's opera Hassan El-Basri, based on the life of Hassan El-Basri.

Modern Egyptian composer, conductor and Director of Damanhour Opera House in Cairo, Sherif Mohie El Din, has written a couple of operas. Miramar first opened in Cairo in 2005, with libretto by renowned poet Sayed Hegab after Naguib Mahfouz's novel of the same name.

Dutch composer Michiel Borstlap was commissioned by the Emir of Qatar to write the opera Ibn Sina, based on the life of Avicenna, performed in Qatar in 2003.

Dream She Is, an Arabic opera monodrama for woman's voice (sung by Fadia Tomb El Hage), has been composed in 2008 by Joelle Khoury, a Lebanese composer. First played in Beirut by the Belgian chamber orchestra "Fragments ensemble", it was also performed May 4, 2012, at Esterházy Palace, Eisenstadt, Austria, by Kremerata Baltica (founded by Gidon Kremer in 1997) and in Switzerland, by TaG ensemble.

Among composers of art song in Arabic, Hiba Al Kawas has not composed a full opera in Arabic, but her cycle of five instrumental and three song pieces Rou'ia Fi Maa received its première at the Opéra Bastille in Paris in 2007.

In July 2009, Daniel Barenboim's Youth Orchestra in Ramallah produced the opera The Sultana of Cadiz (later renamed to Die arabische Prinzessin), based on a pasticcio of music by Juan Crisóstomo Arriaga to a new libretto by Paula Fünfeck after an Arabic fairy tale at Ramallah's Cultural Palace. The opera was commissioned and conducted by Anne-Sophie Brüning of the Barenboim-Said Foundation.

Lebanese composer Iyad Kanaan (1971) composed an opera in three acts entitled Qadmus to an Arabic libretto by Said Akl.

In 2024, Zarqa Al Yamama, the first grand opera to be produced in Saudi Arabia, premiered in Riyadh. The libretto was written in Arabic by the Saudi poet Saleh Zamanan, while the music is by the Australian composer Lee Bradshaw.

== Opera houses and venues ==
The new Cairo Opera House (1988), Damascus Opera House (2004), Dubai Opera (2016), and the Qatar Opera House are multipurpose arts venues. In April 2010, Reuters reported that China will spend $40 million to build a 1,400-seat opera house in Algiers.
