= Kamel El-Remali =

Egyptian composer

Kamel Al Rimali (born 1922)- (2011) was an Egyptian classical composer. His opera in Arabic Hasan Al-Basri (Arabic: الحسن البصري) is based on the life of Hasan of Basra.
