= Syrian National Orchestra for Arabic Music =

Syrian orchestra

The Syrian National Orchestra for Arabic Music was a Syrian orchestra dedicated to the performance of classical Arabic music, as well as experimental work based on traditional music from the Middle East. The orchestra played regular concerts in the Damascus Opera House since its opening in 2004. Due to the ongoing Syrian civil war, most of its members, like its principal conductor and oud virtuoso Issam Rafea, or Moslem Rahal, a notable ney player, have left Syria for exile in Europe, the US or other countries.

== Guest artists with British band Gorillaz and award-winning film score ==
The Syrian National Orchestra for Arabic Music became known internationally for collaborating with British virtual band Gorillaz on their Plastic Beach album track "White Flag". In 2010, the Syrian musicians also played this song live as guest artists on the British band's Escape to Plastic Beach Tour.

In 2016, they were featured in the Gorillaz song "Crashing Down", over the credits of The White Helmets, a documentary film by Orlando von Einsiedel on the Syrian organisation of the same name. The song is an unreleased track from the album Plastic Beach, but the original vocals by Damon Albarn were absent, instead featuring Arabic lyrics. The film later won the Academy Award for Best Documentary (Short Subject) at the 89th Academy Awards.
