= Joelle Khoury =

Jazz and classical musician and composer

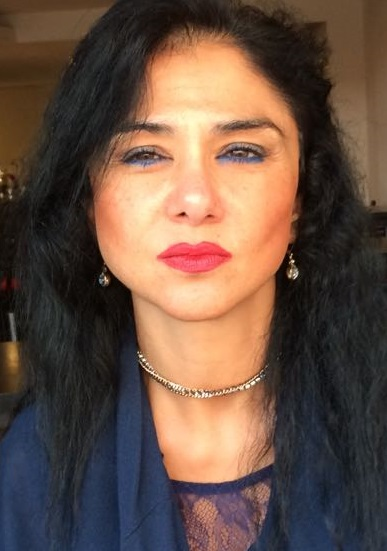

Background information
- Born: Beirut, Lebanon
- Genres: Jazz, Contemporary classical music
- Occupations: Pianist, Composer, Lecturer.
- Years active: 1995–present
- Website: joellek.com/Joelle_content.html

Joelle Khoury is a Lebanese-American pianist and composer of jazz and contemporary classical music.

== Background ==
Born in Beirut, Joelle Khoury left Lebanon for the United States after the beginning of the Lebanese Civil War. She obtained a degree in Economics and Musicology at George Mason University in Virginia. Returning to Lebanon several years later, she received a master's degree in philosophy from Saint Joseph University and a piano diploma from the Lebanese Higher Conservatory of Music.

She has been invited on Extra-muros residencies in France (2002 and 2004), the Czech Republic (2006), Switzerland (2011, through Pro Helvetia) and the United States (2013) as a MacDowell Colony fellow, where she worked on her multimedia performance Palais de femmes.

For almost two decades, she has composed contemporary classical music pieces and concertos for chamber and philharmonic orchestras, as well as pieces for her own jazz quintet. Her idea of composition, not restricted to specific standard styles, eras, geographical spaces or music categories stricto sensu, led her toward contemporary music within complex jazz forms and non-traditional classical music structures. Rather than "orientalizing" her music – as a Lebanese composer – she always thought that, "A true composition is the fruit of a unique idea, developed into a concept, based in what the composer has heard, aiming at expressing an individual point of view, a certain personality. Therefore it is neither 'western' nor 'oriental,' taking into account the fact that we have all heard numerous styles of music." In the same spirit, Khoury says: "I just like music that represents who I am right now, and I use any means I possess to create it. I am mainly a composer. I am as much into contemporary classical music as I am into jazz and electronics."

Her interest in philosophy led her, after years of musical production, to obtain a PhD. Her doctoral thesis on Gilles Deleuze is entitled Théâtralité et Désir de mort créateur chez Gilles Deleuze.

== Notable works ==
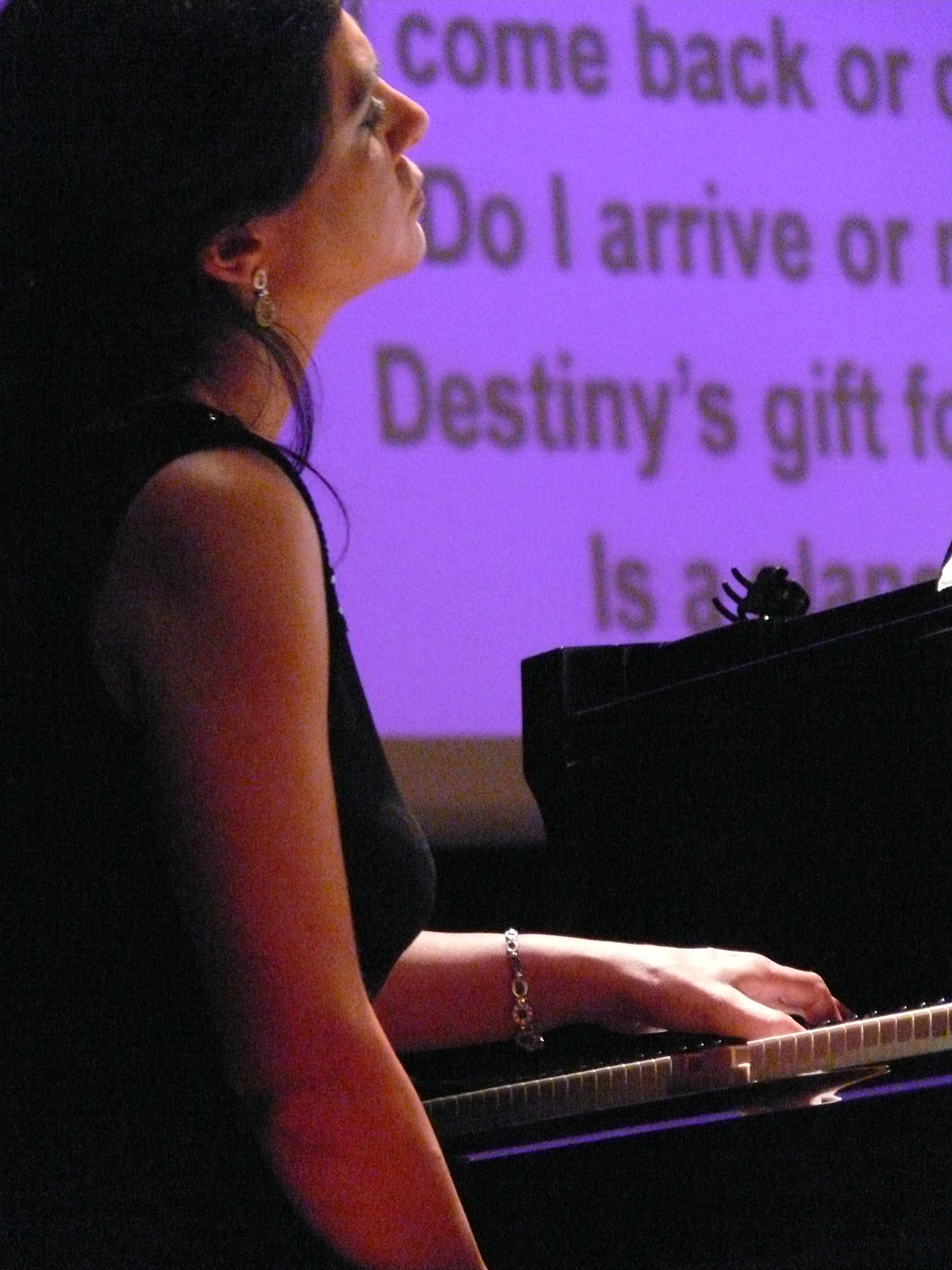
Joelle Khoury in 2008 performing "Dream she is", an opera monodrama for woman's voice

In 1995, Khoury founded In-Version, a jazz quintet performing original compositions that combine a contemporary bebop style with complex counterpoint lines. Songs such as "Circles, Is it so!, Just when you least expect" (from the album Is it so!) are typical examples of how melodies evolve on backing composite lines, which are as fundamental as the melody itself. The same concept is also encountered in some of Khoury's classical contemporary arrangements. They feature very complex and intricate backing lines, though smoothly supporting the simplest melodies. An Arabic opera monodrama for woman's voice (sung by Fadia Tomb El Hage), composed in 2008 and first played in Beirut by the Belgian chamber orchestra Ensemble Fragments, was also performed on May 4, 2012, at Esterházy Palace, Eisenstadt, Austria, by Kremerata Baltica and in Switzerland by the TaG ensemble.

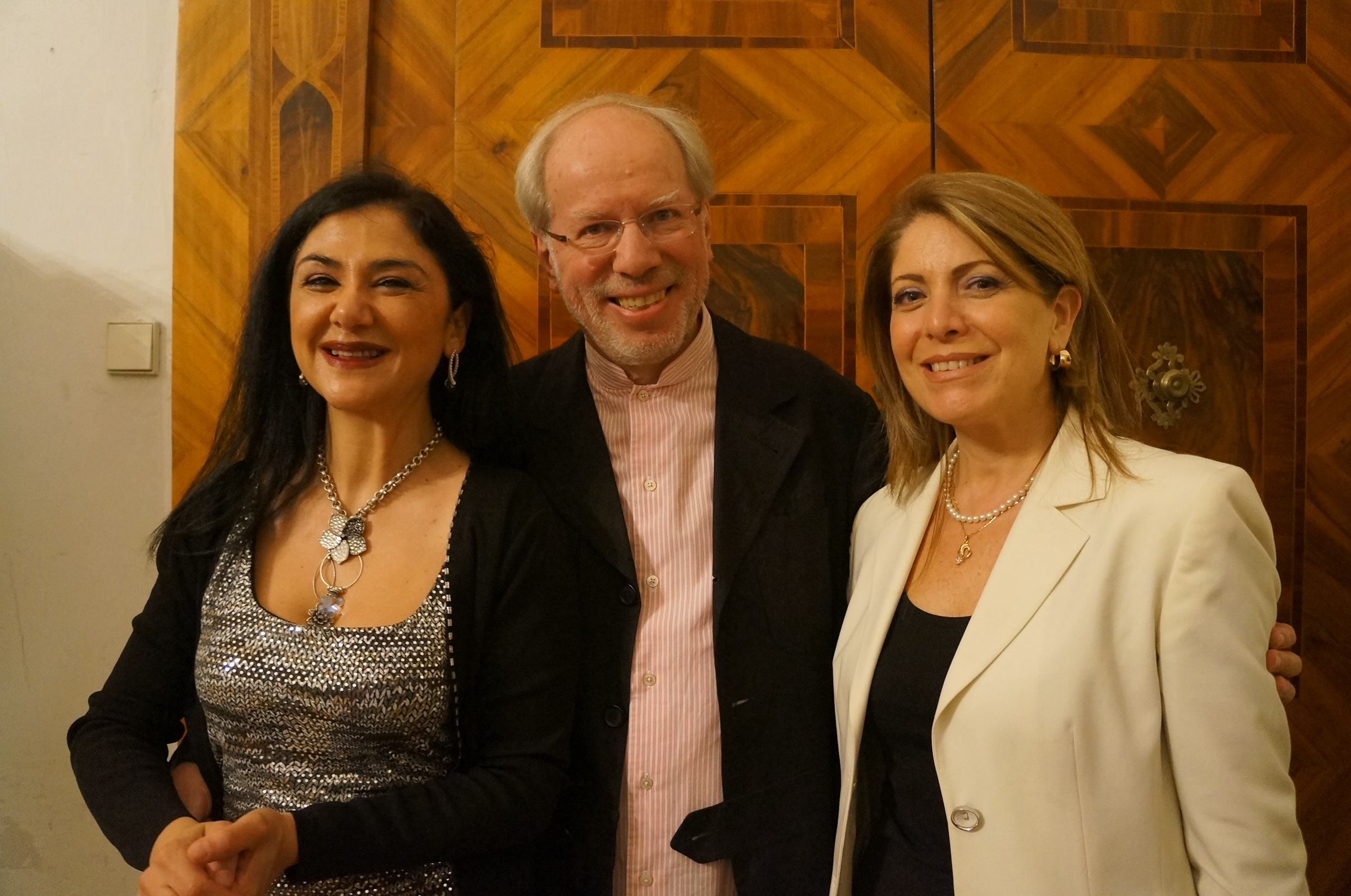
Joelle Khoury and Fadia Tomb el Hage with Gidon Kremer in Austria, Esterházy Palace, 2012.

Her "Variations on Imaginary Folk Dances" for string orchestra and voice rearranged traditional Middle Eastern songs on a contemporary classical music basis. It was commissioned by Kremerata Baltica for their 2012 concert, Arab-Baltic Spring, at Esterházy Palace, Eisenstadt, Austria. The piece was performed again on May 29, 2014, in Fürth and in Würzburg, Germany, by the Kremerata, along with the piece "Of Memories, Folks and I" for string orchestra, percussion and voice. Both pieces, conducted by Andris Veismanis, are based on Middle Eastern folk music, and yet expressed in contemporary style, rendered by the Lebanese alto Fadia Tomb El Hage. The 2014 concert was live-streamed by the Bayerischer Rundfunk. A symphonic version of these two pieces was also performed in May 2013 by the Lebanese National Symphony Orchestra at Saint Joseph University Church, Beirut.

"Morning Star" is a Syriac traditional church song, rearranged for brass quintet and commissioned by the Italian organization Donne in Musica for a Christmas concert (Natale in Musica 2006). Donne in Musica also commissioned "Getting Along," a concerto for two marimbas and string orchestra, performed May 2008 in Bari, Italy.

Multimedia performances include a number of performances and recordings of poems coupled with music (Music and poetry, recorded live in May 2003) or played in contemporary performances, which gather poetry, acting, music and painting. Examples include Senghor, Électroésie, Les poètes témoignent, and Palais de femmes.

== Albums ==
=== Jazz ===
- Tumbling up, In-Version, the Joelle Khoury Quintet. Compositions by J. Khoury, produced by Experimental art concept, 1999.
- Is it so!, In-Version, the Joelle Khoury Quintet. Compositions by J. Khoury, produced by M. & J. Khoury, 2005.
- Beirut Jazz 2020, In-Version, the Joelle Khoury Quintet. Compositions by J. Khoury, sponsored by Arab Fund for Arts and Culture, AFAC, 2020.

=== Classical and opera ===
- Music and poetry, Eleven chamber orchestra and voice pieces, based on German romantic poetry (Goethe, Heine, Novalis, Rilke). Sponsored by the Lebanese National Higher Conservatory of Music and the Goethe Institute, Beirut. J. Khoury, piano and composition; Harout Fazlian, conductor. Recorded live on May 14, 2003, at Pierre Abou-Khater auditorium, Saint Joseph University, Beirut, Lebanon. Produced by La CD-Thèque & Joelle Khoury.
- Dream she is, Arabic opera monodrama for woman's voice, composed for Fadia Tomb El-Hage. Work for Alto, five soloists, and electronics. Text excerpts from Jacques Aswad's poetry. Alto: Fadia Tomb El-Hage; Conductor: Harout Fazlian. Recorded live in Beirut and performed by Fragments ensemble, a Belgium chamber Music ensemble. Produced by Eka3 (www.eka3productions.com). Commissioned by the non-profit organization Quart de Ton a.s.b.l. Also performed in Austria by Kremerata Baltica, and in Switzerland by TaG ensemble.

== Tracks in Albums ==
- Arabian Fantasy In Blue, Piece for flute, cello, and piano. Commissioned by the Meinenger Trio and the German radio Bayerischer Rundfunk, 2013 .
- Anta al Waheed (The one and only), Polyphonic piece based on poetry by Al Hallaj, mixing contemporary style with a vague flavor of oriental music, 2013.
- Vers le Soleil Bleu, Masarat, Fadia Tomb El Hage sings Lebanese Authors and Composers, with Fragments Ensemble, Orlando Records, 2020.
- Zarqa'a A Shamsu, Masarat, Fadia Tomb El Hage sings Lebanese Authors and Composers, with Fragments Ensemble, Orlando Records, 2020.

== Other recordings and performances ==
Sleep, Text by James Joyce for choir, organ and timpani. Recorded live, this composition has been commissioned by the American University of Beirut Choral Society for the Living Lebanese composer's concert, which took place in 2004, Assembly Hall, American University of Beirut.
Soliloquy, a symphonic composition in three movements, written for the Lebanese National Symphony Orchestra and performed in May 2005, at Saint Joseph Church, Beirut. Conductor: Harout Fazlian.
Aaah!..., Text excerpts from Virginia Woolf's Between the Acts. This composition is dedicated to John Cage and was recorded live in 2006 in an open form composition concert at P. Abou Khater theatre, Saint Joseph University, Beirut. Sponsored by the Lebanese National Conservatory and the Fulbright Program, with Katharine Cartwright (vocals). Conductor: Harout Fazlian.
Alone Together 2, For qanun, cello and violin. This piece was commissioned by the Bayerischer Rundfunk and recorded in Nuremberg, April 2011.

Moods Rhythms and Changes, for 3 percussionists, cello and piano. Commissioned by Symblema Percussion, Paris, 2011.

Ala Dal'ona, A Middle Eastern folk song (four hands piano), performed in 2011 by Mimi Melkonian and Howard Aibel at Convent of the Sacred Heart (Connecticut), Greenwich, USA, and in 2017 at Brunswick School, Greenwich (Connecticut) within a concert entitled An Evening with Lebanese Composers.
Just Hold Me Tight, Solo violin by George Yammine. A piece mixing oriental scales and contemporary atonal music and recorded in December 2012, Beirut, Lebanon.

Tidbits, Series of short variations on an elusive theme by the viola, in its own turn inspired by a Middle Eastern chant, 2018.

== Articles and books ==
Khoury has also published articles, including:

- "Times Goes One Way - Against the Classification of Arts".
- "Die Geschichte - Ein göttliches Gedicht" ("History, a divine poem"), associating Bach's compositional style to Leibniz's Monadology.
- "The Body Without Organs... said the Eye to the Ear: Deleuzian thematics in Sophocles, Mann, Beckett and Süskind".
- Beyrouth va et vient; Ceci n'est pas un journal. Oser dire éditions. Bruxelles - Beyrouth, 2025

== See also ==
- Women in jazz
- Women in music
