= Higher Institute of Music in Damascus =

Music school in Damascus, Syria

Coordinates: 33°30′44″N 36°16′44″E

The Higher Institute of Music in Damascus (HIM) (Arabic: المعهد العالى للموسيقى) is the national music academy in Syria.

== History ==
The HIM was founded in 1962 by music educator and conductor Solhi al-Wadi as the Arab Institute of Music and was established in its current form as a conservatory in 1990 by presidential decree. The aim of the institute is to prepare upcoming generations of musicians to perform both Arabic and international music.

The institute trains students in various Arabic and western musical instruments. It also teaches the principles of individual, collective, Arabic and international vocal music performance. Further, it offers courses for future composers and band leaders and prepares researchers in musicology, especially to study Arabic music. The institute has trained students for musical ensembles with string, wind and percussion instruments, for the Syrian National Symphony Orchestra, Arabic music choirs and orchestra, as well as for opera singing. In 2004, musicians Kinan Azmeh, Dima Orsho, Issam Rafea and other former graduates of the HIM formed the jazz fusion band Hewar.

Further, the HIM regularly participates in musical activities both in Damascus and in other cities in Syria. The HIM is housed in the same building complex as the Higher Institute of Dramatic Arts and located next to the Damascus Opera House on Umayyad Square.

Several of the institute's graduates have moved abroad, often for further training or engagements at music venues, but also fleeing the Civil War in Syria since 2011. Before this and since its beginnings, the institute had employed several Russian teachers seconded by the Soviet Union. Among them was Victor Babenko, choir conductor and the leading author of a musical dictionary and harmony textbook for Syrian music.

Professional musicians from Syria have performed at concerts in the Middle East, the U.S. and notably in Europe, such as the Morgenland Festival Osnabrück in Germany.

== Notable staff and graduates ==
Faculty

- Athil Hamdan, chellist and second director after al-Wadi
- Lubana al Quntar, soprano singer, former Head of the Opera Department at the Higher Institute of Music in Damascus (2003–11)
- Issam Rafea, former Head of the Arabic Music Department, oud player and composer, based in the U.S.
- Gaswan Zerikly, professor for piano
- Moslem Rahal, graduate and former professor of ney

Graduates

- Dima Orsho, mezzosoprano singer and composer
- Kinan Azmeh, clarinetist and composer
- Lena Chamamyan, soprano singer and songwriter
- Maias Alyamani, violinist and composer
- Hassan Taha, oud and horn player
- Basel Rajoub, saxophone player
- Rasha Rizk, singer
- Shafi Badreddine, oud player and composer
- Mohannad Nasser, oud player and composer
- Dania Tabbaa, pianist
- Waed Bouhassoun, singer and oud player
- Lynn Adib, singer-songwriter

== See also ==
- Music of Syria
- Hewar
