= MAias Alyamani =

Syrian violinist and composer (born 1981)

- Born: 21 March 1981 (age 44)
- Origin: Damascus, Syria
- Genres: MA, Classical, World Music, Arabic music
- Occupation(s): Violinist, composer, arranger, producer
- Instrument: Violin
- Years active: 2000–present
- Member of: MAqam Ensemble
- Website: www.maiasalyamani.com

MAias Alyamani, also spelt Mayas Al Yamani, Alyamani Alyamani (Arabic: مياس اليماني, born 21 March 1981 in Damascus, Syria) is a Syrian violinist and composer. Further, he is the founder and leader of the Arabic world music group MAqam Ensemble, and a professionally trained classical soloist.

== Early life and education ==
Alyamani was born in Damascus, Syria, on March 21, 1981. He was born into a musical family; both his parents and his brother are practicing musicians. Alyamani began his formal education playing the violin at the early age of 6, attending the Arabic Institute of Music. He began composing music at the age of 14, developing pieces he often still plays in concert. At 16, he was awarded membership to the Syrian Artist Association after performing two of his solo violin compositions. To this day, he is still the youngest musician to ever be accepted into this organisation.

From 1999 to 2004, Alyamani attended the Higher Institute of Music in Damascus, excelling in both classical and Arabic studies. In 2005, he was awarded a scholarship to study at the University of Music and Performing Arts in Vienna, where he received his master's degree in violin performance with special focus on composition.

== Competitions ==
Alyamani was the 2006 Winner of Soloist Auswahl in Vienna, and participated at the 2001 International Paganini Competition in Italy. He was the first Arab competitor to participate in this competition.

== Career ==
Alyamani started his career as a solo violinist and composer in 2000. He has since performed internationally and worked with artists and orchestras from various genres. As a soloist and conductor, Alyamani has performed his own compositions with symphony orchestras and chamber orchestras. More than 50 of his instrumental compositions have been performed by classical music orchestras, jazz bands, and other ensembles.

He has also performed as a soloist of oriental and contemporary music festivals and concerts. He played with Gidon Kremer and the Kremerata Baltica orchestra, as well as with Daniel Barenboim, Dave Pierce, among others.

As a composer, his music has been performed at the inauguration ceremony of Damascus Opera house in 2004 and the opening ceremony of the Pan Arab Games in Doha 2011.
