= Gaswan Zerikly =

Syrian pianist and composer (born 1954)

Gaswan Zerikly (Arabic: غزوان الزركلي; born 4 January 1954 in Damascus) is a Syrian pianist and composer.

Gaswan Zerikly is an internationally recognised pianist, having played in twenty-five countries, including the US and numerous cities in Europe, Africa and Asia. He has performed as solo pianist and composer for the Syrian Radio and Television since 1977 and has composed music for TV, film and others, as well as contributing to the western-style art song in Arabic. Among other composers, he has performed music by Franz Liszt at the Damascus Opera.

Zerikly has been a professor at the Damascus Higher Institute of Music (2001-) and the Cairo Conservatory (2003–2005).

== Studies ==
- 1961-1972 Formal Classical Training with the English teacher Cynthia Everett Al-Wadi and Russian teachers Oleg Ivanov and Viktor Bunin in the Conservatory of Music in Damascus.
- 1972-1977 Diploma With Prof. K. Bassler and Prof. D. Muller-Nilsson. Master “Meisterklasse” with Dieter Zechlin from the German Academy of Music “Hanns Eisler” in Berlin.
- 1977-1981 Ph.D. In Piano Teaching “Facultas Docendi” with Gleb Axelrod, Artist's Award of Russia from the Tchaikovsky Conservatory in Moscow.

== International Awards ==
- 1979 Diploma of the International Piano Competition “Vianna da Motta”. Portugal.
- 1980 Special Prize of the International Piano Competition “Paloma O’Shea”. Spain.
- 1986 Diploma of the Tchaikovsky Competition. Russia.
- 1989-90 Scholarship Preparation Courses for Professorship at the Tchaikovsky Conservatory in Moscow. Russia.
- 1991 Scholarship of the German Academy Exchange. Germany.
- 1994 Third Prize & Special Prize of the International Piano Competition “Ibla”. Italy.
- 2007 Medal of Algier (UNESCO Arab Capital of Culture 2007)

== Writer and translator ==
- Translation of the "Aesthetics of Music" by Eduard Hanslick ("الجميل في فن النغم")
- Translation of the world bestseller "Why Men Don't Listen & Women Can't Read Maps" by Allan and Barbara Pease" ("معارك قيس و ليلى")
- Translation of the "Nights in the Gardens of Spain" by Witi Ihimaera ("ليالٍ في حدائق إســبانيا")

== Discography ==
- Arabic lieder compositions by Zerikly, performed by soprano Dima Orsho, accompanied by the composer on piano. Published by Incognito, Damascus 2008. The booklet contains the full Arabic sung texts and performer biographies in Arabic.
