= Asma Fayoumi =

Syrian painter

Asma Fayoumi (born 1943, Amman, Jordan) is a Syrian Abstract Expressionist painter. She attended Damascus University in Syria. Her work is in the collection of the Barjeel Art Foundation.

In 2011 and 2015 she had a solo shows at the Ayyam Gallery in Beirut. In 2020 through 2022 her work was included in the exhibition Taking Shape: Abstraction from the Arab World, 1950s–1980s which traveled from the Grey Art Gallery at New York University to the Block Museum of Art at Northwestern University. In 2023 her work was included in the exhibition Action, Gesture, Paint: Women Artists and Global Abstraction 1940-1970 at the Whitechapel Gallery in London.

Fayoumi's son is the composer Zaid Jabri.
