= Julia Messenger =

- Origin: Australia
- Genres: Electronica, chillout, jazz.
- Instrument: Singer
- Years active: 1997 to present
- Labels: Threespace, Rainhorse Records, Groove Attack Productions, EMI, Capitol, Universal Records
- Website: http://www.juliamessenger.com

Julia Messenger is an Australian singer-songwriter and producer best known for her work in the electronica, chill-out and jazz genres. She has performed, recorded and collaborated with Klaus Schulze, Henning Schmitz, Ferry Corsten, Klaus Waldeck, Manfred Leuchter and Scott Rockenfield.

== Career ==
Messenger has released three albums, with songs from those albums appearing on several compilation albums, including Pure Chill Out (2002) which debuted at No. 19 on the U.S. Billboard Top Electronic Albums Chart.

Messenger's songs have also had television placements in ABC's Miss South Sudan, Miss Australia, Bad Girls Club, and Thomas Banks: Quest for Love.

In 2006 The New York Times’ listed Messengers' song “Look Up, Look Down” as being included on the Top 5 playlists of songs heard in U.S. Restaurants.

Messenger has performed at Australian venues including: Bennetts Lane Jazz Club, Melbourne Recital Centre, Montsalvat, Paris Cat Jazz Club, The Vanguard and The Basement.

Messenger has performed at the Edinburgh Fringe Festival, Alexis Bistro Ampang in Malaysia, Burg Wilhelmstein with Manfred Leuchter, and on the Midnight Sun Train across Finland with Iiro Rantala.

Messenger has performed as a session singer for artists Manfred Leuchter and Geoff Kluke and the Changes.

As a producer, Messenger remixed Australian band, Not Drowning, Waving’s song “Palau” for the Sonic Maps EP.

Messenger's works “Myamisumi,” “Glitter” “Lover Come Back” and “Stripped” have been remixed by producers Razoof, Rubbasol, Salz, Mod X, Charly H. Fox, Raubrec Team, Chris B, Peter Haze, and The Icons South Beach.

Ferry Corsten released a remix album of Twice in a Blue Moon, including the track co-written by Messenger, Black Velvet which was remixed by DJ Mind & Jerry Ropero.

German electronic music magazine, GROOVE has written about and reviewed Salz's remix of Messenger's “Myamisumi” and “Lover Come Back” as well as her collaborations with Whirlpool Productions and Marcus Worgull. Groove commented that “Julia sings into your heart and mine, truthfully so lovingly it rivals that of singer Nicolette.”

Sue Wilson of The Scotsman has written of Messenger's vocal talent: "…through the full spectrum, from fragile candied sweetness to a scorching soul-diva holler – echos of Mouth Music, Annie Lennox, Horse, Sinéad O'Connor…".

Messenger is featured and interviewed in the book "A Singers Companion: Personal Wisdom from the Global Music Industry" by Australian singer Christine Sullivan and Monika Roleff, sharing experiences and guidance as an international musician.

=== Collaborations ===
As vocalist and composer, Messenger has collaborated on many works with Klaus Schulze, a German composer and musician. The significance of her collaborations with Schulze are widely acknowledged and referenced in reviews internationally.

Klaus Schulze released limited box set editions of non-album material, of which Messenger collaborated on Contemporary Works I as a composer and featured vocalist, and Contemporary Works II as a featured vocalist.

| Work | CD | Title | Role/s |
|---|---|---|---|
| Contemporary Works I | CD #2: The Crime of Suspense | Good Old 4 on the Floor | Composer, Vocalist |
| Contemporary Works I | CD #2: The Crime of Suspense | Overchill | Composer, Vocalist |
| Contemporary Works I | CD #8: Ballett 3 | My Ty She | Composer, Vocalist |
| Contemporary Works I | CD #10: Adds & Edits | Vox ‘N’ Harmony | Composer, Vocalist |
| Contemporary Works II | CD #1: Virtual Outback | | Vocalist |
| Contemporary Works II | CD #2: Timbres of Ice | | Vocalist |
| Contemporary Works II | CD #3: Another Green Mile | | Vocalist |
| Contemporary Works II | CD #4: Androgyn | | Vocalist |
| Contemporary Works II | CD #5: Cocooning | | Vocalist |

Greg Allen's book, “Klaus Schulze, Electronic Music Legend,” features Messenger as a collaborator of Schulze, writing about her compositions and performances as well as interviewing her regarding “The Crime of Suspense” of which she co-wrote two compositions and was featured as a vocalist. Allen comments on her performance of "Overchill" stating, "Julia Messenger and Thomas and Kagermann are both very creative and spirited musicians... adding a stunning new dimension to Klaus’s music." In writing about the title "My Ty She" Allen states, "The combination of your (Thomas Kagermann) ethereal vocals with Julia‘s makes it an extraordinary work."

Messenger's collaborations with Schulze's from Contemporary Works I and Contemporary Works II were re-released as independent albums under different record labels.

| Year | Album | Labels |
|---|---|---|
| 2006 | The Crime of Suspense | Revisted Records (SPV GmbH) |
| 2007 | Ballett 3 | Revisted Records (SPV GmbH) |
| 2008 | Virtual Outback | Revisted Records (SPV GmbH) |
| 2016 | Another Green Mile | MIG Music |
| 2017 | Androgyn | MIG Music |
| 2018 | Cocooning | MIG Music |
| 2019 | Timbres of Ice | MIG Music |

Messenger also collaborated as a composer of “KS/Jay M.D” from Essential Edits Promo (2000) and performed as a vocalist on Shadowlands (2013), alongside Lisa Gerrard and Crysta Bell.

== Awards ==
In 2003, Messenger's songs “Do I Know You” and “Fresh On The Edge” were finalists in the Dance/Electronica category of the Australian Songwriters Association National Songwriting Contest. “Fresh On The Edge” was further recognised in the Top 10 finalists for the category.

In 2007, Messenger was a semi-finalist of the International Songwriting Competition in the AAA (Adult Album Alternative) category for "And We Danced” and in the Performance category for "So Complicated.” In 2016, Messenger was a finalist in EDM (Electronic Dance Music) category with her song “Stripped,” which was later awarded an Honourable Mention.

== Artist discography ==
| Year | Album | Label |
|---|---|---|
| 2003 | Julia Messenger | Water Music Records/ UMRG |
| 2010 | Productions & Collaborations | Skip Sister Records |
| 2011 | Live At Bennetts Lane | Skip Sister Records |

== Songwriting discography ==
Messenger has had multiple cuts with artists Whirlpool Productions and Ferry Corsten, regularly performing as a vocalist on the recordings and being credited as a featured artist.

| Year | Album | Label | Artist | Song |
|---|---|---|---|---|
| 2018 | Lost | Cascade Records | Darwin | Glitter feat. Julia Messenger |
| 2013 | Goodbye Lover | Detail Recordings | LYNX and Hellrazor | Goodbye Lover |
| 2008 | Twice in a Blue Moon | Flashover | Ferry Corsten | Black Velvet feat. Julia Messenger |
| 2008 | This is Not Jazz | Ice And Spice Records | Mod X | Glitter feat. Julia Messenger |
| 2007 | Ice | Moodfood Records | Moodfood | Pain feat. Julia Messenger |
| 2007 | Ice | Moodfood Records | Moodfood | For the Love of You |
| 2007 | Ice | Moodfood Records | Moodfood | Butterflies |
| 2007 | Something To Say | Moonray Records | PFL (Pre Fade Listening) | When You Love |
| 2007 | Something To Say | Moonray Records | PFL (Pre Fade Listening) | Rise and Fall |
| 2007 | Something To Say | Moonray Records | PFL (Pre Fade Listening) | Something To Say |
| 2007 | Something To Say | Moonray Records | PFL (Pre Fade Listening) | Planet |
| 2007 | Something To Say | Moonray Records | PFL (Pre Fade Listening) | Cool For Cats |
| 2006 | Every Heart Is A Revolutionary Cell | SPV Recordings | Fury In The Slaughterhouse | Where You Fly |
| 2003 | Has It Come to This? | Water Music Records | ORG Lounge | Butterflies – Org Lounge remix |
| 2003 | Blue Dubsessions | Elektrolux | PFL (Pre Fade Listening) | For the Love of You feat. Julia Messenger |
| 2003 | Blue Dubsessions | Elektrolux | PFL (Pre Fade Listening) | Bird on a Wire feat. Julia Messenger |
| 2003 | Blue Dubsessions | Elektrolux | PFL (Pre Fade Listening) | Set in Stone feat. Pickadelic & Julia Messenger |
| 2002 | Lover Come Back | Salz | Salz | Lover Come Back feat. Julia Messenger |
| 2001 | Ole EP | Spectrum Works | Marcus Worgull | Havin’ a Dig feat. Julia Messenger |
| 2001 | Kyrios | In-akustik | Thomas Kagermann | Bathing in Salt Water |
| 2000 | Lifechange | Warner Elektra Atlantic | Whirlpool Productions | A Game to Play |

== Selected Compilation discography ==
Messenger's songs have been included on many compilation albums released under U.S. and European labels.

Her song "For the Love of You" released with PFL also appeared on a compilation DVD entitled, Flowmotion (Visual Pleasure Volume 3.0) released by General Electric Music.

| Year | Compilation Album | Label | Artist/Song | Role/s |
|---|---|---|---|---|
| 2020 | Isolation (New Collaborative Electronic Music) | ZyXyZ Music | Julia Messenger with Mark Jenkins - The Lightning in Her Eyes | Artist, Co-writer |
| 2018 | Clubbers Culture: Sunday Chill Out Selection | Clubbers Culture | Julia Messenger – I Gave You My Heart | Artist, Co-writer |
| 2016 | The Best of House On The Beach - 30 Sexy Chillout Tunes | Time Tools | Julia Messenger – Give This Up | Artist, Co-writer |
| 2016 | The Best of House On The Beach - 30 Sexy Chillout Tunes | Time Tools | Senso feat. Julia Messenger – Love With A Time Limit (First Love) | Featured Artist, Co-writer |
| 2016 | The Best of House On The Beach - 30 Sexy Chillout Tunes | Time Tools | Julia Messenger – I Gave You My Heart | Artist, Co-writer |
| 2015 | Sunset Chill Out Lounge Vol. 5 | Time Tools | Julia Messenger – You're My Wonderland | Artist, Co-writer with PFL (Felix Wolter) and Peter LaSalle |
| 2015 | Sunset Chill Out Lounge Vol. 5 | Time Tools | Julia Messenger – Is It Me Is It You | Artist, Co-writer with PFL (Felix Wolter) and Wolter LaSalle |
| 2014 | Alpine Grooves Vol. 3 | Musicpark Records | Senso feat. Julia Messenger – Love With A Time Limit (First Love) | Featured Artist, Co-writer Note: Peaked at No. 16 on the Apple Music Top 100 Electronic Charts in Vietnam. |
| 2011 | Ritmo de la Playa - 20 finest latin house tunes | Time Tools | Julia Messenger – Give This Up | Featured Artist, Co-writer |
| 2010 | Lingerie Lounge - 30 Top Chillout Tunes | Time Tools | PFL feat. Julia Messenger – For the Love of You | Featured Artist, Co-writer with PFL (Felix Wolter) |
| 2006 | Hotel Chill | Water Music Records/ UMRG | Julia Messenger – Telepathy | Artist/Writer |
| 2005 | The Future is My Melody, Vol 2 | Elektrolux | PFL with Julia Messenger – Bird On A Wire | Featured Artist, Co-writer with PFL (Felix Wolter) |
| 2004 | Melbourne – The Sex, The City, The Music | Petrol | Julia Messenger – Look Up Look Down | Artist, Co-writer with Thorsten Vogel and Henning Schmitz |
| 2004 | Spectrum Work - Evolution In Standard | Nebula | Marcus Worgull – Havin' a Dig | Singer, Co-writer with Marcus Worgull |
| 2003 | Dinner at Eight | Water Music Records | Julia Messenger – Telepathy | Artist/Writer |
| 2003 | The Future is My Melody, Vol 1 | Elektrolux | PFL feat. Julia Messenger – For the Love of You | Featured Artist, Co-writer with PFL (Felix Wolter) |
| 2002 | Pure Chill Out | Water Music Records/ UMRG | Julia Messenger – I Miss You | Artist/Writer Note:Debuted at No. 19 on Billboard Top Electronic Albums Chart |
| 2002 | Chilled Sirens | Water Music Records/ UMRG | Julia Messenger – I Miss You | Artist/Writer |
| 2002 | Sub Zero (The Essential Chill Out Collection) | Water Music Records | PFL feat. Julia Messenger – For the Love of You | Featured Artist, Co-writer with PFL (Felix Wolter) |
| 2002 | Sub Zero (The Essential Chill Out Collection) | Water Music Records | Julia Messenger vs Rubbasol – Myami Sumi Version | Featured Artist/Writer |
| 2002 | Ambient Lounge, Vol. 3 | Globe | PFL feat. Julia Messenger – For the Love of You | Featured Artist, Co-writer with PFL (Felix Wolter) |
| 2001 | Coffeeshop Vol. 4 | Edel Records | PFL feat. Julia Messenger – For the Love of You | Featured Artist, Co-writer with PFL (Felix Wolter) |
