= Sanaz (singer) =

German-Iranian musician and poetess, born 1980

Sanaz ساناز زارع ثانی
- Born: 1980 (age 45–46); Sarab, Iran
- Genre: World music
- Occupations: Singer and poetess
- Instrument: Vocals
- Years active: 2010–present
- Website: www.sanazzaresani.com

Sanaz Zaresani (Persian: ساناز زارع ثانی, born 1980) is a German–Iranian musician and poetess. She is known both for her poems in Persian language and for her performances of traditional music from Iran and other Near Eastern musical traditions.

== Life and career ==
Zaresani was born in 1980 in Sarab, a small city in the Iranian region of Azerbaijan. She grew up with the Azerbaijani language and culture, which differ from the Persian language and culture. (Note: Azerbaijani is part of the Turkic languages, and Persian of the Indo-European languages.) Starting in 1997 she studied journalism at the University of Tehran and lived in this city until 2008. After that, she left the Islamic Republic of Iran and moved to Turkey. After two years in Istanbul, she travelled on to Germany, where she first lived in Munich and later in Aachen, where she has lived ever since. Talking about her life and musical journey, she was invited in October 2024 for a TEDx Talk at the University of Aachen.

=== Poetic works ===
Zaresani has published her poems both in Persian original versions and in German translation. Hossein Mansouri, a Munich-based poet and adopted son of the Iranian poetess Forugh Farrokhzad, translated Zarazani's volume of poetry titled Die Geschicklichkeit begrenzter Buchstaben in German (The Skill of Limited Letters) from Persian into German. This collection was named "a significant literary product of the Farsi-speaking expatriate community in Germany" in the yearly report on world literature Britannica Book of the Year 2011. Together with Mansouri, Zaresani presented these poems in 2010 in a bilingual public reading at the Concordia Theater in Bremen and at the Munich Club Voltaire. This performance was commented as follows:

[Zaresani] figures among that post-revolutionary generation, commonly referred to as the ‘Generation of the Burned’, and in the tradition of the legendary Iranian poet and filmmaker Forough Farrokhzad, who is considered a role model by many creative Iranian women. In her poems, she questions those social values that want to force upon the Iranian woman absolute obedience to men.

— Club Voltaire Munich

=== Musician ===
Zaresani's musical collaboration with various artists has been described as a bridge between the home of her childhood and youth in Iran and her new home in Germany. Her performances have been seen as a protest against the ruling laws in Iran, where women have been banned from appearing in public as singers. In addition to concerts in Germany, Zaresani and her accompanying musicians have performed in Brussels and in the German-speaking part of East Belgium.

As a singer, Zaresani performs under the stage name Sanaz in various formations. In their duo, the multi-instrumentalist and composer Benjamin Stein has accompanied her on string instruments of classical Iranian music, such as the santur and the tar, but also occasionally on the oud or the Western acoustic guitar. In 2017, Sanaz made a guest appearance at concerts in Germany and Belgium with the ethno-jazz band Mah-e Manouche, which was awarded a prize by the culture department of the city of Wuppertal.

In December 2022 she released her album Ancient, singing her own lyrics and several other poetic ones in Persian, Azerbaijani, Turkish and Armenian. The accompanying musicians of this band called Sanaz & Friends were German musicians Benjamin Stein (Santur, Tar, Oud, Guitar), Steffen Thormählen (percussion), Uwe Böttcher (double bass, violin), Manfred Leuchter (accordion), and Mohamed Najem (clarinet) from Palestine and the Scottish guitarist Ian Melrose.

== Works ==
Poems

- Silhouette. Poems, Persian and German. Aachen 2019, ISBN 978-3-00-060333-4
- Die Geschicklichkeit begrenzter Buchstaben. Poems. Translated from the Persian by Hossein Mansouri. Sujet Verlag, Bremen 2010, ISBN 978-3-933995-52-0

Music albums

- Asunaz, Sanaz Zaresani, Sasan Azodi, Der Gesang der Zeit, 2012
- Ancient, TimeZone Records, 2022
