= Musica Alta Ripa =

Musical ensemble from Hanover, Germany

- Origin: Hanover, Germany
- Genres: Baroque
- Years active: 1984–present
- Label: MDG
- Members: Danya Segal; Anne Röhrig; Ulla Bundies; Albert Brüggen; Bernward Lohr
- Website: www.musica-alta-ripa.de

Musica Alta Ripa is a musical ensemble from Hanover, specializing in Baroque music on period instruments.

== Background ==
Founded in 1984, the Hanover-based Musica Alta Ripa is well known for its historically informed musical performances. The ensemble has won four ECHO Klassik prizes, the Cannes Classical Awards, as well as the 2002 Musikpreis Niedersachsen. A particular focus for the group is the work of Georg Philipp Telemann, whose chamber music they have recorded several discs of. The group is also well known for their efforts to strengthen ties between Syrian refugees and locals.

The ensemble's name comes from the city in which they are based, Hanover. Alta ripa means in Latin "high riverbank." Similarly, hanover comes from Old German honovere, also meaning "high riverbank."

== Members ==
The ensemble consists of five members:

- Danya Segal — recorder
- Anne Röhrig, Ulla Bundies — violins
- Albert Brüggen — cello
- Bernward Lohr — harpsichord

== Selected discography ==
Musica Alta Ripa has recorded exclusively with the MDG label.

- Johann Sebastian Bach: Complete concerti
- Johann Sebastian Bach: Complete flute sonatas
- Johann Sebastian Bach: Complete violin sonatas
- Johann Gottlieb Goldberg: Chamber music
- George Frederick Handel: Cantatas and sonatas
- Alessandro Scarlatti: Cantatas
- Georg Philipp Telemann: Concerti and chamber music
- Antonio Vivaldi: Concerti and chamber music
