= Basel Rajoub =

Syrian Swiss saxophone player

Basel Rajoub باسل رجوب
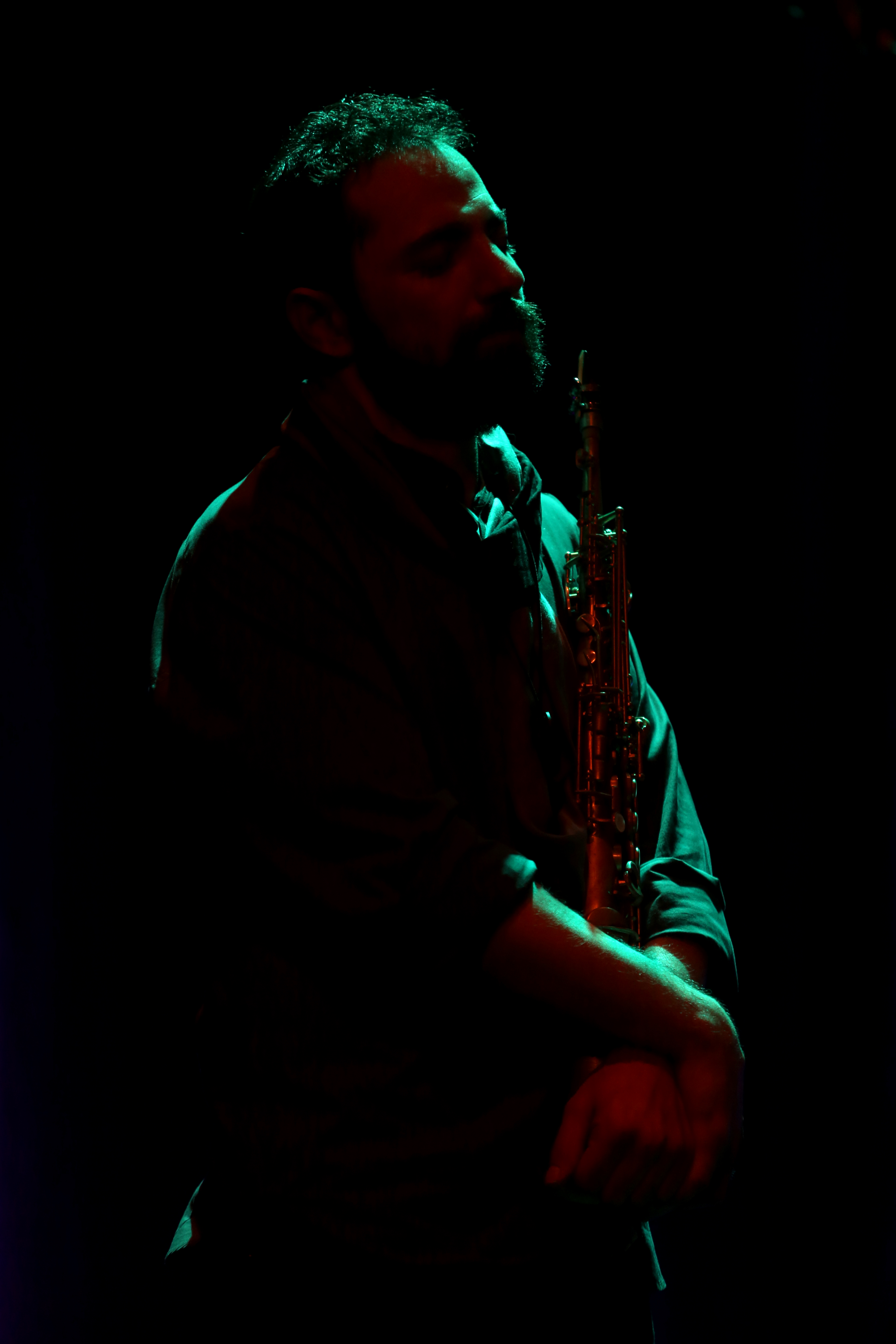

Background information
- Born: Basel Rajoub
- Origin: Syria, Switzerland
- Genres: Middle Eastern music
- Occupation: Musician
- Instrument: Saxophone
- Years active: 2005–present
- Website: www.baselrajoub.org

Basel Rajoub is a Syrian-Swiss saxophone player. An Aleppo-born and Switzerland-based graduate of the High Institute of Music in Damascus, Rajoub is known for developing oriental music for the saxophone. He performs as a solo artist and leader of the Basel Rajoub Ensemble.

== Soriana Project ==
Soriana Project Contemporary Music from the Orient is a body of musical works by Syrian composer and instrumentalist Basel Rajoub. The project features collaborations with like-minded artists celebrating their heritage and paying homage to the gift of musical knowledge.

"Soriana is 'our Syria'. A homeland we left behind, forced out either by a search or by circumstances. We head out thinking that we carry no baggage, completely unaware of the biggest gift our country has bestowed upon us. That gift is the gift of musical knowledge. It remains with me throughout many journeys, it soothes wounds and inspires creation, provides warmth and a platform of stability, images, aromas, tastes that water the mouth and inspire new creations still. This music is my gift to our Syria – Soriana."

== Concerts ==
- 2014-01-29 UK/London Brunei Gallery Lecture Theatre
- 2014-02-08 France/Chamonix Cosmo Jazz Festival
- 2014-04-08 Italy/Quarna sotto Quarna un paese per la musica
- 2014-04-10 Switzerland/Geneva Dans Le Cadre Du Festival Jazzcontreband
- 2014-05-10 Austria/Vienna MuTh - Musik und Theater
- 2014-09-04 Switzerland Cully Jazz Festival
- 2015-01-05 Switzerland/Martigny Caves du Manoir
- 2015-02-05 Switzerland Biel Théâtre de Poche
- 2015-03-27 Switzerland/Geneva AMR Jazz Festival
- 2015-11-20 UK/London - London Jazz Festival
- 2016-01-10 Germany/Berlin Radialsystem
- 2016-05-19 Lebanon/Beirut Sunflower theatre, Springs Festival
- 2016-05-21 Tunisia/Tunis Hamra theatre, Springs Festival
- 2016-05-25 Switzerland/Geneva
- 2016-05-26 Switzerland/Bern ONO
- 2016-05-29 Switzerland/Zurich Moods
- 2016-07-24 France/Nasbinals dans le cadre du festival
- 2016-09-24 France/Paris Institut du Monde Arabe

== Awards ==
- RMC Radio Monticarlo, music arrangements 2006

== Discography ==
- 2008 Khameer
- 2012 Asia
- 2016 The Queen of Turquoise

== Film scores ==
- Roubama (2012), directed by Rakan Mayassi (Jordan). Feature film selection by Locarno Film Festival, Beirut International Film Festival
- Bb (2012) directed by Lamis Al Mouhammad (Syria)
