= Damascus Opera House =

National opera house of Syria

- Arabic: دَارُ أوبرا دمشق
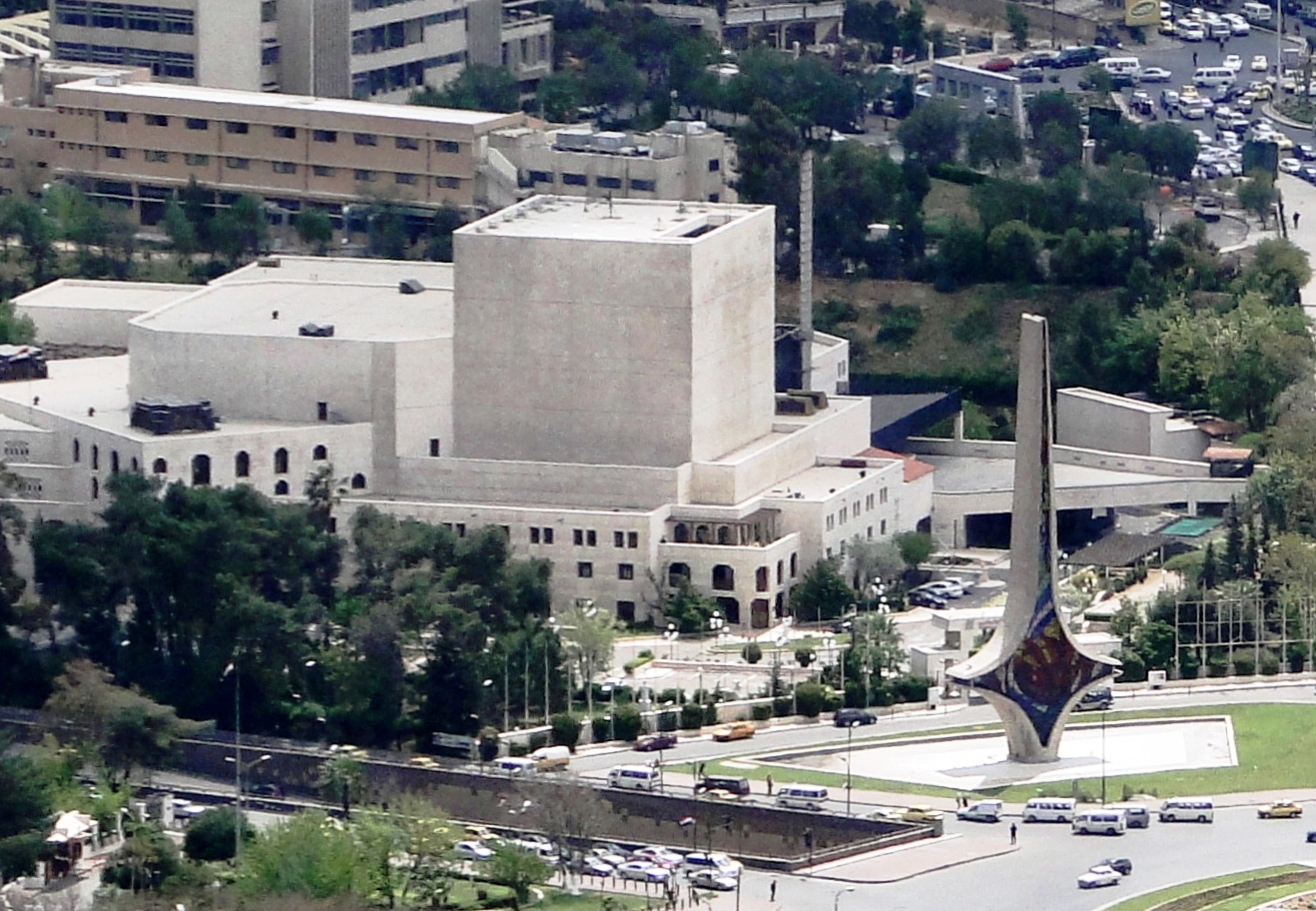
- Damascus Opera House at the Umayyad Square (2010)
- Interactive map of Damascus Opera House
- Address: Damascus; Syria
- Coordinates: 33°30′44″N 36°16′43″E
- Capacity: Opera Theater – 1,331; Drama Theater – 663; Multipurpose Hall – 237
- Type: Multipurpose performing-arts building

Construction
- Opened: 7 May 2004; 22 years ago

Tenants
- Syrian National Symphony Orchestra, Damascus Opera Company

Website
- visitdamascussyria.com/damascus-opera-house/

The Damascus Opera House (formerly Dar al-Assad for Culture and Arts) (Arabic: دار أوبرا دمشق) is the national opera house of Syria. Inaugurated on 7 May 2004, it is located in central Damascus, on the Umayyad Square.

== History ==
Damascus already had an opera house in the 1900s. During the French colonial period, Shahbandar's People's Party held their inaugural meeting at the old Damascus Opera House in 1925. Hafez al-Assad planned the opera house early in his rule, but work did not recommence until the 2000s and Assad's son Bashar and his wife opened the new opera house in 2004.

== The new Damascus Opera House ==
The opera house is a five-level building that includes a 1300-seat theatre for musical productions, a drama theatre of some 600 seats and a small multipurpose hall. Since its opening, it has been the venue of numerous theatrical performances and concerts of classical European or Arabic music, as well as of film shows, such as the European Film Festival in Syria, before the civil war started in 2011.

The Damascus Opera House is the main venue of the Syrian National Symphony Orchestra (SNSO) that has made frequent contributions to musical life in the Syrian capital. Compositions by contemporary Syrian composers have been performed by the SNSO, including works by Iraqi-born musician and educator Solhi al-Wadi, violinist Maias Alyamani, pianist Malek Jandali, or Zaid Jabri, featuring Syrian musicians with international careers, like clarinet soloist Kinan Azmeh.

In 2014, the Opera House was the target of mortar attacks, attributed to rebels against the Syrian government. According to a report in The Times of Israel, two students of the adjacent Higher Institute of Dramatic Arts were killed and several more seriously wounded.

== Damascus Opera Company ==
Aside from visiting foreign artists, the company produced The Marriage of Figaro in 2010. In 2011, the general director of the house and its company was violinist Maria Arnaout, who produced the short opera Gianni Schicchi by Puccini, an international Oriental Music Festival and a Syrian version of the musical Oliver!, casting orphans after the model of Venezuela's El Sistema music organization with street children. So far, the opera house has not included in its programmes opera in Arabic or art song in Arabic.

== Organ ==
One of the world's few hovering air cushion organs is installed in the opera house. The organ was built in 2000 by the organ builder Aug. Laukhuff from Weikersheim in Germany. The instrument has 40 stops on four manuals. The organ can be raised with air cushions and moved on stage. By means of compressors, the air cushions are inflated to such an extent that they lift the 18-ton organ evenly and noiselessly until it floats above the ground. The organ can be moved and set up remotely at any point on the stage. Due to budget restrictions during the civil war in Syria, however, the Opera House has not been able to maintain the instrument.

== Activities during the Civil War ==
The Opera House continued to host music and cultural events sporadically during the war, but at a much reduced level: seasons were shortened, many musicians fled or were killed, and public performances became intermittent and often framed as official and patriotic events. The Syrian National Symphonic Orchestra reported the loss of 74 musicians, many of whom fled to Arab and European countries or to the US. In 2014, a mortar attack killed two and wounded several other students of the neighbouring Higher Institute of Dramatic Arts. Amid intense fighting in the capital's suburbs, the orchestra performed a January concert in 2015 when some 150 rockets were dropped on Damascus.

== Resumption of cultural events ==
On 30 January 2025, the Syrian National Symphony Orchestra performed at the Opera House before a large audience, including diplomats and the new Minister of Health and brother of Syria's president, Maher al-Sharaa and his family. Under the title "For the Martyrs and the Glory of Syria", the concert included works by Beethoven and Tchaikovsky as well as by Syrian composers. Under the baton of the orchestra's principal conductor Missak Baghboudarian, a member of Syria's Armenian minority, it was described as the first classical concert there since the fall of the previous regime. At the beginning, a minute of silence was observed for the more than 500,000 people killed during the civil war. Due to financial constraints, the music hall could not be heated despite the cold winter weather, and musicians and technical staff worked without payment.

Another event titled “Snapshots of Syrian Heritage” was organized by the Ministry of Culture in April 2025, presenting folkloric groups and songs in several of Syria's languages such as Arabic, Kurdish, Armenian, and Circassian. As part of the country-wide “We Have Returned, O Sham” campaign, the Opera House was mentioned among locations of civil society volunteer initiatives and urban-beautification efforts in early 2025.

== See also ==
- List of opera houses
- Music of Syria
