= Manfred Leuchter =

Manfred Johannes Leuchter (born 15 June 1960 in Würselen, Germany) is a German accordionist, composer, pianist and producer of various musical genres. His stylistic influences include rock and pop, jazz and ballads, as well as African and Middle Eastern music.

== Career ==
In the early 2000s, Leuchter was invited by the German Goethe-Institut for concerts with his jazz band in India, Romania, Morocco, Syria, Jordan, Egypt, Palestine and Lebanon. Following encounters with local musicians, he performed and recorded with the Hewar jazz fusion band from Syria and with oud player Driss el Maloumi in Morocco. He has collaborated on albums with Syrian-Armenian singer Lena Chamamyan, Iranian-born singer Sanaz, Scottish guitarist Ian Melrose and Australian singer-songwriter Julia Messenger.

In addition, Leuchter has worked as a producer for various artists, such as German singer-songwriter Reinhard Mey, for whom he has produced various albums and played in live concerts. Further, he has been active as sound engineer as well as composer of music for theatre productions.

Leuchter has mainly lived in Aachen, Germany, and stayed for extended periods in Marrakesh, Morocco.

== Lineup ==
- Duo: Manfred Leuchter (accordion); Ian Melrose (fingerstyle guitar, whistles)
- Trio: Manfred Leuchter (accordion); Afra Mussawisade (percussion); Florian Zenker (guitar)
- Quartet: Manfred Leuchter (accordion); Steffen Thormählen (drums, percussion); Antoine Pütz (electric bass, guembri); Sebastian Pottmeier or Heribert Leuchter (bass, alto, soprano saxophone)

== Discography ==
- Theaterkompositionen (1999)
- Sparito (2000)
- Arabesque (2001)
- Nomade, with Heribert Leuchter (2003)
- Pas de Trois, Trio with Afra Mussawisade and Karim Othman-Hassan (2004)
- Space (2004)
- Zina (2006)
- Nine days of Solitude, The Damascus Session with Hewar and Lena Chamamyan (2007)
- Vis à Vis, Duo with Ian Melrose (2008)
- Kein schöner Land, with Ian Melrose (2011)
- Carpe Momentum, with Ian Melrose (2012)
