= Syrian National Symphony Orchestra =

Orchestra for classical music in Syria

Syrian National Symphony Orchestra الفرقة السيمفونية الوطنية السورية
- Formation: 1993
- Type: Symphony orchestra
- Headquarters: Damascus Opera House
- Conductor: Missak Baghboudarian
- Parent organization: General Association of Dar al-Assad for Culture and Arts
- Website: Syrian National Symphony Orchestra

The Syrian National Symphony Orchestra (Arabic: الفرقة السيمفونية الوطنية السورية, al-firqah as-sīmfūniyyah al-waṭaniyyah as-sūriyyah) is the national symphony orchestra of Syria. Its home venue is the Damascus Opera House, and many of its members have been educated at the Higher Institute for Music in the same cultural complex on Umayyad Square in a central location of Damascus.

== History and musical activities ==
The orchestra was founded by Iraqi-born composer and musician Solhi al-Wadi, its first conductor as well as the director of the Higher Institute for Music in Damascus, and gave its first public concert in 1993. On 4 September 1998, the orchestra performed in the United States, at the Orange County Performing Arts Center. The orchestra has its permanent home in the Damascus Opera House, and its principal conductor is the Syrian-Armenian maestro Missak Baghboudarian, who received his academic training in Italy.

The orchestra's repertoire includes both Western classical music, as well as works by contemporary Syrian composers, including Maias Alyamani, Malek Jandali, or Zaid Jabri. - A charity concert by the orchestra on 3 February 2009 raised $110,000 for an UNRWA campaign for the children of Gaza.

Apart from the symphony orchestra, there is also a Syrian National Orchestra for Arabic Music performing classical Arabic music, with musicians like Syrian oud virtuoso Issam Rafea, trained in this musical tradition of the Middle East.

== Activities during the Civil War ==
The Opera House continued to host music and cultural events sporadically during the war, but at a much reduced level: seasons were shortened, many musicians fled or were killed, and public performances became intermittent and often framed as official and patriotic events. The Syrian National Symphonic Orchestra reported the loss of 74 musicians, many of whom fled to Arab and European countries or to the US. In 2014, a mortar attack killed two and wounded several other students of the neighbouring Higher Institute of Dramatic Arts. Amid intense fighting in the capital's suburbs, the orchestra performed a January concert in 2015 when some 150 rockets were dropped on Damascus.

In July 2020, the SNSO participated with an online performance from Damascus of Beethoven's Eroica symphony in a series of friendship concerts, where Italian conductor Riccardo Muti conducted his Luigi Cherubini Youth Orchestra with Syrian guest musicians in Ravenna, Italy. In January 2024, Baghboudarian spoke about the ways the SNSO has adapted to the difficult social situation. Citing the continued great interest of the audience for classical music in Damascus, he mentioned selecting music with a dramatic expression, such as Beethoven's fifth and third symphonies or Mahler's Songs on the Death of Children. Reaching out to young audiences, he talked about a project under the title "Discover Music", directed towards children living in shelters, organized in cooperation with the Syria Trust for Development. In this project the SNSO invited children to attend the orchestra's training sessions, in order to experience live classical music and to learn about musical instruments. During one cold winter, the orchestra only asked visitors to bring along warm clothes for needy children, instead of buying a ticket.

== Resumption of cultural events ==
On 30 January 2025, the Syrian National Symphony Orchestra performed at the Opera House before a large audience that included diplomats, Maher al-Sharaa and his family. Maher was the acting Minister of Health and the brother of Syria's president, Ahmed al-Sharaa. Under the title "For the Martyrs and the Glory of Syria", the concert included works by Beethoven and Tchaikovsky, as well as works by Syrian composers. Under the baton of the orchestra's principal conductor, Missak Baghboudarian, it was described as the first classical concert held there since the fall of the previous regime. At the beginning of the concert, a minute of silence was observed for the more than 500,000 people killed during the civil war. Due to financial constraints, the concert hall could not be heated despite the cold winter weather, and the musicians and technical staff worked without payment.
