= Solhi al-Wadi =

Solhi al-Wadi صلحي الوادي
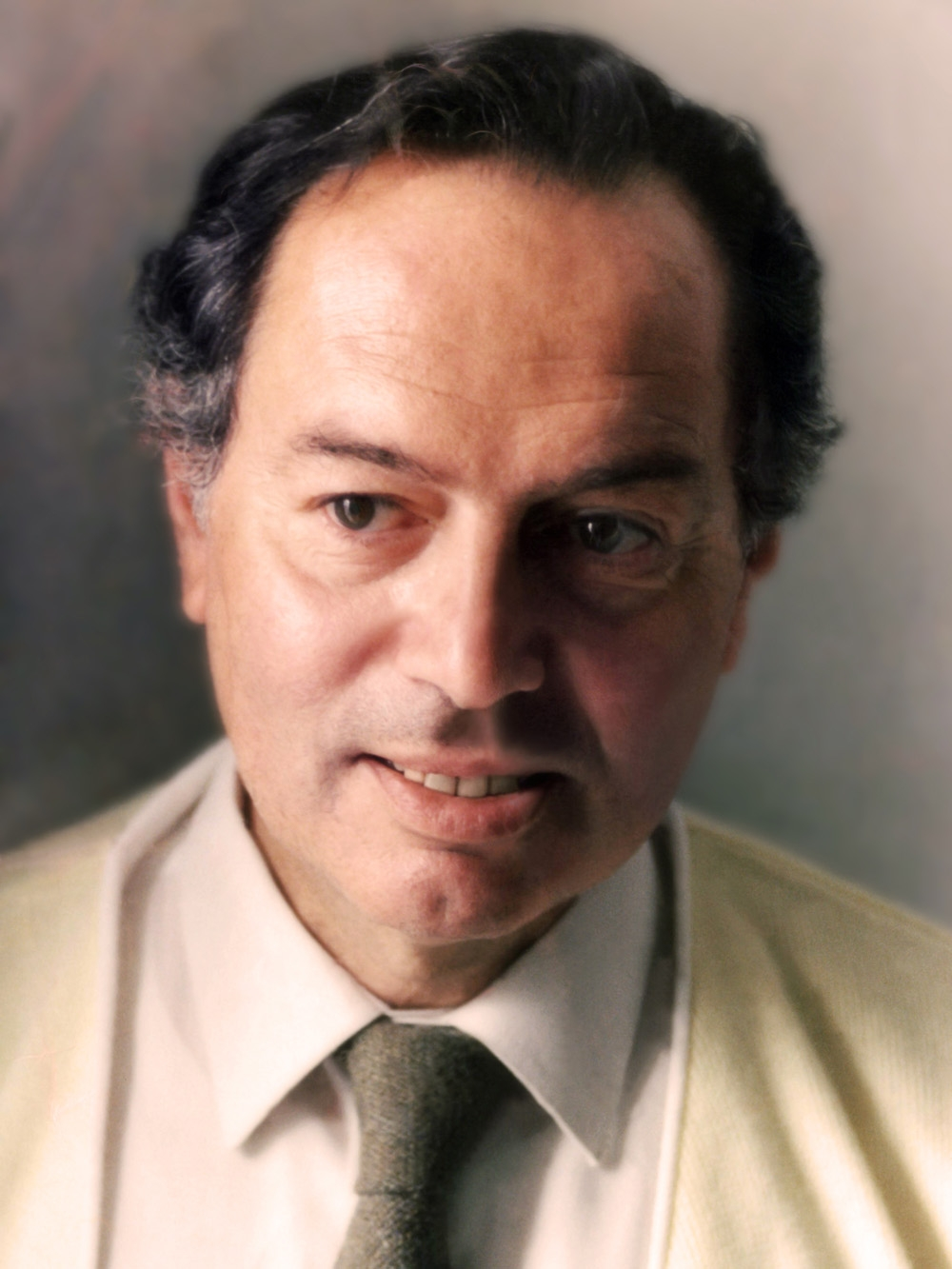
- Solhi al-Wadi in 1979

Background information
- Born: 12 February 1934
- Origin: Baghdad, Iraq
- Died: 30 September 2007 (aged 73)
- Occupations: Conductor, composer, director
- Years active: 1960–2002

Solhi al-Wadi (Arabic: صلحي الوادي, ṣulḥī al-wādī) (1934–2007) was an Iraqi-born musician, conductor, composer, educator and director, who lived most of his life in Damascus, Syria.

== Life ==
Solhi al-Wadi was born in Baghdad on 12 February 1934 to an Iraqi father and a Jordanian mother, who moved to live in Damascus, Syria, when he was a child. He went to Victoria College, a British boarding school in Alexandria, Egypt, where he studied violin and composition at the local conservatory. In 1953 he was admitted to the Royal Academy of Music in London to pursue higher studies in music.

In 1960, after graduating, Solhi al-Wadi returned to Damascus and began work on establishing serious music as part of the fine arts scene in Syria. In 1962 he founded the Arab Institute of Music and was appointed its director. He established relations with several foreign countries, especially the former Soviet Union, to be able to bring qualified teachers in all disciplines and instruments, to teach Syrian youngsters, who were interested in learning music. In 2004 the Arab Institute of Music was renamed the Solhi al-Wadi Institute of Music.

In 1990, after years of negotiating with the Syrian Ministry of Culture and other necessary instances, he succeeded in fulfilling his dream of opening the High Institute of Music and Theater, which provides musicians, theater students and dancers in Syria with higher education, without needing to go abroad to study, and he was appointed its dean. He was also appointed professor of theory, history of music and music appreciation in this institute.

At the same time, through al-Wadi's efforts, the Damascus Opera House – Dar Al-Assad for Culture & Arts – was opened. He was proud of acquiring a German organ especially built for it.

In 1991 another dream of Solhi al-Wadi's came true: the founding of the Syrian National Symphony Orchestra, which gave its first concert under his baton in the same year. Soon invitations started pouring in from all over the world, and over the next few years al-Wadi took the orchestra to perform in Egypt, Iraq, Jordan, Lebanon, Spain, Turkey, Germany and the USA. And also al-Wadi himself was invited to conduct orchestras in several countries of the world.

In 1995 Solhi al-Wadi conducted the first-ever performance of an opera in Syria, Purcell's Dido and Aeneas, which was performed at the ancient Roman amphitheaters of Bosra and Palmyra for huge crowds of enthusiastic listeners.

Solhi al-Wadi's immense overall activity, especially his administrative, teaching and performing duties, allowed him limited time for composing, but he cherished those moments when he could satisfy the great urge he had to express himself. He believed that he should contribute to the world of music by whatever means he was capable of. His works are performed enthusiastically by musicians in Syria and other countries. In addition to that he received throughout his artistic life commissions to compose music for Arabic films, something he accepted and fulfilled with pleasure, but even though incidental music brought him fame all over the Arab world, his compositions for chamber ensembles figure among his finest creative achievements.

Solhi al-Wadi died on 30 September 2007 at home in Damascus. He never recovered from a brain hemorrhage which struck him down while conducting the Syrian National Orchestra in a concert on 27 April 2002.

== Music ==
- Seven pieces for piano (1958–1965)
- Fantasy for Two Pianos in B-flat Major (1962)
- "Love Poem" for String Orchestra (1966)
- Two Pieces for Violoncello & Piano (?)
- Sonata for Violin & Piano No. 1 (1969) (Score missing)
- "Dabké" – Dance for Symphony Orchestra (1970)
- String Quartet No. 1 (Score missing)
- String Quartet No. 2 (1974)
- Trio for Piano, Violin & Violoncello, in memory of Dmitri Shostakovich (1975):
  1. movement Video on YouTube
  2. movement Video on YouTube
  3. movement Video on YouTube
  4. movement Video on YouTube
- Sonata for Violin & Piano No. 2 in A Minor (early 1980s)
- Concert Overture for Symphony Orchestra in C Major (1987)
- Meditation on a Theme by Mhammad Abdel Wahhab "Hayati anta" for Symphony orchestra (1992)
- Piece "-5" for Clarinet Solo (1999)
- Song "The Mummy" for Soprano & Piano (2000) (Poet unknown)
- Incidental and film music (spanning al-Wadi's creative life)

== Awards ==
- 1995 Order of Merit, Syria's highest civilian award
- 1999 honorary doctorate from The Yerevan Komitas State Conservatory (Armenia)
- 2000 honorary doctorate from The Russian Academy of Arts and Sciences
- 2001 Medal of Sts. Peter and Paul awarded by Pope John Paul II, during his Millennium Tour visit to Syria
