= Kremerata Baltica =

Baltic chamber orchestra

- Chamber orchestra
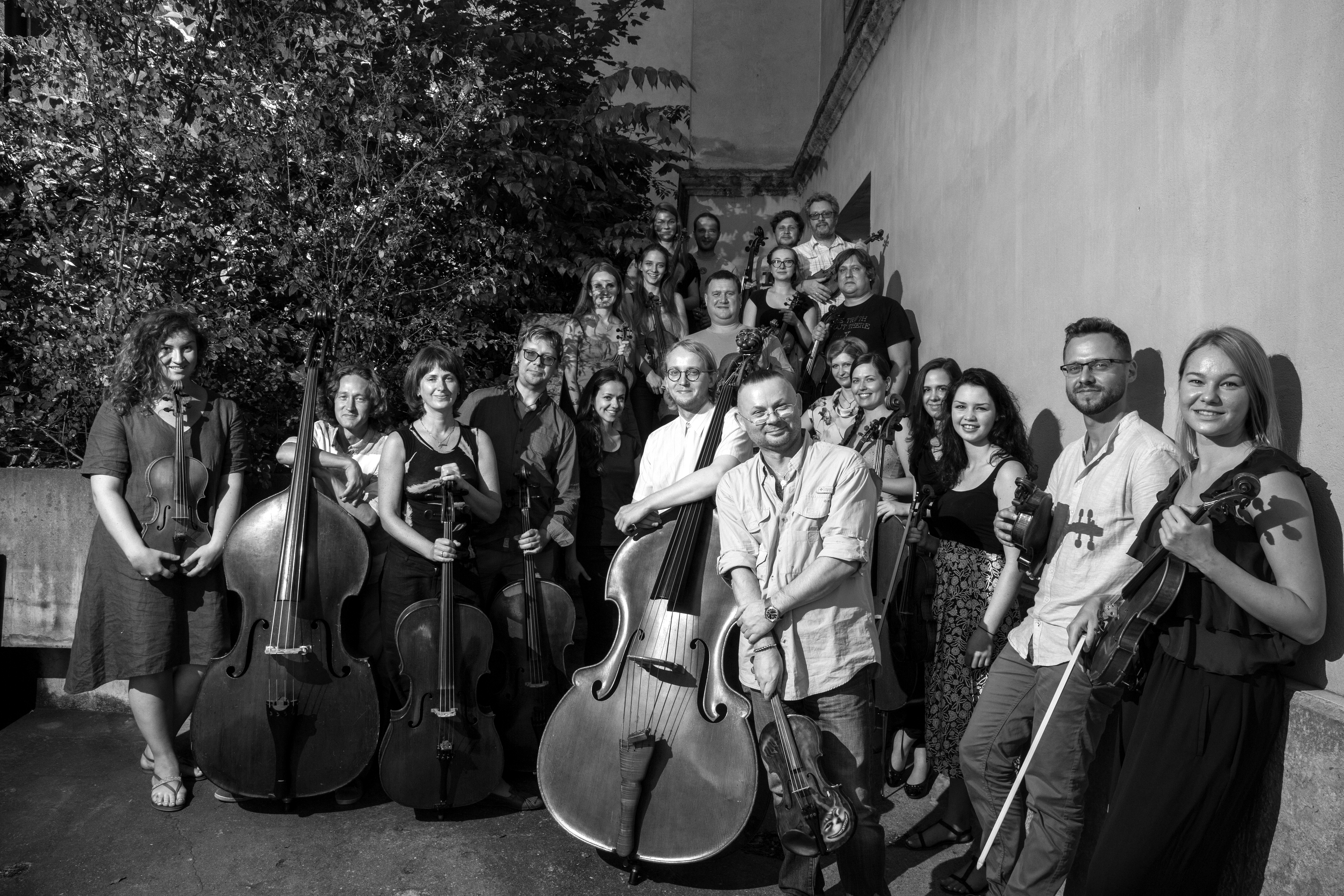
- Photo by Christian Lutz
- Founded: 1997
- Website: www.kremeratabaltica.com

The Kremerata Baltica is a chamber orchestra consisting of musicians from Baltic countries (Estonia, Latvia, Lithuania). It was founded by Latvian violinist Gidon Kremer in 1997. Gidon Kremer is an artistic director of Kremerata Baltica.

== Description ==
Kremerata Baltica first appeared on stage of Austria's Lockenhaus Chamber Music Festival and since then has become well known for its energy and joy in playing. The orchestra was formed as an educational project promoting the cultural life of the Baltics.

By Los Angeles Times they were described as "extraordinary young players ... [who] animate everything their bows touch."

Kremerata Baltica performs around 70 concerts annually during tours throughout Europe, Asia, and the Americas. Regular performances are held in Germany, Austria, Switzerland, United Kingdom, Japan, the United States of America, and other countries concert halls like Carnegie Hall (USA), Schloss Neuhardenberg, Schloss Elmau, Philharmonie im Gasteig in Munich (Germany), Schloss Esterhazy, Lockenhaus, Musikverein (Austria), Rudolfinum (Czech Republic), the Royal Albert Hall (United Kingdom). During its career the orchestra visited many festivals – Salzburg Festival, Schleswig-Holstein Musik Festival, the Prague Spring, The Proms, Mecklenburg-Vorpommern, etc. Kremerata Baltica also holds its own Festival in Sigulda, Latvia since 2003.

While the majority of the concerts are led by and performed with Gidon Kremer, Kremerata Baltica has appeared with artists like soprano Jessye Norman; pianists Martha Argerich, Mikhail Pletnev, Evgeny Kissin, Oleg Maisenberg, Daniil Trifonov; violinists Thomas Zehetmair, Vadim Repin, Tatiana Grindenko; cellists Boris Pergamenschikov, Yo-Yo Ma, Mischa Maisky, David Geringas; conductors include Sir Simon Rattle, Esa-Pekka Salonen, Christoph Eschenbach, Kent Nagano, Heinz Holliger, Vladimir Ashkenazy, Mirga Gražinytė-Tyla.

In recent seasons the ensemble has pushed back the boundaries of its work to include events such as "To Russia with Love", a concert staged at Berlin's Philharmonie in 2013 to promote the cause of human rights in Russia, and "All About Gidon", a part-scenic autobiographical show in which Gidon Kremer performs works close to his heart and speaks about the life and career of an artist. Since 2013 Kremerata Baltica and Gidon Kremer have partnered the famous Russian clown and mime artist Slava Polunin and his Academy of Fools in "Snow Symphony", a joint project based on Polunin's "Snowshow". In 2015 the ensemble launched its creative project "Masks and Faces", collaboration between Gidon Kremer and the Russian painter, polemicist and philosopher Maxim Kantor. The latest Kremerata Baltica project "Pictures from the East" is a joint venture with a Syrian artist Nizar Ali Badr, which focuses on the situation in the Middle East and the current refugee problem.

Essential to Kremerata Baltica's artistic personality is its creative approach to programming, which often looks beyond the mainstream and has given rise to numerous world premieres of works by composers such as Arvo Pärt, Giya Kancheli Pēteris Vasks, Leonid Desyatnikov, Alexander Raskatov, Artūrs Maskats. The chamber orchestra is supported by the governments of three Baltic States – Estonia, Latvia, Lithuania.

== Recordings ==
Mieczyslaw Weinberg: Chamber Symphonies & Piano Quintet
Works by Mieczysław Weinberg
Performed by: Gidon Kremer, Kremerata Baltica, Yulianna Avdeeva, Mate Bekavac, Mirga Gražinytė-Tyla
2017, ECM New Series ECM 2538/39

Shostakovich: Piano Concertos
Works by Dmitri Shostakovich
Performed by: Anna Vinnitskaya, Kremerata Baltica, Tobias Willner, Ivan Rudin
2015, Alpha Classics Alpha 203

Chiaroscuro
Works by Giya Kancheli
Performed by: Gidon Kremer, Kremerata Baltica, Patricia Kopatchinskaja
2015, ECM NeSe 2442

New Seasons
Works by P. Glass, A. Pärt, G. Kancheli, S. Umebayashi,
Performed by: Gidon Kremer, Kremerata Baltica, Giedre Dirvanauskaite, Andrei Pushkarev, Girls' Choir of Vilnius Choir-Singin School "Liepaites"
2015, Deutsche Grammophon 0289 479 4817

Mieczysław Weinberg
Works by Mieczysław Weinberg
Performed by: Gidon Kremer, Kremerata Baltica, Daniil Trifonov, Daniil Grishin, Giedre Dirvanauskaite, Danielis Rubinas
2014, ECM New Series 2368-69

The Art of Instrumentation: Homage to Glenn Gould
Works by Valentin Silvestrov, Georgs Pelecis, Alexander Raskatov, Alexander Wustin, Carl Vine, Raminta Serksnyte, Giya Kancheli, Leonid Desyatnikov, Victoria Vita Poleva, Stevan Kovacs Tickmayer, Victor Kissine.
Performed by: Gidon Kremer, Andrei Pushkarev, Dita Krenberga, Justina Gelgotaite, Reinut Tepp, Dzeraldas Bidva, Agne Doveikaite-Rubiniene, Daniil Grishin, Vidas Vekerotas, Giedre Dirvanauskaite, Peteris Cirksis, Kremerata Baltica
2012, Nonesuch Records 528982

Transfigurations
Works by: F. Schubert
Performed by: Gidon Kremer, Kremerata Baltica
2012, Burleske

De Profundis
Works by Jean Sibelius, Arvo Pärt, Raminta Šerkšnyte, Robert Schumann, Michael Nyman, Franz Schubert, Stevan Kovacs Tickmayer, Dmitri Shostakovich, Lera Auerbach, Astor Piazzolla, Georgs Pelecis, and Alfred Schnittke
Performed by: Gidon Kremer, Kremerata Baltica
2010, Nonesuch Records 287228

Hymns and Prayers
Works by Stevan Kovacs Tickmayer, César Franck and Giya Kancheli
Performed by: Gidon Kremer, Roman Kofman, Khatia Buniatishvili, Andrei Pushkarev, Marija Nemanyte, Maxim Rysanov, Giedre Dirvanauskaite, Sofia Altunashvili, Kremerata Baltica
2010, ECM 2161

Mozart: Piano Concertos 20 & 27
Works by: Wolfgang Amadeus Mozart
Performed by: Evgeny Kissin, Kremerata Baltica
2010, EMI 26645

Mozart: The Complete Violin Concertos
Works by: Wolfgang Amadeus Mozart
Performed by: Gidon Kremer, Kremerata Baltica
2009, Nonesuch Records 512789

Gustav Mahler/Dmitri Shostakovich
Works by: G. Mahler/D. Shostakovich
Performed by: Gidon Kremer, Yulia Korpacheva, Fedor Kuznetsov, Kremerata Baltica
2007, ECM 8372024

Shostakovich
Works by: D. Shostakovich
Performed by: Gidon Kremer, Yuri Bashmet, Kremerata Baltica
2006, Deutsche Grammophon 477 619-6

Lollipops/Georgs Pelecis
Works by: F. Schubert, J. S. Bach, S. Gubaidulina, F. Mendelssohn, F. A. Mozart, R. Schumann, B. Bartok, D. Schostakowitsch, A. Piazzolla, J. Mandel, V. Reinfeldt, G. Miller, G. Pelecis
Performed by: Gidon Kremer, Kremerata Baltica
2006, Burleske

String Quartet in G Major
Works by: F. Schubert (arr. V. Kissine)
Performed by: Gidon Kremer, Kremerata Baltica
2005, ECM 8371883

In l'istesso tempo
Works by: Giya Kancheli
Performed by: Gidon Kremer, Oleg Maisenberg, Kremerata Baltica, Bridge Ensemble
2005, ECM 8371767

G. Pelecis: Revelation
Works by: G. Pelecis
Performed by: Gidon Kremer, Kremerata Baltica
2005, Burleske

Kremerland
Works by: F. Liszt, G. Kancheli, S. Dreznin, L. Czishyk, A. Vustin, A. Bakshi, G. Pelecis, Ī. Dunayevsky, W. A. Mozart
Performed by: Gidon Kremer, Marta Sudraba, Leonids Czishyk, Andrei Pushkarev, Danelius Rubins, Kremerata Baltica
2004, Deutsche Grammophon 474 8012

Russian Seasons
Works by: L. Desyatnikov, A. Raskatov
Performed by: Gidon Kremer, Julija Korpaceva, Kremerata Baltica
2003, Nonesuch Records 79803

Happy Birthday
Performed by: Gidon Kremer, Kremerata Baltica
2003, Nonesuch Records 79657

George Enescu
Works by: G. Enescu
Performed by: Gidon Kremer, Dzeraldas Bidva, Ula Ulijona, Marta Sudraba, Andrius Zlabys, Kremerata Baltica
2002, Nonesuch Records 79682

Tracing Astor
Works by: A. Piazzolla, G. Sollima, L. Desyatnikov, G. Pelecis
Performed by: Gidon Kremer, Ula Ulijona, Marta Sudraba, Sol Gabetta, Leonid Desyatnikov, Horacio Ferrer, Kremerata Baltica
2001, Nonesuch Records 79601

After Mozart
Works by: W. A. Mozart, A. Raskatov, A. Schnittke, V. Silvestrov
Performed by: Gidon Kremer, Kremerata Baltica
2001, Nonesuch Records 79633

Silencio
Works by: A. Pärt, P. Glass, V. Martynov
Performed by: Gidon Kremer, Kremerata Baltica, Tatjana Grindenko, Reinuts Teps, Eri Klas
2000, Nonesuch Records 79582

Eight Seasons
Works by: A. Vivaldi, A. Piazzolla
Performed by: Gidon Kremer, Kremerata Baltica
2000, Nonesuch Records 79568

Tango Ballet
Works by: A. Piazzolla
Performed by: Gidon Kremer, Kremerata Baltica, Ula Zebriunaite, Marta Sudraba, Pers Arne Glorvigens, Aloizs Poss, Vadims Saharovs
1999, Teldec 22661

Vasks: Distant Light / Voices
Works by: P. Vasks
Performed by: Gidon Kremer, Kremerata Baltica
1999, Teldec 22660

== Honors and awards ==
- ECHO Klassik award in 2016 in the category of "Concert Recording (Music of the 20th/21st Centuries)
- Grammy Award nomination in 2015 for recording "Mieczysław Weinberg" (ECM New Series, 2014) in the category of Classical Music: Best Classical Compendium
- Grammy Award in 2002 for recording "After Mozart" (Nonesuch, 2001) in the category of Classical Music: Best Small Ensemble Performance
- ECHO Klassik prize in 2002 for recording "After Mozart" (Nonesuch, 2001)
- Praemium Imperiale Grant for Young Artists in 2009
- Daily Latvian newspaper's "Diena" annual prize in culture in 2004, 2012
- The supreme Latvian state award in music "The Grand Music Award (LMB)" 1999, 2004

== See also ==
- List of youth orchestras
