= List of Arabic-English translators =

Arabic–English translators are alphabetically listed below.

== A ==
- Farouk Abdel Wahab
- Leila Abouzeid
- Kareem James Abu-Zeid
- Sinan Antoon
- A. J. Arberry
- Albakry Mohammed
- Forster Fitzgerald Arbuthnot

== B ==
- Adil Babikir
- Aida Bamia
- Joseph Bell
- Marilyn Booth
- Keith Bosley
- Angele Botros Samaan
- Issa J. Boullata
- Sargon Boulus
- Paul Bowles
- Leon Carl Brown
- Richard Francis Burton

== C ==
- Anthony Calderbank
- Yigal Carmon
- Catherine Cobham
- Thomas Cleary
- Elliot Colla
- Miriam Cooke
- Michael Cooperson
- Robyn Creswell

== D ==
- Humphrey T. Davies
- N. J. Dawood

== E ==
- Abba Eban

== F ==
- Nicole Fares
- Ahmed Fathy
- Elizabeth Fernea
- Bassam Frangieh

== G ==
- Ferial Ghazoul
- Sayed Gouda
- William Granara
- William Alexander Greenhill

== H ==
- Marilyn Hacker
- Hala Halim
- Stuart A. Hancox
- Nay Hannawi
- Michelle Hartman
- Paula Haydar
- Samuel Hazo
- Sherif Hetata
- Sawad Hussain
- William M. Hutchins

== J ==
- Elisabeth Jaquette
- Salma Khadra Jayyusi
- Zahra Jhishi
- Denys Johnson-Davies
- Fady Joudah

== K ==
- Reem Kelani

== L ==
- Trevor LeGassick
- Frances Liardet

== M ==
- Khaled al-Masri
- Khaled Mattawa
- Karen McNeil
- James T. Monroe
- Ibrahim Muhawi

== N ==
- Daniel L. Newman
- Amira Nowaira
- Osman Nusairi

== O ==
- Wen-chin Ouyang

== Q ==
- Tahera Qutbuddin

== R ==
- Jeremy Reed
- Nancy N. Roberts
- Barbara Romaine

== S ==
- Ahmad Sadri
- Samah Selim
- Saadi Simawe
- Reuven Snir
- Ahdaf Soueif
- Paul Starkey
- Raymond Stock

== T ==
- Maia Tabet
- Peter Theroux
- Christopher Tingley

== V ==
- John Verlenden

== W ==
- Magdi Wahba
- Max Weiss
- Lisa White
- Jonathan Wright

== Y ==
- Nariman Youssef

== See also ==
- Banipal Prize for Arabic Literary Translation
