= Woman at Point Zero (opera) =

Opera by Bushra El-Turk

- Opera by Bushra El-Turk
- Librettist: Stacy Hardy
- Language: English
- Based on: Woman at Point Zero by Nawal El Saadawi
- Premiere: 2022 (full opera); Aix-en-Provence Festival

Woman at Point Zero is an English and Arabic language multimedia opera in one act, with music by British composer Bushra El-Turk and libretto by South African writer Stacy Hardy. It is based on the 1975 novel of the same name by Nawal El Saadawi.

== Background and synopsis ==
The opera reflects the book in having two central characters. A documentary filmmaker, Sama, persuades Fatma, a sex worker imprisoned for killing her pimp, to tell her story. As her traumatic life story is revealed, including various forms of male sexual violence and familial abuse, there is also a multimedia element including video designed by Bissane al Charif and Julia König. The opera concludes with Sama encouraging Fatma to appeal against her sentence, but she refuses, instead asking Sama to tell her story to the world.

Besides accordion and cello, the musical score contains a variety of non-Western instruments, including the Armenian duduk, Korean daegeum, Japanese shō and Iranian kamancheh, played by musicians from Ensemble Zar.

== Roles ==
Roles, voice types, and premiere cast
Role	Voice type	Premiere cast, July 2022 Conductor: Kanako Abe
Fatma	mezzo-soprano	Dima Orsho
Sama	mezzo-soprano	Carla Nahadi Babelegoto

== Performance history and critical reception ==
Excerpts of El-Turk's opera were first performed as a work in progress at the 2017 Shubbak festival of contemporary Arab culture in London. In 2020, this piece was awarded the Fedora-Generali Prize for Opera, allowing it to be subsequently fully produced for the operatic stage.

Woman at Point Zero was chosen by the jury of the Fedora-Generali Prize for Opera 2020, partly because of its compelling story, partly because it was a truly international partnership, but perhaps most of all because it was a combination of composer, librettist, director and filmmaker of emerging talent, which we want to bring to the world.

— Nicholas Payne, Director of Opera Europa and Chair of the Fedora-Generali Prize for Opera Jury 2020,

The complete version was first performed as a production of the Belgian LOD Music Theatre, with stage direction by Egyptian theatre director Laila Soliman, at the 2022 Aix-en-Provence Festival. This first full performance at Aix-en-Provence was described as a "grim premiere" by Zachary Woolfe of the New York Times. Woolfe felt the score created "few new or intriguing colors" despite the "unusual combinations", and also criticised the libretto as having "flattened the two women...into cliché".

The opera was later staged in June 2023 at the Linbury Theatre, part of the Royal Opera House in London, with the same cast and conductor. Gary Naylor of BroadwayWorld gave it a 5-star review, calling it an "important, moving work". Naylor also praised the interpretation by Japanese conductor Kanako Abe, and stated that this and the multimedia elements contributed to the creation of an "aural dreamscape". He further called it "beautiful and brutal in equal measure", with a sense of defiance. Further performances in 2023 included venues in Belgium, Luxembourg, and Valencia, Spain.

Writing for the musical magazine bachtrack about the performance of 15 September 2023 at the Palau de les Arts in Valencia, music critic Daniel Martínez Babiloni stressed the apparent Brechtian interrelationship between the opera's text, music, acting and scenography, with the performance insinuating "more than it shows".

The richest section [...] was the musical one. The novel itself is an extremely sonorous text. There are constantly blows, sobs, more or less muffled screams, creaks from the beds in which Fardous is penetrated again and again, tinkling of piasters and voices from the women who live in other cells. Bushra El-Turk intelligently recreates this variety of timbres. From the moment we enter the room, we hear recordings of testimonies in Arabic from women who have suffered this same repression. They then merge with the sung or spoken text in English and with the instrumentation. The seven instrumentalists, in addition to playing, gasp, shout, whisper or percussion with parts of their bodies. They are musician-actors who get up, walk, point, look and scold the protagonists. An influence on the music of Brechtian experimental theater.

— Daniel Martínez Babiloni, music critic, for bachtrack magazine, Ensems also chants #MeToo with Woman at Point Zero

On 12 November 2024 Woman at Point Zero won the Ivor Novello Award for Best Stage Work Composition at The Ivors Classical Awards.
