= Stacy Hardy =

South African writer

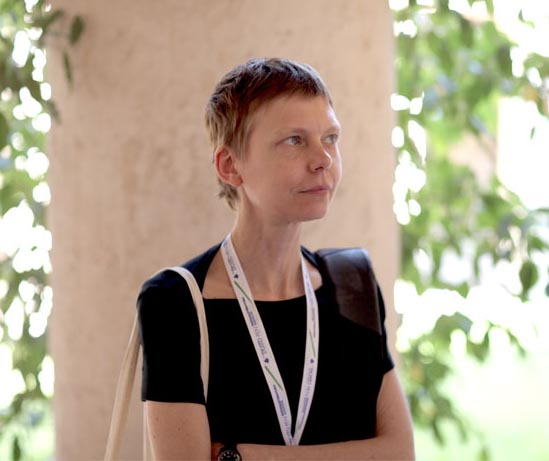
- Stacy Hardy at Festivaletteratura 2010
- Known for: Writer
- Notable work: Because the Night, An Archaeology of Holes
- Awards: Best Experimental Film 2006at the Festival Chileno Internacional del Cortometraje de Santiago Brittle Paper Award for Fiction 2018, Fedora Prize for Opera 2020

Stacy M. Hardy is a writer, a teacher, a researcher, and an editor at Chimurenga, a pan-African journal.

Since 2014, Hardy is a lecturer in the Creative Writing Department at Wits University, South Africa, and has taught creative writing in informal and non-academic contexts.

Hardy is a partner in Saseni, a creative writing teaching initiative that connects higher education and the creative arts in Africa, and the founder of Ukuthula, a pan-African initiative that develops new writing from and against gender-based violence. She has hosted interdisciplinary workshops and writing intensives in diverse locations, including Dakar, Kigali, Cairo, Tombwa (Angola), Nairobi, Lagos, Berlin, New York, and online, and facilitated graduate seminars and writing workshops worldwide. Hardy's writing has appeared in various publications worldwide, including The Johannesburg Review of Books, New Contrast, the New Orleans Review, The Evergreen Review, and many more.

== Published works ==
Her published works include Because the Night, a collection of short fiction published by Pocko Books, London, in 2015. In 2022, a new collection of her short fiction, Archéologie des Trous, was published in French translation by Rot-Bo-Krik, Paris, and the English version was released by Bridge Books, Chicago in 2023.

== Awards ==
She has won multiple awards for her work, including the 2018 Brittle Paper Award for Fiction, and has been a finalist or semifinalist for many others, such as the 2022 Noemi Press Book Award and the 2018 Caine Prize. In addition to her writing, Hardy is also involved in the production of multimedia works. She collaborates with Angolan composer, performer, and instrument designer Victor Gama, and their works have been performed at various venues, including the Harris Theatre in Chicago, USA, the Department of Music Stanford University in Stanford, CA, USA, and Haus der Kulturen der Welt in Berlin. In July 2022, a new iteration of their collaboration received a Prince Claus Fund Award for Cultural and Artistic Responses to Environmental Change award to open a pop up art laboratory in the Namib desert in Angola. Hardy’s one-woman performance piece, Museum of Lungs, which she created together with Egyptian director Laila Soliman and musicians Neo Muyanga and Nancy Mounir, premiered at the Market Theatre in Johannesburg in September 2018. It went on to have an extensive European tour from 2018 to 2019, including dates at Kaserne in Basel and Spielart in Munich.

== Opera ==
Hardy wrote the libretto for Woman at Point Zero a new opera with composer Bushra El-Turk and director Laila Soliman, which won the prestigious Fedora - Generali Prize for Opera 2020. The opera premiered at Festival d’Aix-en-Provence in 2022 and received critical acclaim. Future performances include appearances at the All Arias festival in deSingel Antwerpen, Opera Ballet Vlaanderen, Concertgebouw Brugge, Muziekcentrum De Bijloke Gent, Royal Opera House London, Shubbak Festival London, and Snape Maltings UK in 2023.

== Networks and projects ==
In addition to her artistic pursuits, Hardy is involved in numerous interdisciplinary networks and research projects. She is a member of Connectors, an international network that brings together academics and organisations playing important roles at the intersection of engagement between health and research. She is also one of the organisers of “Planetary Health and Postcolonial Dis-Ease,” an international research project focused on the multi-sited politics of environment and health, hosted by the Department of Social and Cultural Anthropology at the University of Vienna. Currently, Hardy is a research fellow at the University of Chicago, where she is working on a research-and-performance-based collaborative endeavour with anthropologist Kaushik Sunder Rajan, musician Neo Muyanga, and poet Daniel Borzutsky. Their project explores the politics and poetics of breath through a focus on colonial histories and postcolonial politics.
