= Nay Hannawi =

Lebanese translator

Nay Hannawi is a Lebanese translator. She obtained a bachelor's degree at the American University in Beirut and an MFA in translation at the University of Arkansas. Since 2002, she has been teaching English language and literature at the Arab Open University in Kuwait.

Hannawi is a past winner of the Arkansas Arabic Translation Award for her translation of Jabbour Douaihy's novel Autumn Equinox. Her poetry has appeared in the Alaska Quarterly Review.

== See also ==
- List of Arabic-English translators
