= Kanako Abe =

Japanese conductor, composer and pianist

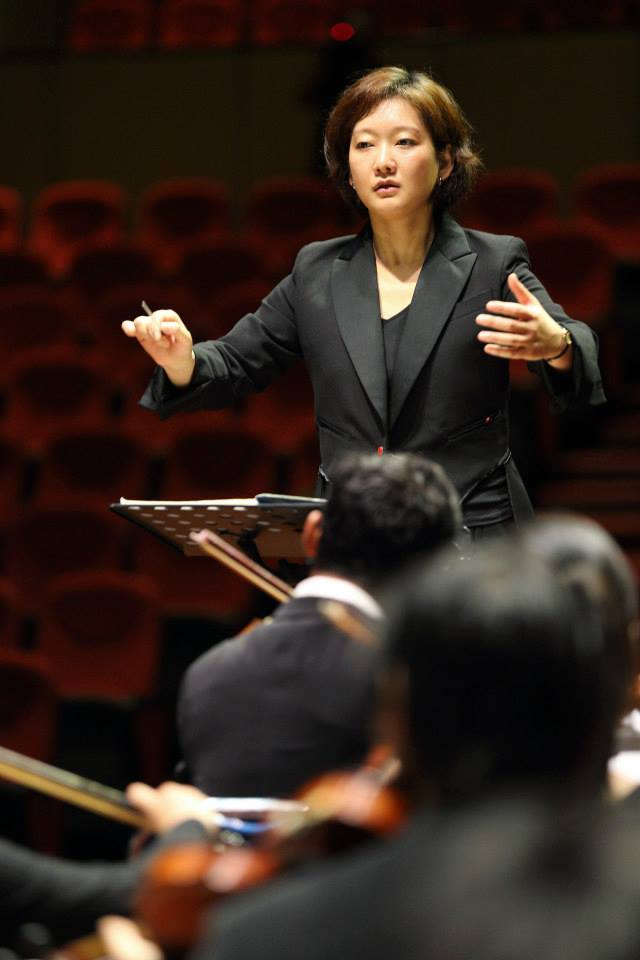
Abe conducting in 2014

Kanako Abe (Japanese: 阿部 加奈子, romanized: Abe Kanako; born 23 March 1973 in Ōsaka, Ōsaka prefecture) is a Japanese conductor, composer and pianist. Based in The Hague, Netherlands, she has performed works by contemporary composers, including Tōru Takemitsu, Michaël Levinas, Régis Campo and Bushra El-Turk.

== Life and career ==
Abe was born in Osaka in 1973 and received piano lessons from her mother from an early age. She attended music classes at Sōai University in Osaka, attended a high school affiliated with the music faculty of the Tokyo University of the Arts, and eventually studied composition at that university. This was followed by studies at the Paris Conservatory, which she completed in the seven subjects of harmony and harmony theory, counterpoint, fugue, instrumentation, composition analysis, instrumental accompaniment and conducting. Abe studied with renowned musicians, including composition with Masayuki Nagatomi, piano with Jean Körner, instrumentation with Marc-André Dalbavie, and conducting with János Fürst and Péter Eötvös.

In 2005 she founded the music ensemble Multilatérale in Paris and worked as the ensemble's musical director. In 2006 she attended the 50th Venice Biennale, where she conducted a performance of an opera by French composer Michaël Levinas. By 2023, Kanako Abe had already premiered over 180 new works. From 2008 to 2009 she worked as deputy conductor at the Opéra national de Montpellier with Lawrence Foster, Jerzy Semkow and Alain Altinoglu.

In October 2010 she conducted the world premiere of Dalbavie's opera Gesualdo at the Zürich Opera House. In 2014 she worked as deputy kapellmeister for Fabio Luisi in the performance of Alfredo Casella's opera La donna serpente. As a pianist and conductor, she has so far released five albums with recordings of Takemitsu Tōru's works. In 2012 she received the Prix Italia for a radio opera. Further, Abe has worked with numerous ensembles and orchestras, such as the Pasdeloup Orchestra, the Orchestre National de Lorraine, the Orchestra Nipponika, the Tokyo Philharmonic Orchestra, the Ensemble l'Itinéraire and the Smash Ensemble.

After the Tōhoku earthquake in 2011 she was head of the executive committee for the charity concert at the UNESCO headquarter in Paris and conducted the Japon Aide Orchestra, which consisted of many volunteer musicians. Since 2013, Kanako has been chairwoman of the Association Franco-Japonaise de la Musique Contemporaine (日仏現代音楽協会). Since 2014, Kanako has been musical director of the Indonesian Youth Symphony Orchestra and artistic director of Musica Universalis.

In April 2022 she conducted the world premiere of the multi-media opera Woman at Point Zero of the British componer Bushra El-Turk at the Aix-en-Provence Festival, based on the novel of the same name by Egyptian writer and feminist Nawal El Saadawi. The opera was again staged in June 2023 at the Linbury Theatre, part of the Royal Opera House in London, with the same cast and conductor. Gary Naylor of BroadwayWorld gave it a 5-star review, calling it an "important, moving work". Naylor also praised the interpretation by Kanako Abe and stated that her interpretation and the multimedia elements contributed to the creation of an "aural dreamscape".

As of the 2022–23 season Kanako Abe is music director of the Orchestre Symphonique des Dômes in the French Auvergne region. In Japan, she has worked as music director of Ensemble Orochi, as well for the chamber ensemble for contemporary music Tokyo Ensemnable Factory and the Ensemble Muromachi. Further, Abe is president of the Association Franco-Japonaise de Musique Contemporaine, a French-Japanese organization for the promotion of contemporary music in France and Japan.

== Selected discography ==
- Régis Campo: Piano concerto, Music to hear (1998/1999)
- Tōru Takemitsu, Complete Piano Works (2004)
- Colin Roche, La robe des choses (2005)
- Régis Campo, Pop-art (2006)
- Noëls anciens (2022)
- Mendelssohn/Tailleferre/Canat de Chizy/Clyn /El-Turk/Holmès/Pépin (2023)
