= The Fall of the Imam =

1987 novel by Nawal el Saadawi

- 1st English edition
- Author: Nawal El Saadawi
- Translator: Sherif Hetata
- Language: Arabic
- Publisher: Methuen (UK)
- Publication date: 1987
- Publication place: Egypt
- English publication date: 1988
- Media type: Print (paperback)
- Pages: 174
- ISBN: 0413175103

The Fall of the Imam is a novel by Egyptian writer Nawal El Saadawi published in Arabic in 1987. The English translation by the author's husband Sherif Hetata was published in 1988.

== Plot summary ==
Set in an unnamed Arab country, the two main characters are The Imam, the hypocritical leader of the country, full of hatred and spite towards anybody born more fortunate than him, and a beautiful illegitimate orphan, Bint Allah (Daughter of God). The story centres around two extremely grisly events. First, the stoning and mutilation of a woman, performed more to terrorize his opponents and silence his critics than to conform to God's will, leaves the reader in no doubt as to the brutality of the ruling power. The second event is the assassination of the Imam himself, and the turmoil this brings to the country.
