= God Dies by the Nile =

1974 novel by Nawal el Saadawi

- Author: Nawal El Saadawi
- Original title: Mawt al-rajul al-wahid ‘ala al-ard
- Translator: Sherif Hetata
- Language: Arabic
- Publication date: 1974
- Publication place: Egypt

God Dies by the Nile (Arabic: مـوت الـرجـل الـوحـيـد على الأرض, Mawt al-rajul al-wahid ‘ala al-ard, lit. "The Death of the Only Man on Earth") is a 1974 Arabic-language novel by Egyptian feminist writer Nawal El Saadawi. It was published in English translation in 1985. The novel is a critical exploration of patriarchal oppression, political corruption, and the misuse of religion in a rural Egyptian village, and is considered one of El Saadawi's most significant works.

== Plot ==
In the fictional Egyptian village of Kafr El Teen, situated along the Nile river, live Zakeya, a poor peasant widow, and her family: her brother Kafrawi and his two daughters, Nefissa and Zeinab.

The village is tyrannically ruled by the Mayor (also referred to as the Chief), a powerful, half-British, half-Egyptian figure who represents the intertwined forces of patriarchy, political power, and colonial legacy. He is supported by a trio of enablers: Sheikh Zahran (head of the village guard), Sheikh Hamzawi (the village imam), and Haj Ismail (the barber and healer).

The Mayor uses his power to sexually and economically exploit the peasantry. He forces Nefissa to work in his household, where he rapes her, leading to her pregnancy and eventual forced exile. He then orchestrates a scheme, involving a manipulated religious prophecy, to force Zeinab into his service as well. Kafrawi is falsely imprisoned for a murder committed by the Mayor. Zakeya's son, Galal, returns from military service, marries Zeinab, and is subsequently framed for theft and imprisoned by the Mayor's allies to remove him as an obstacle.

Meanwhile, Nefissa gives birth to the Mayor's child and abandons it at the doorstep of Sheikh Hamzawi. His wife, Fatheya, defies her husband and the village by adopting the "child of sin." For this act of rebellion, Fatheya and the child are brutally stoned to death by the villagers.

After losing her entire family to the Mayor's predation and the village's complicity, Zakeya undergoes a psychological and political awakening. She realizes that the "God" who has failed to answer her prayers is embodied by the tyrannical Mayor. In an act of ultimate defiance, Zakeya kills the Mayor with her hoe and buries him by the Nile, declaring, "I have buried Allah there on the bank of the Nile." She gets arrested.

== Creation ==
El Saadawi stated she considers God Dies by the Nile her "most significant novel." The original Arabic title was censored by her Arab publishers due to its provocative religious metaphor. The English title, God Dies by the Nile, is the one El Saadawi originally intended.

El Saadawi, in a foreword to a later edition, connected the novel's setting to the era of the Suez Crisis, noting her grandmother's observation that "the mayor exploited the peasants to serve the king’s interest, and the king exploited the mayor and the peasants to serve the interests of the British army in the Suez canal".

Written in the 1970s, the novel is also a response to the political and economic shifts under President Anwar El-Sadat, specifically his Infitah ("open door") policy which embraced Western capitalism and aligned Egypt with the United States. El Saadawi has stated that "poverty, American neocolonialism and religious fundamentalism have continued to rise" since the novel's writing, and that visiting her village confirms it still "resembles Zakeya’s village"

== Themes and Analysis ==
=== Patriarchy and feminist critique ===
The novel presents patriarchy not merely as male dominance but as an all-encompassing social system that organizes power across political, economic, religious, and familial domains. This system is embodied by the Mayor, whose authority is propped up by three pillars: the coercive power of the state (Sheikh Zahran), religious ideology (Sheikh Hamzawi), and local tradition/superstition (Haj Ismail). Crucially, the system perpetuates itself by socializing its primary victims. As Alamin M. Mazrui and Judith I. Abala note, using Antonio Gramsci’s theory, "complete hegemony of an oppressive system is attained only when the victims, through a process of cultural and religious socialization, become alienated; they learn to deny their existential being and imbibe the views of their oppressors". This is exemplified by characters like the midwife Om Saber, who performs female genital mutilation and upholds patriarchal honor codes, thereby reproducing patriarchal violence against women from within their own ranks.

The female body is a central battleground in the novel, subjected to various forms of patriarchal discipline and emerging as a site of resistance. The body is controlled through ritualized violence like female genital mutilation, which is described in detail as a process of dehumanization and a preparation for a life of docile sexuality. It is commodified through rape and sexual exploitation, as seen with Nefissa and Zeinab, where sexual violation is an explicit exercise of class and gender power. However, the body also becomes a tool for resistance and rebellion. Fatheya's defiance in adopting the illegitimate child and her subsequent brutal murder positions her body as a site of courageous, if doomed, resistance. Zakeya's ultimate act of killing the Mayor with a hoe, a peasant tool, reclaims the body's agency through violent, cathartic revolt. As Charity Azumi Issaka et al. frame it, the body is not merely docile but is where power is both imposed and contested.

The oppression in Kafr El Teen is intersectional. The Mayor represents a hybrid of local patriarchy and foreign domination, with his English mother and Egyptian father symbolizing the colonial legacy. Morani Kornberg argues that British and later American neocolonial intervention legitimized patriarchal violence and disrupted the peasant family economy, forcing women into exploitative domestic and sexual labor. This creates a hierarchy of oppression: while poor men like Kafrawi are exploited by class, they are also encouraged to exert patriarchal violence over "their" women, who are in turn seen as property belonging to the males of the ruling class. The novel thus presents a socialist feminist critique, showing how capitalism and foreign policy exacerbate patriarchal structures to break down communal, semi-feudal family units.

=== Manipulation of Religion vs. Critique of Islam ===
A major point of scholarly consensus is that El Saadawi distinguishes between Islam as a doctrine and its political manipulation. She argues that "the reasons for the low status of women... are not due to Islam, but rather to certain economic and political forces... making a concerted attempt to misinterpret religion". The novel dramatizes this abuse. For instance, Sheikh Hamzawi teaches his wife Fatheya that the words of prayer "were supposed to be learnt by heart and not understood," a practice that kills critical thinking and ensures blind obedience. Furthermore, Islam is shown fused with pre-Islamic traditions and superstitions, creating a potent tool for control. The Zar exorcism ritual and the villagers' visit to the shrine of Sayada Zainab are depicted not as pure religious expression but as practices manipulated by the ruling class (via Haj Ismail) to mystify oppression and redirect despair. Luma Balaa concludes that the novel critiques a "melange of Islam, traditions, and superstitions" used to oppress women.

=== Political awakening ===
Zakeya's journey is one of political awakening, which is triggered by the systematic destruction of her family and the failure of traditional and religious consolations. Her loss of faith ("Allah alone is not enough") marks a critical rupture. The communal Zar ritual, intended to cure her possession, fails because it seeks to reintegrate her into the very oppressive system causing her pain; instead, it becomes a moment of collective, non-linguistic expression of suffering. Her awakening is described in cognitive terms: "something like thinking, like a tiny point of light appearing in a dark sky... she had started to think". This leads to what Kornberg, drawing on Gramsci, terms the development of "good sense", a critical consciousness that allows her to see the Mayor (not an abstract God) as the source of oppression. Her violent action is thus framed not as madness but as the logical conclusion of her political education.

=== Symbolism: Iron Gate, Urine and Sex ===
El Saadawi employs several potent symbols to interrogate power structures. The Iron Gate of the Mayor's residence is a symbol of patriarchal and class power. It physically and visually represents "the rigidity of the social, political, and economic wall that separates the ruling class and the ruled". More than just a barrier, it embodies the "cold and inhuman character of the patriarchal disposition". From childhood, the peasant girl Nefissa fears that "behind the gate was concealed a great giant, a monstrous devil... who could crush her to death," directly linking the structure to the predatory and destructive potential of the system it protects. For Zakeya, the gate literally blocks access to the Nile and the means of subsistence, becoming a focal point of her oppression and a symbol of the force that "shut[s] out" life and hope.

Urine (nadjis, or religious filth in Islam) is used in three key scenes to question faith and power. Kafrawi's confusion between sweat and urine while laboring expresses his latent doubt about the patriarchal order . The image of bus wheels leaking water "like urine from an old man" symbolizes the peasants' collective anxiety and doubt about religion's role in their oppression as they are taken to a mosque for healing. Most strikingly, the "son of sin" urinating on the Qur’an in Sheikh Hamzawi's lap is a symbolic desecration that rejects the Imam's patriarchal interpretation of religion, suggesting it is the "illegitimate actions" of patriarchs that truly defile doctrine.

Sex is portrayed as a primary instrument of patriarchal power and dehumanization. It manifests as the material power of the ruling class (the Mayor's rape of peasant girls), the physical power of the strong over the weak (Haj Ismail's childhood rape), and the spiritual/religious power of impotent men like Sheikh Hamzawi over their wives. Furthermore, sexual aberrations like bestiality (Kafrawi with his buffalo, Aziza) symbolize the subhumanization of the lower-class male under patriarchy, depicting him as infantilized and trapped. Necrophilia (Sheikh Metwalli) symbolizes the ultimate fate of those who submit to oppressive ideology, a damnation that spares only those, like Fatheya, who die resisting it.

== Publication and reception ==
The Arabic edition was published in Beirut in 1974. The English translation by Sherif Hetata was published by Zed Books in 1985. A German translation followed in 1986. The novel initially received limited critical attention but has been the subject of increasing scholarly analysis since the 1990s.

Early reviews noted its powerful depiction of oppression. Bharati Mukherjee described it as a novel of "betrayal by blind faith," where the true betrayer of the peasantry is "Allah, symbol of all blind religious faith." Scholarly reception has focused on its feminist, socialist, and post-colonial dimensions. Fedwa Malti-Douglas and Georges Tarabishi's early major studies of El Saadawi's work, however, made only passing mention of the novel.

Later scholars have positioned it as a key text in El Saadawi's oeuvre and in Arab feminist literature. Mazrui and Abala called it a "feminist analysis of the gender question within a quasi-Marxist framework." Kornberg situated it within a history of Egyptian revolutionary movements. Balaa analyzed it from a socialist feminist perspective, focusing on the misuse of Islam. Charity Azumi Issaka et al. employed a Foucauldian framework to analyze its discourses of power and resistance.
