= Lisa White =

Lisa White may refer to:

- Lisa J. White, teacher and translator of Arabic
- Lisa White (bowls), New Zealand lawn and indoor bowler
- Lisa Marie White (born 1993), Singaporean model and beauty pageant titleholder
- Lisa White (geologist), an American paleontologist and educator
- Lisa White (politician) (born 1959), American politician
