= Fawwaz Haddad =

Syrian novelist

- Born: فواز حدّاد; 1947 (age 78–79); Damascus, Syria
- Education: Damascus University
- Occupation: novelist
- Notable work: The Unfaithful Translator; God's Soldiers

Fawwaz Haddad (Arabic: فواز حدّاد) (born 1947) is a Syrian novelist.

He was born in Damascus and studied law at Damascus University. He held several jobs before taking up writing full-time. Haddad published his first novel Mosaic, Damascus '39 in 1991. Since then he has written several more, including A Fleeting Scene, The Unfaithful Translator, A Solo Performance on Piano and God's Soldiers. The Unfaithful Translator was nominated for the 2009 Arabic Booker Prize while God's Soldiers was selected for the longlist of the 2011 prize, although it failed to make it on to the eventual shortlist.

Excerpts of Haddad's work have been translated to English and published in Banipal magazine. The Princeton scholar and translator Max Weiss has translated Haddad's 2009 novel Azef Munfared 'ala al-Piano, published as Solo Piano Music by Dar Arab in 2023.

== Works ==
- Mosaic, Damascus '39 (1991)
- Teatro 1949 (1994)
- Al-Risala al-Akhira (The Last Letter) (1994)
- Surat al-Rawee (The Image of the Narrator) (1998)
- Al-Walad al-Jahel (The Ignorant Child), (2000)
- Al-Daghina wa al-Hawa (Rancor and Affection) (2001)
- Mersal al-Gharam (The Love Messenger) (2004)
- Mashhad 'Aber (A Fleeting Scene) (2007)
- Al-Mutarjim al-Kha'in (The Unfaithful Translator) (2008)
- Azef Munfared 'ala al-Piano (A Solo Performance on Piano) (2009) English translation as Solo Piano Music, Dar Arab 2023, ISBN 978-1788710909
- God's Soldiers (2010)
- The Enemy Syrians
