= Woman at Point Zero =

1977 novel by Nawal el Saadawi

- First edition (English)
- Author: Nawal El Saadawi
- Original title: Emra'a enda noktat el sifr
- Translator: Sherif Hetata
- Language: Arabic
- Genre: Creative nonfiction
- Publisher: Beirut: Dar al-Adab (Arabic); London: Zed Books (English)
- Publication date: 1977
- Publication place: Egypt
- English publication date: 1983
- Media type: Print (hardback and paperback)
- Pages: 114
- OCLC: 1260661834

Woman at Point Zero (Arabic: امرأة عند نقطة الصفر, Emra'a enda noktat el sifr) is a novel by Nawal El Saadawi written in 1975 and published in Arabic in 1977. The novel is based on Saadawi's meeting with a female prisoner in Qanatir Prison and is the first-person account of Firdaus, a murderess who has agreed to tell her life story before her execution. The novel explores the themes of women and their place within a patriarchal society.

== Background ==
At the end of 1972 Saadawi was removed from her position as the Director of Health Education and the Editor-in-Chief of Health magazine after the publication of Women and Sex. She began research on neurosis in Egyptian women, during which she met a doctor at Qanatir Prison who talked to her about the inmates, including a female prisoner who had killed a man and had been sentenced to hanging. Saadawi was interested in meeting the woman and visiting the prison, and her colleague arranged for her to conduct her research at Qanatir Prison in the autumn of 1974. Saadawi visited many women in the cell block and in the mental clinic and was able to conduct twenty-one in-depth case studies for her 1976 publication, Women and Neurosis in Egypt, but Firdaus remained "a woman apart." Firdaus was executed in 1974, but she left a lasting impact on Saadawi, who said she could not rest until she had written about Firdaus' story and finished the novel in one week. Saadawi describes Firdaus as a martyr and says she admires her because, "Few people are ready to face death for a principle." Later, when Saadawi was imprisoned in Qanatir in 1981 for political offenses, she reflected that she would find herself looking for Firdaus among the prison population, unable to believe that the woman who had inspired her so much was truly dead.

=== Publication history ===
Initially, Egyptian publishers rejected the book and the first edition was published by Dar al-Adab in Beirut in 1977 (with a second edition in 1979). Woman at Point Zero has subsequently been published in twenty-two languages. The English-language translation was originally published in 1983 by Zed Books in London.

== Plot summary ==
The novel opens with a psychiatrist who is researching inmates at a women's prison. The prison doctor speaks of a woman, Firdaus, who is unlike any of the murderers in the prison. The psychiatrist makes several attempts to speak with her, but Firdaus declines. The day before her execution, Firdaus decides that she wishes to speak with the psychiatrist, and begins to tell the psychiatrist her story.

Firdaus describes a poor childhood in a farming community. She recalls that she was confused by the disparity between her father's actions, such as beating her mother, and his dedication to the Islamic faith. Those days were relatively happy days, as she was sent out to the fields to work and tend the goats. She enjoys the friendship of a boy named Mohammadain, with whom she plays "bride and bridegroom", and describes her first encounters with clitoral stimulation. One day Firdaus's mother sends for a woman with a knife, who mutilates her genitals. From that point on Firdaus is assigned work in the home. Firdaus' uncle begins to take a sexual interest in her.

After the death of her parents, Firdaus is taken in by her uncle, who sends her to primary school. After Firdaus receives her primary school certificate a distance grows between uncle and niece, and her uncle marries and withdraws all affection and attention. Tensions between Firdaus and her aunt build, causing Firdaus to be placed in boarding school. Firdaus falls in love with a female teacher named Miss Iqbal, whom she feels a mutual connection to. Upon graduation, Firdaus' aunt convinces her uncle to arrange her marriage with Sheikh Mahmoud. Mahmoud repulses her—he is forty years older and has a sore on his chin that oozes pus. He stays home all day, micromanaging Firdaus' every action, and begins to physically abuse her.

Firdaus runs away and stops to rest at a coffee shop. The owner, Bayoumi, offers her a place to stay until she finds a job, which she accepts. After several months, Bayoumi becomes violent and beats her savagely. He starts locking her up during the day and allows his friends to abuse, insult, and rape her. Eventually, Firdaus is aided by a female neighbor, who calls a carpenter to open the door, allowing her to escape.

While on the run, Firdaus meets the madame Sharifa Salah el Dine, who takes her into her brothel as a high-class prostitute. She tells Firdaus that all men are the same and that she must be harder than life if she wants to live. In exchange for working in Sharifa's brothel, Firdaus is given beautiful clothes and delicious food, but she has no pleasure in life. One evening she overhears an argument between Sharifa and her pimp, Fawzy, who wants to take Firdaus as his own. They argue, and Fawzy overpowers Sharifa and rapes her. Firdaus realizes that even Sharifa does not have true power and she runs away.

Firdaus is picked up by a stranger who takes her back to his home. He sleeps with her, but he is not as disgusting as the other men she has dealt with in her profession, and after they are done he gives her a 10-pound note. Firdaus realizes that she can exert her power over men by rejecting them, and can force men to yield to her will by naming her own price; she gains self-confidence and soon becomes a wealthy and highly sought prostitute. She employs a cook and an assistant, works whatever hours she wishes, and cultivates powerful friendships. One day, her friend Di'aa tells her she is not respectable. This insult has a jarring and immediate impact on Firdaus, who comes to realize that she can no longer work as a prostitute.

Firdaus takes a job at a local office and refuses to offer her body to the higher officials for promotions or raises. Although she believes that her new job will bring respect, she makes significantly less money than when working as a prostitute, and lives in squalid conditions. Furthermore, her office job gives her little autonomy or freedom. She eventually falls in love with Ibrahim, a coworker and revolutionary chairman, with whom she develops a deep emotional connection. But when Ibrahim announces his engagement to the chairman's daughter, which has clearly been engineered to help his career, Firdaus realizes he does not reciprocate her feelings and only used her for sex.

Crushed and disillusioned, Firdaus returns to prostitution, and once again amasses great wealth and becomes highly influential. Her success attracts the attention of the pimp Marzouk, who has many political connections and threatens her with police action. He repeatedly beats Firdaus and forces her to give him larger percentages of her earnings. Firdaus decides to leave and take up another job, but Marzouk blocks her way and tells her she can never leave. When he pulls a knife, Firdaus takes it and stabs him to death.

High with the sense of her new freedom, Firdaus walks the streets until she is picked up by a prince, whom she refuses until he agrees to her price of 3,000 pounds. As soon as the transaction is over, she tells him that she killed a man. He does not believe her, but she scares him to the point that he is convinced. The prince has her arrested and Firdaus is sentenced to death.

As Firdaus finishes her story, armed policemen take her to be executed, and the psychiatrist sits, stunned, and realizes that Firdaus is more courageous than her.

== Literary significance and reception ==
Critics have praised Saadawi for exposing the subjugation of women in Middle Eastern societies, but Wen-Chin Ouyang notes that Saadawi's work and its popularity in Western countries is regarded with suspicion by Arab critics, who contend that Saadawi perpetuates negative Western stereotypes of Arab-Islamic male violence and domination and that her work has been neglected due to its literary shortcomings.

== Addiitonal sources ==
- MUTUNDA, SYLVESTER. "Free at Last: A Feminist Insight Into Beyala’s The Sun Hath Looked Upon Me and EL Saadawi’s Woman At Point Zero." Research Journal of English Language and Literature (RJELAL) 4, no. 2 (2016): 713-721.
