= Max Weiss (scholar) =

American scholar and translator

Max Weiss is an American scholar and translator, specialising in the culture and history of the Middle East. He studied biology and history at University of California, Berkeley before moving on to Stanford University, where he completed his PhD in modern Middle Eastern history in 2007. He joined the faculty of Princeton University in 2010.

Weiss is the author of In the Shadow of Sectarianism: Law, Shi'ism and the Making of Modern Lebanon (2010) and Revolutions Aesthetic: A Cultural History of Ba‘thist Syria (2022). He is also a noted translator of contemporary Arabic literature into English. His translation of Abbas Beydoun's novel Blood Test won the Arkansas Arabic Translation Award.

Weiss is also a two-time fellow of the Harvard Society of Fellows.

== Books ==
=== As author ===
- In the Shadow of Sectarianism: Law, Shi'ism and the Making of Modern Lebanon (Harvard University Press, 2010)
- Revolutions Aesthetic: A Cultural History of Ba‘thist Syria (Stanford University Press, 2022)

=== As translator ===
- B as in Beirut by Iman Humaydan Younes
- Blood Test by Abbas Beydoun
- A Tunisian Tale by Hassouna Mosbahi
- The Silence and the Roar by Nihad Sirees
- States of Passion by Nihad Sirees
- The Beekeeper: Rescuing the Stolen Women of Iraq by Dunya Mikhail
- work by Fawwaz Haddad (forthcoming)

== See also ==
- List of Arabic-English translators
