= Daniel Newman (academic) =

British writer, scholar and translator (born 1963)

- Born: Daniel Lawrence Newman; 1963
- Died: March 2026 (aged 62–63)
- Education: SOAS, University of London
- Occupations: Writer, translator and professor (University of Durham)
- Writing career
- Subject: Arabic literature
- Notable awards: Republic of Tunisia International Prize for Islamic Studies
- Website: eatlikeasultan.com

Daniel Lawrence Newman (1963 – March 2026) was a British writer, scholar and translator of Arabic literature. He served as a special advisor to the Islamic Criminal Justice Project at the Centre for Criminal Law & Justice, Durham Law School, and previously as a member of council at the British Society for Middle Eastern Studies from 2008 to 2012.

== Academic career ==
Newman received his doctorate from the School of Oriental and African Studies (SOAS), University of London.

Newman's research in Arabic studies centered on linguistics (phonetics and dialectology) and literature. He was a specialist on the 19th-century Nahda (Arab Renaissance) movement in Egypt and Tunisia and published extensively on this topic. He was also involved in a long-term project on mediaeval Arabic erotic literature which resulted in the edition and translation of original manuscripts.

Newman translated several works of Arabic literature, both from the pre-modern and modern era. These include Takhlis al-Ibriz fi Talkhis Bariz by Rifa'a al-Tahtawi (under the title An Imam in Paris) and Modern Arabic Short Stories. In 2008, he was the co-recipient of the Republic of Tunisia International Prize for Islamic Studies for the book Muslim Women in Law and Society.

Since 2011, Newman had been cited as an expert on the Middle East for Al Jazeera and the Voice of America, among other outlets.

== Books ==
=== Author ===
- The Exile’s Cookbook: Medieval Gastronomic Treasures from al-Andalus & North Africa, London: Saqi Books, 2023.
- The Sultan’s Feast: A Fifteenth-Century Egyptian Cookbook, London: Saqi Books, 2020.
- The Sultan’s Sex Potions: Arab Aphrodisiacs in the Middle Ages, Saqi Books, 2014.
- A to Z of Arabic-English-Arabic Translation, London: Saqi Books, 2013 (co-authored with R. Husni).
- Modern Arabic Short Stories: A Bilingual Reader - Twelve Stories by Contemporary Masters from Morocco to Iraq, London: Saqi Books, 2008 (co-authored with R. Husni).
- Arabic-English Thematic Lexicon, Routledge, 2007.
- Muslim Women in Law and Society: Annotated translation of al-Tahir al-Haddad's Imra 'tuna fi 'l-sharia wa 'l-mujtama, with an introduction, Routledge, 2007 (co-authored with R. Husni).
- An Imam in Paris: Al-Tahtawi's Visit to France (1826–1831), London: Saqi Books, 2004 (2nd revised edition 2011).
- Elsevier’s Dictionary of Ports and Shipping (English, French, Spanish, Italian, Portuguese, Dutch, German), Amsterdam: Elsevier, 1993 (co-authored with J. Van der Tuin).

=== Editor ===
- Proceedings of the 1st Annual International Conference on Language, Literature & Linguistics (L3 2012), Singapore, 2012.
- Maritime Terminology: Issues in Communication and Translation. Proceedings of the First International Conference on Maritime Terminology, Brussels, 1999 (with M. Van Campenhoudt).

== See also ==
- List of Arabic-English translators
