= Sahar Mandour =

Lebanese-Egyptian novelist

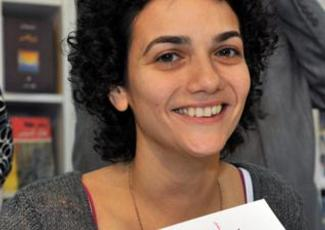
Sahar Mandour

Sahar Mandour (born 1977) is a Lebanese-Egyptian novelist.

== Life ==
Sahar Mandour was born in Beirut to a Lebanese mother and Egyptian father. She studied psychology at Saint Joseph University in Beirut, before becoming a journalist.

Mandour's novel 32 portrayed female friendships in Beirut, caught in "coexistence between bombs and parties".

== Works ==
- sa’arsum najma ‘ala jabīn fīyenā [I'll Draw a Star on Vienna's Forehead], Beirut, 2007.
- ḥubb beirūtī [A Beiruti Love], 2009.
- 32, 2010. Translated from the Arabic as 32 by Nicole Fares, 2016.
- mīnā [Mina], 2012.
