= Abbas Beydoun =

Lebanese poet, novelist, and journalist

Abbas Beydoun (born 1945) is a Lebanese poet, novelist and journalist. His poems in Arabic have garnered widespread acclaim and have been translated into multiple languages.

== Biography ==
Beydoun was born in the village of Sur near Tyre in southern Lebanon. His father was a teacher. Beydoun studied at the Lebanese University in Beirut and the Sorbonne in Paris. He was involved in left-wing politics and spent time in jail as a young man in 1968 and 1982.

== Literary Career ==
Since becoming a full-time writer, he has published 18 volumes of poetry, among them Hujurat, Li Mareedin Huwa al-Amal, and Ashiqa'a Nadamuna. His work has been translated into all the major European languages, and English translations of his poetry have appeared in several issues of Banipal magazine. Beydoun has mentioned Pierre Jean Jouve and Yannis Ritsos among his key poetic influences.

He also published a novel called Tahlil damm in 2002. The English translation by Max Weiss, titled Blood Test, won the Arkansas Arabic Translation Award in 2008.

Since 1997, Beydoun has been cultural editor of the Beiruti newspaper As-Safir. In 2019, Beydoun was a contributor to A New Divan: A Lyrical Dialogue Between East and West ISBN 9781909942288.

His 2021 novel Boxes of Desire, published by Dar al-Ain, was longlisted for the International Prize for Arabic Fiction.

== Awards and honors ==
- 2017 Sheikh Zayed Book Award in "Literature" for Khareef al Bara’a (The Autumn of Innocence)
- 2021 nomination for the Arabic Booker Prize for Boxes of Desire
