= Michelle Hartman (translator) =

Michelle Hartman is an academic and translator. She obtained a BA from Columbia College in 1993 and a DPhil from Oxford University in 1998. She is currently a professor of Arabic Literature at the Institute of Islamic Studies, McGill University. She is the author of a number of academic papers and several monographs including Breaking Broken English: Black Arab Literary Solidarities and the Politics of Language, which won the College Language Association award for creative scholarship in 2020. She is also a translator of contemporary Arabic literature, and has translated a short story collection, Beirut Noir and more than twelve novels including Iman Humaydan Younes’s Wild Mulberries, Other Lives, The Weight of Paradise, and Songs For Darkness, Alexandra Chreiteh's Always Coca-Cola and Ali and His Russian Mother, Shahla Ujayli's Summer with the Enemy and A Sky So Close to Us and Jana Elhassan's The Ninety-Ninth Floor and All the Women Inside Me, among others. Wild Mulberries was shortlisted for the 2009 Saif Ghobash Banipal Prize for Arabic Literary Translation. She also co-translated Memoirs of a Militant, Without, and A Long Walk from Gaza in 2024.

== See also ==
- List of Arabic to English translators
