= Paula Haydar =

American academic and translator (born 1965)

- Born: 1965 (age 60–61)
- Citizenship: United States
- Occupations: Assistant professor, Arabic language translator
- Known for: Literary translation
- Spouse: Adnan Haydar

Academic background
- Education: 1987 BA in physics, 1991 M.Ed, University of Massachusetts Amherst; 1998 MFA, University of Arkansas; 2014 PhD, University of Arkansas
- Alma mater: University of Arkansas

Academic work
- Discipline: Comparative literature; Literary translation

Paula Haydar (born 1965) is an American academic and translator. She has a PhD in Comparative literature and an MFA in Literary translation. She won an Arkansas Arabic Translation Prize for her translation of Elias Khoury's The Kingdom of Strangers. Her work has appeared in Banipal magazine and she has translated the literary work of Jabbour Douaihy, Rachid Al-Daif, and others.

== Education ==
Haydar obtained a bachelor's degree in physics in 1987 and an M.Ed from the University of Massachusetts Amherst in 1991. She then earned a MFA in literary translation from the University of Arkansas in 1998. She received a PhD, from the University of Arkansas in 2014.

== Career ==
Haydar taught Arabic at the University of Massachusetts before joining the faculty at the university of Arkansas in 2006. She works in the Department of World Languages, Literatures, and Cultures as an Assistant Professor of Arabic.

She won the Arkansas Arabic Translation Prize for her translation of Elias Khoury's The Kingdom of Strangers. Her work has appeared in two issues of Banipal magazine (1998, 2008). Paula Haydar's English translation of the novel June Rain earned her second place for the 2014 Saif Ghobash Banipal Prize. The Beirut Daily Star also recognized the translation in a year-end book review list of the six Top Middle East Novels of 2014 in translation.

Haydar has translated novels, short stories, and poetry from Arabic to English. Her book length translations include:

- The Kingdom of Strangers by Elias Khoury (1996)
- Learning English by Rachid Al-Daif (1998)
- This Side of Innocence by Rachid Al-Daif (2001)
- June Rain by Jabbour Douaihy (2006)
- Touch by Adania Shibli(2013)(2007)
- The End of Spring by Sahar Khalifeh(2008)
- City Gates by Elias Khoury (also translated as Gates of the City) (2007)
- The Journey of Little Gandhi, by Elias Khoury (2009)

== Personal life ==
She is married to fellow academic Adnan Haydar and lives in Fayetteville, Arkansas. Their son Fuad "Kikko" Haydar played basketball for the Arkansas Razorbacks.

== See also ==
- List of Arabic-English translators
