= Mohammed Albakry =

Egyptian-American academic

Mohammed A. Albakry is an Egyptian-American academic and translator of contemporary Arabic literature. He is a professor at Middle Tennessee State University. His translations of Arabic fiction appeared in various publications, and some of his translations of Egyptian drama have been performed in major U.S cities including theaters in New York, Boston, Nashville, and Chicago. He occasionally contributes journalistic pieces to The Tennessean newspaper, and other print and online periodicals.

== See also ==
- List of Arabic-English translators
