= Iman Humaydan Younes =

Lebanese writer (born 1956)

Iman Humaydan (born 1956) is a Lebanese writer, researcher and creative writing professor at Saint-Denis Paris 8 University in France. She was born in the Mount Lebanon governorate in 1956. She studied sociology and Anthropology at the American University in Beirut. Between 2002 and 2006, she conducted a profound research on the Families of the Disappeared persons during the Lebanese civil war. Her research was titled " Neither Here Nor There.. Families of the Disappeared in Lebanon", and was the first in kind in the Arab World. She has published four novels:

- B as in Beirut (translated by Max Weiss)
- Wild Mulberries (translated by Michelle Hartman)
- Other Lives (translated by Michelle Hartman, 2014 ISBN 978-1566569620)
- “The Weight of Paradise" (translated by Michelle Hartman, 2016)

Humaydan's novels were translated into English (Interlink Books USA), into French (Verticales, France), and into German (Lenos verlag): some of her work came out in Dutch, Italian, Armenian and Georgian.

In 2011, and in 2014, she participated in the International Writing Program's Fall Residency at the University of Iowa in Iowa City, IA. In her work, both literary and academic, Humaydan is concerned with memories of war, and lives of women. In 2016, her fourth novel Weight of Paradise was awarded Katara Prize.

Iman Humaydan is a co founder of Pen Lebanon and its current president. She is also a board member in Pen International.
