= A Long Walk from Gaza =

2024 novel by Asmaa Alatawna

- English-language cover
- Author: Asmaa Alatawna
- Language: Arabic
- Publisher: Dar al Saqi
- Publication date: 2019
- Publication place: Beirut
- Pages: 170
- ISBN: 9786140321007

A Long Walk from Gaza (Arabic: صورة مفقودة) is a 2019 novel by Asmaa Alatawna. It was translated into English by Caline Nasrallah and Michelle Hartman, and published by Interlink Books on May 7, 2024. It follows a girl as she travels from Gaza to Europe.

== Critical reception ==
Kirkus Reviews called the book "A tale of trauma" that provides "a timely look at a brutal reality."

Novels Alive, giving it four stars, wrote that the book powerfully, sharply criticizes patriarchy in addition to occupation under Israel and observes how Palestinian girls are challenged by both while they grow up: "At heart, A Long Walk from Gaza is a tale of freedom. Each of the characters is psychically wounded by their circumstances and each resists in their own way."

The New Arab named it in a list of 10 powerful books by Palestinian writers, stating that "This fiercely feminist novel demonstrates how patriarchy, trauma, violence and Israel’s occupation and persecution of Gazans collide, the most heavily affected being young women."
