= Osman Nusairi =

Osman Nusairi is a playwright and award-winning translator of Sudanese origin. He has translated two Arabic novels into English - Nawal el-Saadawi's Two Women in One (1985; co-translator with Jana Gough) and Reem Bassiouney's The Pistachio Seller (2009). The latter work won the Arkansas Arabic Translation Award in 2009.

He worked as a theatre director in the Sudanese National Theatre and as a Lecturer of Drama at Khartoum Institute of Music and Drama in 1978, having studied Theatre Direction at East 15 Acting School and University College, Cardiff University.

== Major translations ==
- The Strong Breed, Wole Soyinka (1979)
- The Great Sermon Handicap, P.G. Wodehouse (1984)
- The Arab Horse (for Citibank), 1984
- Two Women in One, Nawal el-Saadawi 1986
- Lawless World, Philippe Sandes (2006)
- The Pistachio Seller, Reem Bassiouney (2009)
- The Rule of Law, Lord Thomas Bingham (2010)
- Criminal Law Reform in Sudan (Jointly)- Redress 2011
- Sudan Arabic Texts (2011)
- Voiceover translations for the Channel 4 documentary, The Holy War of Words.

== Plays ==
=== Broadcast by the BBC World Service in English ===
- Life and Times of Christopher Abdullah
- The Town Crier
- The Village Teacher
- The Intermediate Technologist
- Gordon of Khartoum
- The Desert Trek of Re-education

=== Stage plays ===
- Board of Discipline (Khartoum performance)
- Mahmood (UK performances)
- An Evening With The Ancestors (UK performances)
- Refugees – live performance at City Hall as part of the London Refugee Housing Conference 2002

== See also ==
- List of Arabic-to-English translators
