= Nicole Fares =

Lebanese academic and translator

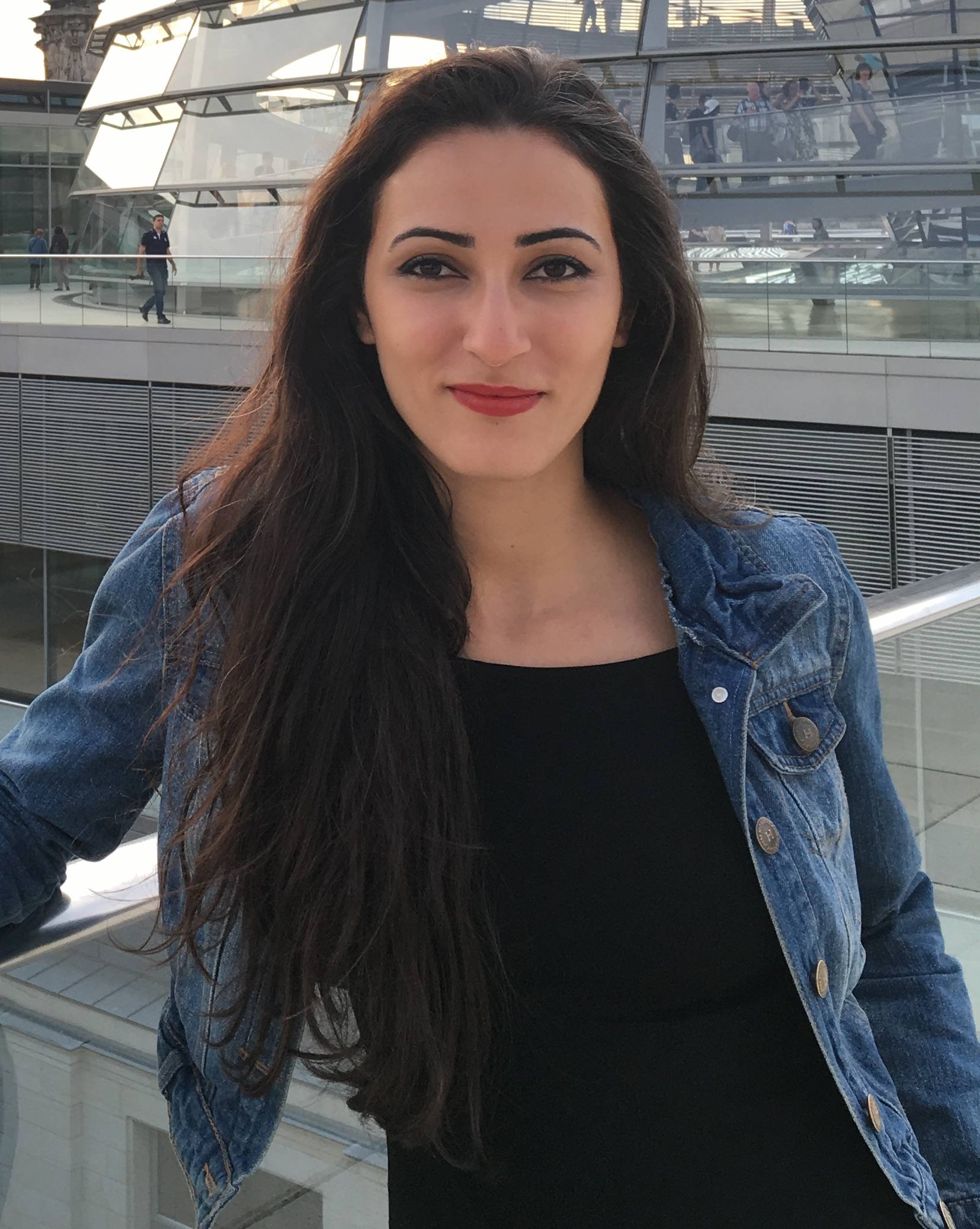
Nicole Fares 2016 in Berlin

Nicole Fares is a Lebanese academic and translator. She obtained a bachelor's degree in translation and interpretation from AUST in Beirut. She then obtained an M.F.A in literary translation and a Ph.D. in comparative literature and cultural studies. from the University of Arkansas.

Fares has translated novels, short stories, and poetry from Arabic to English. Her book length translations include:

- 32, by Sahar Mandour. Longlisted for the Banipal Prize for Arabic Literary Translation, 2016.
- Jerusalem Stands Alone, by Mahmoud Shukair.
- No One May Remain, by Haitham Hussein.
- Vienna, by Sahar Mandour.
- From Amuda to Amuda, by Siruan H. Hussein.
- In Gaddafi's Clutches, by Ahmed Vall Dine.

Her translations have also appeared in World Literature Today (2014), Jadaliyya (2013), Alchemy Journal of Translation (2013), and others. Her contributions on literature theory and cultural studies include Brave New World: Critical Insights (Salem Press, 2014). and Inclusion and Exclusion: Arab Immigrants and Belonging in Europe, AUC Press, Constructions of Masculinity in the Middle East and North Africa: Literature, Film, and National Discourse. Sep. 2020. Print.

== See also ==
- List of Arabic-English translators
