= A Tunisian Tale =

2007 book by Hassouna Mosbahi

A Tunisian tale (Arabic: حكاية تونسية) is a novel by Hassouna Mosbahi. It was published in 2007 and was the first book by the author to be translated in English. The English translation by Max Weiss was published in 2012.

== Overview ==
A Tunisian Tale is Mosbahi's fifth novel. It revolves around the story of a crime committed by a twenty-year-old son, outraged by injustice and rumors that people have spread about his mother. It explores themes of sexuality and honor in Arab societies. It captures the hopelessness of people who have fled their home, coming to suburban areas in hope of a better life. ATunisian Tale can be seen as a psychological thriller or a sample of “North African Noir”. Mosbahi won the Mohamed Zefzef Prize for ATunisian tale.

== Plot summary ==
The story alternates between a mother and her son's point of view. Each chapter follows one's recollection of events as it happened from childhood to the end. The mother (Najma) recalls her childhood in a remote village. She describes the freedom and happiness she enjoyed there as a child but also remembers how things changed while she was growing up and how she found herself like a prisoner as a teenager in the "dirt-poor village".

Finally, she decides to marry "Mansour" in order to get away from the village. Her expectations of a "life that was all softness and comfort and convenience" breaks down as they move to "M slum", A suburban slum filled with "ne’er-do-wells". Najma again feels like a prisoner as she is restrained in her life as she cannot go out of her house without neighbors and strangers harassing her. Najma thinks that the reason for this harassment is jealousy and evil heartedness of people in M slum. Meanwhile, Mansour is working most of the time and does not pay her the attention she wants.

Najma tried to regain her freedom and happiness by going to the town and walking on the streets and visiting the cafes. At this point one of the infamous thugs in the M slum was following her around, trying to make her fall for him. But when his efforts came to nothing, he started to threaten and harass Najma, until one day when she tells the story to her husband during a fight. Mansour, being a conservative and fearful person panics, and Najma calls him a coward for not being able to defend her. The next day, Mansour goes to the thug and starts threatening him, but the thug beats him up violently, with Alaa al-Din (his son) watching. after this, Mansour becomes extremely ill and dies afterwards.

This incident causes Alaa al-Din to develop resentments for her mother. People in the M slum spread rumors about Najma as she tries to live her life regardless of other's opinion. One day, while working in a cafe, Alaa al-Din is confronted with the thug who, in his opinion, killed his father. he panics and breaks some glasses, as the thug and his friends laugh and mock him. He quits his job and gets depressed and paranoid. Finally one day, Alaa al-Din decides to kill her mother. He tells her that they are going to a wedding, and takes her to somewhere outside the town and after murdering her, burns the body. A Tunisian Tale is narrated by a mother (who is already dead) and her son who is on the death row. The second part of the novel alternates between the real events that happens to Ala al-din and her mother and fables of Alaa al-Din.
