= Nihad Sirees =

Syrian writer

Nihad Sirees (Arabic: نهاد سيريس; born 1950, Aleppo, Syria) is a Syrian writer of contemporary fiction and screenwriter. He was born in the northern Syrian metropolis Aleppo and studied engineering in Bulgaria. Sirees emerged as a fiction writer in the 1980s, and has written novels, plays, and scripts for TV dramas. Among his notable works are the historical novel The North Winds and the TV series The Silk Market, which has been translated for screening into English, Persian and German. He also wrote a TV series about the Lebanese writer Kahlil Gibran.

His 2004 novel The Silence and the Roar was banned in Syria, and has been translated into German, French and English. His second novel States of Passion, translated by Max Weiss, was published by Pushkin Press in 2018. Most of his writings are inspired by Aleppo, its history and the social relations that govern its inhabitants, and he used the Aleppo dialect of Syrian Arabic in Syrian drama. In the wake of the Arab Spring, Sirees was targeted for heightened surveillance by the Syrian government, and went into exile in 2012. Initially having fled to Egypt, he later moved to Berlin, Germany.

== Selected works ==
- Al Samt Wal Sakhab (2004), The Silence and the Roar (2013). The Other Press, translated by Max Weiss, ISBN 9781590516454
- States of Passion, (2018) translated by Max Weiss, London, U.K.: Pushkin Press, ISBN 9781782273479

== See also ==
- Syrian literature
