= Zahra Jishi =

Lebanese-American translator

Zahra Jishi is a Lebanese-American translator of Arabic literature. Among her translations are:

- Where Prophets Are Killed, a collection of three novellas by Syrian-American author Lotfi Hadad. Co-translator: Reem Salem.
- The World Through the Eyes of Angels, a novel by the Iraqi-American writer Mahmoud Saeed. Co-translators: Samuel Salter and Rafah Abuinnab.

Jishi, Salter, and Abuinnab won the 2010 Arkansas Arabic Translation Award for their translation of Angels.

== See also ==
- List of Arabic English translators
