= Hassouna Mosbahi =

Tunisian writer (1950–2025)

- حسونة المصباحي
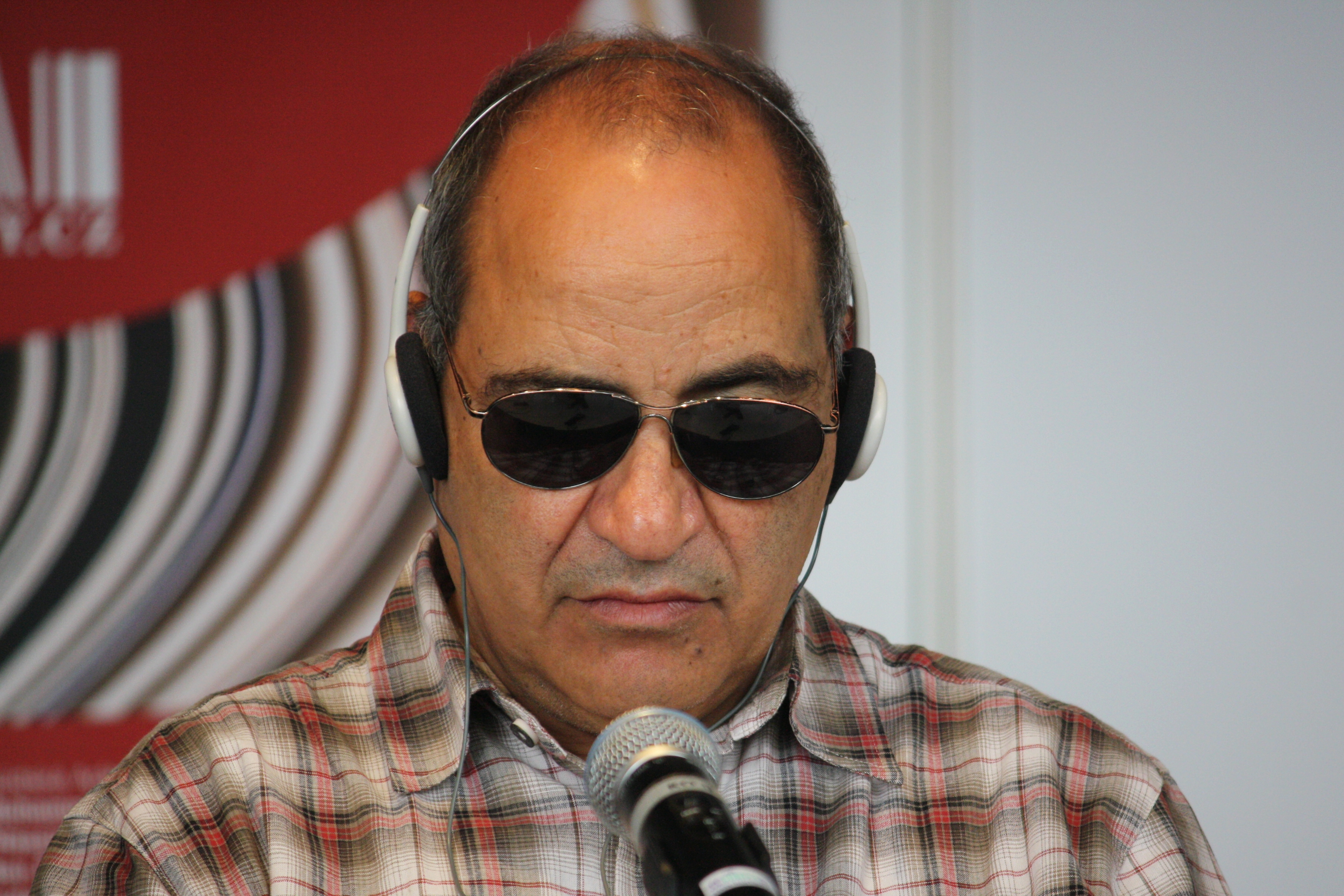
- Mosbahi in 2011
- Born: 1950; Dhehibat, French protectorate of Tunisia
- Died: 4 June 2025 (aged 75)
- Citizenship: Tunisian
- Occupation: Author

Hassouna Mosbahi (Arabic: حسونة المصباحي; 1950 – 4 June 2025) was a Tunisian author, literary critic and freelance journalist.

== Life and career ==
Hassouna Mosbahi was born in 1950 in the village of Dhehibat in the governorate of Kairouan, Tunisia, and studied French at the Tunis University.

He suffered persecution at the hands of the government of Habib Bourguiba and so sought refuge in Europe, moving to Munich, Germany in 1985. He returned to Tunisia in 2004.

He published four collections of short stories and six novels and has been translated into German and English. He also published dozens of translations of French literary works into Arabic.

His work won several literary prizes, including the Munich Fiction Prize (for the German translation of his novel Tarshish Hallucination), and the 2016 Mohamed Zefzef Prize for Fiction (for his novel A Tunisian Tale). In 2010 he refused a "Judges' Choice" prize from the Prix Littéraires COMAR D’OR for his novel Ramād al-ḥayāh (Ashes of life), for what he described as "reasons he will keep to himself".

Mosbahi lived in Hammamat, Tunisia. He died on 4 June 2025, at the age of 75.

== Political views ==
Mosbahi was vocal in his opposition to the 2011 Tunisian revolution in interviews and speeches, as well as in his 2015 novel ʼAšwāk wa-yāsamīn (Thorns and Jasmine). This political stance had been sharply criticized.

== Prizes ==
- Toucan Fiction Prize in Munich, 2000, for German translation of Halwasāt Taršīš (Tarshish Hallucination)
- Mohamed Zefzef Prize for Fiction, 2016
- Prix Littéraires COMAR D’OR, "Judges' Choice", 2010 (Refused by author)

== Selected works ==
=== Novels ===
- Miḥan tūnisiyya (Tunisian afflictions), 2017
- Baḥṯan ʻan al-saʻāda (Searching for happiness), 2017
- ʼAšwāk wa-yāsamīn (Thorns and jasmine), 2015
- La nasbahou fi enahri maratayn, 2020
- Yatīm al-dahr (Orphan of an era), 2012
- Ramād al-ḥayāh (Ashes of life), 2009
- Hikāyat tūnisiyya (A Tunisian tale), 2008. English translation 2012 by Max Weiss.
- Nuwwārat al-diflā (Oleander), 2004. German translation (Der grüne Esel) 2013 by Regina Karachouli.
- Wadāʻan Rawzālī (A farewell to Rosalie), 2001. German translation (Adieu Rosalie) 2004 by Erdmute Heller.
- al-ʼAḵirūn (The Others), 1998
- Halwasāt Taršīš (Tarshish hallucination), 1995. German translation (Rückkehr nach Tarschisch) by Regina Karachouli.

=== Short stories ===
- Haḏayān fī al-ṣaḥrāʼ (Dessert mirages), 2014
- al-Sulaḥfāh (The Tortoise), 1997, 2000
- Hikāyat junūn ibnat ʻammī Hanniya (A story of my cousin Hanniya's insanity), 1986
- Laylat al-ḡurabāʼ (Night of strangers), 1997
