= Stuart A. Hancox =

Stuart Hancox is a literary translator and gained an MFA in Literary Translation and Creative Writing from the University of Arkansas at Fayetteville. He was also a doctoral candidate in comparative literature at UArk. Since 2003, he has been working as a User Interface specialist in New York City.

Hancox won the University of Arkansas Press Award for his translation of Improvisations on a Missing String by the Lebanese writer Nazik Saba Yared. He also won the Gary Wilson Award in Translation from the University of Arkansas Press in 1995 and 1996.

== See also ==
- List of Arabic-English translators
