= Rashid Al-Daif =

Lebanese author

Rashid El Daif (Arabic: رشيد الضيف) (or Rasheed Al-Daif, Rachid El-Daïf, Rachid Al-Daif) (born 6 August 1945) is a Lebanese poet and novelist. He has been translated into 14 languages. He has been referred to as "the Arab world's answer to Italo Calvino or Umberto Eco".

== Early life and education ==
Rashid El Daif was born into a Christian Maronite family of eight children in Zgharta, Lebanon, in 1945. He studied in his village until high school. Then, he transferred to a government high school in Tripoli, Lebanon which only offered a philosophy degree, despite his penchant for science. After finishing high school, in 1965, he enrolled at the Lebanese University in Beirut in the Department of Arabic Letters. He became well-trained in classical Arabic literature and went to France in 1971 to continue his education.

While in France, he received Ph.D. in Modern Letters (Doctorat in Lettres Modernes) from University of Paris III, known as Sorbonne Nouvelle University Paris 3 on the theory of modern criticism applied to Unshūdat almaṭar, a collection of poems by Badr Shakir al-Sayyab, which was supervised by the distinguished Arabist André Miquel.

From 1972 to 1974, he worked as a teacher of Arabic for foreigners at University of Paris III.

In 1978, he received a Master of Advanced Studies, known in French as a Diplôme d'études approfondies, in linguistics at the University of Paris V, commonly known as “the Sorbonne” in preparation for a second doctoral thesis on diglossia in the Arab countries.

== Background and awards ==
From 1974 to 2008, El Daif worked as an assistant professor at the Lebanese University in the Department of Arabic language and literature. He was a visiting professor at the University of Toulouse, France in 1999. From 2008 to 2013, he was an adjunct professor at the Lebanese American University (LAU). Since 2012, he has served a professor of Arabic creative writing at The American University of Beirut (AUB).

El Daif has received dozens of invitations to speak about his novels from all over the world including in the Netherlands, Japan, Germany, France, the United States.

El-Daif’s work has attracted numerous critical books and articles including by Samira Aghacy, Stefan G. Meyer, Ken Seigneurie, Assaad Khairallah, Paul Starkey, Mona Takieddine Amyuni, Edgar Weber and others. Several university dissertations have also been written on El Daif’s novels. El Daif has also gone on to supervise the publication of at least five novels from his students and in 2018 edited and published a collection of his student's work titled tahīya' li-dawī ḥaḍurī (Get Ready for the Rumble of my Presence).

== Work ==
Allied with the progressive Lebanese left and in particular with the Communist Party, in the 70s, he campaigned resolutely for the Palestinian cause. During the war years, he took refuge on the west side of Beirut, where he has resided since. In 1979, he witnessed the Mossad assassination of Ali Hassan Salameh which took place in front of the building he was living in and could have lost his life. The experience is documented in his novel fusha mustahadafa bayn al nas wa al-nom.

During his engagement with Marxism, he saw himself and his friends as "makers" of history. Yet, he was quickly disappointed. By the end of 1978, Lebanese had already retreated into the divisions of ideological camps, and he left and isolated himself. He reached the conclusion that this chaotic reality cannot be seized by means of any of the political or philosophical grand narratives.

As El Daif explains in a 2007 interview with Rita Sakr: “When Marxism failed as a theoretical tool for systematically interpreting the world, I lost my belief in all such systems of thought and sought refuge in writing. I felt that the world cannot be explained but it can only be told. I realized that only literature can tell the world.”

His 1995 novel Azizi as-sayyid Kawabata, translated in English by Paul Starkey, is often taught as a seminal text on Lebanon’s civil war. In the introduction of the translation, Margaret Drabble writes “It enlarges our understanding and deserves to take its place with other memorable accounts of the courage and complexities of civil war, such as Orwell’s Homage to Catalonia.” Drabble further pays tribute to her long-standing friendship to El Daif and his ex-wife in her contribution to the 2006 book Lebanon, Lebanon.

In 2003, El Daif visited Germany for six weeks under the auspices of the prestigious Berlin-Based “West-Eastern Divan” which initiated an author exchange between El Daif from Beirut and Joachim Helfer from Berlin. Two books resulted from the encounter: El Daif’s Awdat al-almani ila rushdih (The German’s Return to His Senses, 2005) and Helfer’s response Die Verschwulung der Welt (The Queering of the World, 2006). Both texts caused a heated debate at the time of their publication.

A decade later, in 2015, their candid exchange in English translation was published with additional critical essays under the title What Makes A Man? Sex Talk between Beirut and Berlin.

Over the span of three decades, el Daif's prolific oeuvre has encompassed the Lebanese civil war (extensively), marital relations and sexual violence, homosexuality, anti-black racism, historical fiction including on the Arab Nahda and Jurji Zaydan and two autobiographies. Since 2019, Rachid el Daif's work has focused on Classical Arabic heritage, mythology and fairytales. He has published two novels on the subject.

== Bibliography ==
Novels

- 1982, Unsi yalhu ma’a rita: kitab al-baligin, (Unsi is Playing with Rita: A Book for Adults), al-Mu’assasa l-Jami’iyya li-l-dirasat wa-l-nasr, Beirut.
- 1983, Al-Mustabidd, (The Tyrant), Dar ab’ad, Beirut. Reprint: Riad El-Rayyes Books, 2001.
- 1986, Fusha mustahdafa bayna l-nu’as wa-l-nawm, Mukhtarat, Beirut. Reprint: Riad El-Rayyes Books 2001.

Translated into French by Luc Barbulesco and Philippe Cardinal under the title Passage au Crepuscule, Actes Sud, 1992.
Also translated into English by Nirvana Tannuki under the title Passage to Dusk, Austin: Center for Middle Eastern Studies, University of Texas at Austin, 2001. ISBN 978-0-292-70507-4

- 1987, Ahlu z-zill, (Dwellers of the Shade), Mukhtarat, Beirut. Reprint: Riad El-Rayyes Books 2001.

Translated into French under the title L'Insolence Du Serpent...ou les creatures de l’ombre by Edgard Weber. AMAM, Toulouse, 1997.

- 1989, Taqaniyyaatu l-bu’s, Technicalities of Wretchedness, Mukhtarat, Beirut. Reprint: Riad El-Rayyes Books 2001.
- 1991, Ghaflat al-Turab, A Lapse of the Earth, Mukhtarat, Beirut. Reprint: Riad El-Rayyes Books 2001
- 1995, Azizi as-sayyid Kawabata, Mukhtarat, Beirut. Reprint: Riad El-Rayyes Books 2001

Translated into the following eight European languages: English, French, Italian, German, Spanish, Swedish, Polish, and Dutch.
German translation: Hartmut Fahndrich, Lieber Herr Kawabata. Basel, Lenos 1998.
English Translation: Paul Starkey, Dear Mr. Kawabata. London: Quartet Books, 1999; reprinted by Interlink Books, U.S.A., 2000.
Polish Translation, Ewa-Machut-Mendecka, Kochany Panie Kawabato, Wydawnictwo Akademickie Dialog, 1998

- 1997, Nahiyat al-bara’a, al-Masar, Beirut.

Translated into English under the title This Side of Innocence by Paula Haydar. Interlink Books, 2001.

- 1998, Lernin Inglish, (Learning English), al-Nahar, Beirut. Reprint: Riad El-Rayyes, Beirut, 2005.

Translated into French under the title Learning English by Yves Gonzalez-Quijano. Paris: Actes Sud, September 2001.

- 2001, Tistifil Meryl Streep (Meryl Streep Can Suit Herself), Riad El-Rayyes Books, Beirut.

Translated into Italian under the title E CHI SE NE FREGA DI MERYL STREEP by Palma D'Amico. Rome: Jouvence, 2003.
Also translated into French under the title Qu'elle au Diable Meryl Streep by Edgard Weber. Paris: Actes-Sud, 2004
Also translated into Greek. Athens: Kedros, 2006.
Also translated into English under the title Who's Afraid of Meryl Streep? by Paula Haydar and Nadine Sinno. Austin: Center for Middle Eastern Studies, University of Texas at Austin, 2014. ISBN 978-0-292-76307-4

- 2002, Insay as-Sayyara, (Forget About The Car), Riad El-Rayyes Books, Beirut.

Translated into French under the title Fais Voir Tes Jambes Leila by Yves Gonzalez-Quijano. Paris: Actes-Sud, September 2006.

- 2005, Mabad Yanjah Fi Baghdad (Mabad Succeeds in Baghdad), Riad El-Rayyes Books, Beirut.
- 2005, Awdatu l'almani 'ila rushdihi (The German Returns To His Senses), Riad El-Rayyes Books, Beirut.

Poetry

- 1979, Hina halla al-sayf ‘ala l-sayf, (When the Sword Replaced the Sun)

Translated by J.D. Bencheikh as L’Eté au Tranchant de l’Épée Le Sycmore, Paris.

- 1980, La shay’a yafuqu l-wasf, (Nothing is Above Description), Mansurat lubnan al-gadid, Beirut.
- 1992, Ayyu thalgin yahbut bi-salam, (What Snow ever Falls in Peace), Mukhtarat, Beirut.

Film

- A film entitled Passage Au Crepuscule based upon the novel of the same title was directed by Swiss director Simon Edelstein and released in Geneva in 2000.
- A film entitled Zennar An Nar based upon the novel of the title Al Mustabid directed by the Lebanese director Bahij Hojeij in 2004.

Theatre

- A play entitled Qu’elle Aille au diable Meryl Streep based upon the novel of the same title was written by the Algerian French scenarist Mohammad Qacimi, and produced by Nidal Achqar, in Arabic and French.
