= Bushra El-Turk =

British composer and music educator (born 1982)

- Born: 10 November 1982; London, United Kingdom
- Genre: contemporary classical music
- Occupations: composer, researcher and music educator
- Years active: 2002–present
- Website: www.bushraelturk.com

Bushra El-Turk (born 1982 in London, UK) is a British composer and contemporary music educator of Lebanese parents. Named by the BBC as "one of the most inspiring 100 Women of today", she has written numerous compositions for live concerts, dance, theatre and multi-media performances, performed and broadcast on radio and television by prestigious musicians in various countries of Europe and the Middle East.

== Life and career ==
El-Turk studied composition at the Guildhall School of Music and Drama for five years. In 2017, she graduated with a PhD in Musical Composition at the University of Birmingham, having been supervised by Michael Zev Gordon, with her thesis focused on the relation of Middle-Eastern and Western classical music. Up to 2023, her more than 60 musical works include a wide variety of styles and influences. Among others, she has composed vocal music for soloists and choirs, accompanied by piano, non-western musical ensembles or symphony orchestra. Her works often integrate musical traditions and musicians from different cultural backgrounds. They have been performed in live performances, film scores and programmes on radio and TV, and often include elements of dance, theatre and multi-media. In an interview with Classical Music magazine, El-Turk stated: "I’m very interested in exploring the spectrum between the written and the improvised, between the spoken and the song and between music and theatre."

As a researcher and educator of contemporary music, El-Turk's areas of interest include contemporary composition, cross cultural collaborations and the integration of composition and improvisation. Besides programmes for young composers at the Tŷ Cerdd in Wales, the National Concert Hall Ireland Creative Lab Programme, and the Alternative Conservatory in London, she has given courses at the junior department of the Royal College of Music.

El-Turk's works have been performed by the London Symphony Orchestra, BBC Symphony Orchestra, London Sinfonietta, Orchestre National de Lorraine, the Latvian Radio Choir, Lebanese Philharmonic Orchestra and others. Her compositions have been performed at venues including Lincoln Center NYC, Deutsche Oper Berlin, Konzerthaus in Vienna, Birmingham Symphony Hall, Bridgewater Hall Manchester, the Southbank Centre and Barbican Centre in London. In 2018, she had her BBC Proms debut with a work performed by the soprano Carly Owen of National Opera Studio and Babylon Orchestra of Berlin.

Composed for the London Symphony Orchestra and conducted by Simon Rattle, El-Turk's composition Tuqus had its world premiere in June 2019, including students from the Guildhall School of Music and 55 young musicians from East London, who were taking part in LSO's On Track free concert on Trafalgar Square. The piece is inspired by a Middle-Eastern ritual performed by women. According to El-Turk, "Tuqus means ‘ritual’ in Arabic and it evokes the spirit of zaar, which is a community healing, trance-like ritual of drumming and dance."

Excerpts of El-Turk's multi-media opera Woman at Point Zero were first performed as a work in progress at the 2017 Shubbak festival of contemporary Arab culture in London. In 2020, this piece was awarded the Fedora-Generali Prize for Opera, allowing it to be subsequently fully produced for the stage. The complete version was first performed as a production of the Belgian LOD Music Theatre, with stage direction by Egyptian theatre director Laila Soliman, and conducted by Kanako Abe at the 2022 Aix-en-Provence Festival. Other performances in 2023 included venues in London, various cities in Belgium, Luxembourg, and Valencia, Spain. Further, El-Turk is artistic director and leader of musical Ensemble Zar that collaborated in these performances. It received an Ivor Novello Award nomination at The Ivors Classical Awards 2024 for Best Stage Work Composition.

In 2014, El-Turk was named by the BBC as one of the most inspiring 100 Women of today. Her activities for contemporary music awards include having been a member of the jury for the Classical Ivor Novello Awards, as well as adjudicator for the Commonwealth Young Composer Awards and member of the board of directors at the Independent Society of Musicians.

In October 2023 El-Turk received an Ivor Novello Award nomination at The Ivors Classical Awards. Her work Ka, composed for percussion soloist and string orchestra, was nominated for Best Large Ensemble Composition. El-Turk won an Ivor Novello Award on 12 November 2024: Woman at Point Zero won Best Stage Work Composition at The Ivors Classical Awards.

In October 2025 she was nominated for an Ivor Novello Award for her piece Three Tributes for string quartet.

== Critical reception ==
Referring to El-Turk's work Tmesis performed at the first night of the BBC Proms Dubai 2019, music critic Fiona Maddox remarked that El-Turk "tried pursuing the idea of home in her music, but home is 'in a constant state of flux'".

In his review of the performance her opera Woman at Point Zero at the 2017 Shubbak Festival, music critic Bill Barclay called it the "centrepiece of this Shubbak festival concert" and "an arresting new piece of music theatre." Writing for The Observer's classical music reviews, Fiona Maddox said about the 2023 performance at the Royal Opera's Linbury Theatre in London:

El-Turk's music, striking and distinctive, conducted by Kanako Abe and played by Ensemble Zar, drives the emotional energy, shedding light and shade on the text's bleakness. The whispers, crunches and urgent rhythms were part written, part improvised, for instruments including cello, accordion, Korean transverse flute, Iranian bowed kamancha and more.

— Fiona Maddox, music critic, The week in classical: Don Carlo; Woman at Point Zero; History of the Present – review

In Gramophone magazine's Opera Now newsletter, Owen Mortimer wrote:

El-Turk specialises in integrating music from diverse cultural traditions, often with surprising results. This score is no exception and features an extraordinary line-up of instruments from around the world. [...] This unique palette allows for some fascinating sonic combinations that run the gamut from slowly shifting cluster harmonies to passages of beguiling rhythmic complexity.

— Owen Mortimer, Opera Now magazine, 2023, Bushra El Turk: Woman at Point Zero at ROH Linbury Theatre | Live Review

== Selected works ==
- Silk Moth (2015)
- Tuqus for multi-ability symphony orchestra (2019)
- The Incomplete Sky (2021) for Taegum solo and classical orchestra
- Woman at Point Zero (2021/22), opera
- Rostan, Rastan and Rast-gAree for kamancheh and string quartet (2023)

== Discography ==
2016 Tmesis, François-Xavier Roth / London Symphony Orchestra

2020 Tik Tak, on Fadia Tomb El-Hage's album Masarat

2023 Mendelssohn / Tailleferre / Canat de Chizy / Clyne / El-Turk / Holmès / Pépin, Orchestra Pasdeloup
