= June Rain =

2006 novel by Jabbour Douaihy

- Author: Jabbour Douaihy
- Language: Arabic
- Genre: Crime fiction
- Set in: Northern Lebanon
- Publisher: Dar Al-Saqi
- Publication date: 2006
- Publication place: Lebanon
- Pages: 352

June Rain (Arabic: مطر حزيران) is a 2006 novel written by Lebanese critic and writer Jabbour Douaihy. The novel was published in 2006 by Dar Al-Nahar for Publishing and Distribution by Dar Al-Saqi’s in London. It has been translated to French, Italian, German, and English. The book was also shortlisted for the 2008 International Prize for Arabic Fiction.

== Description ==
The story begins with a massacre at a funeral in the village of Burj al-Hawa. Twenty-four people are killed and many others are wounded. The story follows a Lebanese man who returns home after 43 years to investigate his father's death. The novel begins on the afternoon after the massacre when children returned to the village from school. The villagers knew of the massacre, but they did not tell the children.

The main character of the story is a man named Eliyya. His father was one of the people killed in the massacre at the church in his village, Burj Al-Hawa, Lebanon, on 16 June 1957. His mother wanted to protect him, so she took him to live with relatives in the United States while she continued living in Lebanon. In the United States Eliyya invented stories about his roots, but after 43 years away, he returned to Lebanon, where he searched for his identity. He tried to discover facts about the massacre and many people told him the facts from their own perspectives.

The novel has been translated into different languages including, French, Italian, German, and English, and it was shortlisted for the 2008 Booker International Prize for Arabic Fiction. Paula Haydar's English translation of the novel earned her a second place finish in the 2014 Saif Ghobash Banipal Prize. The Beirut Daily Star also recognized the Haydar translation in a year-end book review list of the six Top Middle East Novels of 2014 in translation.

== Reception ==
Reviewing the book for Qantara.de, Marcia Lynx Qualey wrote that June Rain was "both an important and a delightful book", but identified its flaw as being "a 'whodunit' without a 'who'", preventing a satisfying conclusion. Ramona Wadi of The New Arab stated that the novel follows several futile trajectories of memory to no resolution, and lamented the use of an "unreliable narrator that seeks to withhold information as he pleases". Manal Shakir, writing for Arab News said: "There is a humorous undertone to the characters, although the tragedy at the heart of the story lives on in them." Mona Zaki of Banipal called it rich, complex, beautifully written and "one of the most profound depictions of grief ... one of the most powerful novels on Lebanon."
