= Alexandra Chreiteh =

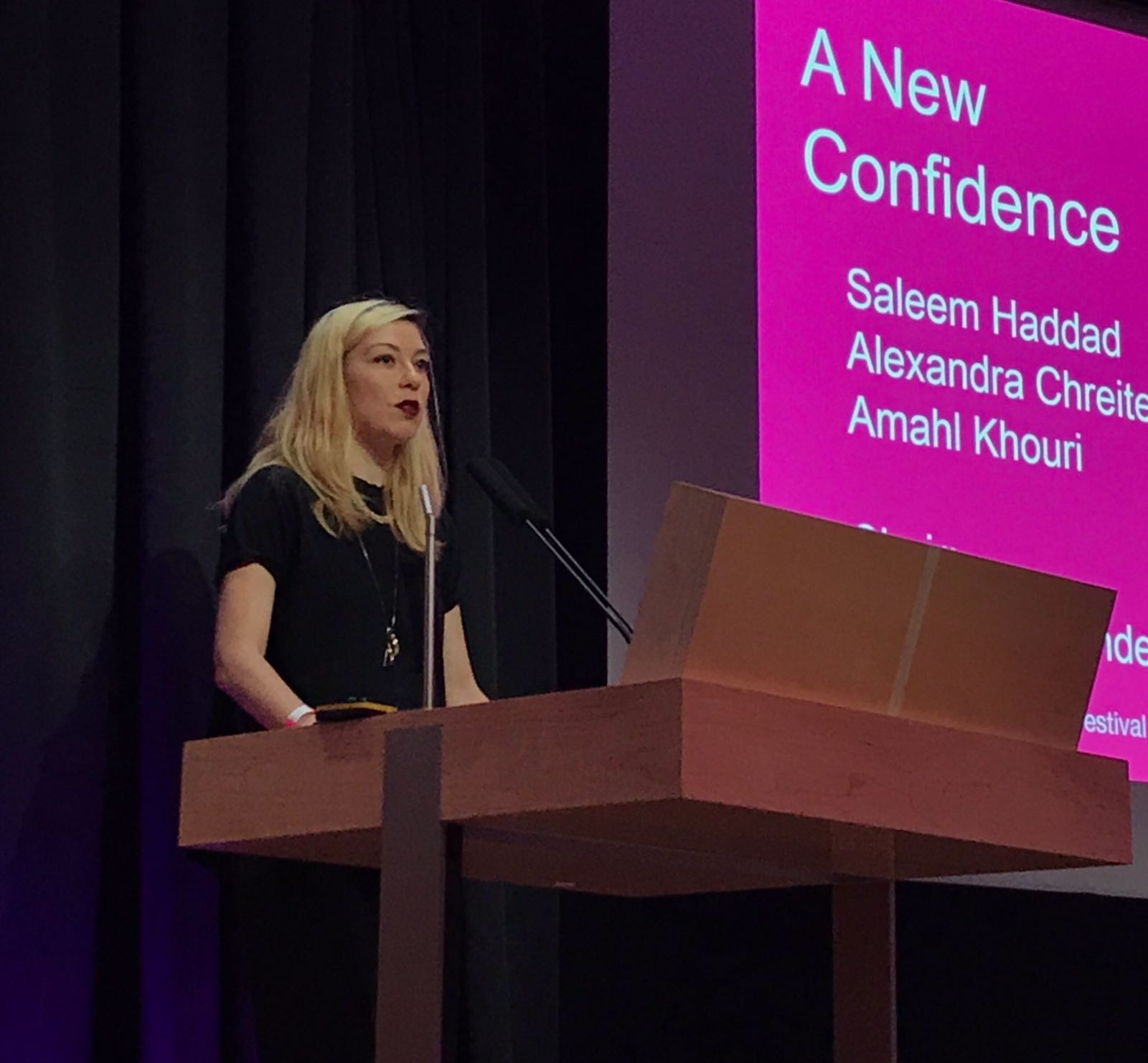
- Alexandra Chreiteh speaking in 'Shubbak,' Festival of Arabic Literature, London, UK 2017
- Born: 1987 (age 38–39); Moscow, Russia
- Education: PhD in Comparative Literature from Yale University; B.A. in English Literature from Lebanese American University

Alexandra Chreiteh ألكسندرا شريتح is a Lebanese author known for her portrayal of the barriers faced by Arab women.

== Life and work ==
Chreiteh was born in Moscow, Russia, and was raised in a religiously conservative region in Lebanon by her Russian mother and Lebanese father. Chreiteh completed her bachelor's degree in English literature at the Lebanese American University in Beirut, Lebanon. In Fall 2009, after being granted a graduate fellowship by Yale University, she commenced her PhD in Comparative Literature. While at Yale, Chreiteh completed her Master of Arts as well as a Master of Philosophy in comparative literature. She graduated with a PhD in 2016. Among other literature and film classes, Chreiteh taught creative writing at Yale's iconic Daily Themes course.

Chreiteh's creative work is originally in Arabic. Her work focuses on the intimate zones of conflict in post-war Lebanon. It breaks taboos as it deals with women and sexuality in environments that negotiate tradition and modernity. Her fresh narratives, the unique ironic-humorous style she voices, as well as her radical use of language, make her stand out in the literary landscape. Chreiteh has been a speaker in major literary festivals such as The Solothurn Festival of Literature in Solothurn, Switzerland (2012) and the Shubbak Festival of Arabic Literature, speaking on “Queerness and Queer Characters in Arabic Literature” in The British Library, London, United Kingdom (2017).

Chreiteh is based in Boston, where she is a Mellon Bridge Assistant Professor of Arabic and International Literary and Visual Studies at Tufts University. Her intellectual work on The Fantastic, Magical Realism, and Genre in Minority Literatures has appeared in various academic publications. She is fluent Arabic, Russian, English, French, Hebrew, and speaks some German. Chreiteh is working on her third novel.

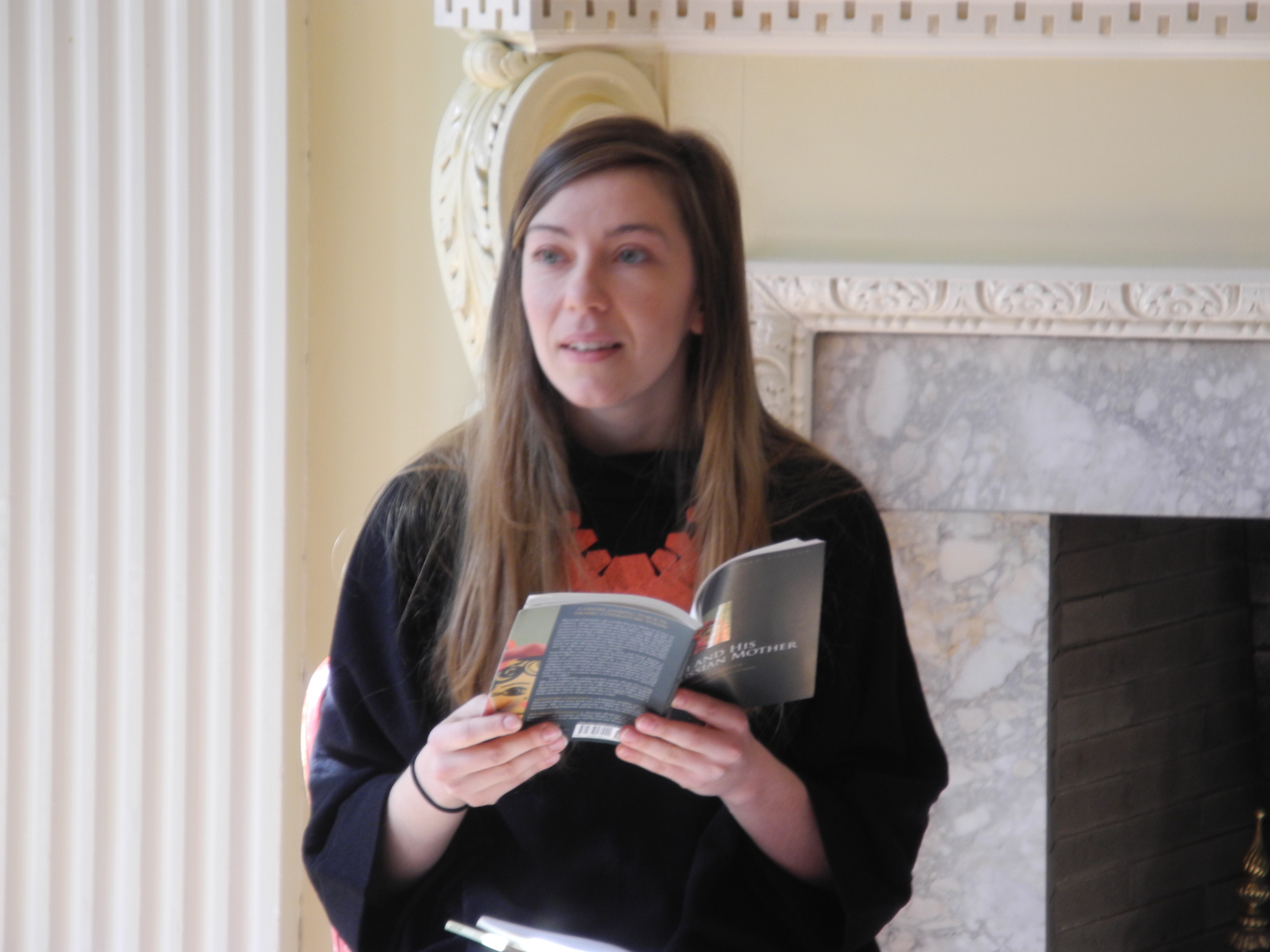
Alexandra Chreiteh reading from her novel, Boston University, 2017

== Always Coca-Cola ==
Chreiteh completed her first novel, Always Coca-Cola, while studying at the Lebanese American University, after drafting the story for an assignment in an Arabic creative writing class. The book's protagonist is Abeer Ward, a college-age woman who is concerned with protecting her purity and closely following Muslim traditions. Her close friend and model, Yana, is pregnant out of wedlock, and Abeer attempts to help her. Yana's modeling career puts her into a soda ad that features her nearly naked body. Abeer witnesses and experiences many attacks on women's bodies which lead her to experience a coming-of-age moment.

The manuscript, which drew offers from three publishers, was first released in May 2009 and English translation by Michelle Hartman followed in 2012. It received favourable reviews for shedding an intimate light on the lives of Arab women. According to Chreiteh, she "wasn't trying to write something extraordinary - it's just the people you see every day".

== Ali and His Russian Mother ==
In 2010, Chreiteh published her second novel, Ali and His Russian Mother [ʻAlī wa-ummuhu al-Rūsīyah]. Like Always Coca-Cola, it was translated to English by Michelle Hartman who maintained Chreiteh's omission of chapters or subheadings in favour of a "continuous flow of words". The story takes place in the 2006 Israel-Hezbollah War. The protagonist is a young homosexual Lebanese man who discovers that one of his ancestors was Jewish.

== Bibliography ==
- 2009; Always Coca-Cola, a novel in Arabic. Arab Scientific Publishers: Beirut, Lebanon
- 2009; Ali and his Russian Mother [ʻAlī wa-ummuhu al-Rūsīyah], a novel in Arabic. Arab Scientific Publishers: Beirut, Lebanon
- 2012; Always Coca-Cola, Translated to English by Michelle Hartman. Interlink Publishers: Northampton, MA, USA
- 2015; Always Coca-Cola, Translated to German by Christine Batterman. Verlag Hans Schiler: Berlin, Germany
- 2015; Ali and his Russian Mother, a novel in Arabic. Translated to English by Michelle Hartman. Interlink Publishers: Northampton, MA, USA
