= Nazik Saba Yared =

Lebanese novelist and academic (born 1928)

- نازك سابا يارد
- Born: 11 April 1928 (age 98); Jerusalem, Mandatory Palestine
- Education: Degree in Philosophy, Fu'ād al-Awwal University, Cairo; M.A. and Ph.D. in Arabic Literature, American University of Beirut
- Occupations: Novelist; Academic; Professor; Writer
- Employer: Lebanese American University (1978–1998)
- Notable work: Cultural diversity and cultural differences; Secularism in the Arab world
- Spouse: Ibrahim Yared
- Children: 3

Nazik Saba Yared (Arabic: نازك سابا يارد; born 11 April 1928 in Jerusalem, Mandatory Palestine) is a Lebanese novelist and academic, a former professor, and a writer. She is the daughter of Alexander and Hala (Maalouf) Saba. She was married to the late Ibrahim Yared and has three children and four grandchildren.

She earned her degree in philosophy from Fu'ād al-Awwal University in Cairo followed by a Master's and a Ph.D. in Arabic Literature from the American University of Beirut. She first taught Arabic literature at the French Protestant College Collège Protestant Français in Beirut and later from 1978 to 1998 at the Lebanese American University in Beirut.

== Works ==
- حماد عجرد Dār al-Fikr al-Lubnān, 1983
- الصدى المخنوق :: رواية / مؤسسة نوفل،, 1986
- Taqasim ‘ala watarin da’i’ (Improvisations on a missing string). Beirut: Naufal Group. 1992
  - Improvisations on a missing string. Translated by Stuart A. Hancox. Arkansas: Arkansas University Press. 1997. ISBN 978-1-55728-496-9.
- Al-dhikrayat al-mulghat. Beirut: Naufal Group. 1998
  - Cancelled memories. Translated by Nadine Sinno. Syracuse: Syracuse University Press. 2009. ISBN 978-0-8156-0937-7.
- Dhikrayat lam taktamil. Beirut: Saqi Books. 2008

=== Non-fiction ===
- Cheryl Toman, ed. (2007). "Evelyne Accad on Women Excised". On Evelyne Accad: essays in literature, feminism, and cultural studies. Summa Publications. ISBN 978-1-883479-53-4.
- Al-rahhaloun al-`arab wa hadarat al-gharb (Arab travellers and Western Civilization), Beirut: Naufal Group, 1991
  - Arab travellers and Western Civilization, London: Saqi Books, 1996

In the Wake of Abu Nuwas (1997) Anthology and Study of Ibn ar-Rumi's Satirical Poetry, Dar al-Saqi (London, England), 1988.

- al-Kātibāt al-Lubnānīyāt: bībliyūghrāfiyā, 1850-1950, Dār al-Sāqī, 2000
  - Secularism and the Arab World: (1850-1939), Saqi Books, 26 June 2002, ISBN 978-0-86356-393-5

Untranslated works Yared, Nazik Saba 1928- | Encyclopedia.com

Elias Abu-Shabki (literary criticism), Beit al-Hikma (Beirut, Lebanon), 1969.

Ibn ar-Rumi (literary criticism), Beit al-Hikma (Beirut, Lebanon), 1980.

Ahmad Shauqi (literary criticism), Beit al-Hikma (Beirut, Lebanon), 1981.

Hammad Ajrad (literary criticism), Dar al-Fikr al-Lubnani (Beirut, Lebanon), 1983.Nuqtat ad-Da'ira (novel), Dar al-Fikr al-Lubnani (Beirut, Lebanon), 1983.

Assada al-Makhnuq (novel), Naufal (Beirut, Lebanon), 1986.

Kana al-Amsu Ghadan (novel), Naufal (Beirut, Lebanon), 1988.

In the Wake of Abu Nuwas (literary criticism), Naufal (Beirut, Lebanon), 1992.Fi Dhill al-Qal'a (novel), Dar al-Kitab al-Alami (Beirut, Lebanon), 1996.

Al-Dhikrayat al-Mulghat (novel), Naufal (Beirut, Lebanon), 1998.

Ba'idan 'an Dhill al-Qal'a (novel), Dar al-Kitab al-Alami (Beirut, Lebanon), 1998.

(With Nuhá Bayyumi) Al-Katib 'at al-Lubnaniyat: biblioghrafiya, 1850-1950, Saqi (Beirut, Lebanon), 2000.

Ayam Beirut (novel), Dar al-Kitab al-Alami (Beirut, Lebanon), 2002.

Al La'na (novel) Arab Scientific Publishers (Beirut, Lebanon), 2014

Fekdan (novel) Naufal (Beirut, Lebanon), 2018

== Reviews ==
- "Reviews", International Journal of Middle East Studies (1998), 30: 317-318
- "Review: Canceled Memories, Story Circle Book Reviews
