= Sayed Gouda =

Egyptian poet, novelist and translator

Sayed Gouda (born in Cairo) is an Egyptian poet, novelist and translator. He majored in the Chinese language.

== Biography ==
Dr Sayed Gouda was born in Cairo and moved to Hong Kong where he currently resides. He did his undergraduate studies in Egypt and China, majoring in Chinese, and received his PhD in comparative literary studies from the City University of Hong Kong in 2014. His research interests include comparative literature, comparative cultural studies, and translation studies. Gouda is a published poet, novelist, and translator. His works and translations have appeared in Arabic, English, Chinese, French, German, Spanish, Macedonian, Uzbek, Romanian, and Mongolian. He is the editor of a literary website called Nadwah that features five languages: Arabic, Chinese, English, French, and German (www.arabicnadwah.com/index-english.htm). From 2004 to 2010, he organised a monthly literary salon in Hong Kong. He has also participated in many international poetry festivals and academic conferences around the world. Gouda won first prize in poetry from the Faculty of Languages (al-Alsun), Ain Shams University. In addition, in 2012, he was awarded the Enchanting Poet Award by The Enchanting Verses Literary Review, and in 2014, an honorary prize for his poem ‘Night Train’ from Shijie huawen shibao 世界華文詩報 (Journal of Chinese World Poetry).

Sayed Gouda has fourteen books in Arabic, English and Chinese. He has translated hundreds of poems from and into Arabic, Chinese, and English. His works and translations have appeared in Arabic, English, Chinese, French, German, Spanish, Macedonian, Uzbek, Thai, and Mongolian.

Currently, he is a professor of Translation (Arabic-Chinese-English), Comparative Cultural Studies and Comparative Literature.

== Published works ==
Poetry collection in Arabic:

- Dukhan al-Hub ['The Smoke of Love']. Dar al-Mashriq al-Arabi, Cairo.
- Tasa’ulat Cassandra al-Hazina ['The Sad Questions of Cassandra']. Merit, Cairo.
- Bayn inkisar al-Hulm wal Amal ['Between a Broken Dream and Hope']. Sanabil, Cairo.
- Fi Hadat al-Layl [In the Quiet of the Night]. Nadwah, Hong Kong.
- I Made You My Solitude [我是你成为我的孤独], 2015. Qinghai People's Publishing House, Qinghai.
- Fi Markabat ath-Thikrah [On the Carriage of Memory], 2016. Nadwah, Hong Kong.

Translated poetry:

- Prophet of the Poets, 2008. Makavej, Skopie. (a collection of poems translated into Macedonian published in Macedonia).
- Fi Hadat al-Layl ['In the Quiet of the Night'], 2015. Nadwah, Hong Kong (with the support of Hong Kong Arts Development Council).
- 我使你成为我的孤独 Wo shi ni chengwei wode gudu 我使你成为我的孤独 [I Made You My Solitude], 2015. Qinghai People’s Publishing House, Qinghai, China.
- Fi Markabat ath-Thikrah [On the Carriage of Memory], 2016. Nadwah, Hong Kong.

Novels in English:

- Once Upon a Time in Cairo, 2006. Balcksmith, Hong Kong.
- Closed Gate, 2015. Nadwah, Hong Kong (with the support of Hong Kong Arts Development Council).

Translation works:

Poetry translated from Arabic into English and Chinese:

- [A Bottle of Glue 一瓶膠水], 2007. Nadwah Press, Cairo.

Poetry translated from Chinese into Arabic:

- Lahibu Narin wa Kalimat, Jidi Majia [‘Flames and Words, Poetry by Jidi Majia'], 2014. Saqi, Beirut.

Poetry translated from English into Arabic:

- [Hadithul Ruh] [Baring the Soul], 2015. Nadwah Press, Cairo.
- [Amakin Samawiya] [Heavenly Places], 2015. Nadwah Press, Cairo.

Novels translated from Chinese into English:

- [Rainbow], 2017. Xlibris, Michigan.

== Upcoming works ==
- Anthology of Modern Arabic Poetry translated into English and Chinese
- Anthology of Modern Chinese Poetry translated into Arabic
- Abu Nuwas and Li Bai: Life and Poetry – comparative study

== Prizes ==
- Honorary prize for the poem 'Night Train' from the World Chinese Poetry Journal. May 2014.
- The Enchanting Poet Award of The Enchanting Verses Literary Review. November 2012.
- First prize in a poetry competition at Al-Alsun Faculty. March 1990.

== What others say about Sayed Gouda ==
Stuart Christie: In the end, Sayed Gouda's In the Quite of the Night is worthier than we are. His poetry has earned it, and it is only when one's poetry is rated so highly that the pestering critic says, as I do now, that I would like to learn Arabic to understand Gouda's heart and soul better. His poetry is among the best I have read in any year.

Bill Purves: Those who enjoy poetry with rhythm and rhyme—mouldy old figs who enjoy Kipling and Robert W. Service—are these days often reduced to song lyrics and the couplets of rappers and unlikely to find anything there to their taste. How refreshing then to learn that Sayed Gouda has chosen to republish some of his Arabic poetry in English.

The Peruvian poet Jorge Palma says about the poet: Sayed Gouda, el poeta, no negocia, presenta su mundo particular, su paraíso perdido, y con la verdad (la suya, intransferible) se revela. Desde su propia montaña, se declara abiertamente en contra de la Injusticia, el desorden, en una realidad dislocada; poesía en verdadero contrapunto con un mundo vacío de contenido, donde el poeta queda solo, anunciando sus verdades frente a la incomprensión de un mundo distraído, mayoritariamente carente de sensibilidad.

[Sayed Gouda, the poet, does not negotiate. He presents his own world, his paradise lost, and with the truth – his own, non-transferable – he reveals himself. From his own mountain, he speaks out openly against injustice and disruption in a disjointed reality; poetry in stark contrast with a world devoid of substance, where the poet is left alone, announcing his truths in the face of the incomprehension of an inattentive world largely devoid of sensitivity.]

Moroccan critic bin-Isa bu-Hmalah says about his collection of poems Between a Broken Dream and Hope: ‘. . . we can sketch the poetic identity that floats in the book and represents the poet himself. That poetic identity that has the same characteristics of migration, supremacy, and prophethood in an immoral, miserable, and unpoetic world that represents the ugly face of the world . . . [the poet’s] overwhelming sense of prophethood, together with the image of a crucified prophet, is similar to the image of Jesus in its universal imagination. This is what the poet proclaims in the headline that prefaces his collection: (O my heart, crucified on the pole of dream, / you look at them from above, in renunciation / they see you crucified, / void of will / but you see them an emptiness, / a mere illusion)’.

Egyptian poet and critic Yasser Uthman says about his poem 'Under the Cross of Spartacus': ‘This poem has what satisfies the desire of interpretation and answers the reader’s instinct as he searches for the three dimensions of the poem’s words. . . . The text, selected here, is fond of employing signs and infatuated for playing the game of symbols and persona’.

== Teaching experience (courses) ==
1. Selected Readings of British Literature
2. Translation Chinese—English (Postgraduate level)
3. Interpretation Chinese—English (Postgraduate level)
4. Consecutive Interpretation Chinese—Arabic (Postgraduate level)
5. Interpretation Skills Chinese—Arabic (Postgraduate level)
6. Introduction to World Civilization
7. Appreciating Western Masterpieces
8. Madness and Literature
9. Practical Translation (Chinese—English)
10. Translation Workshop (Chinese—English)
11. Cross-Cultural Studies
12. Comparative Cultural Studies
13. Cross-Cultural Communication
14. Language Through Literature
