= Jabbour Douaihy =

Lebanese writer (1949–2021)

- Born: 1949; Zgharta, Lebanon
- Died: 23 June 2021 (aged 71–72)
- Education: New Sorbonne University
- Writing career
- Notable works: June Rain; Autumn Equinox

Jabbour Douaihy (Arabic: جبور الدويهي; 1949 – 23 June 2021) was a critically-acclaimed Lebanese writer, translator, and professor of literature. His novels were nominated four times for the International Prize for Arabic Fiction, and he has also published translations, short story collections, and children's books. His work, mostly originally in Arabic, has been translated several languages, including English and French.

== Life and education ==
Douaihy was born in Zgharta, Lebanon in 1949 and was a member of the city's prominent El Douaihy family.

He obtained a PhD in comparative literature from the New Sorbonne University and served a professor of French literature at the Lebanese University of Tripoli.

He was also known for mentoring younger writers, such as through the International Prize for Arabic Fiction Nadwa.

== Critical reception ==
Academic and translator Paula Haydar describes Jabbour as "a master of detail" in his writing.

Douaihy was nominated four times for the International Prize for Arabic Fiction, the most prestigious literary award in the Arab region. He was shortlisted three times and longlisted once. He is one of only five authors to have received such repeated recognition by this award. His 2008 novel June Rain was nominated for the Arabic Booker Prize and has been translated into several languages. His last novel, The King of India, was shortlisted for the Arabic Booker Prize in 2020. The Vagrant and The American Neighborhood were also nominated for the Arabic Booker. The Vagrant was also awarded Institut du Monde Arabe's 2013 annual award for the best Arabic novel translated into French.

His work has also received awards and award nominations in translation. Autumn Equinox (2001) was the first of Douaihy's novels to be translated into English, by Nay Youssef Hannawi, and it won the Arkansas Arabic Translation Award. Paula Haydar's translation of June Rain was runner-up for the Banipal Prize for Arabic Literary Translation in 2014. He has also been translated into French by Stephanie Dujols.

A book-length critical analysis of his work was published in 2021 under the title Jabbour Douaihy: Novelist of Lebanese Life."

== Select works ==
=== Novels ===
By date of publication in Arabic.

- 1995 : Iitidal al-kharif
  English: Autumn Equinox, translated by Nay Youssef Hannawi (University of Arkansas Press, 2001)
- 1998 : Rayya an-nahr (Rayya of the River)
- 1998 : L'Âme de la forêt (The Soul of the Forest); a tale for children written in French (Éditions Hatem)
- 2002 : Ayn Warda (Rose Fountain)
- 2006 : Matar Hzayran
  English: June Rain, translated by Paula Haydar (Interlink, 2014)
- 2010 : Charid al-manazel
  English: Firefly, translated by Paula Haydar and Nadine Sinno (Seagull, 2022); also known as Chased Away and The Vagrant
- 2013 : Hayy Al Amerkan
  English: The American Neighborhood, translated by Paula Haydar (Bloomsbury Qatar, 2014); reissued as The American Quarter (Interlink, 2018)
- 2016 : Toubi’a fi Bayrut
  English: Printed in Beirut, translated by Paula Haydar (Interlink, 2018)
- 2019 : Malak al-Hind
  English: The King of India, translated by Paula Haydar (Interlink, 2022)
- 2021 : Summon fi al hawa’
  English: Poison in the Air, translated by Paula Haydar (Interlink, 2023)

=== Short story collections ===
- 1990 : Al mawt bayn al ahli nou’as (To Die Among One's Own Is to Sleep)

=== Translations into Arabic by Jabbour Douaihy ===
- Amin Maalouf's In the Name of Identity (2004)
- Dominique Vidal's Israel's Origin Sin: The expulsion of the Palestinians re-examined by the New Historians (2002)
- Hubert Vedrine's France in an Age of Globalization (2001) and History Strikes Back (2007)
- Carole Dagher's Men Who Make Peace (1994)

=== Book chapters ===
- "St. Jerome as the representation of melancholy." In Reflections on Islamic Art, ed. by Ahdaf Soueif. Doha, Qatar: Muslim of Islamic Art, 2011.

== Death ==
On 23 July 2021 Douaihy died after a long illness.
