= Kafr Tahla =

- Location in Egypt
- Coordinates: 30°23′53″N 31°08′00″E
- Country: Egypt
- Governorate: Qalyubia Governorate

Population (2006)
  - Total: 4,080
- Time zone: UTC+2 (EET)
  - Summer (DST): UTC+3 (EEST)

Kafr Tahla (Arabic: كفر طحلة) is a village located in Qalyubia Governorate, Egypt.

The older name of the village is Bakha (Arabic: باخة).
