= Lisa J. White =

Arabic translator

Lisa J. White is a teacher and translator of Arabic. She was born in Philadelphia and obtained her BA from Penn State University and her MA from Harvard University. She currently teaches Arabic at the American University in Cairo. She won the Arkansas Arabic Translation Award for her translation of Little Songs in the Shade of Tamaara by the poet Mohammed Afifi.
