= Laila Soliman =

Egyptian playwright and theater director

- ليلى سليمان
- Born: 1981 (age 44–45)
- Education: American University in Cairo
- Occupation: writer

Laila Soliman (ليلى سليمان, born 1981) is an Egyptian writer and theater director from Cairo.

== Biography ==
She was born in Cairo and received a degree in theater and Arabic literature from the American University in Cairo in 2004. She received an MA in theater from the Academy of Theatre and Dance at the Amsterdam University of the Arts. She is currently a Visiting Associate Professor of Theater at New York University Abu Dhabi.

Her work stems from an interest in the state of flux in the contemporary socio-political climate and its influence on individuals, relationships, and power structures. It relies on collective memories and personal histories as ways of bridging the gap between the official versions of events and intimate, individual experiences. Her performances have been shown in Egypt, Tunisia, Lebanon, Syria, India, South Africa, and various countries in Europe. She also creates multidisciplinary projects that tie installation and theater together.

In 2011, with Ruud Gielens, she directed Lessons in Revolting, which was created with ten other Egyptian artists following the Egyptian revolution of 2011. In 2014, her play Hawa Elhorreya ("Whims of Freedom") about the Egyptian revolution of 1919 was presented at the Egyptian Centre for Culture and Arts and at the London International Festival of Theatre.

Soliman does not have a theatre company but instead people join in her projects as collaborators. She was a part of the independent theater scene in Cairo that started in the 1990s, in which plays are produced and performed in private settings. She takes on various functions herself in support of her projects as required, including publicity, fundraising and set and costume design.

In 2019, Soliman started working on Wanaset Yodit and Woman at Point Zero which were impacted by the COVID-19 pandemic. Woman at Point Zero is inspired by the novel by Egyptian writer and feminist Nawal El Saadawi. The opera tells the story of two women: Fatma, a feminist imprisoned for man-slaughter and Sama, a documentary filmmaker who wants to tell Fatma's story. Produced by LOD Theatre, it explores abuse and women's liberation.Woman at Point Zero has been touring international across the globe since its premiere. It also won "Jury Nominee" and "Best New Opera".

== Published Works ==
=== Plays ===
- The Retreating World (2004) by Naomi Wallace
- Ghorba, Images of Alienation (2006)
- Egyptian Products (2008)
- …At Your Service! (2009)
- Spring Awakening in the Tuktuk (2010)
- No Time for Art, series (2011)
- Here, There & Everywhere (2013)
- La Grande Maison (2015)
- The National Museum of the State Security System (2015)
- Zigzig (2016)
- Superheroes (2017)
- Museum of Lungs (2018)
- My Body Belongs to Me (2019)
- Wanaset Yodit (2020)
- Woman at Point Zero (2022)
- Temporary People (2022)
