= Nawal El Saadawi =

Egyptian feminist writer, activist, physician and psychiatrist (1931–2021)

- نوال السعداوي
- Nawal El Saadawi in her home on September 30, 2015 in Cairo
- Born: 27 October 1931; Kafr Tahla, Egypt
- Died: 21 March 2021 (aged 89); Cairo, Egypt
- Other name: Nawal Zeinab El Sayed
- Education: Cairo University; Columbia University
- Occupations: Physician, Psychiatrist, Author
- Notable work: Women and Sex (1969); Woman at Point Zero (1975)
- Spouses: Ahmed Helmi (m. 1955; div. 1957) Rashad Bey (divorced) Sherif Hatata (m. 1964; div. 2010)
- Children: Mona Helmy, Atef Hatata

Nawal El Saadawi (Arabic: نوال السعداوي, ALA-LC: Nawāl as-Saʿdāwī; 27 October 1931 – 21 March 2021) was an Egyptian feminist writer, activist, physician, and psychiatrist. She wrote numerous books on women in Islam, focusing on issues affecting women in the Global South, including sexuality, patriarchy, social class, and colonialism.

She was the founder and president of the Arab Women's Solidarity Association. She was also a co-founder of the Arab Association for Human Rights.

She received honorary degrees from universities on three continents. In 2004, she was awarded the North–South Prize by the Council of Europe. In 2005, she received the Inana International Prize in Belgium. In 2012, the International Peace Bureau awarded her the Seán MacBride Peace Prize.

== Early life ==
The second-eldest of nine children, Saadawi was born on 27 October 1931 in the small village of Kafr Tahla, Egypt. Saadawi was subjected to female genital mutilation at the age of six, though her father believed that both girls and boys should be educated. She had described her mother and father as being relatively liberal when growing up.

Her Upper Egyptian father was a government official in the Ministry of Education, who had campaigned against the British occupation of Egypt during the Egyptian Revolution of 1919. As a result, he was exiled to a small town in the Nile Delta, and the government refrained from promoting him for 10 years. He was relatively progressive and taught his daughter self-respect and to speak her mind. He also encouraged her to study the Arabic language. However, when El Saadawi was 10 years old, her family tried to make her marry, but her mother supported her in resisting. Both her parents died at a young age, leaving Saadawi with the sole burden of providing for a large family. Her mother, Zaynab, was partially descendant from a wealthy Ottoman family; Saadawi described both her maternal grandfather, Shoukry, and her maternal grandmother as having Ottoman origin. Even as a child she objected to the male-dominated society she lived in, with sons valued far more highly than daughters, reacting angrily to her grandmother who said that "a boy is worth 15 girls at least... Girls are a blight". She described herself proudly as a dark-skinned Egyptian woman since she was young.

== Career ==
Saadawi graduated as a medical doctor in 1955 from Cairo University. That year, she married Ahmed Helmi, whom she met as a fellow student in medical school. They have a daughter, Mona Helmi. The marriage ended after two years. Through her medical practice, she observed women's physical and psychological problems and connected them with oppressive cultural practices, patriarchal oppression, class oppression and imperialist oppression. Her second husband was a colleague, Rashad Bey.

While working as a doctor in her birthplace of Kafr Tahla, she observed the hardships and inequalities faced by rural women. After attempting to protect one of her patients from domestic violence, Saadawi was summoned back to Cairo. She eventually became the Director of the Ministry of Public Health and met her third husband, Sherif Hatata, while sharing an office in the Ministry of Health. Hatata, also a medical doctor and writer, had been a political prisoner for 13 years. They married in 1964 and have a son. Saadawi and Hatata lived together for 43 years and divorced in 2010.

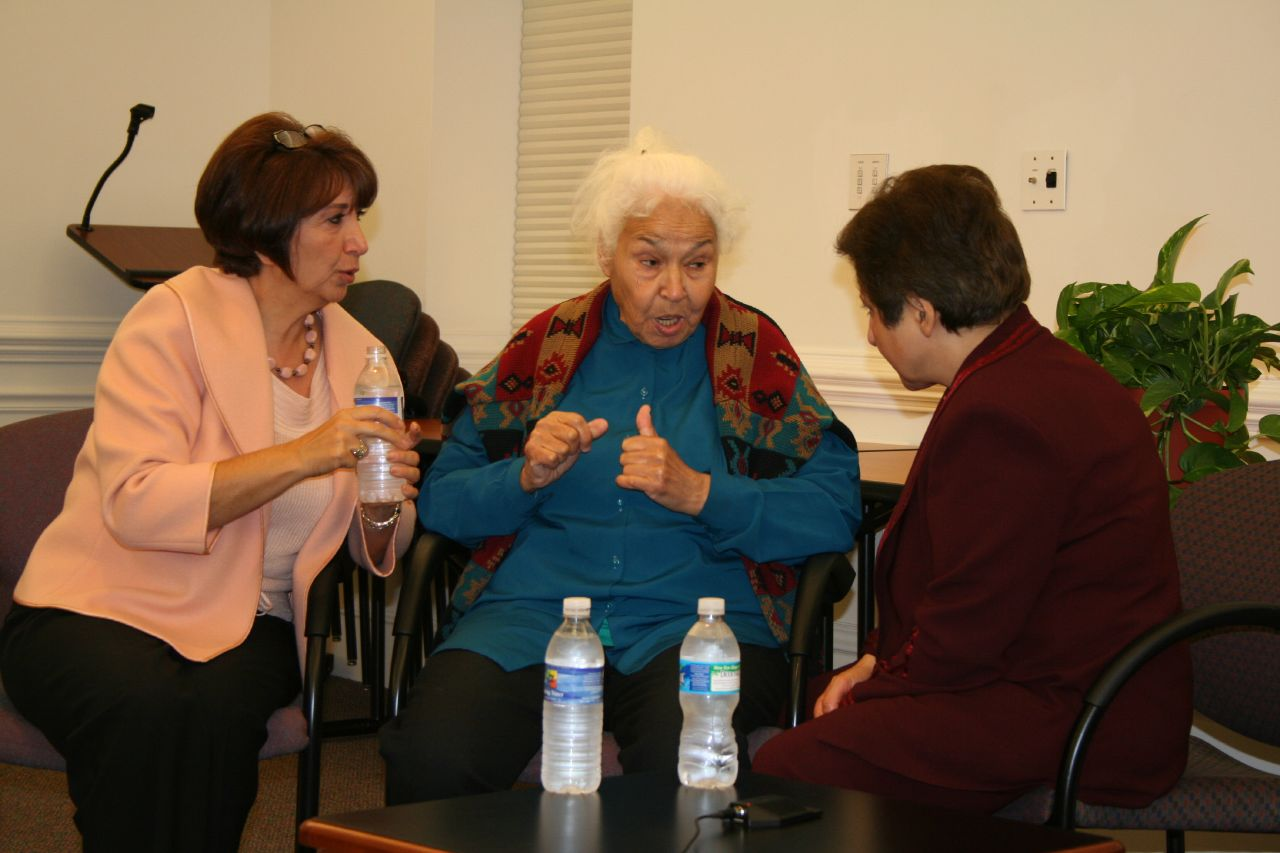
Shirin Ershadi, Shirin Ebadi and Nawal el-Saadawi

Saadawi attended Columbia University, earning a master's degree in public health in 1966. In 1972, she published Woman and Sex (المرأة والجنس), confronting and contextualising various aggressions perpetrated against women's bodies, including female circumcision. The book became a foundational text of second-wave feminism. As a consequence of the book and her political activities, Saadawi was dismissed from her position at the Ministry of Health. She also lost her positions as chief editor of a health journal, and as Assistant General Secretary in the Medical Association in Egypt. From 1973 to 1976, Saadawi worked on researching women and neurosis in Ain Shams University's Faculty of Medicine. From 1979 to 1980, she was the United Nations Advisor for the Women's Programme in Africa (ECA) and the Middle East (ECWA).

=== Court cases against her ===
In 2002 a legal attempt was made by Nabih el-Wahsh in an Egyptian Court to legally divorce el-Saadawi from her husband on account of hesba, a 9th-century principle of shariah law, that allows for the conviction of Muslims who are seen to be harming Islam. The evidence used against her was a March interview in which el-Wahsh claims was proof she had abandoned Islam. The legal attempt was unsuccessful.

In 2008, a similar attempt was made to strip el-Saadawi of her Egyptian nationality due to her radical opinions and writing. This attempt was also unsuccessful.

=== Imprisonment ===
Long viewed as controversial and dangerous by the Egyptian government, Saadawi helped publish a feminist magazine in 1981 called Confrontation. She was imprisoned in September by President of Egypt Anwar Sadat. Saadawi stated once in an interview: "I was arrested because I believed Sadat. He said there is democracy and we have a multi-party system and you can criticize. So I started criticizing his policy and I landed in jail." Sadat claimed that the established government was a democracy for the people and that democracy as always was open for constructive criticism. According to Saadawi, Sadat imprisoned her because of her criticism of his purported democracy. Even in prison she still found a way to fight against the oppression of women. While in prison she formed the Arab Women's Solidarity Association. This was the first legal and independent feminist group in Egypt. In prison, she was denied pen and paper, however, that did not stop her from continuing to write. She used a "stubby black eyebrow pencil" and "a small roll of old and tattered toilet paper" to record her thoughts. She was released later that year, one month after the President's assassination. Of her experience she wrote: "Danger has been a part of my life ever since I picked up a pen and wrote. Nothing is more perilous than truth in a world that lies."

In 1982, she founded the Arab Women's Solidarity Association. She described her organization as "historical, socialist, and feminist".

Saadawi was one of the women held at Qanatir Women's Prison. Her incarceration formed the basis for her 1983 Memoirs from the Women's Prison (Arabic: مذكرات في سجن النساء). Her contact with a prisoner at Qanatir, nine years before she was imprisoned there, served as inspiration for an earlier work, a novel titled Woman at Point Zero (Arabic: امرأة عند نقطة الصفر, 1975).

=== Further persecution, teaching in the US, and later activism ===
In 1993, when her life was threatened by Islamists and political persecution, Saadawi was forced to flee Egypt. She accepted an offer to teach at Duke University's Asian and African Languages Department in North Carolina, as well as at the University of Washington. She later held positions at a number of prestigious colleges and universities including Cairo University, Harvard, Yale, Columbia, the Sorbonne, Georgetown, Florida State University, and the University of California, Berkeley. In 1996, she moved back to Egypt.

Saadawi continued her activism and considered running in the 2005 Egyptian presidential election, before stepping out because of stringent requirements for first-time candidates. She was among the protesters in Tahrir Square in 2011. She called for the abolition of religious instruction in Egyptian schools.

Saadawi was awarded the 2004 North–South Prize by the Council of Europe. In July 2016, she headlined the Royal African Society's "Africa Writes" literary festival in London, where she spoke "On Being a Woman Writer" in conversation with Margaret Busby.

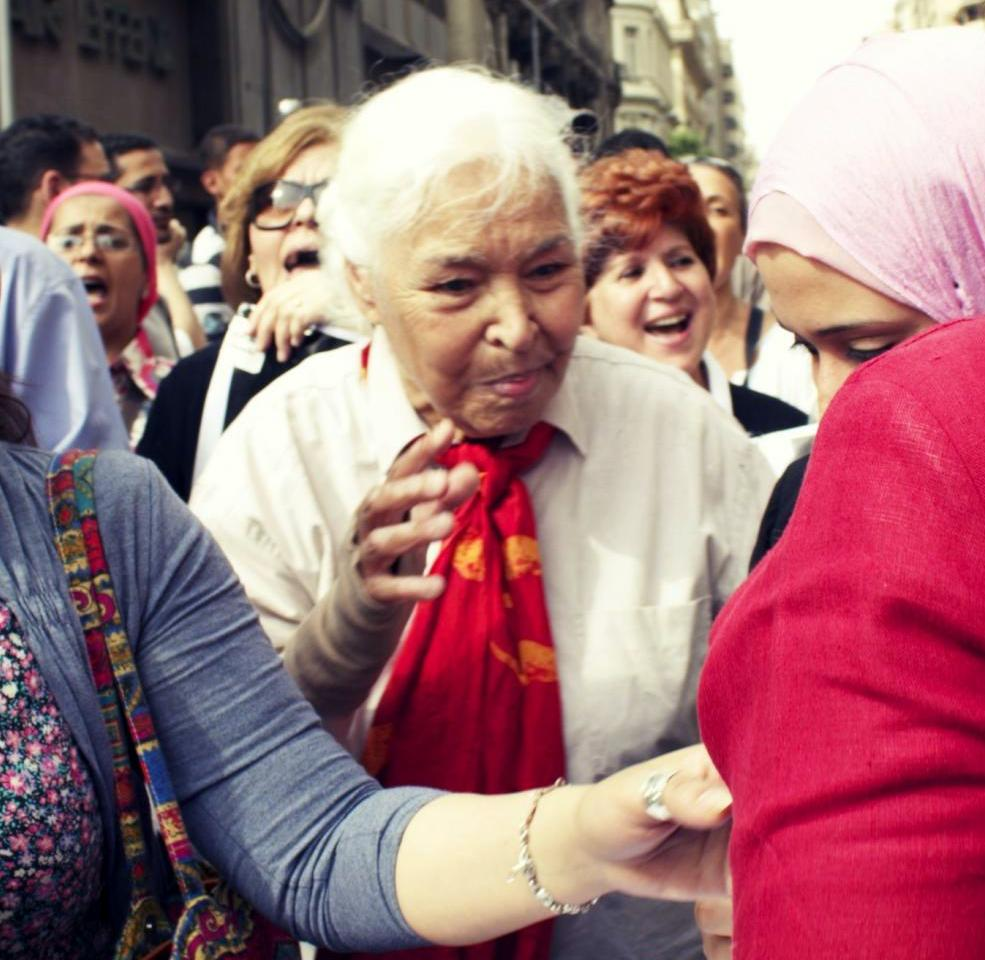
April 2012

At the Göteborg Book Fair that took place on 27 to 30 September 2018, Saadawi attended a seminar on development in Egypt and the Middle East after the Arab Spring and during her talk at the event stated that "colonial, capitalist, imperialist, racist" global powers, led by the United States, collaborated with the Egyptian government to end the 2011 Egyptian revolution. She added that she remembered seeing then-U.S. Secretary of State Hillary Clinton in Tahrir Square handing out dollar bills to the youth in order to encourage them to vote for the Muslim Brotherhood in the upcoming elections., although there is no evidence this alleged event occurred.

Nawal El Saadawi held the positions of Author for the Supreme Council for Arts and Social Sciences, Cairo; Director General of the Health Education Department, Ministry of Health, Cairo, Secretary General of the Medical Association, Cairo, Egypt, and medical doctor at the University Hospital and Ministry of Health. She was the founder of the Health Education Association and the Egyptian Women Writers' Association; she was Chief Editor of Health Magazine in Cairo, and Editor of Medical Association Magazine.

== Writing ==
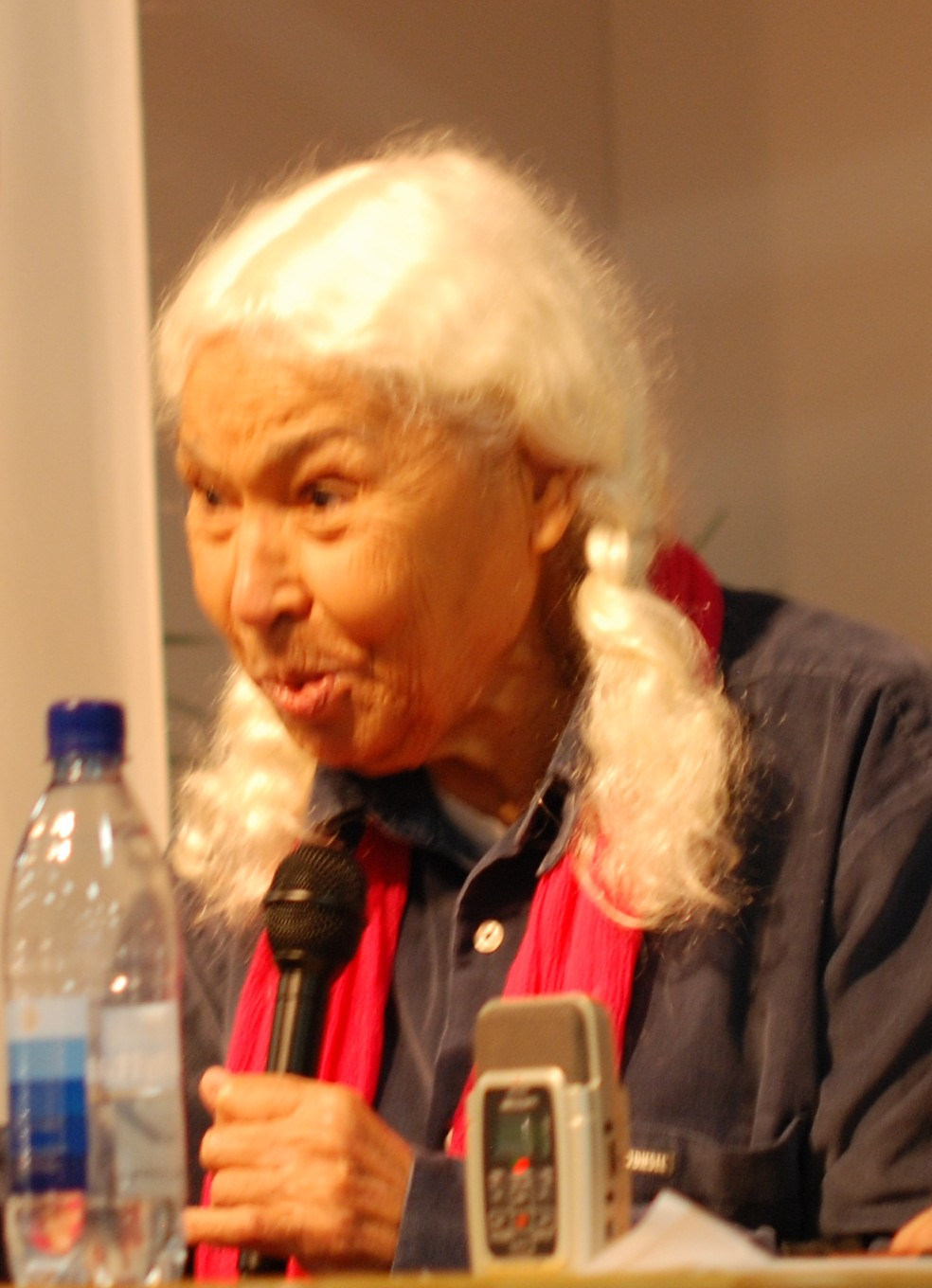
Saadawi at the Göteborg Book Fair in 2010

Saadawi began writing early in her career. Her earliest writings include a selection of short stories entitled I Learned Love (1957) and her first novel, Memoirs of a Woman Doctor (1958). She subsequently wrote numerous novels and short stories and a personal memoir, Memoir from the Women's Prison (1986). Saadawi has been published in a number of anthologies, and her work has been translated from the original Arabic into more than 30 languages.

In 1972, she published her first work of non-fiction, Women and Sex, which evoked the antagonism of highly placed political and theological authorities. It also led to her dismissal at the Ministry of Health. Other works include The Hidden Face of Eve, God Dies by the Nile, The Circling Song, Searching, The Fall of the Imam (described as "a powerful and moving exposé of the horrors that women and children can be exposed to by the tenets of faith"), and Woman at Point Zero.

Many have criticised her work The Hidden Face of Eve on claims that she was writing for the "critical foreigner". The original title of the book, directly translated into English was "The Naked Face of the Arab Woman" and many chapters have been removed from the English edition of the book, when compared to the Arabic original.

She contributed the piece "When a woman rebels" to the 1984 anthology Sisterhood Is Global, edited by Robin Morgan, and was a contributor to the 2019 anthology New Daughters of Africa, edited by Margaret Busby, which included her essay "About Me in Africa—Politics and Religion in my Childhood".

Saadawi's novel Zeina was published in Lebanon in 2009. The French translation was published under the pseudonym Nawal Zeinab el Sayed, using her mother's maiden name.

Saadawi spoke fluent English in addition to her native Egyptian Arabic. As she wrote in Arabic, she saw the question of translation into English or French as "a big problem" linked to the fact that

"the colonial capitalist powers are mainly English- or French-speaking.... I am still ignored by big literary powers in the world, because I write in Arabic, and also because I am critical of the colonial, capitalist, racist, patriarchal mindset of the super-powers."

Her book Mufakirat Tifla fi Al-Khamisa wa Al-Thamaneen (A Notebook of an 85-year-old Girl), based on excerpts from her journal, was published in 2017.

== Views ==
=== Opposition to genital mutilation ===
At a young age, Saadawi underwent the process of female genital mutilation. As an adult, she wrote about and criticized this practice. She responded to the death of a 12-year-old girl, Bedour Shaker, during a genital circumcision operation in 2007 by writing: "Bedour, did you have to die for some light to shine in the dark minds? Did you have to pay with your dear life a price ... for doctors and clerics to learn that the right religion doesn't cut children's organs?" As a doctor and human rights activist, Saadawi was also opposed to male circumcision. She believed that both male and female children deserve protection from genital mutilation.

=== Socialism and feminism ===
Saadawi describes herself as a "socialist-feminist", believing the feminist struggle cannot be won under capitalism. This socialist belief has emerged from the injustices she witnessed in her own life. In The Hidden Face of Eve she writes about how people's sexual and emotional lives cannot be separated from their economic lives and their productivity, and therefore the personal status laws in Arab countries must be a priority for socialists. In a 2018 interview she stated that she is not a Marxist, having read his works which she found problems with.

=== Religion ===
In a 2014 interview, Saadawi said that "the root of the oppression of women lies in the global post-modern capitalist system, which is supported by religious fundamentalism".

When hundreds of people were killed in what has been called a 2015 Hajj disaster during the pilgrimage (Hajj) of Muslims to Mecca, Saudi Arabia, she said:

"They talk about changing the way the Hajj is administered, about making people travel in smaller groups. What they don’t say is that the crush happened because these people were fighting to stone the devil. Why do they need to stone the devil? Why do they need to kiss that black stone? But no one will say this. The media will not print it. What is it about, this reluctance to criticize religion? ... This refusal to criticize religion ... is not liberalism. This is censorship."

She said that elements of the Hajj, such as kissing the Black Stone, had pre-Islamic pagan roots. Saadawi was involved in the academic exploration of Arab identity throughout her writing career.

Saadawi described the Islamic veil as "a tool of oppression of women".

=== Objectification of women ===
She was also critical of the objectification of women and female bodies in patriarchal social structures common in Europe and the US, upsetting fellow feminists by speaking against make-up and revealing clothes.

=== United States ===
In a 2002 lecture at the University of California at Berkeley's Center for Middle Eastern Studies, Saadawi described the US-led war on Afghanistan as "a war to exploit the oil in the region", and US foreign policy and its support of Israel as "real terrorism". Saadawi held the opinion that Egyptians are forced into poverty by US aid.

== Film ==
Saadawi is the subject of the film She Spoke the Unspeakable, directed by Jill Nicholls, broadcast in February 2017 in the BBC One television series Imagine.

== Death ==
Saadawi died on 21 March 2021, aged 89, at a hospital in Cairo. Her life was commemorated on BBC Radio 4's obituary programme Last Word.

== Selected awards and honours ==
- 2004: North–South Prize from the Council of Europe
- 2005: Inana International Prize, Belgium
- 2007: Honorary Doctorate, Vrije Universiteit Brussel, Belgium
- 2007: Honorary Doctorate, Université libre de Bruxelles, Belgium
- 2010: Honorary Doctorate, National Autonomous University of Mexico, Mexico
- 2011: Stig Dagerman Prize
- 2012: Seán MacBride Peace Prize
- 2015: BBC's 100 Women
- 2020: Time's 100 Women of the Year (1981)

== Selected works ==
Saadawi wrote prolifically, placing some of her works online.

Novels and novellas

- Mudhakkirat tabiba (Cairo, 1958). Memoirs of a Woman Doctor, trans. Catherine Cobham (Saqi Books, 1988)
- Al ghayib (Cairo, 1965). Searching, trans. Shirley Eber (Zed Books, 1991)
- Imra'tani fi-Imra'a (Cairo, 1968). Two Women in One, trans. Osman Nusairi and Jana Gough (Saqi Books, 1985)
- Maut ar-raǧul al-waḥīd ʿala ‚l-arḍ (1974). God Dies by the Nile, trans. Sherif Hetata (Zed Books, 1985)
- Al-khait wa'ayn al-hayat (Cairo, 1976). The Well of Life and the Thread: Two Short Novels, trans. Sherif Hetata (Lime Tree, 1993)
- Ughniyat al-atfal al da iriyah (Beirut: Dar al-Adab, 1977). The Circling Song, trans. Marilyn Booth (Zed Books, 1989)
- Emra'a enda noktat el sifr (Beirut: Dar al-Adab, 1977). Woman at Point Zero, trans. Sherif Hetata (Zed Books, 1983)
- Mawt Ma'ali al-Wazir Sabiqan (1980). Death of an Ex-Minister, trans. Shirley Eber (Methuen, 1987)
- Suqūṭ al-imām (Cairo, 1987). The Fall of the Imam, trans. Sherif Hetata (Methuen, 1988)
- Jann āt wa-Iblīs (Beirut, 1992). The Innocence of the Devil, trans. Sherif Hetata (Methuen, 1994)
- Ḥubb fī zaman al-naf̣t (Cairo, 1993). Love in the Kingdom of Oil, trans. Basil Hatim and Malcolm Williams (Saqi Books, 2001)
- Al-Riwayah (Cairo: Dar El Hilal, 2004). The Novel, trans. Omnia Amin and Rick London (Interlink Books, 2009)
- Zeina (Beirut: Dar Al Saqi, 2009). Zeina, trans. Amira Nowaira (Saqi Books, 2011)

Short story collections

- Ta'allamt al-hubb (Cairo, 1957). I Learned Love
- Lahzat sidq (Cairo, 1959). Moment of Truth
- Little Tenderness (Cairo, 1960)
- al-Khayt wa-l-jidar (1972). The Thread and the Wall
- Ain El Hayat (Beirut, 1976)
- Kānat hiya al-aḍʻaf ["She Was the Weaker"] (1979). She Has No Place in Paradise, trans. Shirley Eber (Methuen, 1987). Includes three additional stories: "She Has No Place in Paradise", "Two Women Friends", and "'Beautiful'".
- Adab Am Kellet Abad (Cairo, 2000)

Plays

- Ithna 'ashar imra'a fi zinzana wahida (Cairo, 1984). Twelve Women in a Cell
- Isis (Cairo, 1985)
- God Resigns in the Summit Meeting (1996), published by Madbouli, and four other plays included in her Collected Works (45 books in Arabic), Cairo: Madbouli, 2007
- Twelve Women in a Cell: Plays by Mediterranean Women (Aurora Metro Books, 1994)

Memoirs

- Mudhakkirat fi Sijn al-Nisa (Cairo, 1983). Memoirs from the Women's Prison, trans. Marilyn Booth (The Women's Press, 1986)
- Rihlati hawla al-'alam (Cairo, 1986). My Travels Around the World, trans. Shirley Eber (Methuen, 1991)
- Memoirs of a Child Called Soad (Cairo, 1990)
- Awraqi hayati, first volume (Cairo, 1995). A Daughter of Isis, trans. Sherif Hetata (Zed Books, 1999)
- Awraqi hayati, second volume (Cairo, 1998). Walking Through Fire, trans. Sherif Hetata (Zed Books, 2002)
- My Life, Part III (Cairo, 2001)

Non-fiction

- Women and Sex (Cairo, 1969)
- Woman Is the Origin (Cairo, 1971)
- Men and Sex (Cairo, 1973)
- The Naked Face of Arab Women (Cairo, 1974)
- Women and Neurosis (Cairo, 1975)
- Al-Wajh al-'ari lil-mar'a al-'arabiyy (1977). The Hidden Face of Eve: Women in the Arab World, trans. Sherif Hetata (Zed Press, 1980)
- On Women (Cairo, 1986)
- A New Battle in Arab Women Liberation (Cairo, 1992)
- Collection of Essays (Cairo, 1998)
- Collection of Essays (Cairo, 2001)
- Breaking Down Barriers (Cairo, 2004)

Compilations in English

- Plays by Mediterranean Women (Aurora Metro Books, 1994, ISBN 978-0-9515877-3-7)
- North/South: The Nawal El Saadawi Reader (Zed Books, 1997)
- Off Limits: New Writings on Fear and Sin (Gingko Library, 2019, ISBN 978-88-87847-16-1)

== See also ==
- List of Egyptian authors
- Feminism in Egypt
- Islamic literature
