= Sherif Hatata =

Egyption doctor and communist activist

- Born: 13 September 1923; Egypt
- Died: 22 May 2017 (aged 93)
- Occupations: Doctor, author and communist activist
- Spouses: Nawal El Saadawi (m. 1964; div. 2010) Amal Elgamal (m. 2006)

Sharif Hatata (Arabic: شريف حتاتة; 13 September 1923 – 22 May 2017) was an Egyptian doctor, author and communist activist.

== Early life ==
Hatata was born in Egypt on 13 September 1923 to an Egyptian father, Fathallah Hetata Pasha, and an English mother. His father was a Western-educated, feudal landowner, and his family was upper middle-class. Hatata, who was raised in his home village in the Nile Delta region, was taught little about agriculture, the sector his family relied on for income. In his 20s, Hatata became appalled at the impoverished conditions in which the fellahin that worked his father's lands lived and expressed resentment that he was "the heir of feudalism and one of its sons."

== Activism ==
In the years immediately following World War II, Hatata was invited and accepted to join Iskra, one of Egypt's major communist movements, founded in 1942 by Hillel Schwartz. Hatata cited his reasoning for joining Iskra because the left-wing movement in Egypt in general was "progressive, open, ... wasn't traditional or fanatical," while other ideological movements seemed predicated on "emotional patriotism." In 1947 Iskra merged into Democratic Movement for National Liberation (DMNL). In 1948, Hatata was arrested by the authorities during an anti-communist crackdown by the monarchist authorities.

He was released after the monarchy was overthrown by a group of revolutionary officers in July 1952. Following the 1952 revolution, he became a member of the Voice of the Peasants newspaper's editorial board. When two of Hatata's DMNL comrades escaped detention, they fled and temporarily stayed at Hatata's home. Hatata was under police surveillance at the time and upon learning of it, the three left for the house of another released DMNL comrade. However, they were tracked down and arrested.

Hatata and dozens of other communists were released during Gamal Abdel Nasser's presidency in April 1964. Upon his release, Hatata was among some of the ex-DMNL members who believed Egyptian communists could unite with Nasser's Arab Socialist Union (ASU), the only official party in the country. They viewed it as a progressive and socialist movement. Nasser grew critical of the ASU at the time, claiming it was falling short of mentoring "socialist democracy" in Egypt. In December 1964, the ASU leadership was reorganized with the establishment of a 16-member secretariat-general, of which six were original communists, including Hatata.

== Family ==
Hatata was married to the prominent Egyptian feminist writer Nawal El Saadawi; the couple met in 1964 and were married the same year. They lived in Cairo, but built a small house in Hatata's home village,travelled there a number of times a year. The couple had one son, Atef Hatata, who is a film director in Egypt. From 2006 until his death, Hatata was married to Egyptian writer and film critic Dr. Amal Elgamal (أمـــل الجمل). (21)

== Bibliography ==
- Baraka, Magda (1998), The Egyptian Upper Class Between Revolutions, 1919–1952, Garnet & Ithaca Press, ISBN 9780863722301
- Botman, Selma (1988), The Rise of Egyptian Communism, 1939–1970, Syracuse University Press, ISBN 9780815624431
- Ginat, Rami (2013), Egypt's Incomplete Revolution: Lutfi al-Khuli and Nasser's Socialism in the 1960s, Routledge, ISBN 9781136309885
- Nelson, Cynthia (2000), Situating Globalization: Views from Egypt, Transcript, ISBN 9783933127617
