= Morgenland Festival Osnabrück =

World music festival

The Morgenland Festival Osnabrück is an annual world music festival that started in 2005 in Osnabrück, Germany. The festival is mainly known for its more than 20 editions of musical events in Osnabrück, as well as for guest performances both in Europe and in the Middle East. Apart from performances of traditional, contemporary and experimental music from the wider Middle Eastern region, other art genres, including the visual arts, dance and theatre, have been part of the festival programme.

== History ==
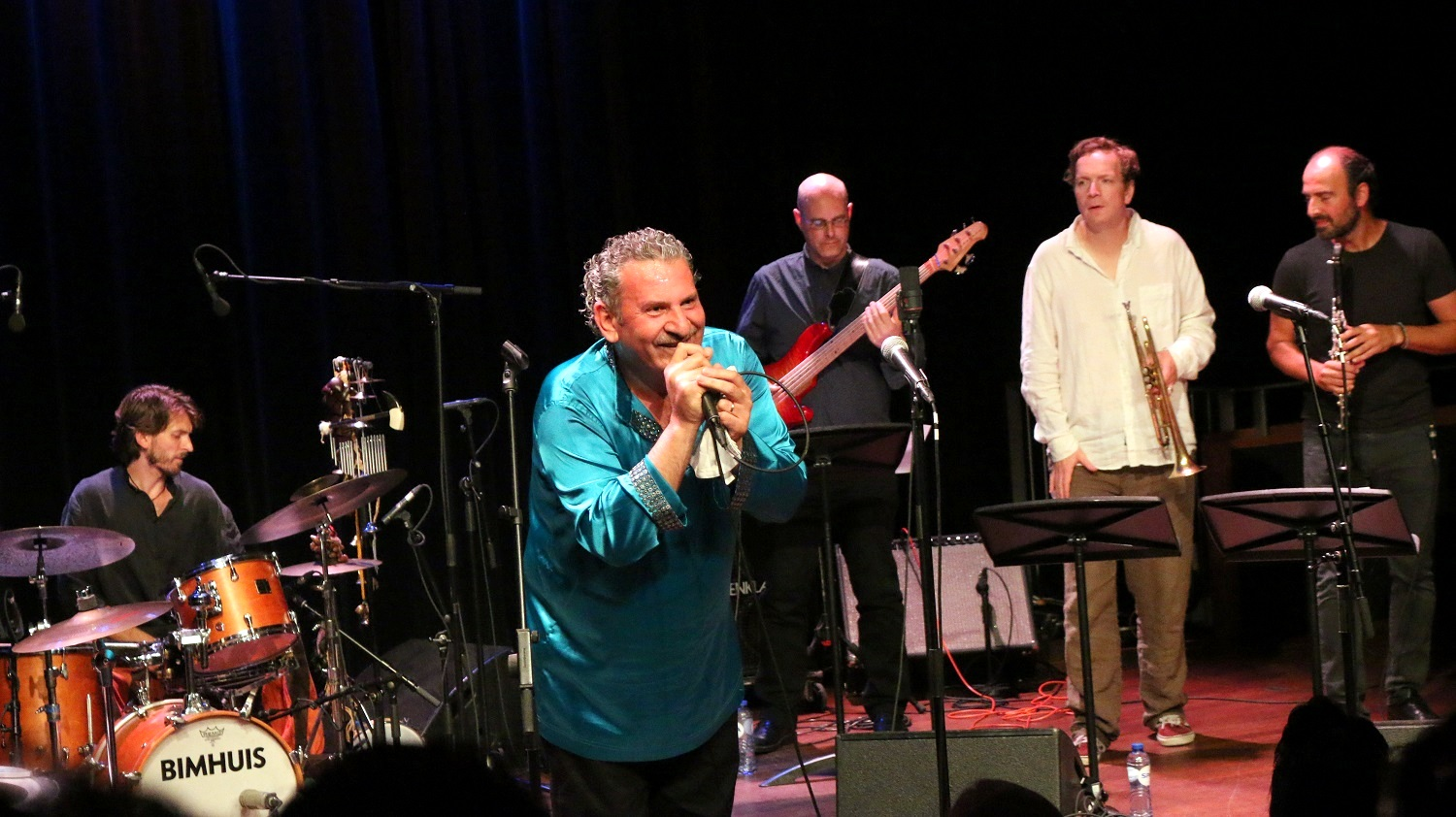
Ibrahim Keivo, Kurdish singer from Syria, and other musicians at Morgenland Festival Osnabrück, 2015

The Morgenland Festival first took place in 2005. Michael Dreyer, initiator and founder of the festival, was the artistic director for the first 20 years. The festival's mission is to challenge traditional perceptions of the wider public of people and culture from the “Orient” and to provide participating artists with time and space to prepare their projects. The musical programme is not prepared as a ready-made concept, but mostly developed during the festival. Further, contemporary compositions have been commissioned especially for their premiere at the festival. Thus, in 2025, cellist Yo-Yo Ma (USA) alongside Kamancheh-playerKayhan Kalhor (Iran) and the NDR Elbphilharmonie Orchestra performed Kalhor’s newly written double concerto "Venus in the Mirror". The piece was commissioned to mark the festival’s 20th anniversary through a collaboration involving the NDR orchestra and the University Musical Society of Ann Arbor in the United States.

Apart from major artists such as Yo-Yo Ma, Alim Qasimov (Azerbaijan), Kayhan Kalhor, Jivan Gasparyan (Armenia), the NDR Bigband (Germany) or Salman Gambarov (Azerbaijan), many artists who were unknown in the West from countries such as Iran, Iraq, Syria, Pakistan, Lebanon, Israel, Egypt, Azerbaijan, Xinjiang or Turkey have performed at the festival. Highlights of the festival have included the participation in 2007 by the Tehran Symphony Orchestra, performing works by Iranian composers as well as by Beethoven, Tchaikovsky and Frank Zappa. This was followed by a return visit of the Osnabrück Symphony Orchestra in Tehran, as well as by a performance of Bach's St John Passion in Tehran by the Osnabrück Youth Choir.

Due to the Corona pandemic, the festival's 2020 edition with its focus on music from the Balkans took place only as virtual concerts on the Internet. For this purpose, the musicians had recorded video sequences in their home countries in locally important places, which were subsequently combined by the festival into short films.

Few years after its start, the festival recorded sold-out concerts and high numbers of visitors: in 2012, it registered 7,000 guests for 14 events. In 2025 Syrian musician and founding member of the Morgenland All Star Band Kinan Azmeh served as artistic director, with Iranian-born curator Shabnam Parvaresh taking over for the 2026/2027 editions.

== Morgenland Chamber Orchestra and Campus ==
The Morgenland Chamber Orchestra has been an integral part of the festival since 2009: German musicians, together with musicians from the invited countries and diverse soloists, rehearse works that are then performed at the opening of the festival. Another integral part of the festival are annual workshops named Morgenland Campus for students from the Music and Art School in Osnabrück and the Barenboim-Said Conservatory in Nazareth. The participating students each spend a week in the host country and rehearse a programme, which is then performed at the end of the festival.

== Morgenland All Star Band ==
The Morgenland All Star Band, founded in 2012 by the festival, included the musicians Dima Orsho (vocals), Kinan Azmeh (clarinet), Ibrahim Keivo (vocals), Salman Gambarov (piano), Ziya Güçkan (violin), Moslem Rahal (Ney), Rony Barrak (Darbuka), Frederik Köster (trumpet), and Bodek Janke (percussion). In 2018, the band played at the Pierre-Boulez-Saal in Berlin as well as in 2015 at the festival in Osnabrück and the Bimhuis concert hall in Amsterdam. Their first album was Dastan (2013). After their concerts in Beirut and Amsterdam in 2015, they released their second album Live in Beirut.

== Venues ==
The local venues have included cultural centres and churches, such as

- Lagerhalle Osnabrück
- St. Marien Church Osnabrück
- St. Peter's Cathedral Osnabrück
- OsnabrückHalle
- Kunsthalle Dominikanerkirche
- Schlossaula of Osnabrück University

== Awards ==
In 2009 the festival founder Michael Dreyer was awarded the Lower Saxony Praetorius Music Award in the category “International Award for Music for Peace”.

== Society of Friends of the Morgenland Festival Osnabrück ==
Since 2009, the charitable organisation Society of Friends of the Morgenland Festival has focused its activities towards collecting funds to finance projects relating to the Festival. They have so far produced a documentary book of photographs (2005–2009) as well as a documentary film, “Eastern Voices”, which is available as Blu-ray and DVD from EuroArts. Furthermore, the Society organizes trips to exhibitions, tours and concerts for its members.

== Discography ==
- 2009 Yulduz Turdieva – The rising star of the East
- 2009 Ibrahim Keivo – The voice of ancient Syria
- 2009 Alim Qasimov & Fargana Qasimova – Intimate Dialogue
- 2009 Salman Gambarov & Bakustic Jazz – Live at Morgenland Festival Osnabrück
- 2010 Shourouk. Soloists of the Morgenland Festival Osnabrück with the NDR Bigband and the Osnabrück Symphony Orchestra (CD)
- 2010 Ayshemgul Memet - The female voice of Uyghur muqams and folk songs
- 2011 Eastern Voices – Morgenland Festival 2006 – 2010
- 2013 Morgenland All Star Band – Dastan
- 2015 Morgenland All Star Band – Live in Beirut
- 2016 Aragats. The Arrival with Jivan Gasparyan Jr., Armen Hyusnunts, Vahagn Hayrapetyan, Alex Baboian all CDs produced by Dreyer.Gaido Musikproduktionen.

== Filmography ==
- 2007 A Passage to Iran, documentary film by Amir Hossein Ahooie
- 2007 Unisono, documentary film by Frank Scheffer & Lucas van Woerkum
- 2008 From Tehran Underground to Osnabrück. One night with the Iranian rock band DA-SH, documentary film by Shahriyar Ahadi
- 2010 Eastern Voices, documentary film by Frank Scheffer and Günter Wallbrecht
- 2010 Road to Osnabrück, documentary film by Mukaddas Mijit

== Commissioned works ==
- Franghiz Alizadeh: Deyishme for Double Bass, Tabla and Orchestra
- Nabil Shehata and Sankha Chatterjee, Kammerakademie Potsdam, conductor David Geringas
- Nader Mashayekhi: fié ma fié III for Voice and Orchestra
- Salar Aghili, Tehran Symphony Orchestra, conductor Nader Mashayekhi
- Saed Haddad: Alternative world-versions for Piano and Orchestra
- Saleem Abboud Ashkar, Münchner Rundfunkorchester, conductor Frank Cramer
- Cymin Samawatie: Vocal Diary. Inspired by works of the Iranian painter Golnar Tabibzadeh
- Nader Mashayekhi: moulana for Voice and Orchestra
- Salar Aghili, Münchner Rundfunkorchester, conductor Frank Cramer
- Nouri Iskandar: Alkhareef (Autumn) - Am Rande der Kälte
- Ibrahim Keivo (Voice), Morgenland Chamber Orchestra, conductor Nader Mashayekhi
- Kinan Azmeh: Fantasy in three characters
- Kinan Azmeh and Ibrahim Keivo, Osnabrück Symphony Orchestra, conductor Hermann Bäumer

== Reception ==
Reports about the Morgenland Festival have appeared maily in German news media, including the local press, Süddeutsche Zeitung, Die Tageszeitung, Deutschlandfunk Kultur, as well as in music magazines Jazz thing, Jazzzeitung and the world music magazine Folker.World. One of these remarked the festival's successful “musical cooperation across all linguistic, geographical and historical boundaries.” The portal Qantara has issued several articles about the Morgenland Festival and its respective programmes. In May 2021 the BBC Music Magazine published a report about the festival written by music journalist Simon Broughton.
