= Parvaresh =

Parvaresh may refer to:

- Ali-Akbar Parvaresh (1942–2013), Iranian politician
- Shabnam Parvaresh (born 1983), Iranian musician
- Parvaresh (newspaper)
