= Innenstadt (Osnabrück district) =

Coordinates: 52.2667°N 8.0500°E

The Innenstadt (city centre) is the central district of the city of Osnabrück in Lower Saxony, Germany; its population is roughly 8,300.

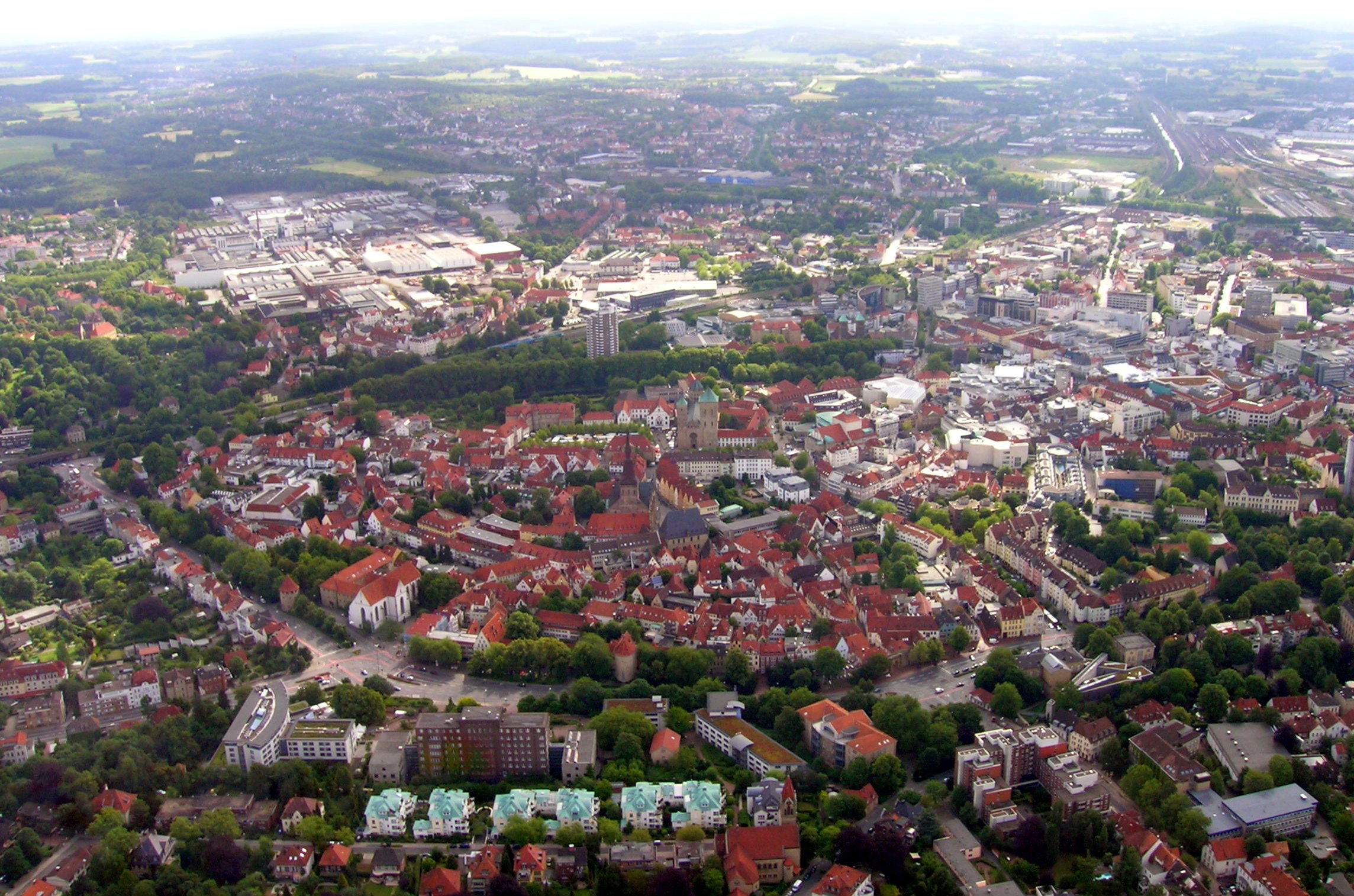
Aerial view of the Innenstadt

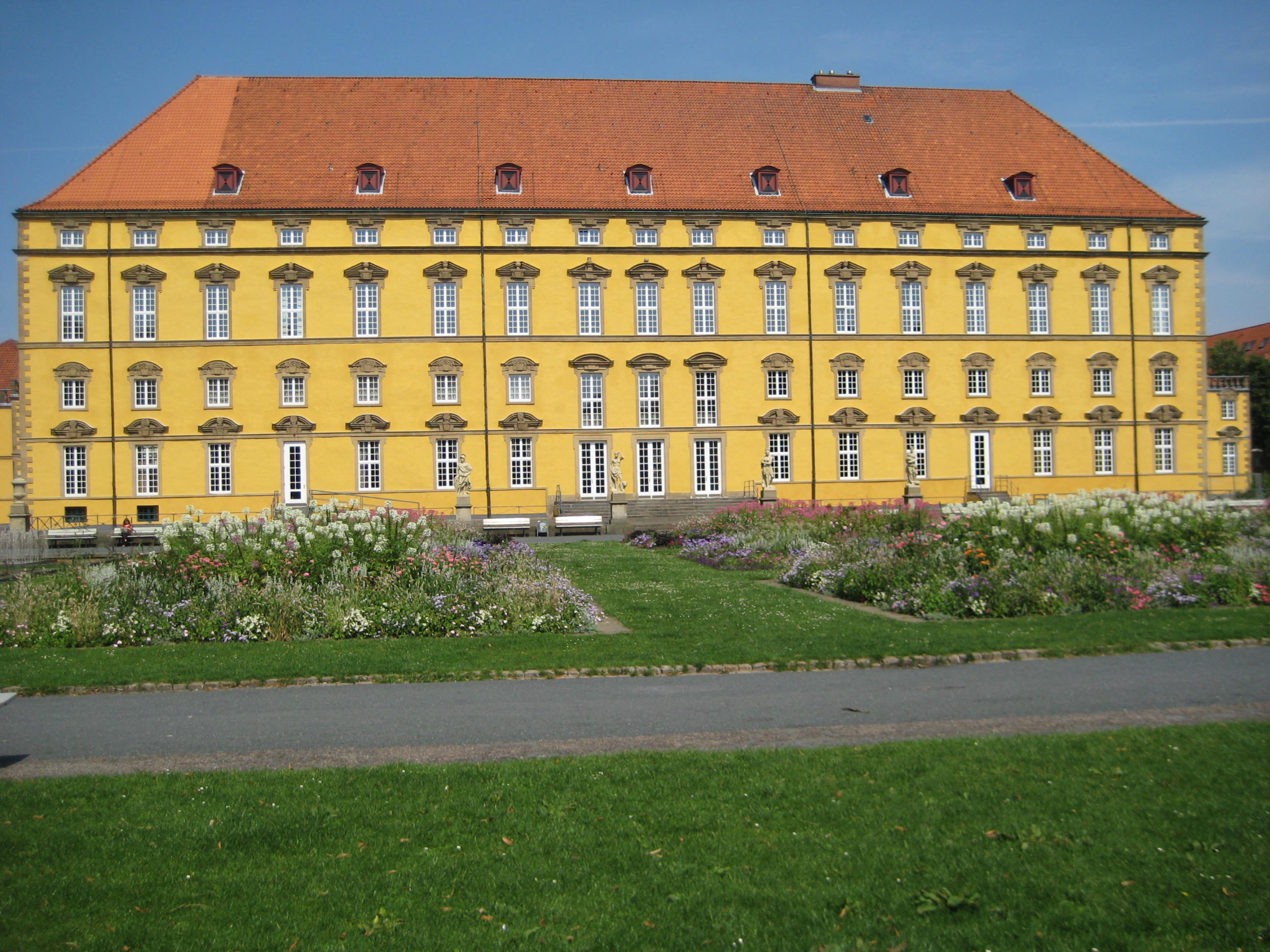
Schloss Osnabrück (Osnabrück Castle), today the University of Osnabrück's head office

The Innenstadt comprises the medieval Altstadt (old town) and Neustadt (new town), which were united in 1306. The Altstadt developed around the town's three medieval churches, which initially constituted small parishes in the local area: the Lutheran Kirche St. Marien (Church of St. Mary), the Lutheran Kirche St. Katharinen (Church of St. Catherine) and the Dom St. Peter (St. Peter's Cathedral), which was the seat of the bishop. The Neustadt developed around the Kirche St. Johann (Church of St. John).

Today the Gymnasialkirche and the Herz-Jesu-Kirche (Church of the Sacred Heart) are also part of the Innenstadt, as well as two mosques. The Schloss Osnabrück, formerly the residence of the local prince-bishop and today the head office of the University of Osnabrück, is also located here. This district is the economic heart of the city. The retail sector, with many outlets located along the extensive pedestrian precinct, is particularly prominent. Service industries are also present in the Innenstadt, including gastronomic outlets and hotels, public authorities and educational institutions.

94% of Osnabrück's Altstadt was destroyed during World War II.

The Innenstadt is connected to the national and regional rail networks by the Osnabrück Hauptbahnhof (main station) and the Altstadt station (formerly Osnabrück-Hasetor). Another station used to operate at the Wittekindplatz: Osnabrück-West, also known as Osnabrück-Hannoverscher Bahnhof. The establishment of an Osnabrück-Johannistor train station to connect the Neustadt area has been a topic of discussion since the year 1895.

The Innenstadt was also connected by three tram lines (first opened in 1906 and gradually expanded over time): tram line 1 from the Hauptbahnhof to the Heger Friedhof (Heger Cemetery) via Hauptpost and Nikolaiort, tram line 2 from Schölerberg to Haste via Johannistor (Rosenplatz), Neumarkt, Nikolaiort and Hasetor, and tram line 3 from Martiniplatz/Heinrich-Lübke-Platz to Schinkel via Neumarkt and Hauptpost.

Present-day urban planning continues to consider the possibility of better connecting the Innenstadt area by means of an inner-city tram or light rail network.

== Sources ==
- M+E (Eds.), Osnabrück (Osnabruck, 1976)
- Neue Osnabrücker Zeitung, 2007–2010
- Spühr and Jeanmaire, Die Osnabrücker Straßenbahn (1980)
