= Benedikt Jahnel =

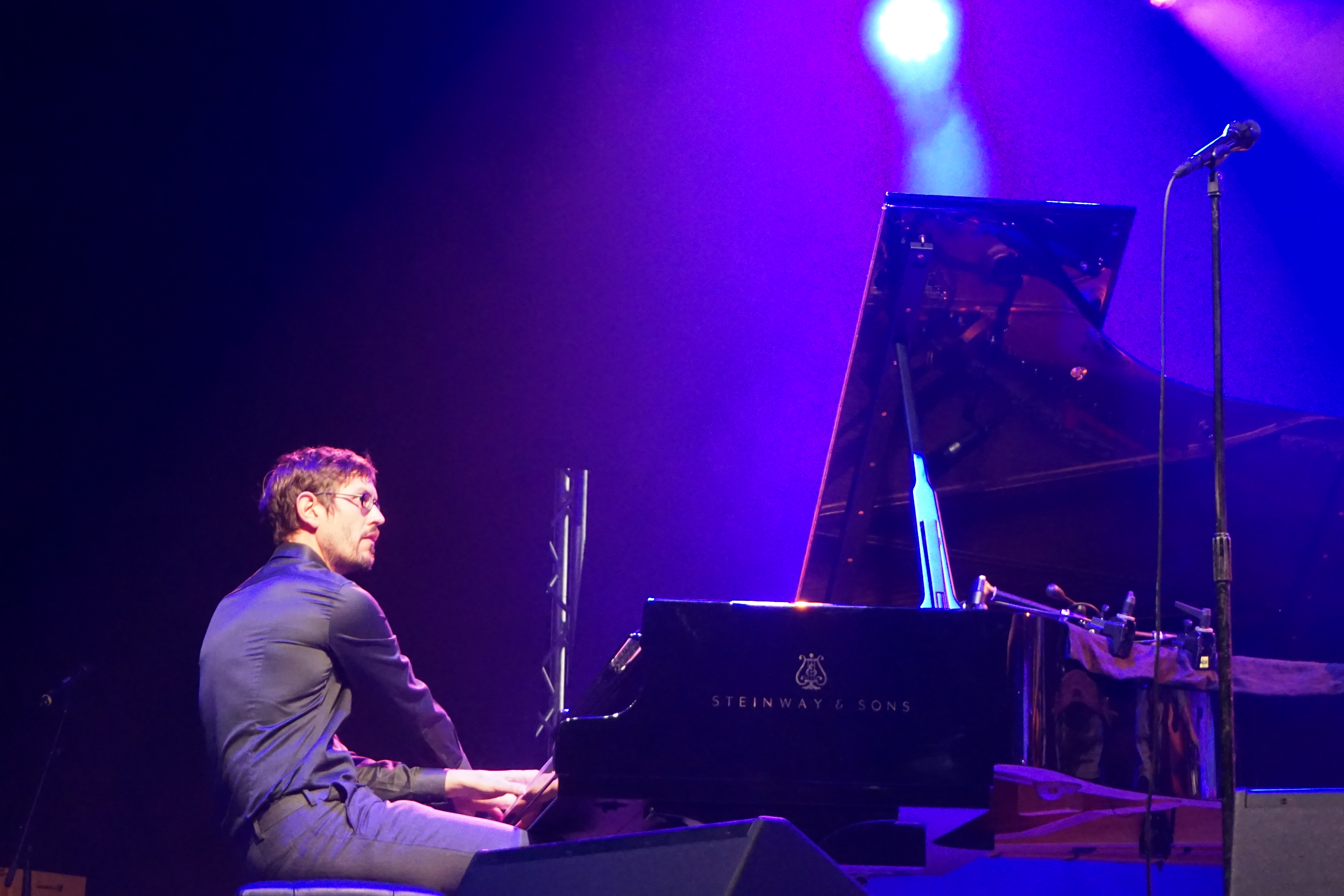
- Benedikt Jahnel at concert at JazzBaltica

Background information
- Born: 28 May 1980 (age 45); Saint-Martin d'Hères, France
- Genres: Classical, jazz, avant-garde jazz
- Occupations: Musician, composer, band leader, mathematician
- Instrument: Piano
- Labels: Material Records, ACT, ECM
- Website: www.benejahnel.de

Benedikt Jahnel (born 28 May 1980 in Saint-Martin d'Hères, France) is a German jazz pianist, composer, bandleader and mathematician.

== Biography ==
Jahnel is known for his nuanced, classically influenced jazz recordings. When he was young he took classical piano lessons and gained jazz experience by playing in the Bavarian and German Youth Big Bands. He continued his studying at Berlin University of the Arts under David Friedman and Hubert Nuss, and later at New York City College studying with Kenny Werner, Jean-Michel Pilc, and John Patitucci. After graduation, he performed with Phil Woods, Johannes Enders, Frank Möbus, Wolfgang Muthspiel, Dave Liebman, John Abercrombie, Clarence Penn, and Dan Weiss, Steve Davis. Along with his solo work, he has played and recorded regularly with the jazz ensemble Max.Bab and he is also a longtime member of vocalist Cymin Samawatie's Cyminology group. As a leader, Jahnel made his debut with his trio featuring bassist Antonio Miguel and drummer Owen Howard on 2008's Modular Concepts for Material Records. Another trio effort, Equilibrium (2012), followed in 2012, this time for ECM. In 2017, Jahnel delivered his third trio recording, again on ECM, The Invariant, which found him drawing inspiration from his love of mathematics.

Jahnel completed his PhD in mathematical physics on Gibbs measures in 2014 at the Ruhr University Bochum. Since 2015 he has been a researcher at the Weierstrass Institute Berlin. His main research interests are Gibbs measures and phase transitions, for example in connection with Bose-Einstein condensation, interacting particle systems with applications in the analysis of virus spreading in random graphs, as well as mobile ad hoc networks. The book "Probabilistic Methods in Telecommunications", which he wrote together with Wolfgang König, was published in 2020. He has been compared to the late Swedish pianist Esbjörn Svensson.

== Discography (in selection) ==
=== Solo albums ===
With Benedikt Jahnel Trio

- 2008: Modular Concepts (Material Records)
- 2012: Equilibrium (ECM)
- 2017: The Invariant (ECM)

=== Collaborations ===
With Cyminology

- 2005: Per Se (Double Moon Records)
- 2006: Bemun (Double Moon Records)
- 2009: Niyaayesh (ECM)
- 2009: As Ney (ECM)
- 2011: Saburi (ECM)
- 2015: Phoenix (ECM)

With Peter Ehwald & Benedikt Jahnel Doublequartet

- 2007: Music For String Quartet And Jazz Quartet (Konnex Records)

With Max.Bab

- 2007: Going Home (Embab, Rough Trade Arvato)
- 2009: Inner Orbit (ACT)
