= Lagerhalle =

Coordinates: 52.2762°N 8.0394°E

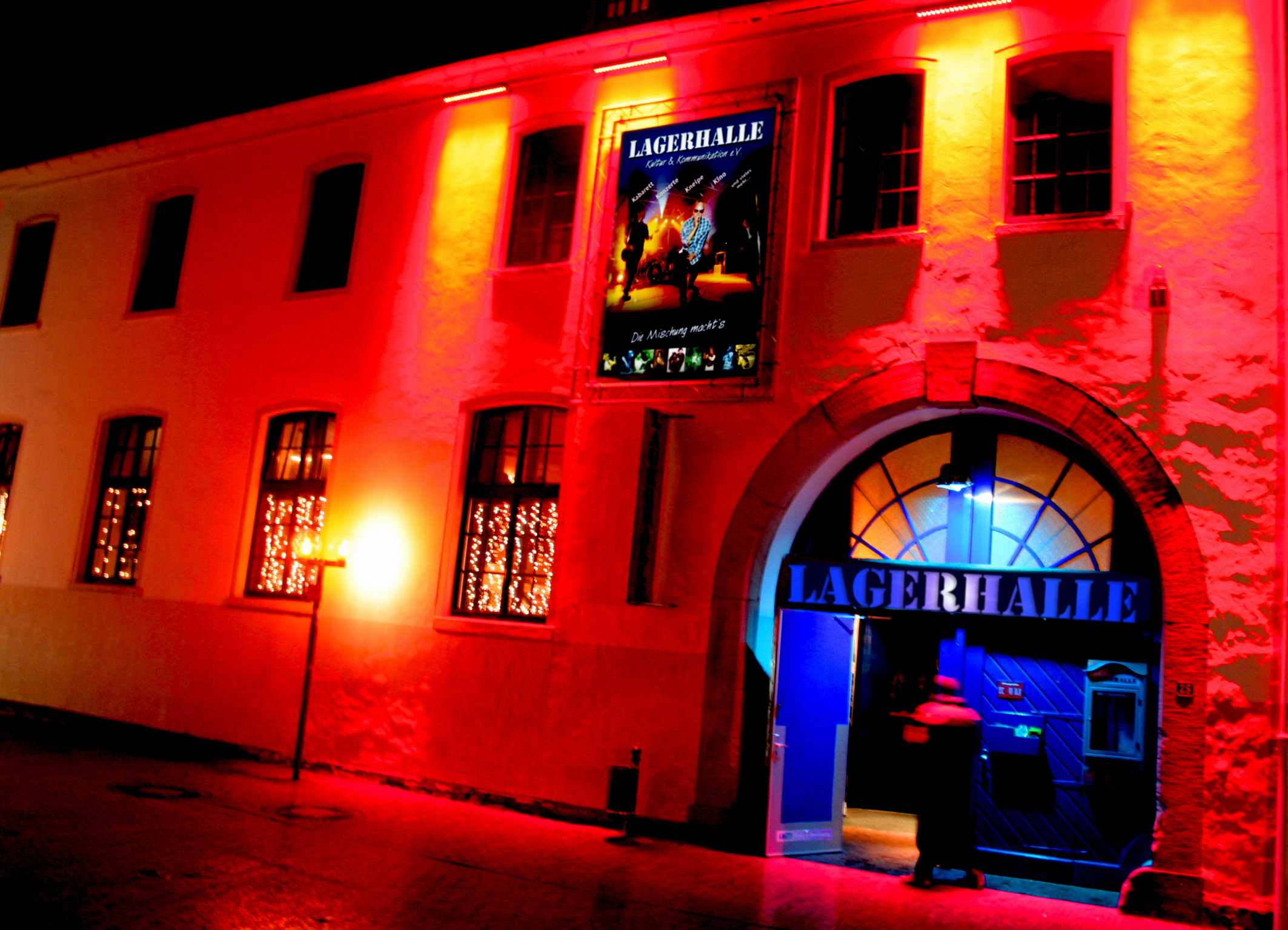
The Lagerhalle at night

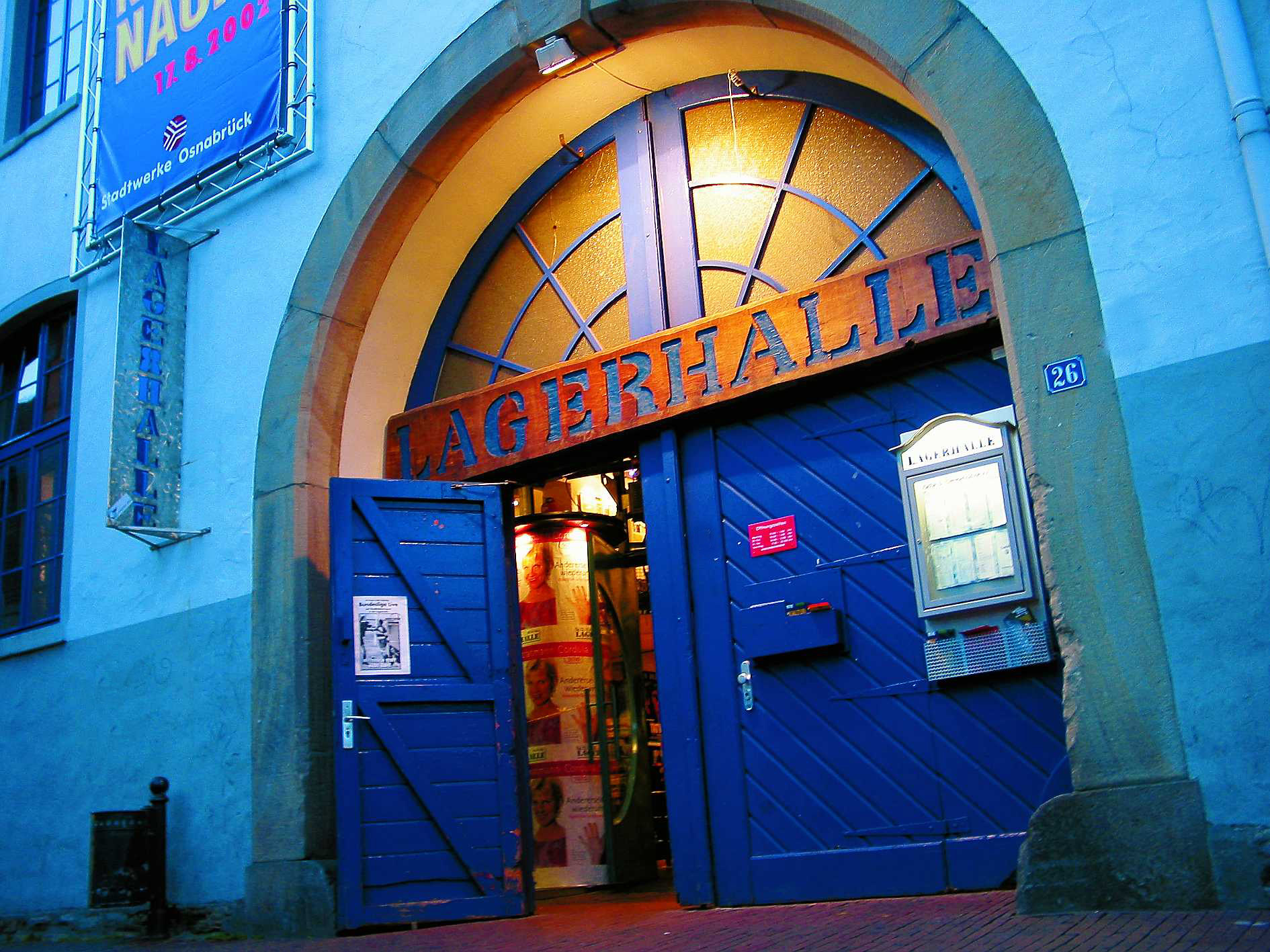
Main entrance to the Lagerhalle (full name: Kultur- und Kommunikationszentrum Lagerhalle)

The Lagerhalle in Osnabrück is one of the many communal cultural centres founded in Germany during the 1970s. It was established in 1976 in the building formerly belonging to the ironware company Richter, in close proximity to the Felix-Nussbaum-Haus museum and Waterloo-Tor memorial in Osnabrück's historic town centre. It is run as a socio-cultural centre by a non-profit association on behalf of the city council, and is financed by revenues made from its in-house gastronomy along with public subsidies. Its management states that around 500 events take place in the rooms of the Lagerhalle each year. It also hosts Osnabrück's Cabaret and Morgenland festivals.

== History ==
In 1972, the ironware wholesalers Richter moved their warehouse from Osnabrück's old town centre to a nearby industrial area. Towards the end of 1973 a citizens’ initiative made up of artists, arts enthusiasts and craftspeople took form and developed a concept for the new usage of the Richter warehouse: as a communications centre and arthouse.

The group presented its concept to the city administration in February 1974, initiating a dialogue with then-Lord Mayor Ernst Weber regarding a possible acquisition of the building by the city. The Richter family demanded 550,000 DM for the building, with an additional condition that its future usage should not be contrary to the character of the Heger Tor area.

As the suggestion to use the Lagerhalle as a recreational centre had met with the approval of local government as well as councilors, a concept was developed for the building's further usage. After the citizens’ initiative had put forward its proposals to the local management committee, the culture committee passed a positive verdict on the concept in November that year.

On 23 December 1974, Osnabrück city council managed to acquire the building at a price of 465,000 DM. In the space of 18 months, the former warehouse was converted into a cultural centre. The city council made all space within the building freely available and assumed responsibility for all running costs. Responsibilities for the programme and – to the greatest possible extent – employment of staff were handed over to the "Lagerhalle-Verein" (Lagerhalle Association) which had arisen from the former citizens' initiative.

The Lagerhalle Osnabrück was a co-founder of the Bundesvereinigung Soziokultureller Zentren (Federal Association of Socio-Cultural Centres), established in 1979.

== Cultural centre ==
Among other things, the Lagerhalle's programme features arthouse cinema, theatre, readings, cabaret, events for children, lectures and concerts. Numerous rooms are made available by the Lagerhalle for projects, seminars, other creative activities, public workshops and various other events – such as a 200 m² hall which can accommodate 250 seated or 450 unseated guests, the Spitzboden room on the top floor, the Empore (gallery), a crafts room and six seminar rooms.

The building is one of a group of structural works registered as cultural monuments in accordance with 4 of the Lower Saxony Heritage Protection Law (Niedersächsischen Denkmalschutzgesetzes, abbreviated to NDSchG).

== Cinema ==
The Filmkunstkino (Art Film Cinema) at the Lagerhalle is the venue of the European Media Art Festival, the Unabhängige FilmFest Osnabrück (Osnabrück Independent Filmfest) and the New Japanese Film Festival.

In 2005, 2008, 2009 and 2010 the cinema was awarded the Kinoprogrammpreis Niedersachsen/Bremen (Lower Saxony/Bremen Cinema Programming Prize) in the non-commercial theatre category, on account of its outstanding film programmes.

It is a member of the Bundesverband kommunale Filmarbeit (Federal Association of Non-Commercial Cinemas), the Hauptverband Deutscher Filmtheater (Association of German Film Theatres) and the Arbeitsgemeinschaft Kino – Gilde deutscher Filmkunsttheater (Cinema Association – Guild of German Arthouse Cinemas).

== Literature ==
- Lagerhalle e. V. Osnabrück (ed)., Lagerhalle. Das Buch. Die ersten 10 Jahre. Berichte und Ansichten aus einem Kommunikationszentrum (Osnabrück, 1986) (ISBN 3-926365-00-5)
- Steinwascher, G. (ed.), Geschichte der Stadt Osnabrück (2006) (ISBN 3-88926-0071)
- Tast, H-J., 25jhr.emaf. Ein Vierteljahrhundert im medialen Umbruch (Schellerten, 2012) (ISBN 978-3-88842-039-9)
