= St. Mary's Church, Osnabrück =

Church in Osnabrück, Germany

Coordinates: 52°16′40″N 8°02′30″E

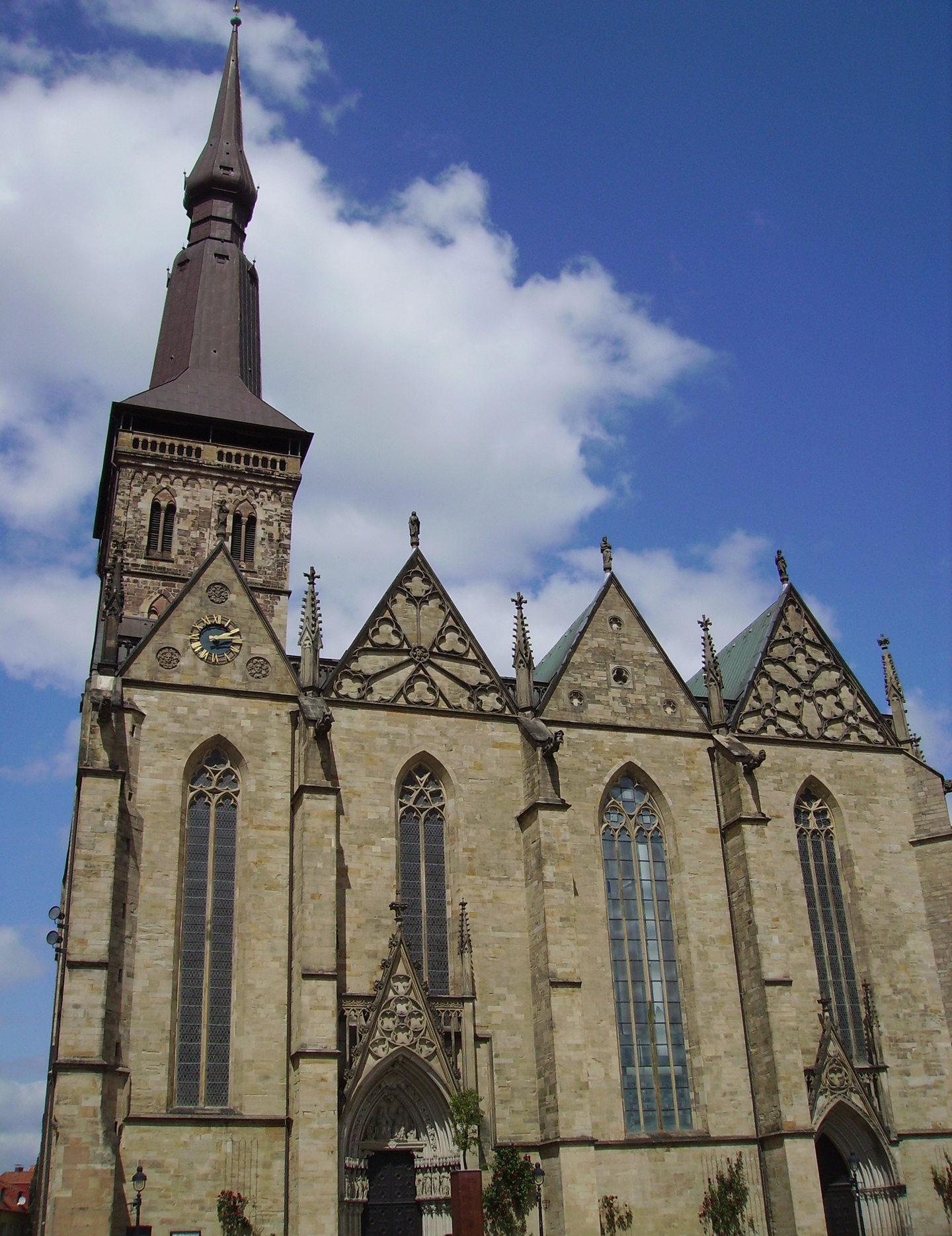
St. Marien (St. Mary's Church) in Osnabrück, viewed from the Marktplatz (market place).

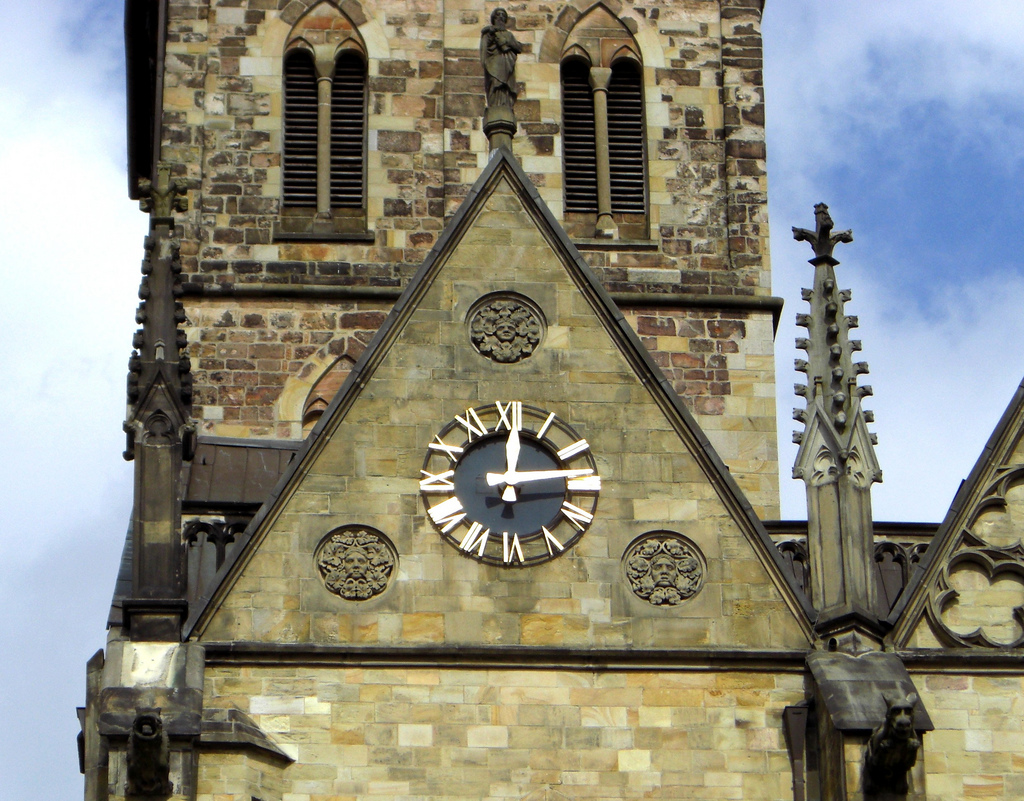
Church clock of St. Marien in Osnabrück

St. Marien (St. Mary's Church) is a Lutheran parish and market church in Osnabrück, Germany. It is one of the most artistically and historically significant buildings in the North German city. A previous Romanesque church was mentioned in records as early as 1177. However, the history of the church's construction began some time before it was first mentioned in writing. Archaeological traces suggest the existence of a predecessor building in the 10th century. Construction of the Gothic hall church which exists today started in the 13th century and was completed between 1430 and 1440.

The St. Marien church has a complex architectural history. Over time, extensive restorations have enabled archaeological excavations which have contributed considerably to a reconstruction of the building's history. The existence of at least three predecessor buildings has thereby been established.

As Osnabrück's oldest town church, it has a central location in the city. The Marienkirche is located directly on the market place, next to the Stadtwaage (city weighing house) and the town hall. Along with the cathedral, St. Katharinen (St. Catherine's) and St. Johann (St. John's), it is one of the four medieval churches which encompass the Innenstadt (city centre) of Osnabrück.

== Construction history ==
=== Excavations ===
Before reconstruction of the Marienkirche started from 1950 onwards following severe damage caused by incendiary bombs during World War II, a series of excavations took place to investigate the building's earlier architectural history. With the modernisation of the building's heating systems in 1958 as well as internal and external renovation work from 1987 to 1992, there arose further opportunities to conduct research into the architectural history of St. Marien.

The excavations were carried out by the federal curator of Lower Saxony under the scientific supervision of the then-curators Roswitha Poppe and Hans Roggenkamp. The research work received support from the municipal office for the preservation of historical monuments, the Amt für Bau- und Kunstpflege (Office for the Maintenance of Art and Buildings) of the Evangelical Church in Osnabrück, and ultimately from master sculptor Werner Paetzke.

The extensive excavations managed to establish the existence of at least three predecessor buildings.

=== From the predecessor buildings to today’s Marienkirche ===
The oldest predecessor church was a hall building, constructed on a sandy island-like knoll during the 10th century. This is the oldest predecessor building of St. Marien and is regarded as its architectural origin. As the construction project was linked to the establishment of a market, it can be assumed that the initial purpose of the building was for it to be a market church for the city of Osnabrück. The single-nave long building, without a transept but with an almost semicircular apsis, was positioned before an open, two-storied vestibule to the west. A salient feature is the robust stonework of the roofed hall with a width of 2.3 m, suggesting it functioned as part of a fortified church. The form of the ground plan along with the highly retracted interior of the chancel point to late Carolingian or early Saxon-era designs.

The second predecessor building of Osnabrück's Marienkirche was constructed on the foundations of the first church in the 11th century. Once again there featured a single-nave roofed hall with a semicircular apsis. However, this time a 14-metre-high (46 ft) tower with a vaulted upper floor and basement was also constructed on the west side of the church. Materials from the previous church were used to construct the rectangular western tower.

The most recent of the three predecessor churches was built during the 12th century. The single-nave roofed hall was expanded to include two narrow side aisles. A three-aisled basilica with three semicircular altar apses and no transept was built. The core masonry of the western tower and the tower building are the only parts of this building which remain today.

During the 13th and 14th centuries the three-aisled basilica was transformed into a Gothic hall church. Four more storeys were added to the western tower and the chancel took on a rectangular shape. The subsequent conversion of the rectangular chancel into a basilica chancel around 1430-40 brought work on the Marienkirche to a temporary end.

The damage caused during World War II was repaired concurrently alongside the archaeological excavations; the repair work was finished by 1950. The reconstruction work, led by local architect Max H. Berling, also led to changes in the features of the church as well as the colouration, most of which was done during a renovation in 1901.

== Building description ==
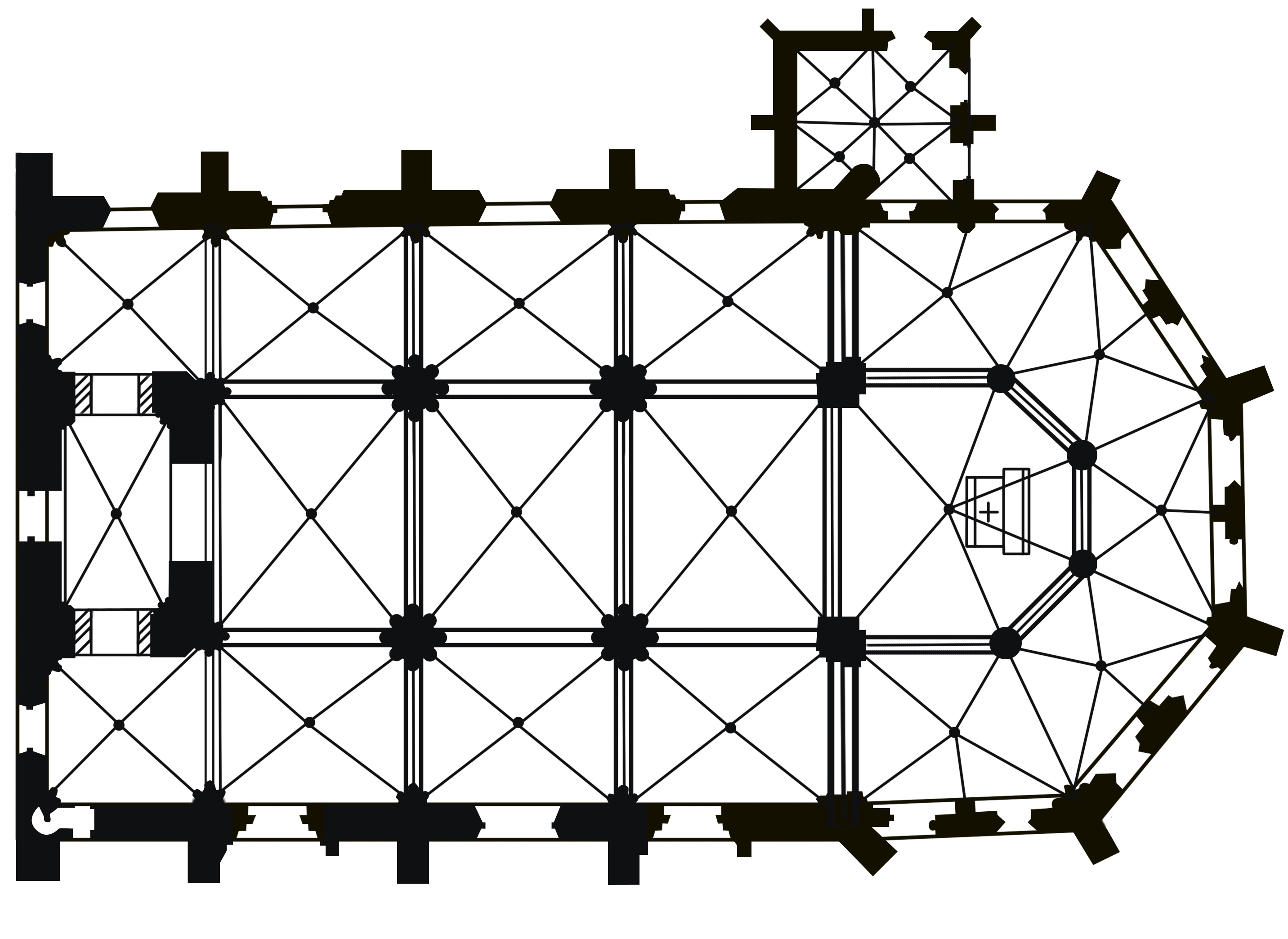
Ground plan of the Marienkirche

=== Ground plan ===
St. Marien is a three-aisled hall church without a transept. The main aisle is three bays long. The bays in the central nave are slightly rectangular. Both side aisles are four bays deep, these having a slight oblong shape. The central nave is separated from the side aisles by archways consisting of large compound piers. The extension of the side aisles by one bay each enables the inclusion of the western tower in the interior architecture. On the eastern side, the nearly-quadratic hall is appended by the polygon-shaped basilican chancel. Attached to the chancel on the north side is the quadratic sacristy, covering four bays. This has four arches, all buttressed by one central compound pier. The Gothic hall is overlaid by ribbed vaults. The nave is 20.56 metres long in total, which represents only a slight difference from the length and width measurements (roughly 25.5 and 24.5 metres respectively). This gives the nave an almost-cubical shape. The central nave is only slightly wider than the side aisles. This results in merely a weak accentuation of the longitudinal axis of the church. The bays of the side aisles counteract this slight longitudinal alignment by opening up their broadsides to the central nave, thus emphasising the lateral alignment. This gives the impression of undirected space. St. Marien is thus characterised by the overall appearance of its nave.

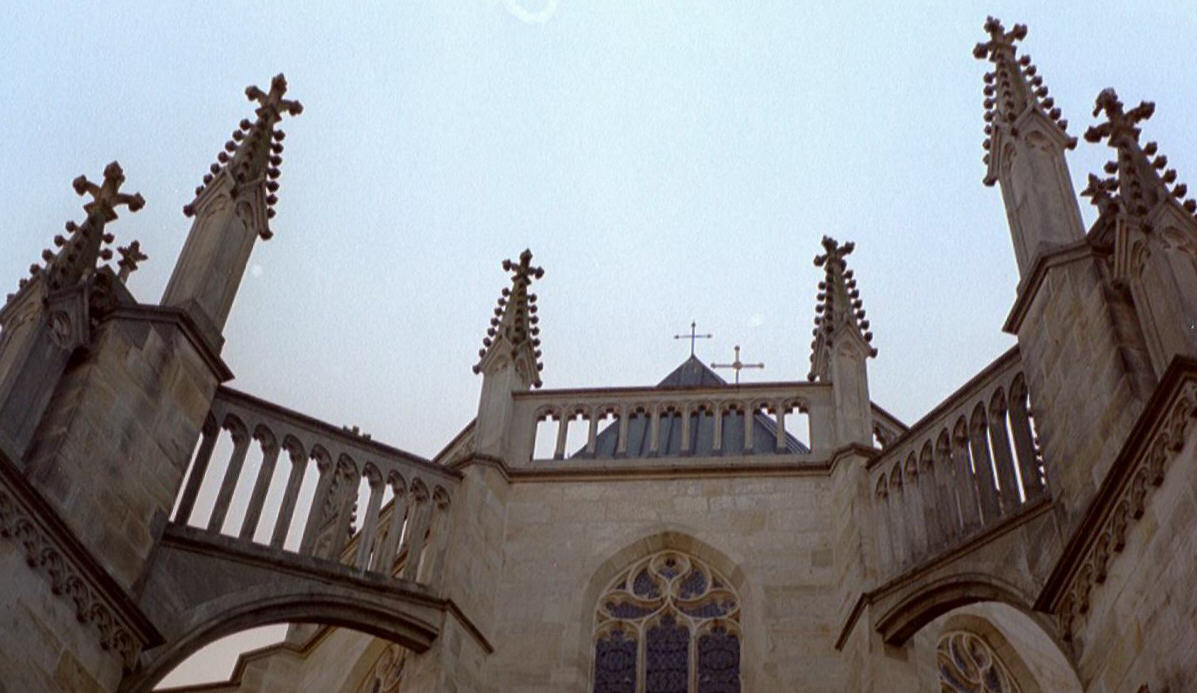
Eastern side of St. Marien in Osnabrück

=== Exterior ===
The western tower stands imposingly over the roof of St. Marien, representing the old market church. The design of the north and south sides of the Marienkirche is symmetrical. A total of four portals enable entry into St. Marien, two each on the north and south sides. The market place is characterised by the visible side of the church, featuring four gables crested with tracery and narrow elevated lancet windows. Sandstone figures are positioned on the gables. The buttresses – typical elements of Gothic architecture - help divide the visible side of the church into four vertical zones. The buttresses run in pinnacles with waterspouts between the four gables. There are two portals on this side. One side portal and the Brautportal, the main entrance to the Marienkirche. Buttresses (along with flying buttresses) and balustrades characterise the image of the chancel. The exterior of the chancel underlies a bisection emerging from the ambulatory and the clerestory.

The buttress of the Marienkirche in Osnabrück is given a dynamic design by the pinnacles as well as the neo-Gothic balustrades. This contrasts with the less decorated forms of nearby St. Peter's Cathedral as well as the simpler neighbouring market houses.

=== Brautportal ===
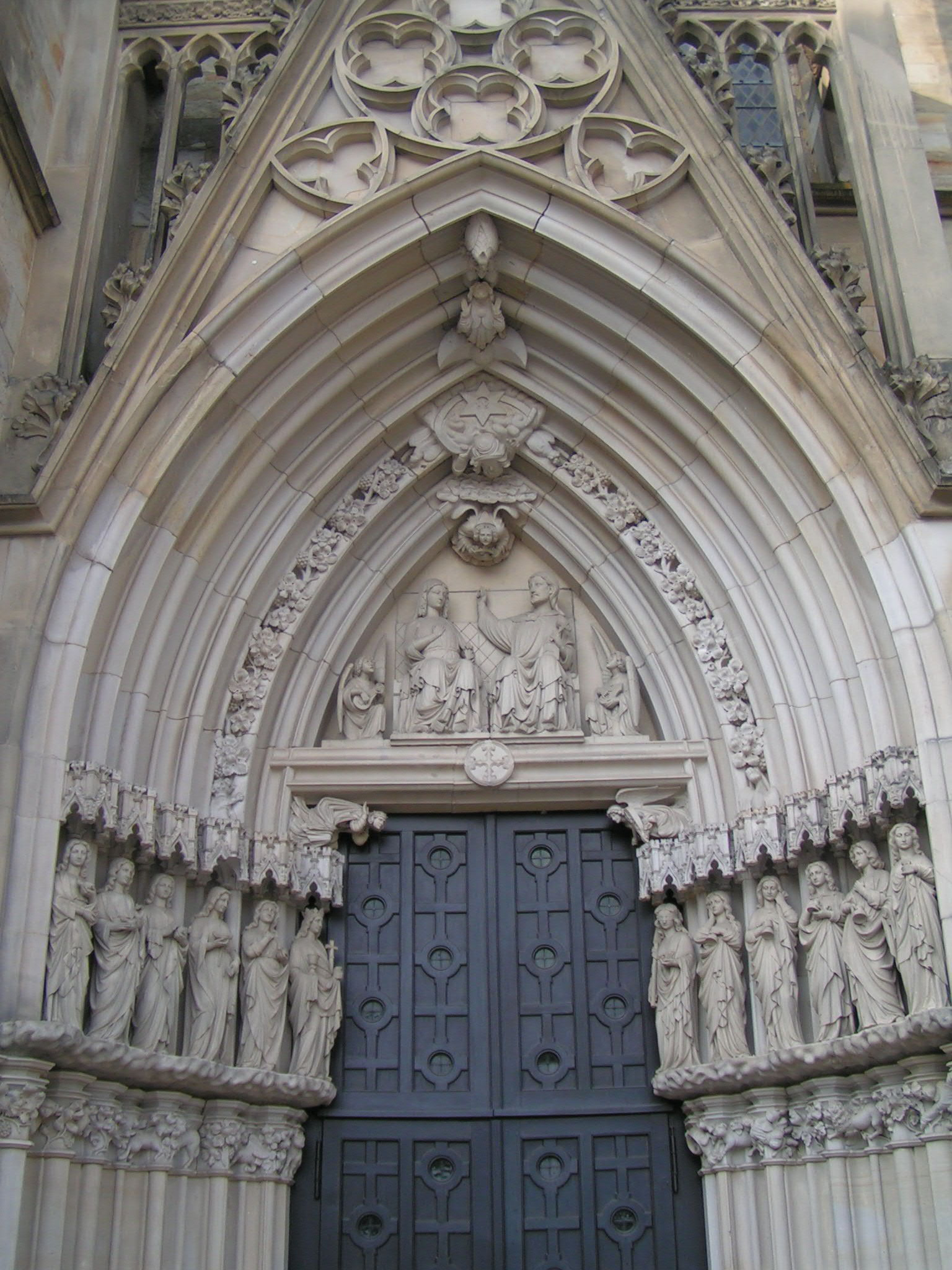
The Brautportal of St. Marien in Osnabrück

The Brautportal is located on the south side of St. Marien. The opulent decorations and the high wimperg signify the Brautportal's status as the main entrance to the Marienkirche. The figures around its frame represent the Clever and the Foolish Virgins. On the left-hand side are the figures of the five Clever Virgins, led by the “Ecclesia”, and on the right are the four Foolish ones, led by the “Synagoge”. (See Ecclesia and Synagoga for more information.) The leaders of the groups standing on the columns represent the New and the Old Covenants. The biblical allegory of the Clever and the Foolish Virgins is often to be found on sacred buildings in Germany. On the arch of the Brautportal – the tympanum – the Coronation of the Virgin is portrayed. Tracery ornamentation on the wimperg and an open-work tracery balustrade frame this work. The Coronation of the Virgin, along with the allegory of the Clever and Foolish Virgins, are replicas from the second half of the 19th century. The originals from the early 14th century are at Osnabrück's Kulturgeschichtliches Museum (Museum of Cultural History).

=== Interior ===
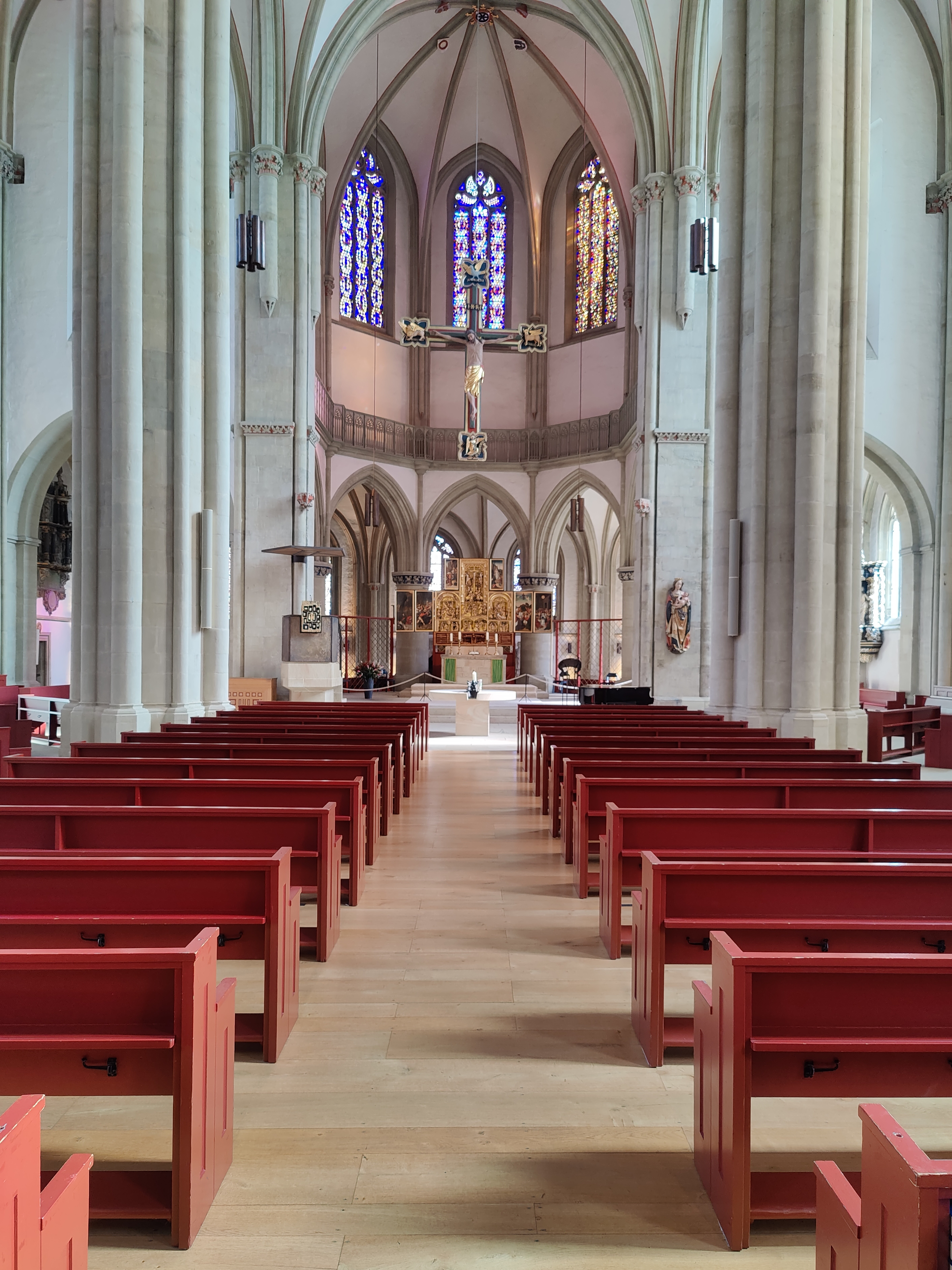
Interior (2022)

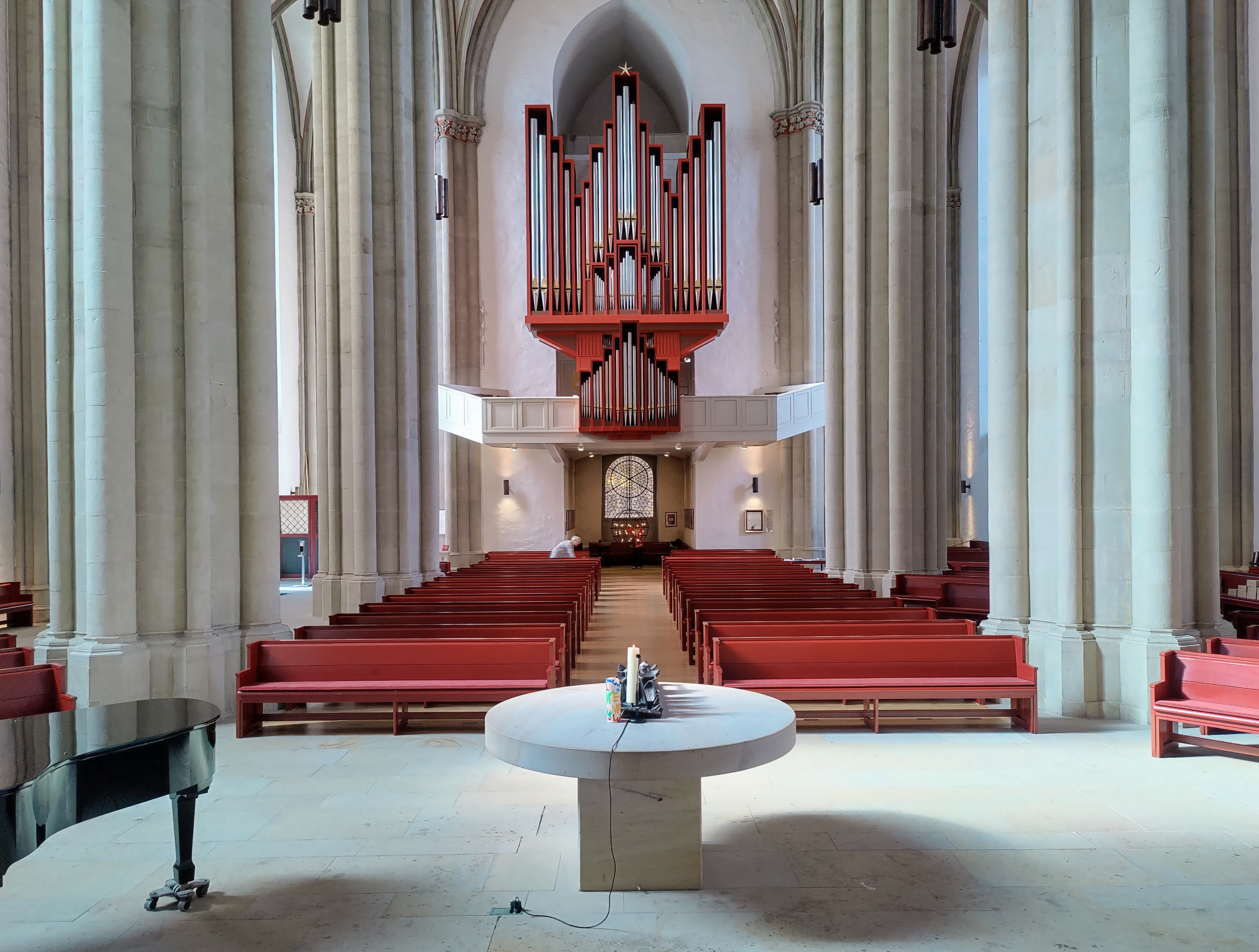
Interior, view of the Flentrop organ

The interior of St. Marien can be accessed via the four portals. The Gothic hall has a compact, undirected appearance. This consistent spatial impression causes misleading diagonal perspectives. The lack of a transept intensifies the feeling of closeness, as well as the effect of uniformity. The ribbed vaults of the three naves – all of equal height – are supported by sturdy compound piers. The tops of the vaults reach heights of 21 metres. The tall compound piers are based on those in the cathedrals of Minden and Paderborn. The naturalistic capital ornamentation of the compound piers in the Marienkirche bears a resemblance to the foliated capitals at the Elisabethkirche in Marburg and at Minden Cathedral.

Inside the church, the chancel is characterised by a tripartite division. Along with the low-lying ambulatory the area follows on to a small triforium gallery. The clerestory with tripartite tracery windows stands at the end. The contrast between the high-reaching clerestory and the low-lying ambulatory gives the room arrangement and vision guidance a particular dynamic. Simultaneously the low apertures to the ambulatory emphasise the smallness of the hall. The chancel vault is adorned with the crest of Bishop Erich von Hoya and other heraldic panels. The continuation of the breadth of the nave into the chancel along with the clerestory over the arches – only separated by a narrow triforium – give the impression of a spacious and bright hall.

== Features ==
St. Marien contains several significant decorative features from various workshops and periods of history: the colourful Madonna on the south side of the ambulatory dating from the early 16th century, epitaphs featuring testimonies and locally made Renaissance and Baroque sculptures dating from the 16th and 18th centuries, the winged altar from Antwerp also dating from the early 16th century, the triumphal rood from the late 13th century and the 16th century baptismal font.

=== Triumphal rood ===
The triumphal rood from the late 13th century is one of the oldest decorative features in the church. It is suspended from the chancel vault. It portrays the body of Christ as crowned with thorns in the Gothic “Dreinageltypus” style – portrayed also with a nail through the feet to increase the sense of suffering. His knees are lightly tightened and the arms are stretched out almost horizontally. Mary and John – the secondary figures who are normally installed to the right and left of the crucifix – are merely shown as stone consoles on the pillars.

=== Winged altar ===
The main altar was produced in Antwerp in 1520 and is composed of a shrine with painted wings. On a total of 12 painted panels on the front and reverse sides of the retable, the viewer is presented with the story of Christ through to his resurrection and the Outpouring of the Holy Spirit on Whitsun. The carved central section of the main altar portrays the Annunciation, the Visitation, the birth, the Adoration, the Circumcision and the presentation in the Temple on six small alcoves. In three discourses the Passion of Jesus is thereby presented: the bearing of the cross, the crucifixion and the Descent from the Cross. These sorts of altars from Antwerp were very widespread across northern Germany during the late 16th century. The predella of the main altar's retable, destroyed in 1945 during the war, was created around 1390 as a self-standing, two-pronged altar retable by the Master of the Berswordt retable, a painter associated with French art during the 1380s whose workshop was assumed to be in Cologne.

=== Organ ===
The organ of St. Marien was built in 1967 by Dutch organ builders Flentrop and underwent extensive renovation in 1998. The slider chest instrument has 47 registers across four manual stops and pedals. The stop and key actions are operated manually. The Brustwerk is fitted with a threshold mechanism.

I Rückpositiv C–g^{3}
1.	Prinzipal	8′
2.	Hohlflöte	8′
3.	Octave	4′
4.	Rohrflöte	4′
5.	Superoctave	2′
6.	Flachflöte	2′
7.	Quinte	1^{1}/_{3}′
8.	Sesquialter II	2^{2}/_{3}′
9.	Scharff III–IV
10.	Dulcian	16′
11.	Krummhorn	8′
	Tremulant

II Hauptwerk C–g^{3}
12.	Prästant	16′
13.	Prinzipal	8′
14.	Octave	4′
15.	Quinte	2^{2}/_{3}′
16.	Superoctave	2′
17.	Mixtur IV–V
18.	Trompete	16′
19.	Trompete	8′

III Oberwerk C–g^{3}
27.	Rohrflöte	8′
28.	Quintatön	8′
29.	Prinzipal	4′
30.	Spitzflöte	4′
31.	Nasat	2^{2}/_{3}′
32.	Waldflöte	2′
33.	Terz	1^{3}/_{5}′
34.	Mixtur IV
35.	Trompete	8′
	Tremulant

IV Brustwerk C–g^{3}
20.	Gedackt	8′
21.	Gedacktflöte	4′
22.	Prinzipal	2′
23.	Sifflöte	1′
24.	Zimbel II
25.	Regal	16′
26.	Vox Humana	8′
	Tremulant

Pedal C–f^{1}
36.	Prinzipal	16′
37.	Subbass	16′
38.	Octave	8′
39.	Gedackt	8′
40.	Superoctave	4′
41.	Rohrflöte	4′
42.	Nachthorn	2′
43.	Mixtur VI–VIII
44.	Posaune	16′
45.	Dulcian	16′
46.	Posaune	8′
47.	Trompete	4′

- Couplers: I/II, III/II, II/P, III/P
- Playing aids: Stop-motion device for the main body with the couplers

== Bells ==
There is a set of five bells in the tower (gis° (Hosianna) –h° (Gloria) –dis' (Amen) –fis' (Kyrieleis) –gis' (Halleluja)), which were recast in 1959 by the Rincker bell and art foundry.

== Literature ==
- Dehio, G., Weiß, G., Handbuch der deutschen Kunstdenkmäler. Bremen, Niedersachsen (2nd revised and expanded edition) (Munich, 1992)
- Kaster, K. (ed.), Die Marienkirche in Osnabrück. Ergebnisse archäologischer, bau- und kunsthistorischer Untersuchungen (Bramsche, 2001)
- Poppe, R., Die Marien-Kirche (Osnabruck, 1969)
- Schlüter, H., Festschrift zur Wiedereinweihung der St. Marienkirche zu Osnabrück (Osnabruck, 1990)
- Warnecke, E. F., Alte Kirchen und Klöster im Land zwischen Weser und Ems (Osnabruck, 1990)

== Links ==
- Parish webpage (in German)
- Images of St. Marien on bildindex.de
- Article on the church at osnabrueck.de (in German)
- H. Karge: Building research and restoration at the Marienkirche in Osnabrück (in German)
