= Cymin Samawatie =

German musician of ethno-jazz and experimental music

- Born: 1976 (age 49–50); Braunschweig, Germany
- Genres: Avant-garde jazz, Ethno jazz
- Occupations: Musician, curator, bandleader
- Instruments: Vocals, piano, percussion
- Years active: 2002–present
- Label: ECM Records
- Member of: Cyminology, Trickster Orchestra
- Awards: German World Music Award, German Jazz Award, Prize for Cultural Promotion
- Website: www.cyminsamawatie.de

Cymin Samawatie (born 1976) is a German musician. She is known as singer, composer, conductor and founder of several ensembles for ethno-jazz and experimental music in Germany. She has written compositions for a variety of ensembles – from chamber music to big bands – including commissions for the Morgenland Festival Osnabrück and the Berlin Philharmonic. Her work has been honoured with awards including the German World Music Award, the German Jazz Award and the German Prize for Cultural Promotion.

== Life and career ==
Samawatie was born and raised as the daughter of Iranian immigrants in Braunschweig, Germany. She obtained her degree in classical music at the Hochschule für Musik und Theater Hannover (percussion, piano and vocals) and another degree in jazz singing, piano and composition at the Universität der Künste Berlin.

Living in Berlin, Samawatie has been active in modern and experimental jazz as well as in contemporary classical music, with her musical and wider artistic work spanning various genres. She has written compositions for a variety of ensembles – from chamber music groups to big bands – including commissions for the Morgenland Festival Osnabrück and the Berlin Philharmonic. As a vocal artist, she sings in Farsi and has used lyrics by 13th- and 14th-century Persian poets.

In 2002, she founded the jazz quartet Cyminology with pianist Benedikt Jahnel, bassist Ralf Schwarz and drummer Ketan Bhatti combining contemporary jazz with Persian poetry. In 2003, she performed alongside the vocalist Bobby McFerrin at a concert in her home town Braunschweig. In 2013, Samawatie, Bhatti and Philip Geisler founded the Diwan der Kontinente orchestra, later renamed Trickster Orchestra. This ensemble comprises instrumentalists from the Berlin Philharmonic and musicians from Syria, Japan, China, Israel, Lebanon, Siberia and Turkey. The ensemble aims to translate the concept of the big band into contemporary and hybrid, post-migrant forms characterised by cultural diversity and the breaking down of identities.

In 2014, Samawatie started the Ensemble Sunique with Taiko Saitō, Martin Stegner and Ralf Schwarz, and in 2016 she played in a duo with Korhan Erel. She also appeared on albums by composer and jazz musician David Rothenberg (Nightingale Cities) and Christine Aufderhaar. In 2017, she co-curated the Berlin festival "Female Voice of Iran" as its artistic director. Invited by the German Embassy and the local branch of the Goethe-Institut, Cyminology performed at the Pakistan National Council of the Arts (PNCA) in Islamabad in November 2019. In February 2026, the Trickster Orchestra participated in the festival Vom Anfangen (From the Beginning) festival at the Konzerthaus Berlin.

== Awards and recognition ==
In 2018, Samawatie was awarded the German World Music Award. The jury praised her as "one of the most creative musicians in the German ethno-jazz scene: the singer has made an outstanding contribution to musical life in Germany, not only with her band Cyminology, but also as a composer and festival curator."

In 2022, the Trickster Orchestra, initiated and directed by Samawatie together with Ketan Bhatti, received the German Jazz Award as "Large Ensemble of the Year". The same year, she was awarded the Berlin Jazz Award by the Berlin Senate and Rundfunk Berlin-Brandenburg (rbb). The jury explained its decision: "As a pianist, singer, composer and ensemble leader, she brings together a wide variety of cultures and languages to create mutually inspiring art forms." In 2023, the performing rights organisation GEMA awarded her and Ketan Bhatti the German Music Authors' Prize in the category Composition – Intercultural Encounter.

In 2025 Samawati and the Trickster Orchestra were awarded the German Prize for Cultural Promotion (Deutscher Kulturförderpreis) for their project Amphiphilie. The title of the project refers to "the dissolution of stylistic boundaries in music." For this, the Trickster Orchestra, under the direction of Samawati and Bhatti and in collaboration with BASF as corporate social sponsor, assembled five musical groups into a single orchestra. The participating ensembles were the Deutsche Staatsphilharmonie, the Ensemble Colourage, the KlangForum Heidelberg, the Kurpfälzisches Kammerorchester and the orchestra of the Nationaltheater Mannheim. Musicians from different cultural and musical backgrounds worked together to create a new musical style, reflecting the diversity of German society and its ethnic communities. This culminated on 23 February 2024 in the world premiere of the project Amphiphilie, composed by Samawatie and Bhatti.

Also in 2025, Samawati and Bhatti were awarded the Friedlieb-Ferdinand-Runge Prize by the Preußische Seehandlung foundation for their innovative approach to artistic creation. The jury commented: "Even more so than other multi-ethnic musical ensembles, the Trickster Orchestra is distinguished by its aim to highlight the musical richness that has emerged in Germany through immigration."

== Discography ==
- Cymin Samawatie. Temas with Angelika Niescier (ts), Neva Özgen (kemençe), Arslan Hazreti (kamança), Erdem Şimşek (bağlama), Duygu Demir (cello), Cem Önertürk (fl), Başak Yavuz (voc), Serkan Şener (kaval), Şevket Akıncı (g) (Iki Müziq, 2025)

=== with Cyminology ===
- Saburi (ECM Records 2010)
- As Ney (ECM Records 2011)
- Phoenix (ECM Records 2015)

=== with Trickster Orchestra ===
- Cymin Samawatie/Ketan Bhatti. Trickster Orchestra (ECM Records 2021)

== Reception ==
Samawati's music has mainly been covered in the German-language press (Der Spiegel, Die Tageszeitung, Qantara.de, Neue Musikzeitung, Jazzzeitung, Jazz Echo), but also internationally (Festival Internacional de Jazz de Loulé, (Portugal), Citizenjazz (France), Dawn (Pakistan), All About Jazz (USA), Irish Times (Ireland)).

In a profile of Samawatie and the Trickster Orchestra, Die Tageszeitung wrote that while her music "does indeed present non-European sounds, instruments and musicians, these are neither put on display nor subsumed under the local cultural canon." Further, her perspective on the ensemble's music was quoted as follows: "Jazz tradition has always been political; it takes existing traditions and shapes them into its own aesthetic; it has always been connected with migration and the cultural practices of minorities." All about Jazz called Cyminology's record As Ney "an album that speaks across borders with quiet but nevertheless passionate beauty."
