= Shabnam Parvaresh =

Iranian musician, curator and painter (born 1983

Shabnam Parvaresh شبنم پرورش
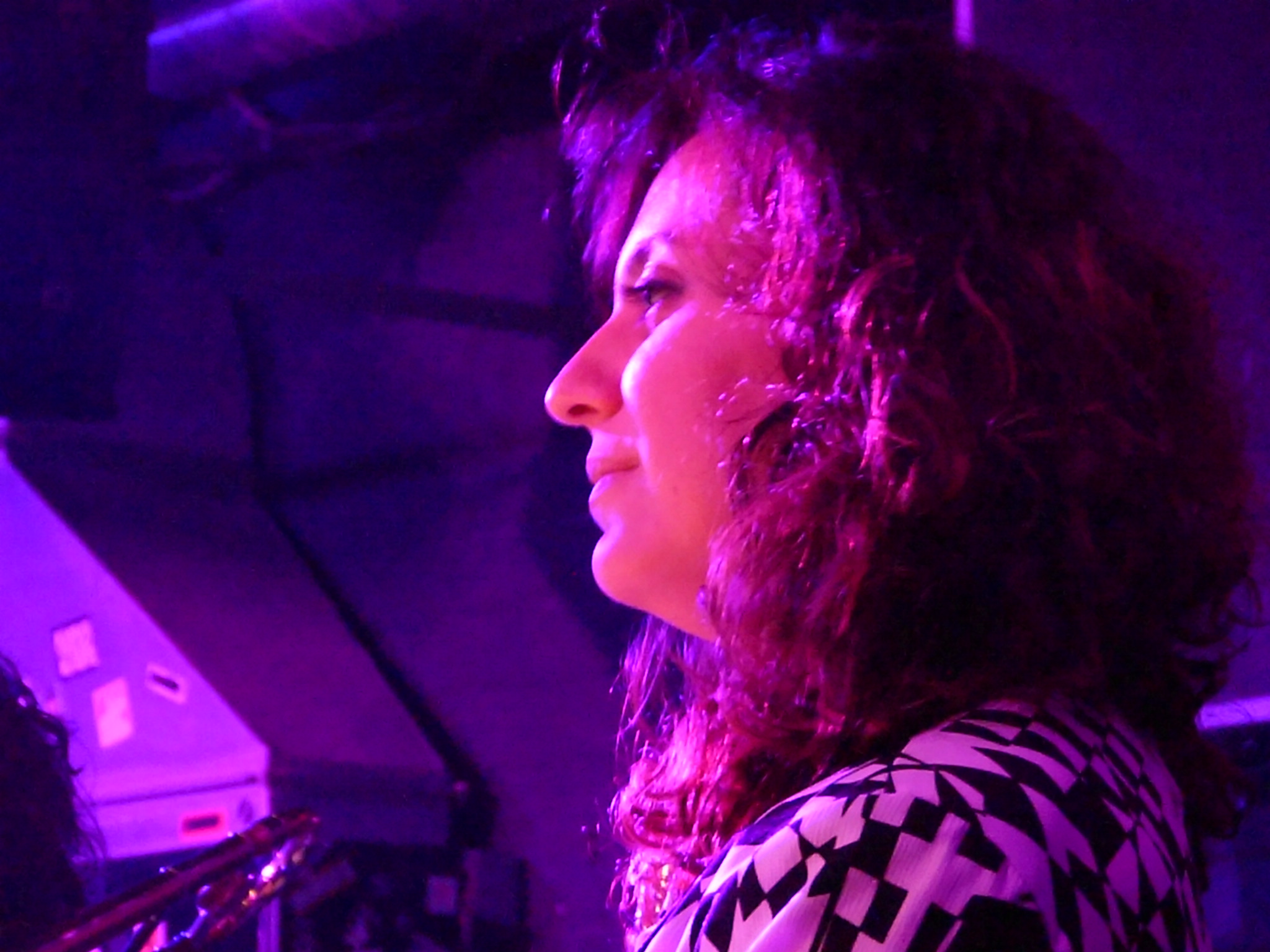
- Parvaresh in Cologne, Germany, 2025

Background information
- Born: 1983 (age 42–43); Tehran, Iran
- Genres: Jazz, Musical improvisation
- Occupations: Musician, composer, curator and painter
- Instruments: clarinet, bass clarinet
- Years active: 2020–present
- Member of: Sheen Trio
- Formerly of: Tehran Symphony Orchestra
- Award: Scholarship for Innovative Music Compositions 2024, Zonta Music Award 2020, Study Up Award for Jazz 2018
- Website: www.shabnamparvaresh.com
- Known for: Artistic director of Morgenland Festival Osnabrück 2026

Shabnam Parvaresh (Persian: شبنم پرورش; born 1983) is an Iranian musician (clarinet, bass clarinet, composition), curator and painter living in Germany. After early years of performing with the Symphony Orchestra and Iran's National Traditional Orchestra, she moved to Osnabrück, Germany, in 2013.

After graduating in jazz at the Osnabrück University of Applied Sciences, she became known through her compositions and performances of avantgarde jazz and improvised music, including at the Moers Festival and the Tehran Contemporary Music Festival. Starting in 2026 she has been nominated as artistic director of the Morgenland Festival Osnabrück for world music.

== Life and career ==
=== Early years and education ===
Parvaresh, who grew up in Tehran, Iran, first started to study flute at a local music school in her home town. Later, she received private clarinet lessons from members of the Tehran Symphony Orchestra. She began her musical career as a bass clarinettist with the Tehran Symphony Orchestra and Iran's National Traditional Orchestra. Further, she obtained a Bachelor’s degree in Fine Art and Painting from the University of Science and Culture, Tehran, and started to pursue a career as an artist and musician in Tehran.

When the Osnabrück Symphony Orchestra gave a guest performance in Iran in 2007, Parveresh first started her personal contacts with this German orchestra. Avoiding the repressive political situation in Iran and to broaden her musical training, she decided to leave. In 2014, she began to study jazz at the Institute of Music at Osnabrück University of Applied Sciences.

=== Career as musician and curator ===
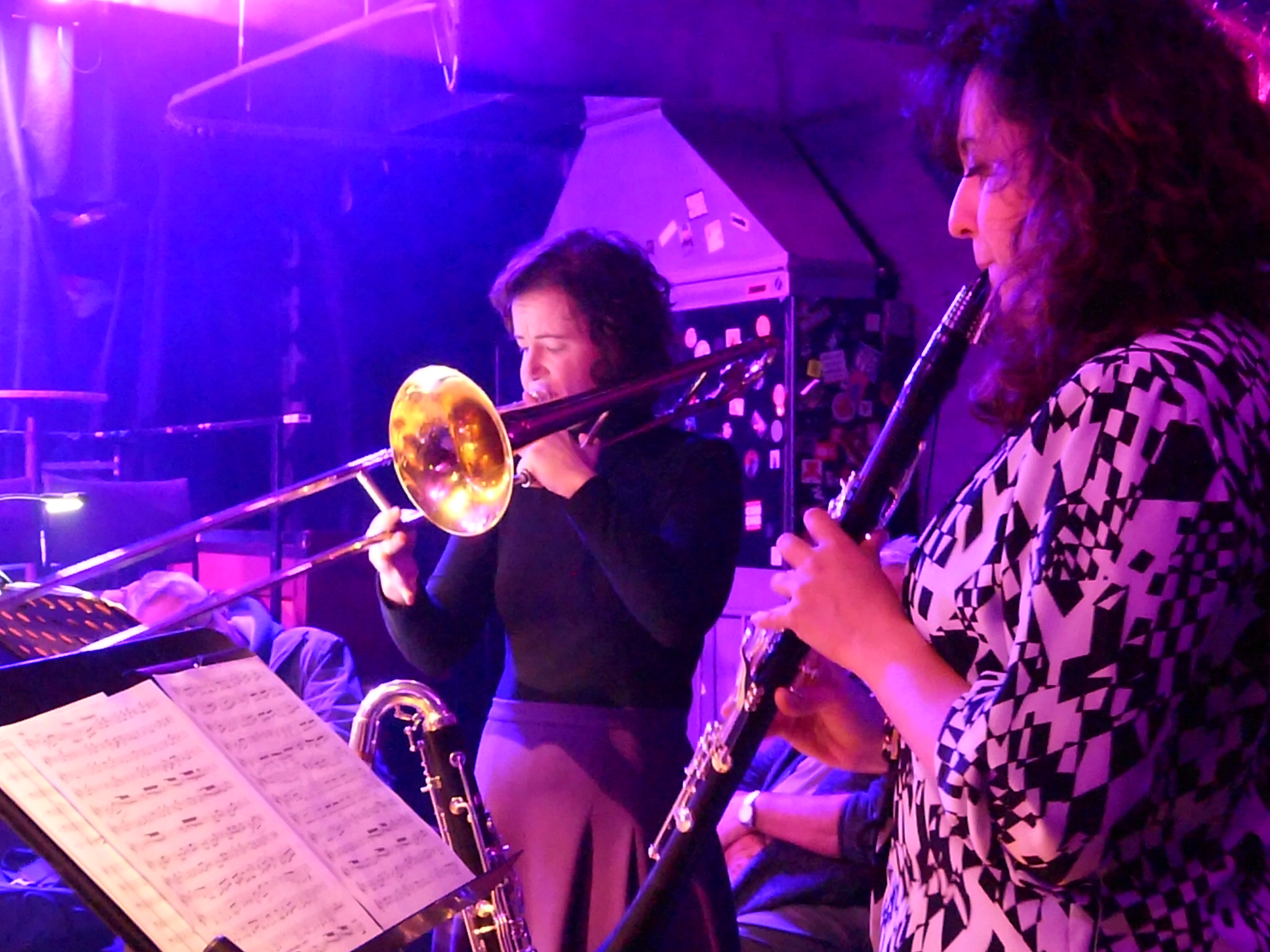
Shabnam Parvaresh and trombonist Shannon Barnett 2025 at ARTheater, Cologne

In 2019, Parvaresh founded and performed at festivals across Europe with her band called Sheen Trio. Their debut album Gozar (Passage) was released in 2023, and she has been active as instrumentalist in numerous other projects. Further, she has performed at festivals such as the Winterjazz Festival Cologne, the Moers Festival, the Tehran Contemporary Music Festival and the Multiphonics Festival. Alongside Syrian musician Kinan Azmeh she appeared at Morgenland Festival in Osnabrück.

As a composer, Parvaresh has been inspired by Persian poetry and the life of the poet and filmmaker Forugh Farrokhzad. She draws on a variety of genres, including musical improvisation and electronic sounds as a form of spontaneous communication with her musical partners.

In March 2026, Parvaresh co-founded and curated the festival Jazz49 in Osnabrück. Previously, she had curated the concert series "Klangfenster at hase29" for improvised music. Starting in May 2026, the Morgenland Festival announced that she will take over from founder Michael Dreyer as artistic director.

=== Career as visual artist ===
As a visual artist, Parvaresh has had solo exhibitions of her work in Tehran, Osnabrück and the United Arab Emirates. In 2022, she was nominated for the Osnabrück Art Prize.

== Awards and distinctions ==
- Scholarship for Innovative Music Compositions by NRW Ministry of Culture, 2024
- Zonta Music Award, 2020
- Study Up Award for Jazz with Lukas Schwegmann Quintet, 2018

== Discography ==
- Sheen Trio: Transitory (UnitOpen records 2026, with Ula Martyn-Ellis, Philipp Buck)
- Sheen Trio: Gozar (Berthold Records 2023)
- Shabnam Parvaresh / Katharina Maschmeyer / Joachim Raffel: (Alina Records 2024)
- Parvaresh / Raffel: Rising Red (Timezone Records 2023)

== Reception ==
Parvaresh's music has been described by the Dutch organization European Clarinet Congress as a combination of Persian music, electronic elements, improvisation and jazz, creating "a new musical aesthetic on the clarinet."

In their blog "One to Watch" Saatchi Art gallery described the influence of music on her abstract paintings as "an attempt to visualize sound with paint, [...] applied to the canvas in a rhythmic manner." Referring to Parvaresh's solidarity with reform movements in Iran, the Neue Osnabrücker Zeitung wrote: "Parvaresh loves the deep, sonorous sounds of her bass clarinet, resonating with the pain of oppression that Iran is experiencing on a daily basis."
