= Cyminology =

German jazz band

- Origin: Berlin, Germany
- Genre: Ethno-jazz
- Years active: 2002–present
- Labels: Doublemoon, ECM
- Members: Cymin Samawatie, Benedikt Jahnel, Ralf Schwarz, Ketan Bhatti
- Website: Cyminology

Cyminology is a jazz band based in Berlin with culturally and ethnically diverse influences. They primarily perform with Persian lyrics sung by Cymin Samawatie, who has Iranian and German heritage. The lyrics are frequently influenced by classical Persian poetry. The music of the quartet is a synthesis of contemporary jazz, European classical music and other elements. The band went on tour in the Middle East in 2007 and the Caucasus region in 2008 as representatives of the Goethe-Institut and won the title of Best Band on the National Level of the Creole Global Music Contest in 2012.

== Band members ==
Cymin Samawatie
Singer, composer, a daughter of Iranian immigrants to Germany was born in 1976. She studied at the Hochschule für Musik, Theater und Medien Hannover, Germany and at the Berlin University of the Arts. One highlight in her musical career has been being on stage with Bobby McFerrin in 2003. In 2010 she began composing for musicians of the Berlin Philharmonic.
Benedikt Jahnel
Piano, Composer, was born in 1980 in France and raised in southern Germany. He studied Jazz at the Berlin University of the Arts and City College of New York. Apart from working with Cyminology for many years, he has also performed with many other Jazz ensembles live, as well as on recordings.

Ralf Schwarz
Double bass, was born in 1971 in northern Germany and has collaborated with Cymin on various projects since 1993. He studied at the University of the Arts Bremen.

Ketan Bhatti
Percussion, was born in 1981 in New Delhi. He studied Jazz-Drums at the Berlin University of the Arts. He also composes music pieces for theater performances with his brother Vivan.

== Discography ==
- Get strong (2002) (self-released)
- Per Se (2005) (Doublemoon)
- Bemun (2007) (Doublemoon)
- As Ney (2009) (ECM)
- Saburi (2011) (ECM)
- Phoenix (2015) (ECM)
