= Michael Dreyer =

German artist, author, and director

- Born: 1953 (age 71–72); Coburg, West Germany
- Occupation(s): Author, artistic director, artist

Michael Dreyer (born 1953) is a German artist, author, and director, who analyzes the basis of art. He creates, analyses and proves the connection between the presentation, history, attraction and forms of Art. Since 1982, Dreyer had worked as a professor at Merz Akademie in Stuttgart, Germany, where he had been teaching visual communication.

== Career ==
In his art pieces, Dreyer works with sculptures, environments, movies, theater pieces, musical issues, graphics and texts, with which he dissects the modules of their connection to each other.

In 2006, Dreyer founded the exhibition space W.O. Scheibe Museum in Stuttgart, where he organised the "Palindrom". He also exhibited "Oben und Unten mit Rex Whistler & Friends" with Tom Holert in 2009, as well as "white albums" with Diedrich Diederichsen, Helmut Draxler, Julian Göthe, Wolfgang Paukner and Hans-Jürgen Hafner in 2010.

== Works ==
=== Single exhibitions, performances and movies ===
The following is a list of Dreyer's single works:

- 1986: Der geliehene Ernstfall, (zs. mit Diedrich Diederichsen und Lucius Burckhardt) im Rahmen der Ausstellung "Erkundungen", Messe Stuttgart
- 1996: Shorty, Film, Performance (Berlin, Marburg, Stuttgart, Hamburg) (zs. mit Sharon Lockhart, Kamera, Schorsch Kamerun u.v.a.)
- 2004: Abschaffung von Prügelsprache, Ausstellung, Performance, Filme, Publikation (Künstlerhaus Stuttgart), Grazer Kunstverein; Galerie Meerrettich, Berlin
- 2006: Pianistin, eine Aufnahme 'elektronischer Klänge' von Stockhausen anhörend, Ausstellung, Performance, Künstlerhaus Stuttgart
- 2010: White Albums, Ausstellung, Publikation, zs. mit Julian Göthe, Hans Jürgen Hafner, Michael Paukner, W.O. Scheibe Museum, Stuttgart
- 2011: Theorie des Armen Publikums / Towards A Poor Audience, Hermes und der Pfau, Stuttgart; Triple Negation – Double Props, I WE NOW INTERRUPT FOR A COMMERCIAL, Gastkurator Clemens Krümmel, Aanant & Zoo, Berlin
- 2012: Machen die immer (noch) das Gleiche?, NGBK, Berlin

=== Group exhibitions ===
The following is a list of Dreyer's works with a group:

- 1998: Albert vs. History, Kunsthalle Basel, kuratiert von Albert Oehlen
- 1999: Pay with Me, Bethanien, Berlin, kuratiert von Andreas Fanizadeh und Eva Meier; Koether, Bohlen, Richter" Galerie Esther Freund, Wien, kuratiert von Albert Oehlen
- 2006: Shandyismus. Autorenschaft als Genre, Secession Wien; Kunsthaus Dresden, kuratiert von Helmut Draxler
- 2007: Re-Dis-Play, Kunstverein Heidelberg, kuratiert von Catharina Gebbers; Kommando Giotto Bandoni, Galerie Gio Marconi, Mailand, kuratiert von André Butzer
- 2009: Palindrom, mit Tom Holert, Hermes und der Pfau/W.O. Scheibe Museum, Stuttgart
- 2011: INDEX 11, Kunsthaus Hamburg; Bild und Träger – und ein Pfeiler aus Sanssouci, BKV Potsdam, curated by Hans Jürgen Hafner
- 2012: From the Age of the Poets, Aanant & Zoo, Berlin

=== Literature ===
- Michael Dreyer – Theorie und Plastik, published by Helmut Draxler, 2016.
- Dreyer, Michael – Holert, Tom (Hrsg.): PALINDROM. Oben und Unten mit Rex Whistler & Friends, Stuttgart 2009.
- Hafner, Hans-Jürgen: Michael Dreyer, Berlin 2012.
