= St. Peter's Cathedral, Osnabrück =

St. Peter's Cathedral
- Dom St. Peter
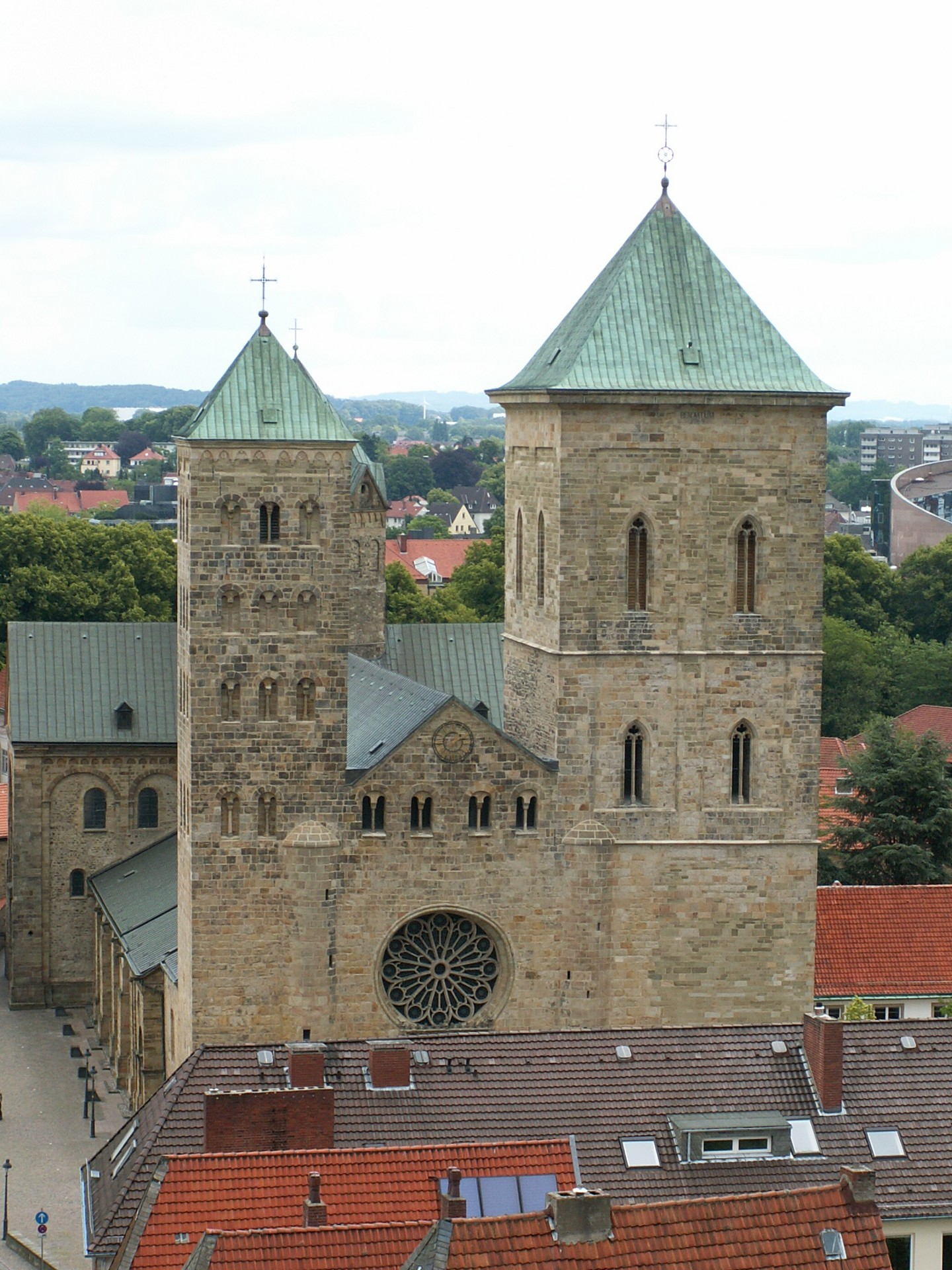
- Osnabrück Cathedral. To the right is the southwest tower with the ringing bells.

- Location within Lower Saxony Location within Germany
- 52°16′39″N 8°02′42″E
- Location: Osnabrück, Lower Saxony
- Country: Germany
- Denomination: Roman Catholic
- Website: www.dom-osnabrueck.de

History
- Status: Cathedral
- Founded: 785

Architecture
- Functional status: Active
- Style: Romanesque, Gothic
- Completed: 11th century (enlarged); 13th century (renovations); 1946 (reconstruction of tower)

Administration
- Diocese: Osnabrück

Clergy
- Bishop: sede vacante
- Dean: Johannes Wübbe Ulrich Beckwermert Ansgar Lüttel Reinhard Molitor Theodor Paul Martin Schomaker Hermann Wieh Bernhard Stecker Alfons Strodt

St. Peter's Cathedral in Osnabrück, Germany is the cathedral of the Roman Catholic Diocese of Osnabrück. The cathedral is a late Romanesque building and dominates the city's skyline.

== History, interior architecture, and equipment ==
The first version of St. Peter's Cathedral was built in the year 785, 15 years after the diocese was founded by Charlemagne. The Normans destroyed the church 100 years later, and the present version of the church developed only gradually after a fire around 1100.

The oldest parts of the present-day church are the Romanesque crossing tower, the northern facade and the Romanesque-Gothic west facade. The dome in the middle part of the three-aisled nave is as high as the pillars on which it rests.

The oldest pieces of equipment that have survived to this day are the baptismal font from 1220 and the triumphal cross from 1230. The broken rood screen from 1664 has also survived. Twelve statues received from the Münster sculptor Heinrich Brabender remain preserved to this day, including figures of the Christ and of the Apostles, and also a smaller number of statues received from Duke Erich II of Saxe-Lauenburg, Bishop of Münster. These are on display at the Diocesan Museum of Osnabrück.

Over the centuries, the cathedral changed in appearance - the interior primarily during the Baroque period, to which the altars, figures, and epitaphs bear testimony, and the exterior during the major restoration in 1882-1910 under Alexander Behnes through renovations and building of annexes. During the Second World War the cathedral roof with baroque domes and some church annexes were destroyed by incendiary bombs. The cathedral has since been rebuilt and is still a major attraction for the Christians of the city and the diocese as well as people interested in art history from around the world. The Osnabrück Wheel, which on September 13, 1944 fell from the larger of the towers due to bombing, has been re-erected at the side of the cathedral.

The cloister is attached to the church at south of the nave. It has open pillar-arcades on the remaining three sides. Cushion capitals, which correspond to those in the former west choir of 1140, are present in the east wing. The barrel vault in the eastern part of the cloister features lunettes but no belt bows; the vaults in the south and west wings are supported by belt bows and ogival arches (built in the second quarter of the 13th century). During the Second World War the cloister, which had been walled towards the courtyard, served as an air raid shelter.

== Bells ==
The belfry in the southwest tower houses a ring of six cast steel bells all cast in 1954, one of the Bochumer Verein's best works. The bells were built in the so-called experimental V7 shape, a minor octave shape cast. The 1951 cast steel bells of the Paderborn Cathedral also ring in the same disposition, and were considered the first major bells ringing in the then newly developed V7 shape. The largest bell or bourdon is called " Maria Immaculata" and it weighs 5 tons. The 5 smaller bells are named “Petrus”, “Crispinus and Crispinianus”, “Wiho”, “Gosbert” and “Adolf von Tecklenburg”. In Germany, the bells are always numbered from largest to smallest, Bell 1 is always the tenor or bourdon.

Bells of St. Peter's Cathedral
Bell	Mass (kg)
Maria Immaculata (Bourdon Bell)	4830
Petrus	2805
Crispinus & Crispinianus	2115
Wiho	1560
Gosbert	935
Adolf von Tecklenburg	625

== Organs ==
The cathedral has two organs: the main organ in the west, and a small choir organ in the north transept.

=== Main organ ===
The main organ was built in 2003 by the organ maker Kuhn AG of Männedorf, Switzerland. It stands above the main portal under the west rose window. The console is "in" the organ, centered over the back wall of the organ, facing towards the altar. It is electrically connected to a small tower organ chamber with four registers (cone chests), which is housed on the first floor of the large west tower. The organ chamber is swellable and has a sound-absorbing chamber.

=== Mutin-Cavaillé-Coll ===
The cathedral has an additional rare organ - on the north wall of the transept is a choir organ from the workshop of Mutin-Cavaillé-Coll. Built in 1898, the organ has 12 stops with three additional transmissions to the pedal. All the sounding pipes are swellable.

== Gallery ==
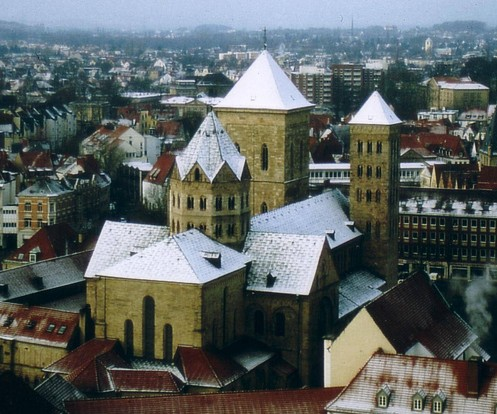
View from the east

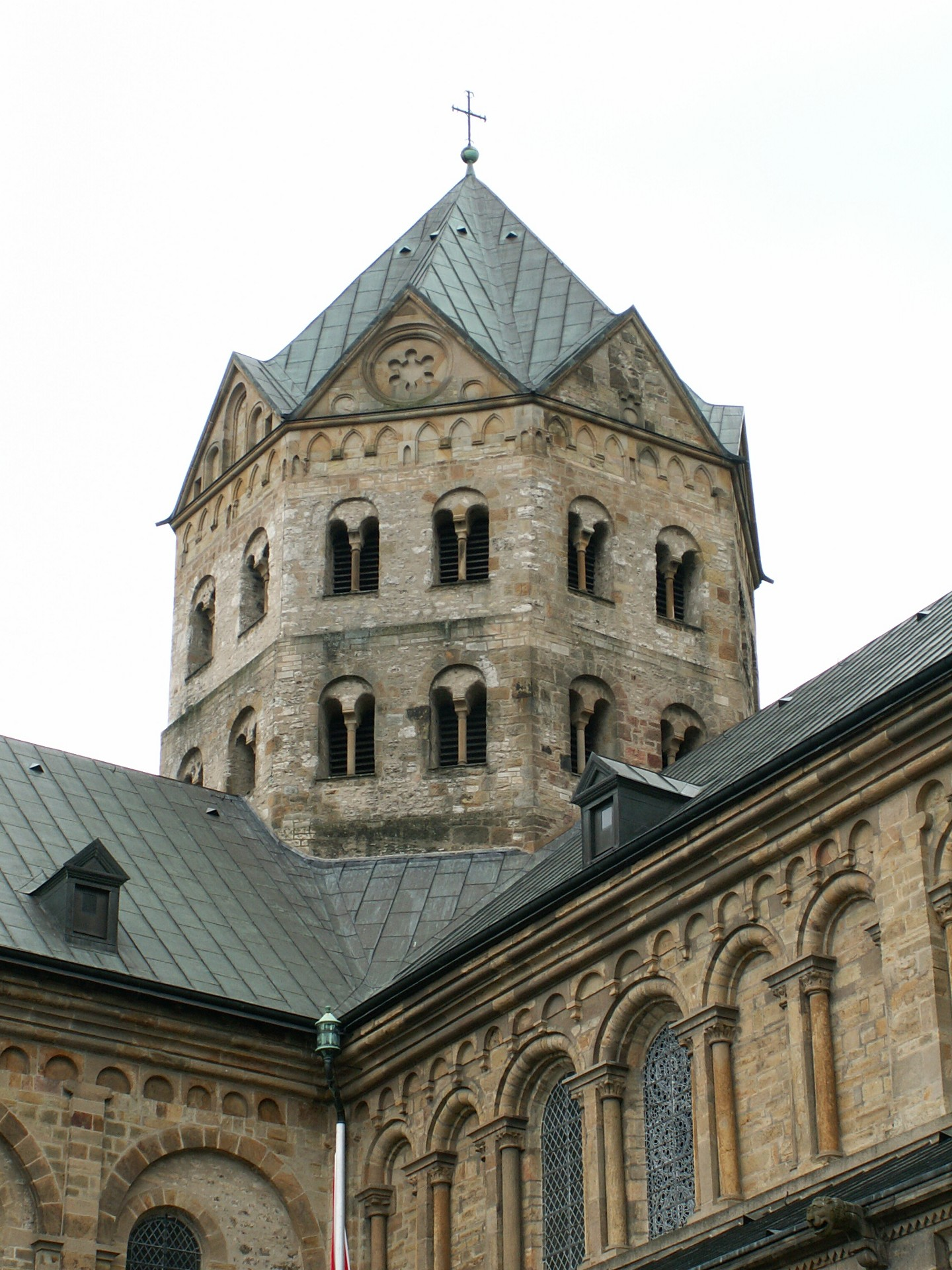
Crossing tower of the cathedral, viewed from the northwest

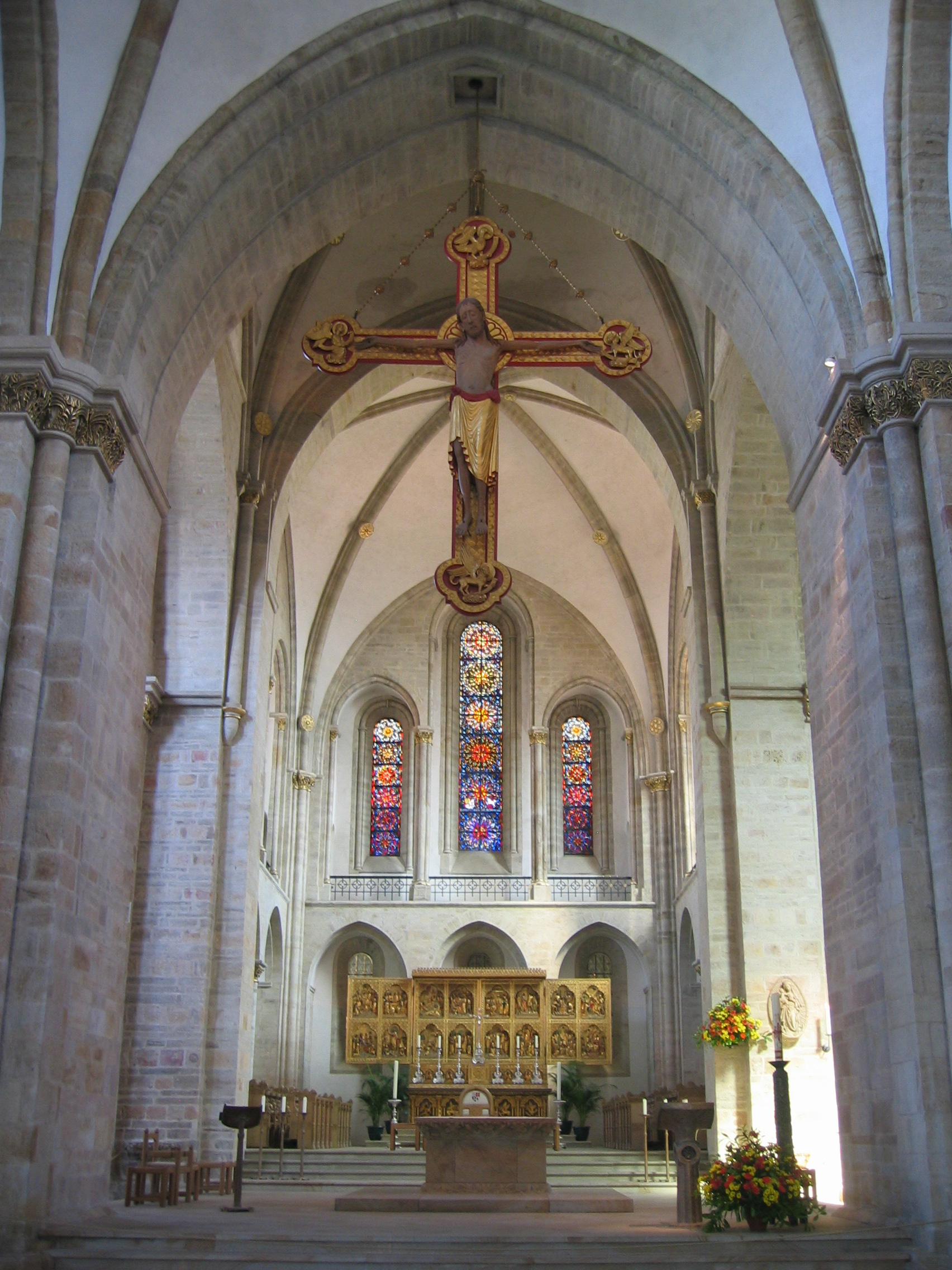
Chancel

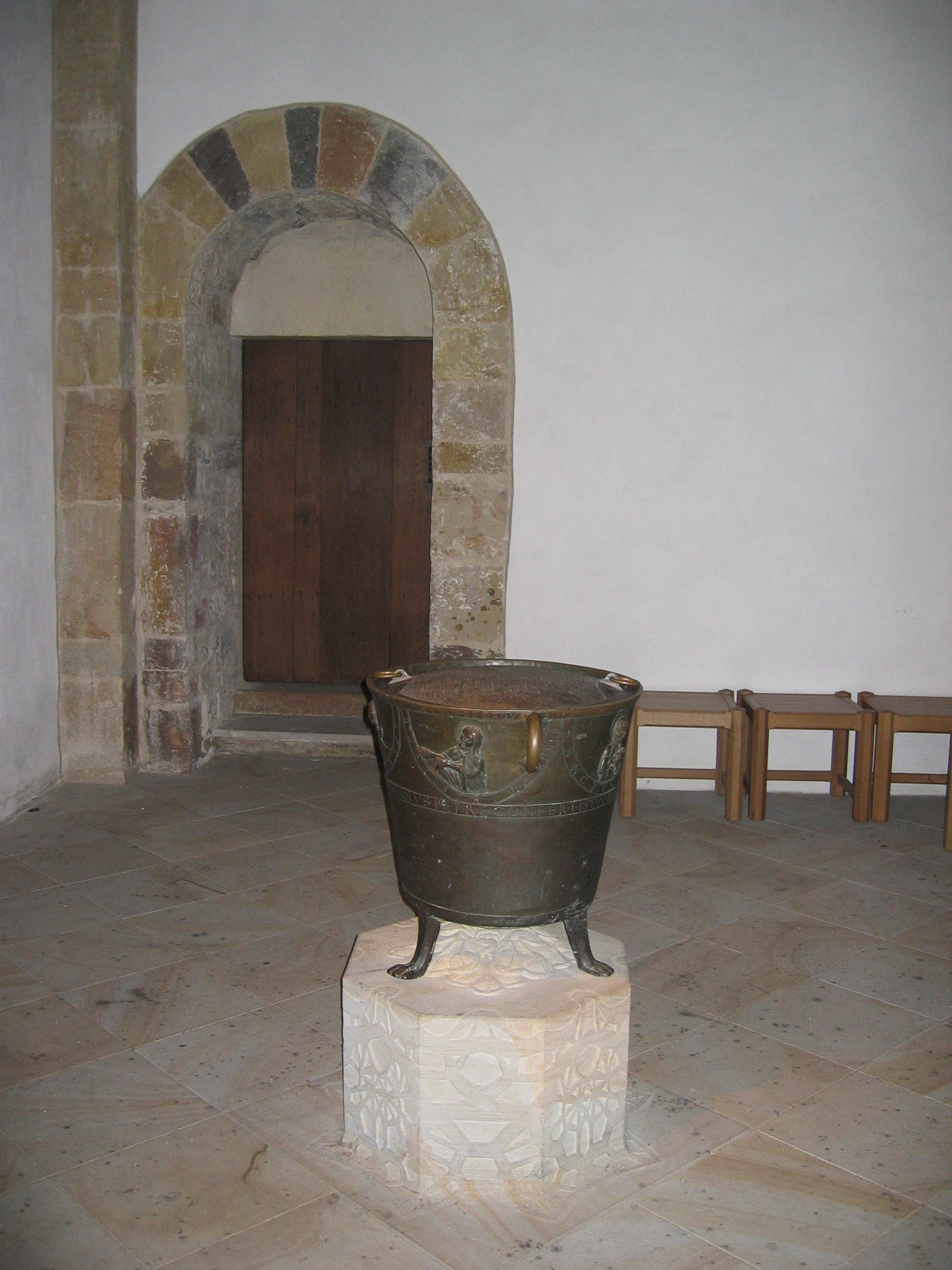
Baptismal font of 1220

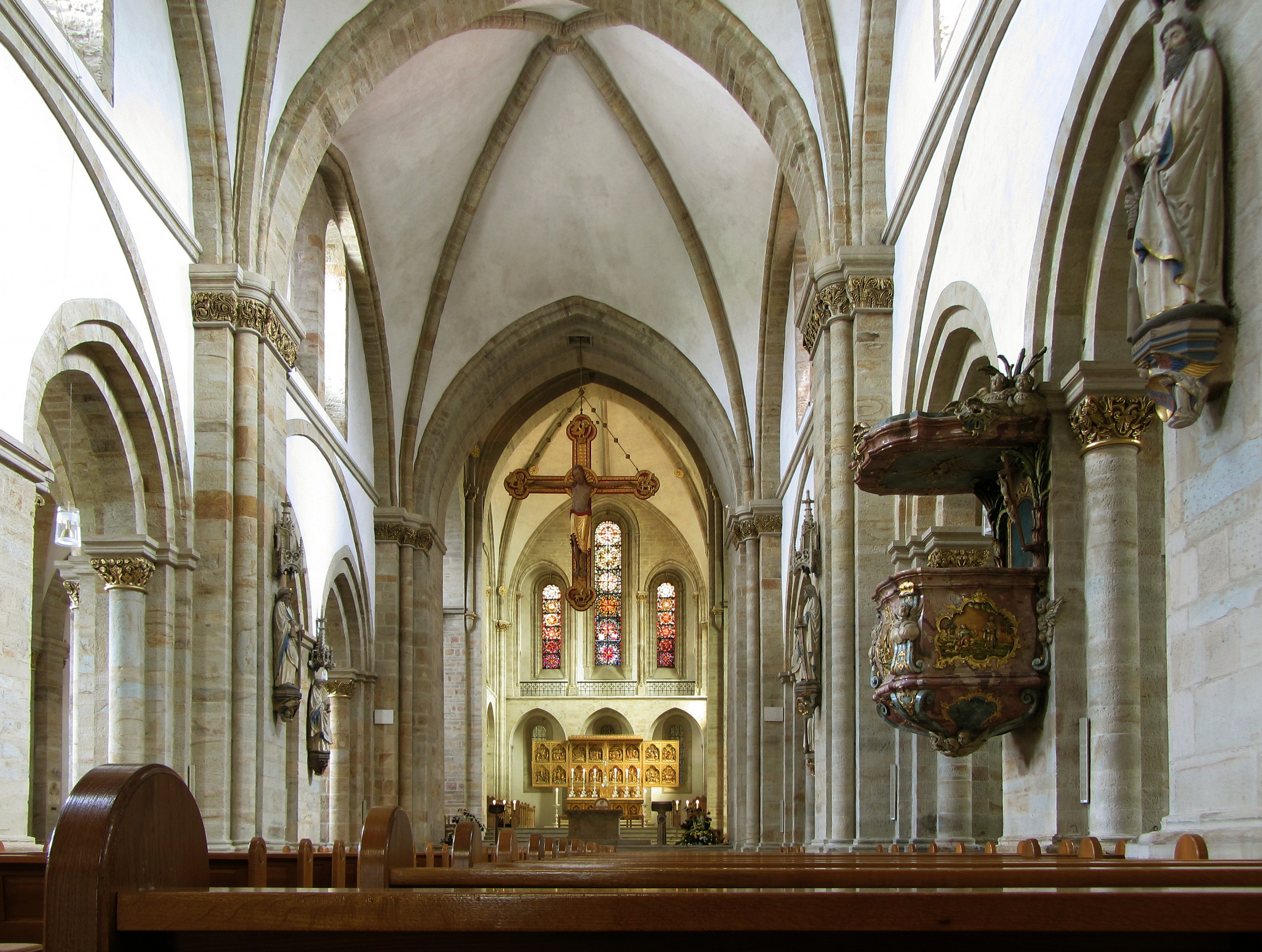
Interior with triumphal cross of 1230

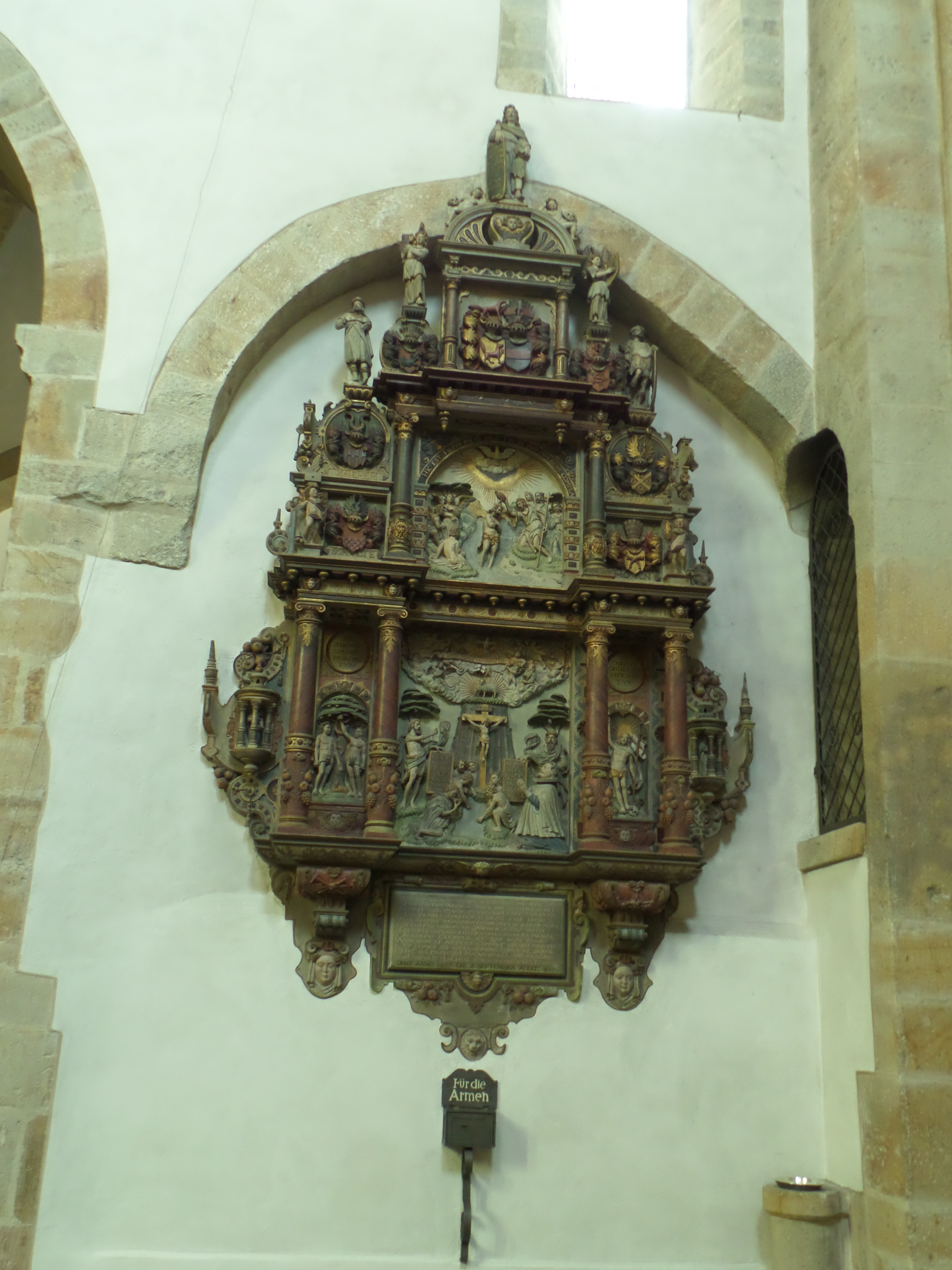
Altarpiece

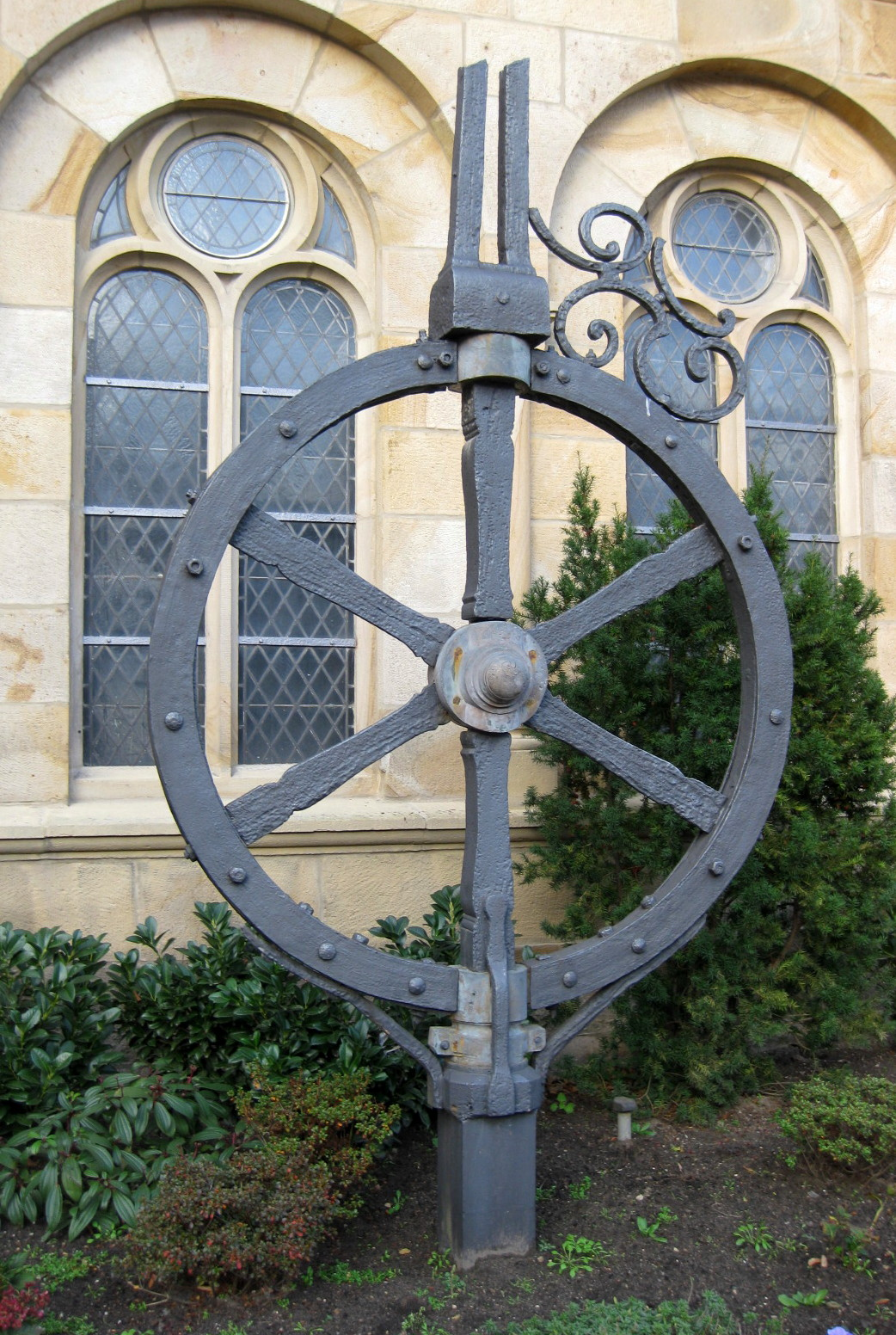
Osnabrück wheel, originally on the large southwest tower

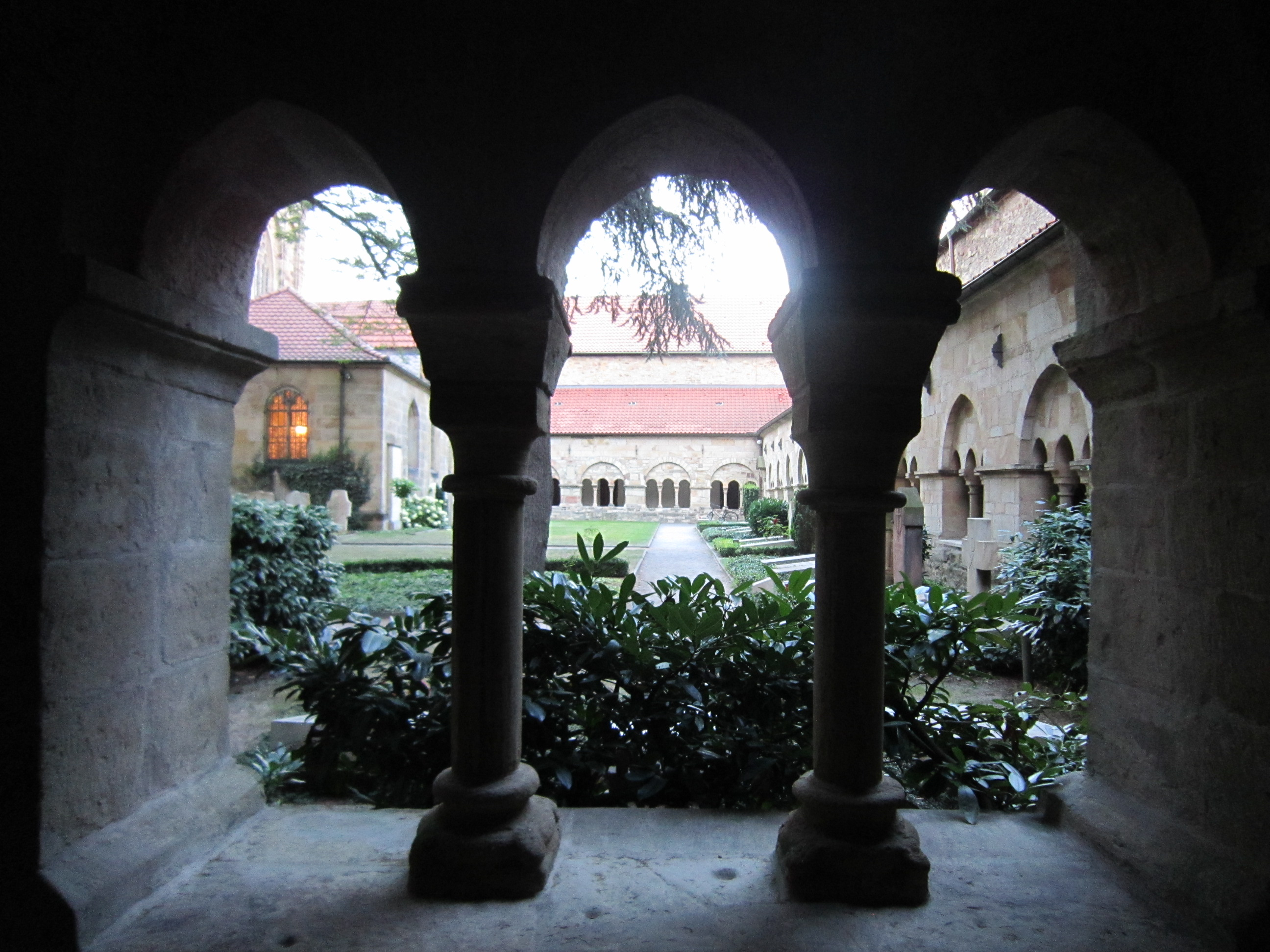
Cloister surrounding the courtyard of the cathedral

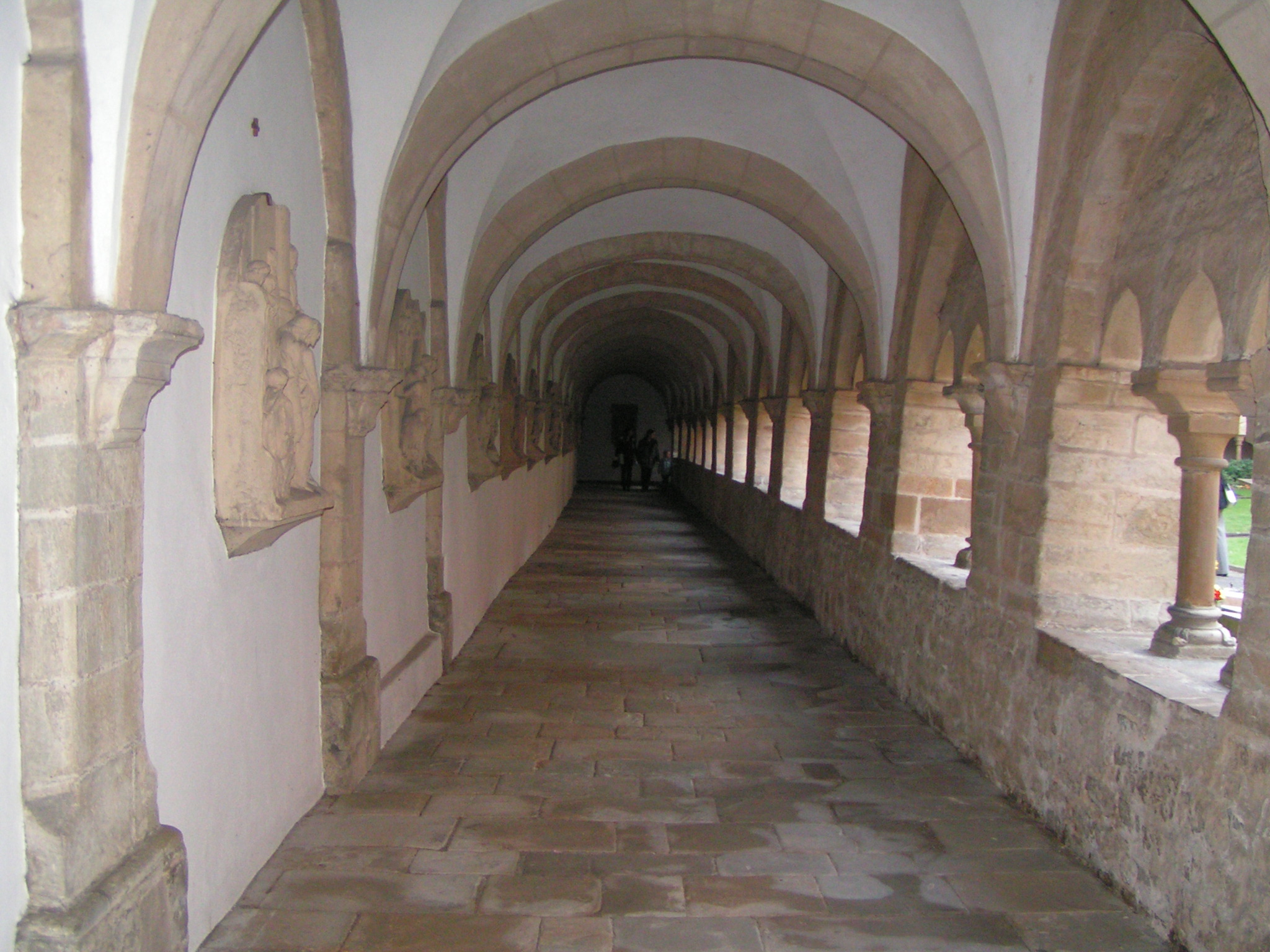
Cloister

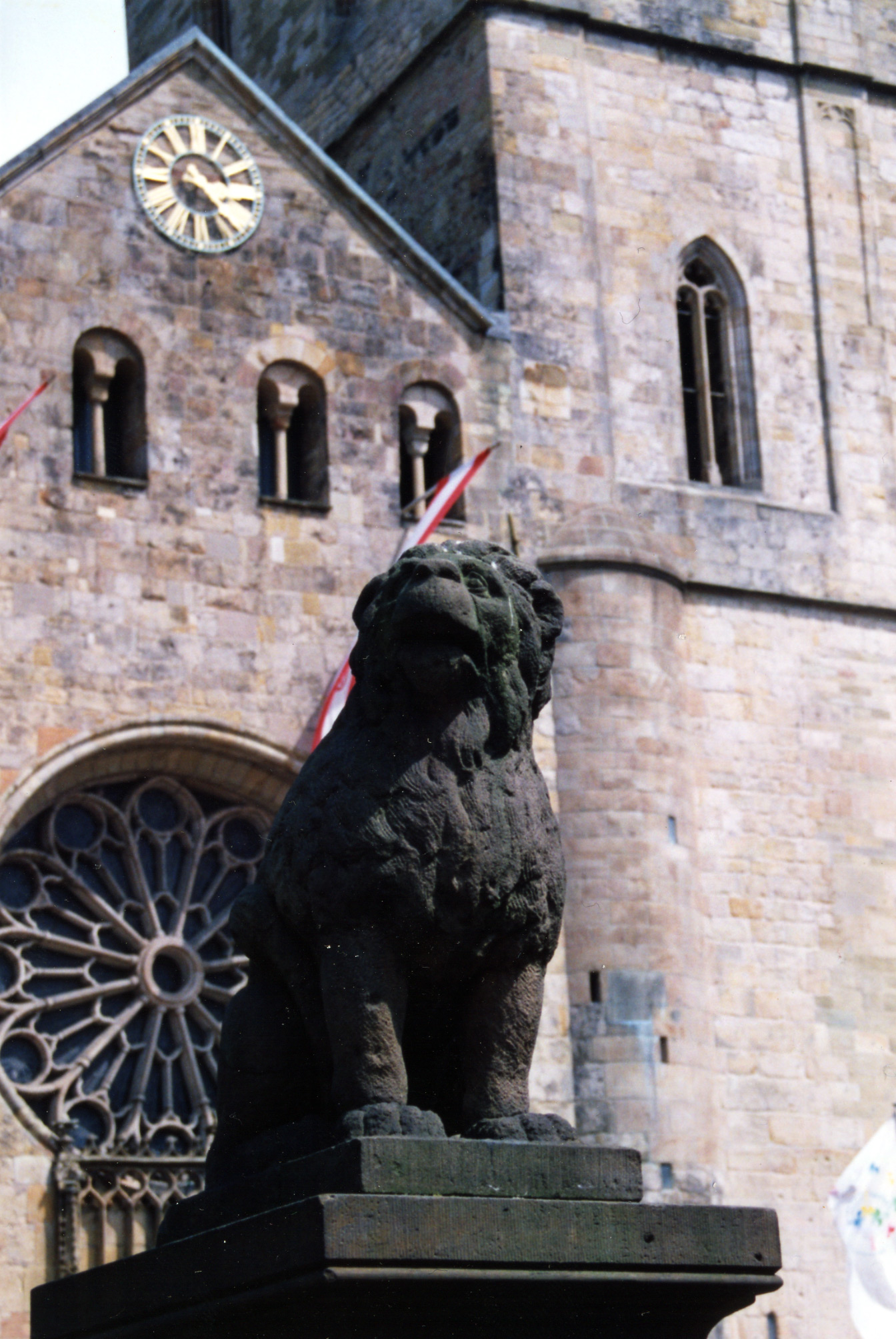
The Löwenpudel ("lion poodle") in front of the cathedral
