= Music of Syria =

The music of Syria has developed in the wake of multiple eras of conquest and influences from surrounding cultures. Lying near Egypt, Israel, and Palestine, and connected to southern Europe by the Mediterranean, Syria became host to many distinct cultural musics through trade and route. Syrian music has been influenced by Bedouin nomadic tribes, the maqam system and geopolitical developments in the Middle East. It is typically performed by a singer accompanied by three or four instruments. The texture is thin but can become denser depending on the instrumentals. Music is tightly linked to poetry in Syria.

The music of Syria is part of the classical music traditions in the greater Arab world. The main components are a maqam and an iqa (rhythm/metre). A maqam is a set of scales made of up of three or four notes. A maqam will have two or three of these scales put together which is then played over the iqa (rhythm). Both the maqam and iqa can be advanced or simple to play. Both the maqam and iqa serve as a structure which musicians ornament as they play. Music has also become a means of consolation and preservation of culture in refugee camps.

== Characteristics of Syrian music ==
Syria borders the Mediterranean sea and is located in the Levant. Music of the Middle East has a predominantly monophonic nature, which means music without multiple melodies or harmonies. However, a rich texture can be achieved if multiple instruments play the same melody with slight variations or rhythmic ornamentations. Ethnomusicologist Bruno Nettl describes this as parallel polyphony which consists of a singer improvising a melody and an instrument following behind with that same melody. Many of the tones played are played as an interpretation of the music from the player, rather than the music notation or song. This gives the player the freedom to bend or mold the notes causing an improvisational effect on the structure of the music. This results in a personal interpretation of the players feelings towards the song. This causes an effect that connects the performer with the audience which can create a feeling of ecstasy in the listener. Compared to western music, this may be similar to a solo produced by a player during a song or a rendition of a song that keeps the same form but is changed slightly creating an effect that is predictable enough to the listener while revealing new variations of the song. This style of song in Syrian music creates a feeling of excitement for how the musician will play the upcoming sections.

=== Music and poetry ===
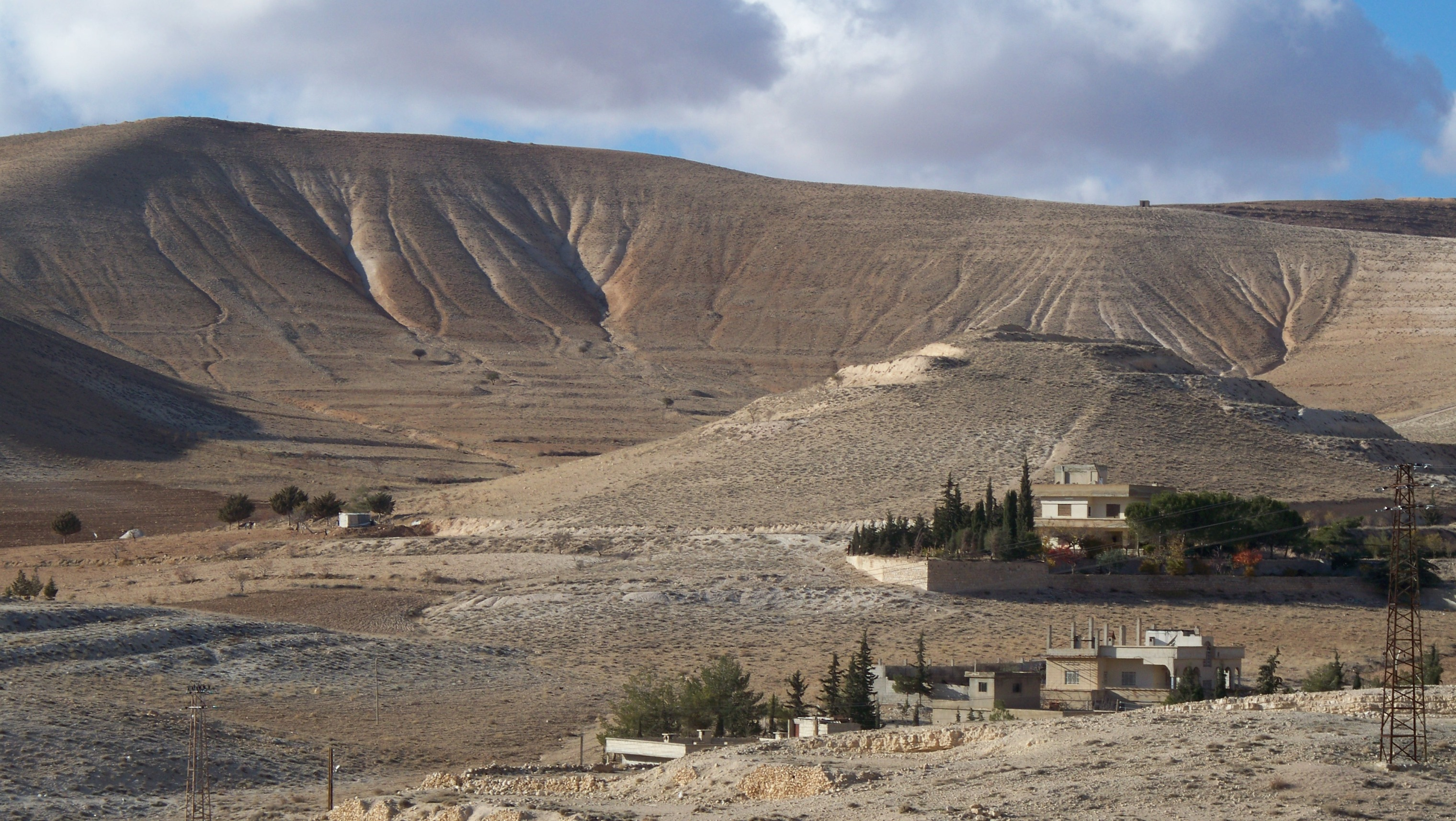
Landscape of Syrian mountain.

A significant part of Syrian music is sung in prose that participates in the distinctness of the Middle Eastern sound. There is an intersection of elements in Syrian music that give it a distinct sound as well as being a driving force in many of the music traditions found in Syria. These elements are:

- the music being played predominantly as a monophonic texture;
- the music is near-inseparable to poetry;
- although the music follows particular maqam'at (the plural of maqam which is the music mode system used in the Middle East), there is melodic improvisation that is to be expected;
- last, the music is highly ornamented with quartertone's and microtones that provide the player with the necessary tones to accurately account for every possible emotion that may be drawn from the music.

Throughout time, history, and cultural amalgamation, the Syrian musical style has been constructed as a platform to create the perfect sonic environment for the listener to fully emerge in the stories told in the poetry. The story's narrative is told in the poetry and then enhanced by the music involving such accuracy in emotional effect from the quarter and microtones that it would provide the listener with the greatest understanding of the story.

A particularly influential group in Syrian music and specifically values, ideologies, folklore, and the poetic customs of the Levant are the Bedouin tribes.

== Bedouin influence on Syrian music ==
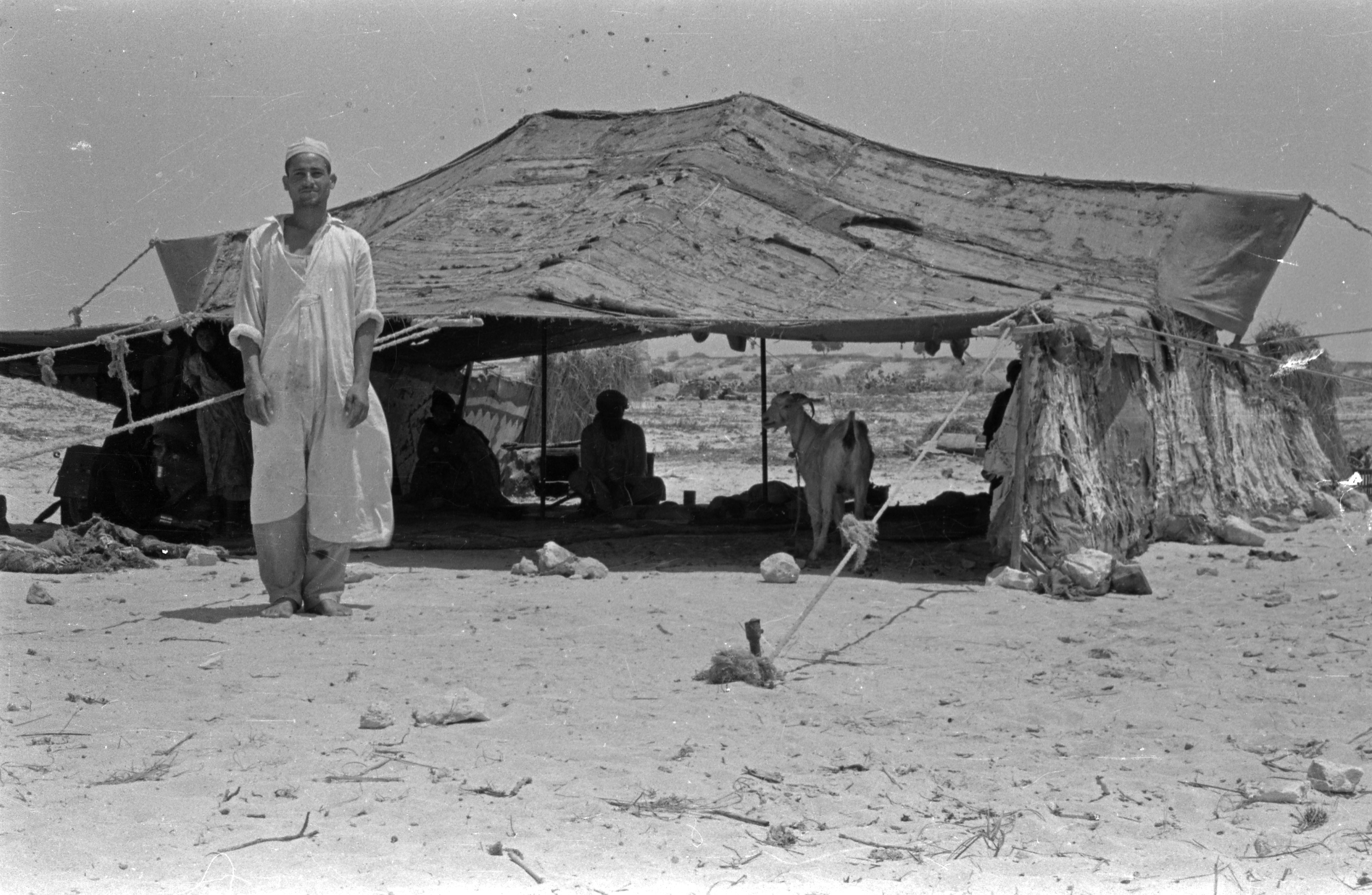
A Bedouin and his tent

Bedouin is a name given to the nomadic tribes that lived in the Levant which have played an important role in shaping the music present in the countries of the Levant. The Bedouin influence can be seen in the ideologies, customs, and musical genres. One such impact of Bedouin culture is in the music genres of rural Syria and Lebanon. Within the encounters of the Bedouin and surroundings regions, there was cultural exchange throughout the many years of these practices. The music genres reflecting the ideologies are as follows.

- Ideologies that were adopted from the Bedouin culture into the musical genres were hospitality, chivalry, bravery, and militancy. These types of ideologies were sung in a song form or genre called shruqi.
- Ideologies like love, heartache, and sentiment, were sung in a genre called ataba.
- Nadb is funeral music that honours the departed and war chants are sung when applicable.

The Bedouin culture was transmitted from the travel to places either pillaging or trading with the settled communities for centuries. This ended during the French colonialist era following the treaty of Versailles.

Historic Bedouin cultural music, if sung, was always accompanied with the rababah. Bedouin music is near-inseparable from poetry as is much of the music traditions in the Middle East. Many of the songs are kept in an oral tradition due to the nomadic nature of the Bedouin tribes, however, some songs and stories were written down by al-Atrash (a cultural hero for the Syrian people who was defiant to opposing forces) who transcribed his work while imprisoned by the Ottoman Empire. al-Atrash wrote his work in the Shruqi genre which is used to tell of heroine tales of rebellion to an enemy or of captive poets who have been humiliated by the enemy. This written work had a great effect on southern Syrians bringing Shruqi and other Bedouin ideologies and practices to urban areas. Due to the geopolitical climate of the Middle East, urbanization has caused many of the nomadic cultures and rural regions to cluster or move altogether. This has brought more modernized musical instruments and oral poetry together which collaborate and are currently played throughout regions of the Middle East.

== Instruments ==
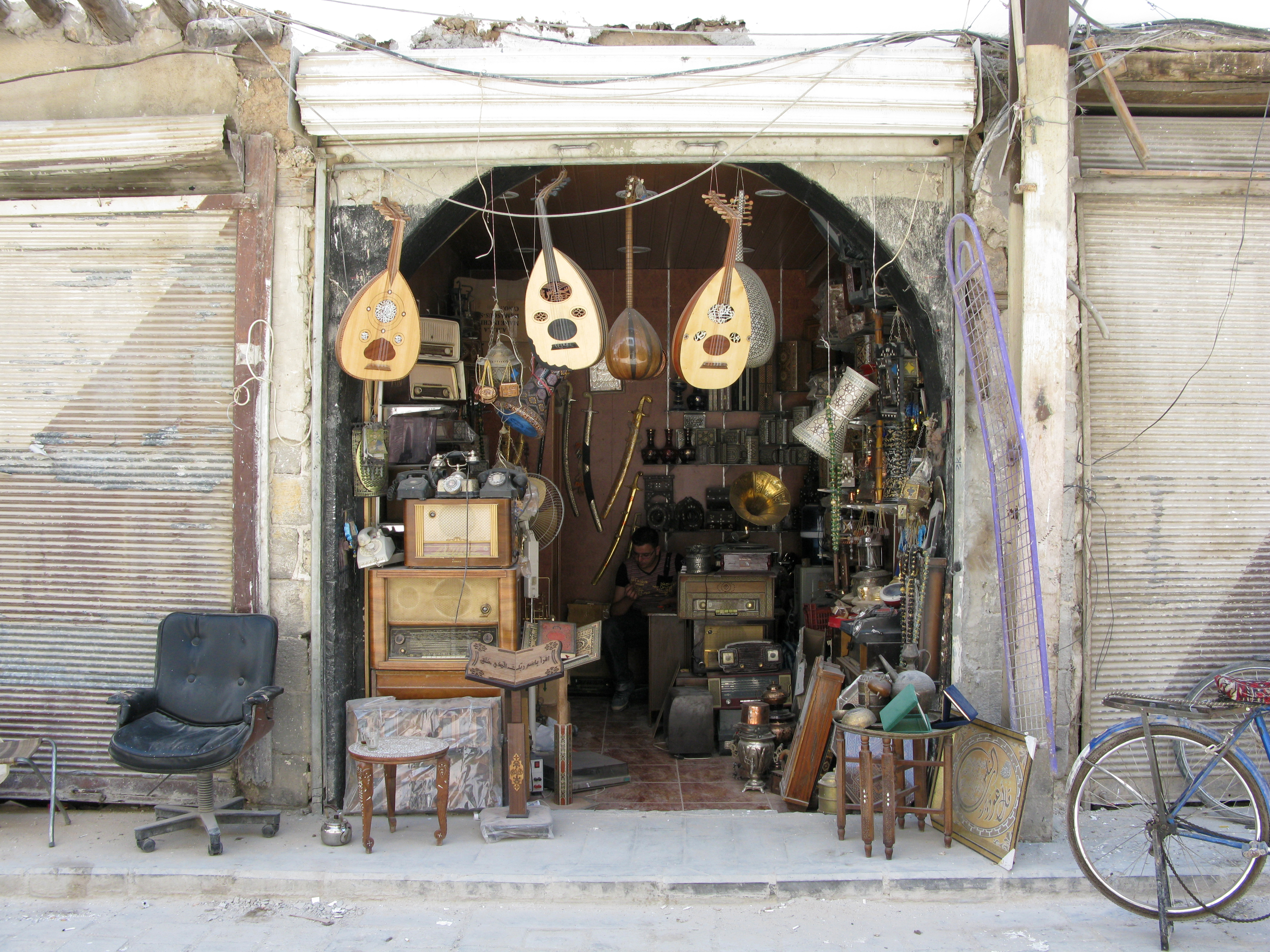

- Folk music of Syria is, for the most part, based on the oud, which is a stringed instrument considered to be the ancestor of the European lute.
- The ney (flute).
- Hand-held percussion instruments, such as the darbouka, daf or riq.
- Other typical instruments are the qanun and kamanjah.
- In semi-Nomadic regions, Bedouin music is based on the Mizmar, mijwiz and rababah is popular.

== Syrian classical Arabic music ==
=== Institutions ===
Syria's capital, Damascus, and the northern metropolis of Aleppo have long been one of the Arab world's centers of classical Arab music. In 1947 The Institute for Eastern Music was established, and in 1961 an institute teaching music was opened under the direction of Solhi al-Wadi. In 1963 a local branch of the Institute for Eastern Music was opened in Aleppo that included faculties for Western as well as for Arab music. In 1990, the Higher Institute of Music in Damascus was established as a conservatory for both Western and for Arabic music.

=== Muwashshah ===
A typical Syrian classical genre is the Muwashshah that goes back to around the 9th or 10th century. Performed by a lead singer or a choir, it consists of a classical form of Arabic poetry set to music. It usually consists of a multi-lined strophic verse poem written in classical Arabic, mostly consisting of five stanzas, which alternates with a refrain with a running rhyme. The muwashshah is usually opened with one or two lines matching the second part of the poem in rhyme and meter. The Al-Thurath ensemble specializes in this genre.

The city of Aleppo in Northern Syria is considered to be the centre of muwashshah.

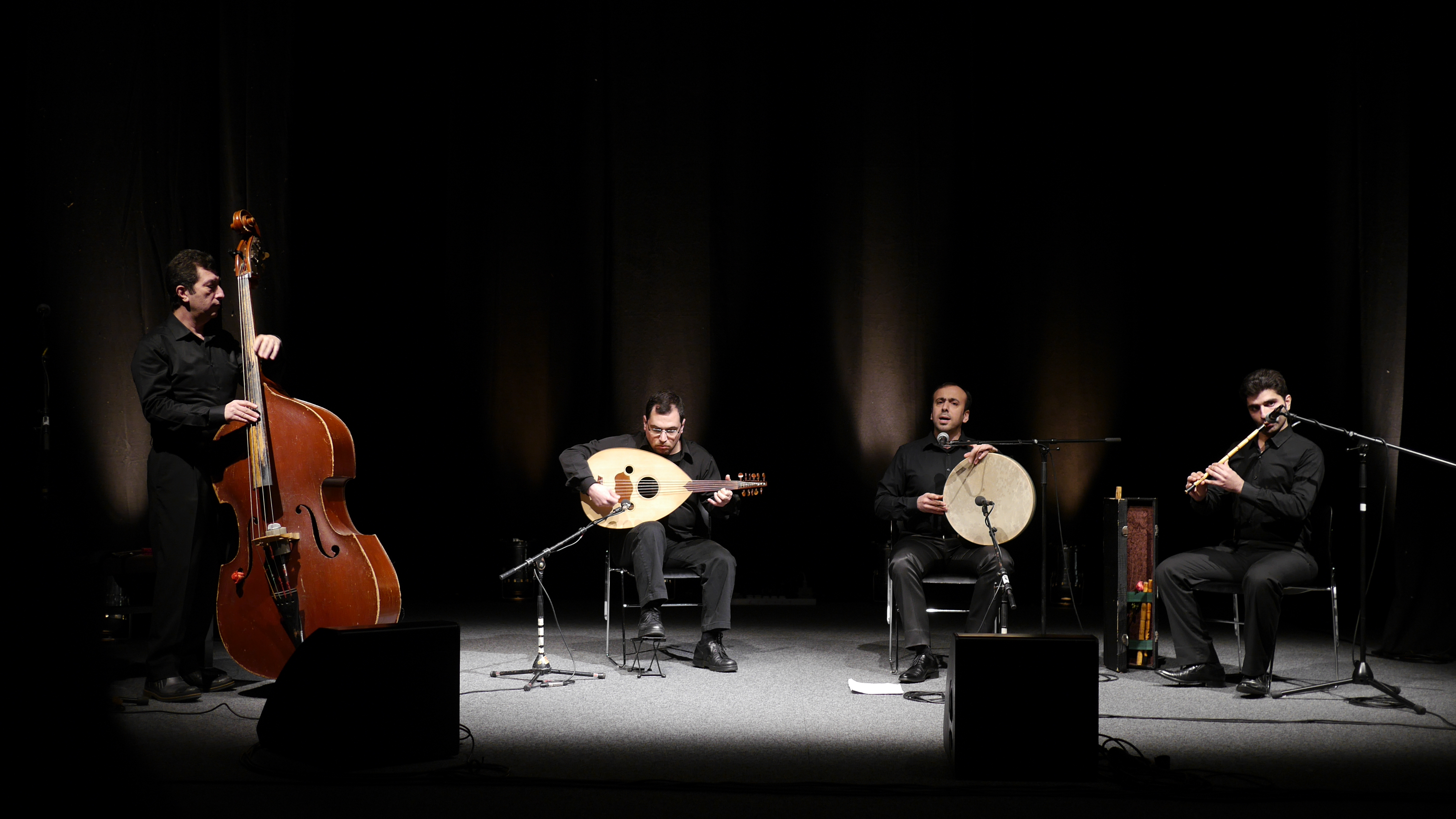
A group of Syrian musicians from Aleppo

=== Maqam ===
The classical music notation style of Syria is shared throughout the Arab world. This is known as maqam music which has first studies dating back to the 9nth century. Maqam'at (plural of maqam) were first theorized by al-Kindi between 801-873 and al-Farabi 870-950 where the music became more standardized. In the Arab world, as well as Turkey and Iran, there are a multitude of religions and cultures that have been present for centuries. Although there has been influence from empires and colonial forces bringing different musical traditions, countries like Syria and Lebanon have remained with the maqam tradition. Music in the Middle East differs to Eurocentric music in that it is usually played monophonically, that is, as a single melody. The monophic style allows most songs to be sung or played with the expectation that the melodic line will have improvisation or musical ornamentation. Arabic music is made up of small scales called jins/ajnas which are melodic motifs that have three or four pitches attributed to them. A maqam is a musical notation mode which is made of these three or four note jins/ajnas/scales. These tri, three-note, tetra, and four-note, scales are combined with usually two, sometimes three, jins/ajans (scales/modes) to create the maqam.

To understand the notation in maqamat musical style, it is easily understood when compared to the western notational style. The western notation is divided into twelve separate intervals creating a musical octave. The notation used in maqamat systems is divided into twenty-four intervals creating a distinction of the whole-tone, halftone and quarter-tone. Further into this division is the use of microtones which divide the quarter-tone making an even more subtle tone to express emotion through ornamentation. A maqam will use of the tones, half tones and quarter-tones in its construct.

=== Iqa'at ===
Iqa'at, or the singular iqa, is a particular rhythm that is to be played for every bar of a song. These rhythms are just a structure of what is usually played in the live performance. Ethnomusicologist Bruno Nettl describes Iqa'at as separated by order of stressed and unstressed patterns. Further, musicians will play a song that drifts from nonmetric (free time/metre) to metric (in a metre) and then change in its metre again depending on the song. Iqa'at has even and odd time signatures that go anywhere from no rhythm, to 2/4 time to 32/4 time.

== Syrian Christian music ==
Syria, being one of the countries where Christianity had originated, has a long history of church music. It is the origin of the Christian hymnody, which was entirely developed in Syria. And its style of chant, the Syrian chant which continues to be the liturgical music of some of the various Syrian Christians, is the oldest in the world.

There was formerly a distinctive tradition of Syrian Jewish religious music, which still flourishes in Syrian-Jewish communities around the world, such as New York City, Mexico City and Buenos Aires: see The Weekly Maqam, Baqashot and Pizmonim.

Much of the Syrian chant and other genres of Syrian music has been spread widely across the world due to the continual growth of the Syrian diaspora.

== Music of refugees ==
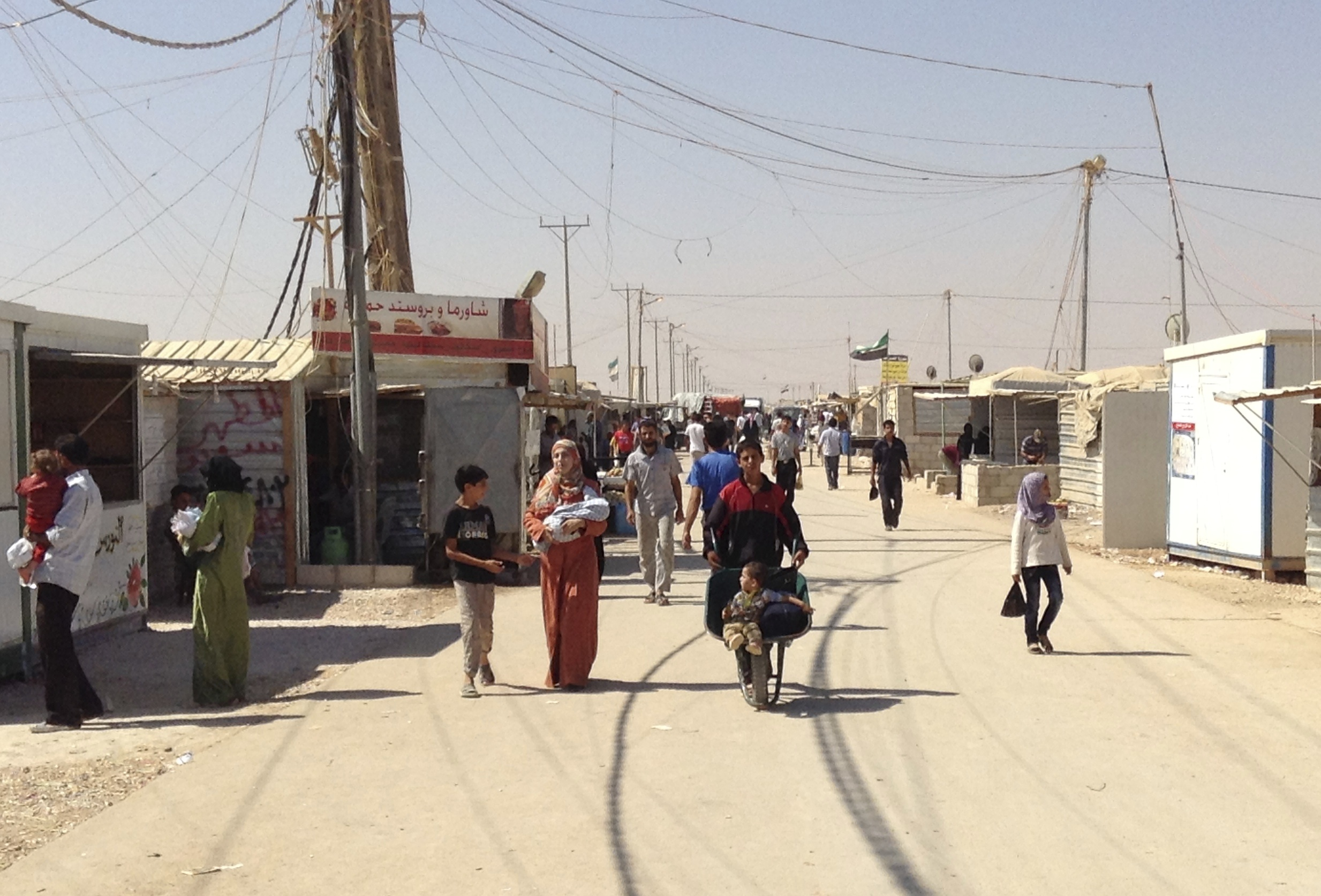

In contemporary times, Syria has become a country of great conflict. From this conflict has come a great diaspora of refugees leaving to find safety. Many have sought refuge in distant countries from their own, however, a number close to 622,000 Syrians are found in Jordan alone. The majority of the refugees travel to Jordan from Aleppo, Homs, and Dara'a. These are areas that have been greatly influenced by both Arabic classical music and Bedouin folk music. This is due to the amalgamation of culture that happened from the French mandate rule and its effects on Bedouin nomadic tribes losing their ability to travel freely. Further amalgamation is from the recent conflicts causing rural regions to enter the cities for geopolitical purposes. Through the displacement of their homes, Syrians have been on the move finding new places to seek asylum.

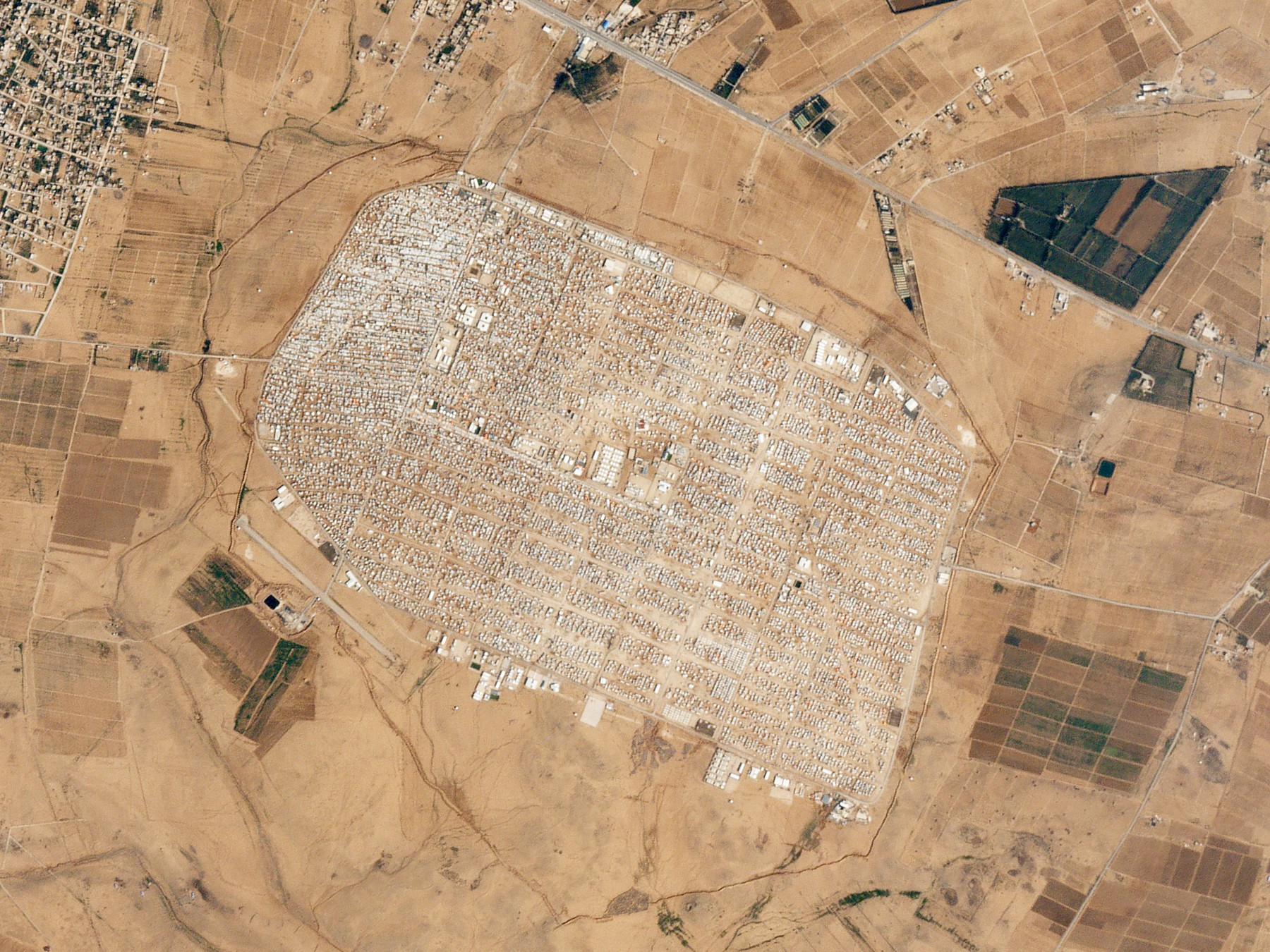

As the diaspora has increased in recent times due to increasing conflict, neighboring countries have taken in many refugees and provided temporary housing in refugee camps. In the Zaatari refugee camp there are 79,000 people. From the displacement of their homes, Syrians have turned to music for the purpose of mourning and comfort. Also, reporting on the events was made illegal with punishment of jail time making Syrian song the only platform of which to tell any source of information. Syrians have also kept their traditions and culture alive through the ancient practice of music playing.

This use of culture resembles possibly another influence that the Bedouin people have had on Syria as they have turned to ataba music to comfort and mourn their losses. There are many similarities between the Syrian refugee lifestyle and that of the traditional Bedouin culture.

- The first similarity is between the refugee camper and the Bedouin tent.
- Both are in the Levant desert.
- The nomadic nature of the recent refugees and the Bedouin people along with the oral culture that Bedouin and refugee people both share.

However, the most direct similarity is between the types of music that the Syrian refugees play and a traditional Bedouin genre. In the YouTube video Songs of Syrian Refugees – Documentary | Recording Earth written about in Alex Petropoulos's article in the Guardian, there are two men who sing in a traditional Bedouin genre known as ataba. Ataba music is reserved for the sentimental feelings usually associated with lamentations over loss. The YouTube video plays in this style of music varying only in the musicians use of the oud and not the Bedouin traditional rababah. This subtle difference can be explained by the modern diaspora of culture and the amalgamation of culture in the urban centers of the Middle East.

== Modern amalgamation and diaspora ==
Due to the rise in geopolitical conflict in the Middle East, there has been an amalgamation of cultures in the urban centres of the Levant. This has created a mixture of cultures that have borrowed styles and sounds from one another with a mixture of classical music and instruments, Bedouin genres and poetical traditions, and the more subtle yet distinct differences that each community and region has in the Levant. This amalgamation has been going on for many centuries as a product of the historical conflicts that have happened throughout Middle Eastern history. This has made Syrian traditions change in style while also becoming necessary to practice for the survival of culture and traditions as was/ is the case for Syriac chant. There is now Syrian music played throughout the world due to the historical diaspora and movement by the Syrian people.

As in other countries, modern Syrian music notably contrasts its folk music. It uses an orchestra of mostly European instruments with one lead vocalist and sometimes a backup chorus. This type of music is very popular in the Middle East. Famous singers are Assala Nasri, Farid al-Atrash, Fahd Ballan, Sabah Fakhri, Mayada El Hennawy and George Wassouf.

== Syrian dances ==
One of the most popular dances in Syria is the Dabkeh, a folk dance combining circle dancing and line dancing formed from right to left and headed by a leader which alternates between facing the audience and other dancers. It is mostly performed at weddings and other joyous occasions, but also has accompanied protest meetings during the Syrian Civil War. Other popular folklore dances include the "Arāḍa" (Arabic: عراضة), a dance performed with swords, as well as oriental dance for women.

== See also ==
- Culture of Syria
- Arabic music
- Syrian chant
- Muwashshah
- Contemporary underground music in Syria
