= Contemporary music =

Contemporary music is whatever music is produced at the current time. Specifically, it could refer to:

== Genres or audiences ==
- Adult contemporary music
- British contemporary R&B
- Christian adult contemporary
- Christian contemporary hit radio
- Contemporary a cappella
- Contemporary blues
- Contemporary Catholic liturgical music
- Contemporary Christian music
- Contemporary classical music
- Contemporary commercial music
- Contemporary folk music
- Contemporary hit radio
- Contemporary improvisation
- Contemporary Jewish religious music
- Contemporary laïkó
- Contemporary R&B
- Contemporary soul
- Contemporary worship music
- New adult contemporary
- Rhythmic adult contemporary
- Rhythmic contemporary
- Urban adult contemporary
- Urban contemporary gospel
- Urban contemporary music

== Regions ==
- Contemporary music of France
- Contemporary music of Indonesia
- Contemporary music of Madagascar
- Malaysian contemporary music
- Contemporary underground music in Syria

== Institutions ==
- Academy of Contemporary Music
- Advanced School of Contemporary Music
- ARChive of Contemporary Music
- Association for Contemporary Music
- Center for Contemporary Music
- Center for Contemporary Opera
- Contemporary Music Project
- Cornel School of Contemporary Music
- Edition of Contemporary Music
- INSAM Institute for Contemporary Artistic Music
- International Society for Contemporary Music
- Judith Wright Centre of Contemporary Arts
- London Centre of Contemporary Music
- Quebec Contemporary Music Society
- Rimon School of Jazz and Contemporary Music
- School of Jazz and Contemporary Music

== Ensembles ==
- Accessible Contemporary Music
- Birmingham Contemporary Music Group
- Concorde Contemporary Music Ensemble
- The Contemporary Singers of Australia
- Contemporary Youth Orchestra
- The Group for Contemporary Music
- NOTUS, the Contemporary Vocal Ensemble
- San Francisco Contemporary Music Players

== Festivals ==
- Cabrillo Festival of Contemporary Music
- Glastonbury Festival of Contemporary Performing Arts
- Huddersfield Contemporary Music Festival
- London Festival of Contemporary Church Music
- Royan Festival for Contemporary Music
- Tehran Contemporary Music Festival
- Ultima Oslo Contemporary Music Festival
- University of Plymouth Contemporary Music Festival

== Albums ==
- Cal Tjader Plays the Contemporary Music of Mexico and Brazil
- Contemporary Jazz (Branford Marsalis album)
- Contemporary Jeep Music
- Dreamweapon: An Evening of Contemporary Sitar Music
- Jazz Contemporary (Kenny Dorham album)
- The Modern Jazz Society Presents a Concert of Contemporary Music

== Publications ==
- Apostles of Rock: The Splintered World of Contemporary Christian Music
- Contemporary Christian Music Magazine
- Contemporary Country

== Awards ==
- Grammy Award for Best Contemporary Christian Music Album
- Grammy Award for Best Contemporary Christian Music Performance/Song
- Grammy Award for Best Contemporary Christian Music Song
- Grammy Award for Best Contemporary R&B Album
- Grammy Award for Best Contemporary World Music Album
- Grammy Award for Best Gospel/Contemporary Christian Music Performance
- Helpmann Award for Best Contemporary Concert Presentation

== Instruments ==
- Contemporary harpsichord

== See also ==
- List of 21st-century classical composers
- 21st-century music
- List of artists who reached number one on the U.S. Adult Contemporary chart
- List of contemporary classical violinists
- List of Billboard Top Contemporary Christian Albums number ones of the 1990s
- Category:Lists of number-one adult contemporary songs in the United States
- Contemporary art
