= Loay Nasr =

Syrian singer

- Origin: Aleppo, Syria
- Genres: Syrian, Arabic Music
- Occupation: Singer
- Instrument(s): Guitar, drums, banjo, violin, harmonica, accordion, synthesizer vocals
- Years active: 2015–present
- Labels: Social Entertainment

Loay Nasr (Arabic: لؤي نصر) is a Syrian singer. whose diverse vocal ability and style have attracted a following from different countries in the Arab world.

== Discography ==
=== Singles ===
- Khles El Saber Meni (2015)

== Videography ==
Official music videos
Year	Title	Album	Director
2016	Khles El Saber Meni	Single	Ali Mahmoud
