= Culture of Syria =

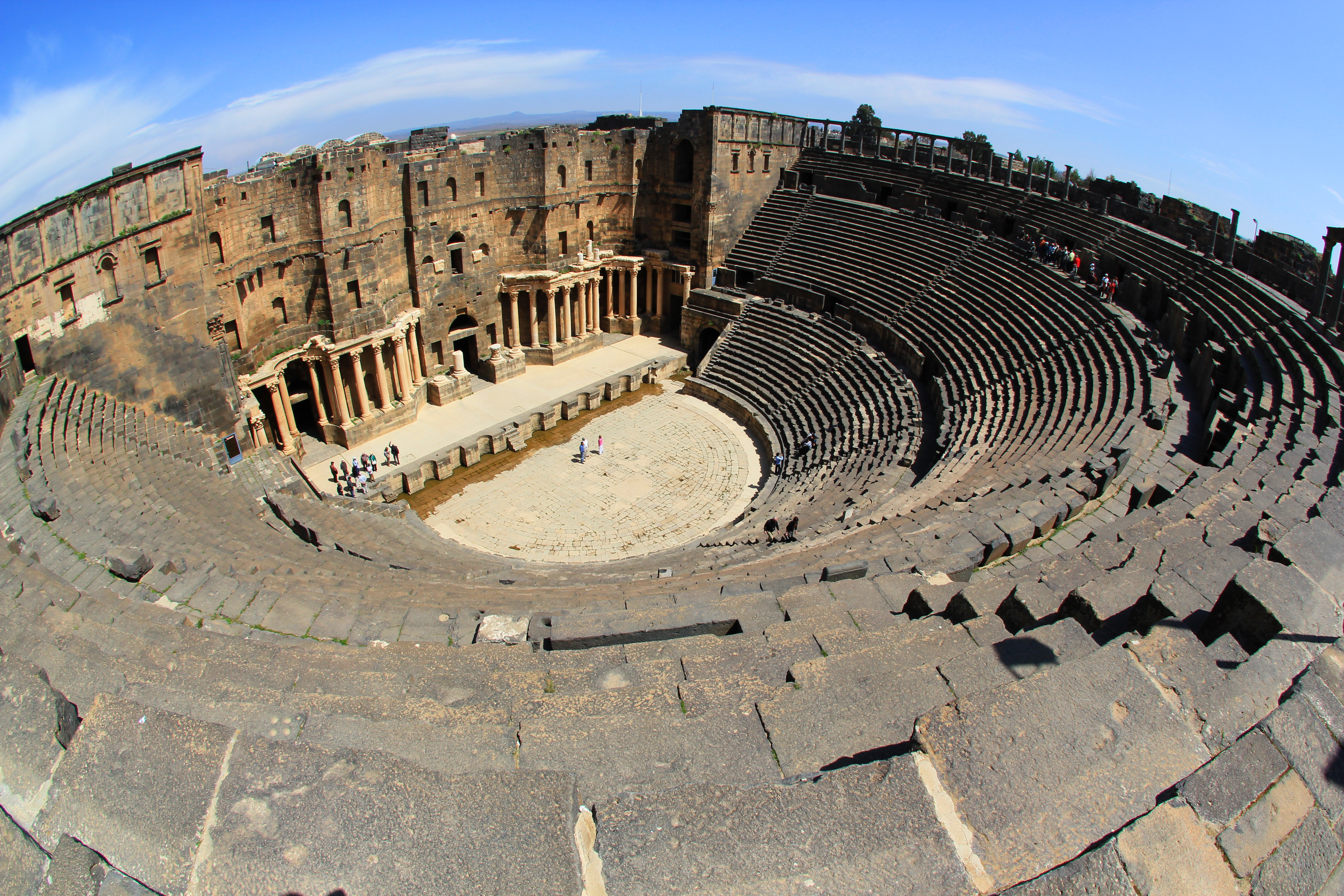
The Roman Theatre at Bosra, one of Syria's best preserved monuments from Roman times. Syria's long and rich history plays a huge part in its culture.

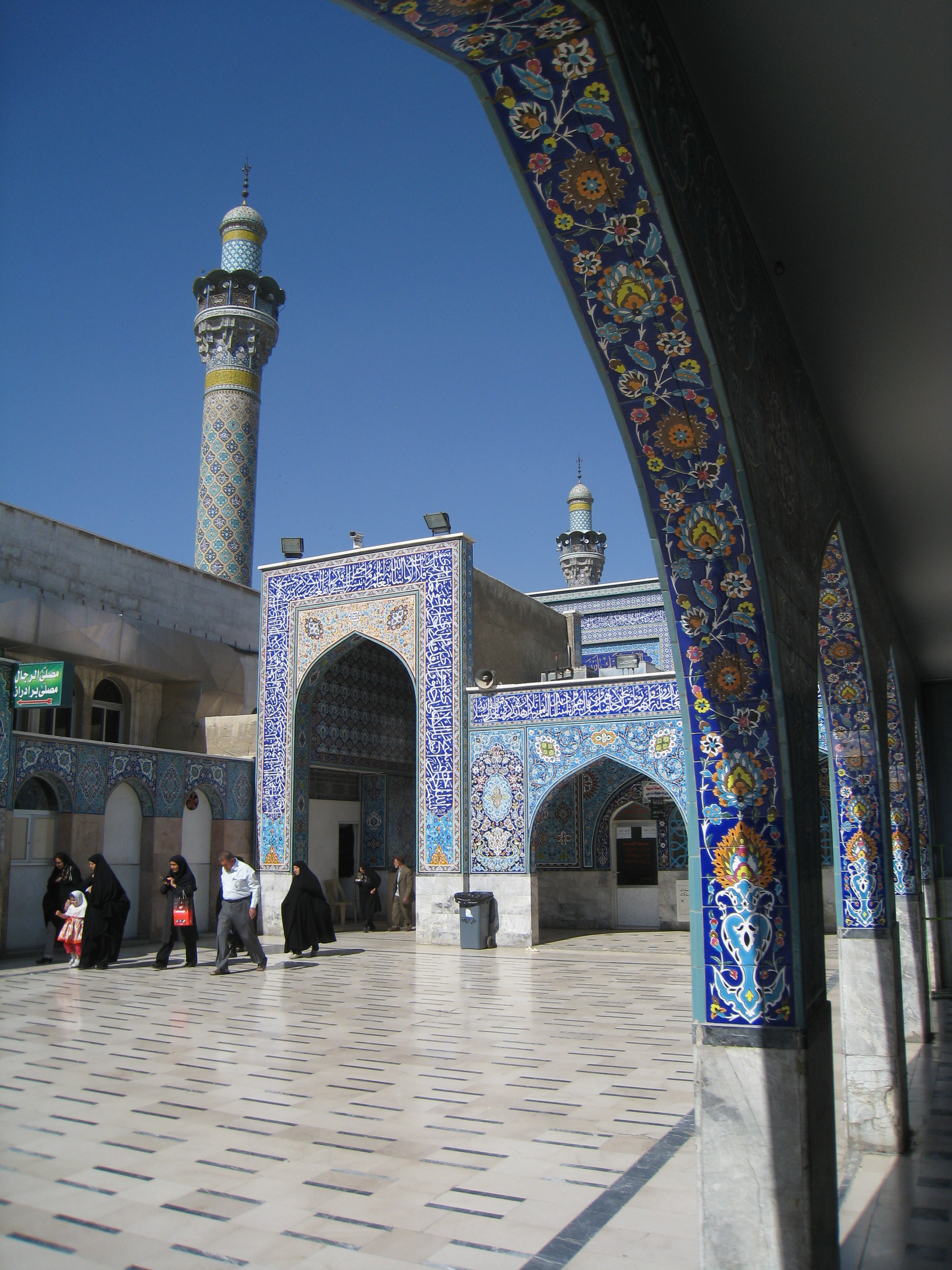
Sayyidah Zaynab shrine courtyard

Syria is a traditional society with a long cultural history. The Syrian's taste for the traditional arts is expressed in dances such as the al-Samah, the Dabkeh in all their variations and the sword dance. Marriage ceremonies are occasions for the lively demonstration of folk customs.

The scribes of the city of Ugarit (modern Ras Shamra) created a cuneiform alphabet in the 14th century BC. The alphabet was written in the familiar order we use today like the English language, however with different characters.

Archaeologists have discovered extensive writings and evidence of a culture rivaling those of Iraq, and Egypt in and around the ancient city of Ebla (modern Tell Mardikh). Later Syrian scholars and artists contributed to Hellenistic and Roman thought and culture. Cicero was a pupil of Antiochus of Ascalon at Athens; and the writings of Posidonius of Apamea influenced Livy and Plutarch.

== Literature ==
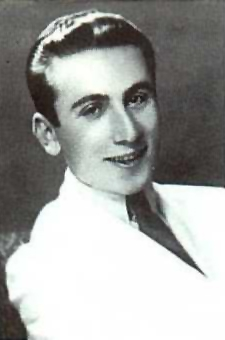
Nizar Qabbani's style explored themes of love, eroticism, religion, and Arab nationalism.

Syrians have contributed to Arabic literature for centuries, and Syrian writers played a crucial role in the nahda or Arab literary and cultural revival of the 19th century. Prominent contemporary Syrian writers include, among others, Adonis, Muhammad Maghout, Haidar Haidar, Ghada al-Samman, Nizar Qabbani and Zakariyya Tamer.

In 1948, the partitioning of neighbouring Palestine and the establishment of Israel brought about a new turning point in Syrian writing. Adab al-Iltizam, the "literature of political commitment", deeply marked by social realism, mostly replaced the romantic trend of the previous decades. Hanna Mina, rejecting art for art's sake and confronting the social and political issues of his time, was arguably the most prominent Syrian novelist of this era. Following the Six-Day War in 1967, Adab al-Naksa, the "literature of defeat", grappled with the causes of the Arab defeat.

The historical novel genre, which was made popular by Fawwaz Haddad. is sometimes used as a means of critiquing the present through a depiction of the past. Syrian folk narrative, as a subgenre of historical fiction, is imbued with magical realism, and is also used as a means of veiled criticism of the present. Salim Barakat, a Syrian émigré living in Sweden, is one of the leading figures of the genre. Contemporary Syrian literature also encompasses science fiction and futuristic utopiae, which may also serve as media of dissent.

=== Poetry ===
Syria has always been one of Arabic poetry's centers of innovation and has a proud tradition of oral and written poetry. It has contributed to Arabic poetry mostly in the classical and traditional Arabic genres with influence from the French Romantic influences brought to the country while under French rule.

One of the most prominent Syrian poets include Badawi al-Jabal, whose poetic style was classical Arabic prose, based on the Abbasid-era tradition. His work is mostly influenced to some extents by his experience of exile, poverty and political activism, and he's considered to be "one of the greatest poets of the old school".

Another prominent Syrian poet was Damascus-born Nizar Qabbani whose poetic style is famed for its simplicity yet elegance in exploring themes of love, eroticism, sexuality and religion. He is considered one of the most revered contemporary poets in the Arab world. He is known to be one of the most feminist and progressive intellectuals of his time, being inspired by the social conditions of traditional Syrian and Arab society, most notably his sister's suicide to escape an arranged loveless marriage. for example, when asked whether he was a revolutionary, Qabbani answered: "Love in the Arab world is like a prisoner, and I want to set (it) free. I want to free the Arab soul, sense and body with my poetry. The relationships between men and women in our society are not healthy.". Following the Six-Day War Qabbani's poems took a more politically charged turn, which resulted in harsh criticism against the poet. One of his most famed poems is Balqis, a poem in which he laments the death of his Iraq-born wife who was killed in the 1981 Iraqi embassy bombing in Beirut during the Lebanese Civil War. Qabbani blames the entire Arab world for her death, which generated a lot of controversy against the poet.

== Music and dance ==
Syria's capital, Damascus, has long been one of the Arab world's centers for cultural and artistic innovation, especially in the field of classical Arab music. In 1947 The eastern music Institute was established, in 1961 - a music school which developed until it was possible to establish in year 1990 a High Institute of Music in Damascus. Syria has also produced several pan-Arab stars. Asmahan, Farid al-Atrash and singer Lena Chamamyan. The city of Aleppo is known for its muwashshah, a form of Andalous sung poetry popularized by Sabri Moudallal, as well as popular stars like Sabah Fakhri.

Syria's folk music is for the most part based on the oud, the ney and lap-held drums, with little if any vocal accompaniment. In Nomadic regions, Bedouin music which is based on the Mizmar and Rebab is popular.

Modern Syrian music notably contrasts folk music. It uses an orchestra of mostly European instruments with one lead vocalists and a backup chorus. This type of music is widespread, especially among young people, including Assala Nassri, Farid al-Atrash, Fahd Ballan, Sabah Fakhri, Mayada El Hennawy, Rushwan al-Deek and George Wassouf.

Syria was one of the earliest centers of Christian hymnody, in a repertory known as Syrian chant, which continues to be the liturgical music of some of the various Syrian Christians. Also, there was a former distinctive tradition of Syrian Jewish religious music, which still flourishes in the Syrian-Jewish community of New York.

One of the most popular dances in Syria is the Dabkeh, a folk dance combining circle dancing and line dancing formed from right to left and headed by a leader which alternates between facing the audience and other dancers. It is mostly performed at weddings and other joyous occasions. Other popular folklore dances include the "Arāḍa" (Arabic: عراضة), a dance performed with swords as well as oriental dance for women.

== Architecture ==
Traditional Houses of the Old Cities in Damascus, Aleppo and some other Syrian cities are preserved and traditionally the living quarters are arranged around one or more courtyards, typically with a fountain in the middle supplied by spring water, and decorated with citrus trees, grape vines, and flowers.

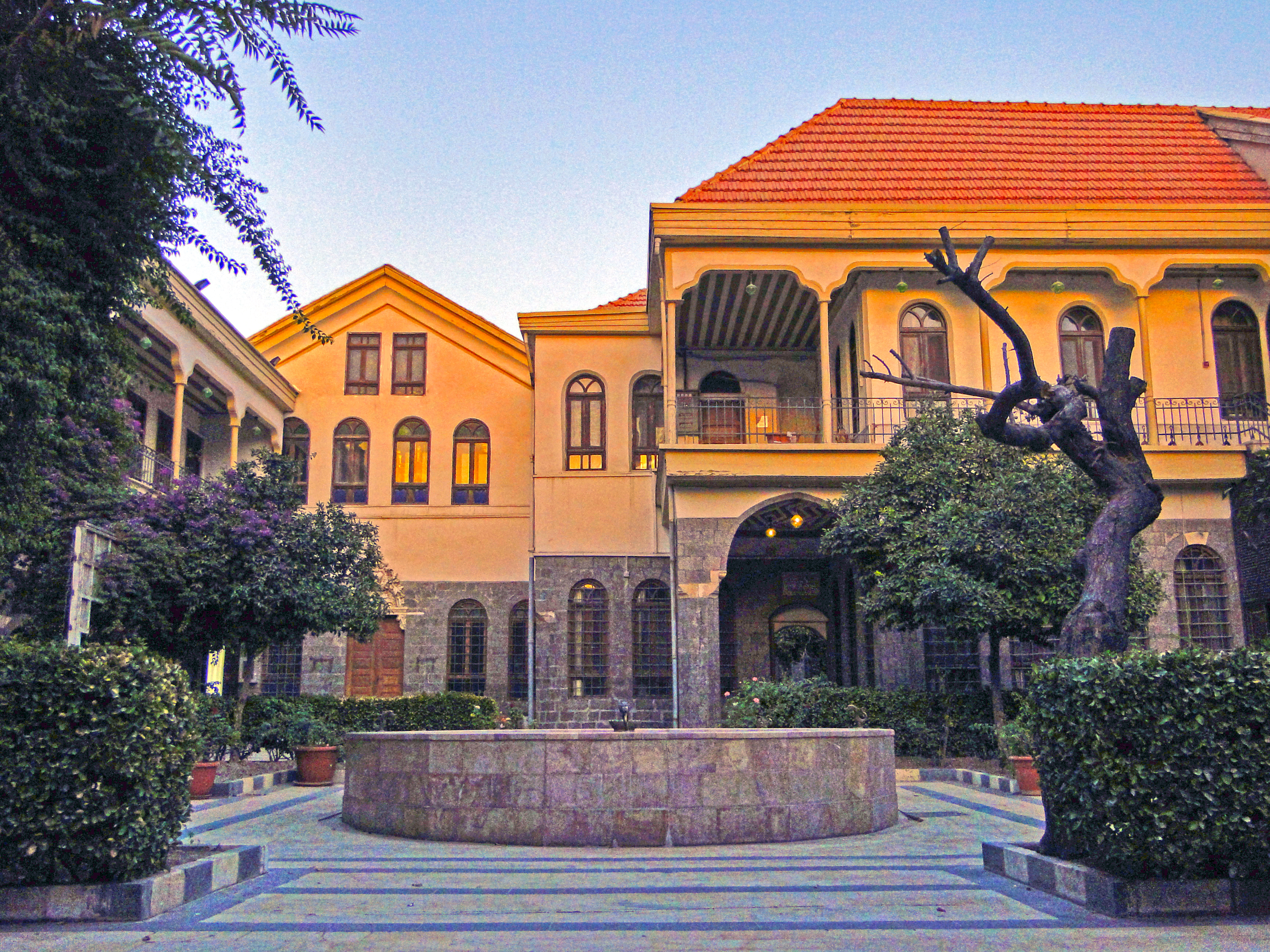
Maktab Anbar in the Ancient City of Damascus

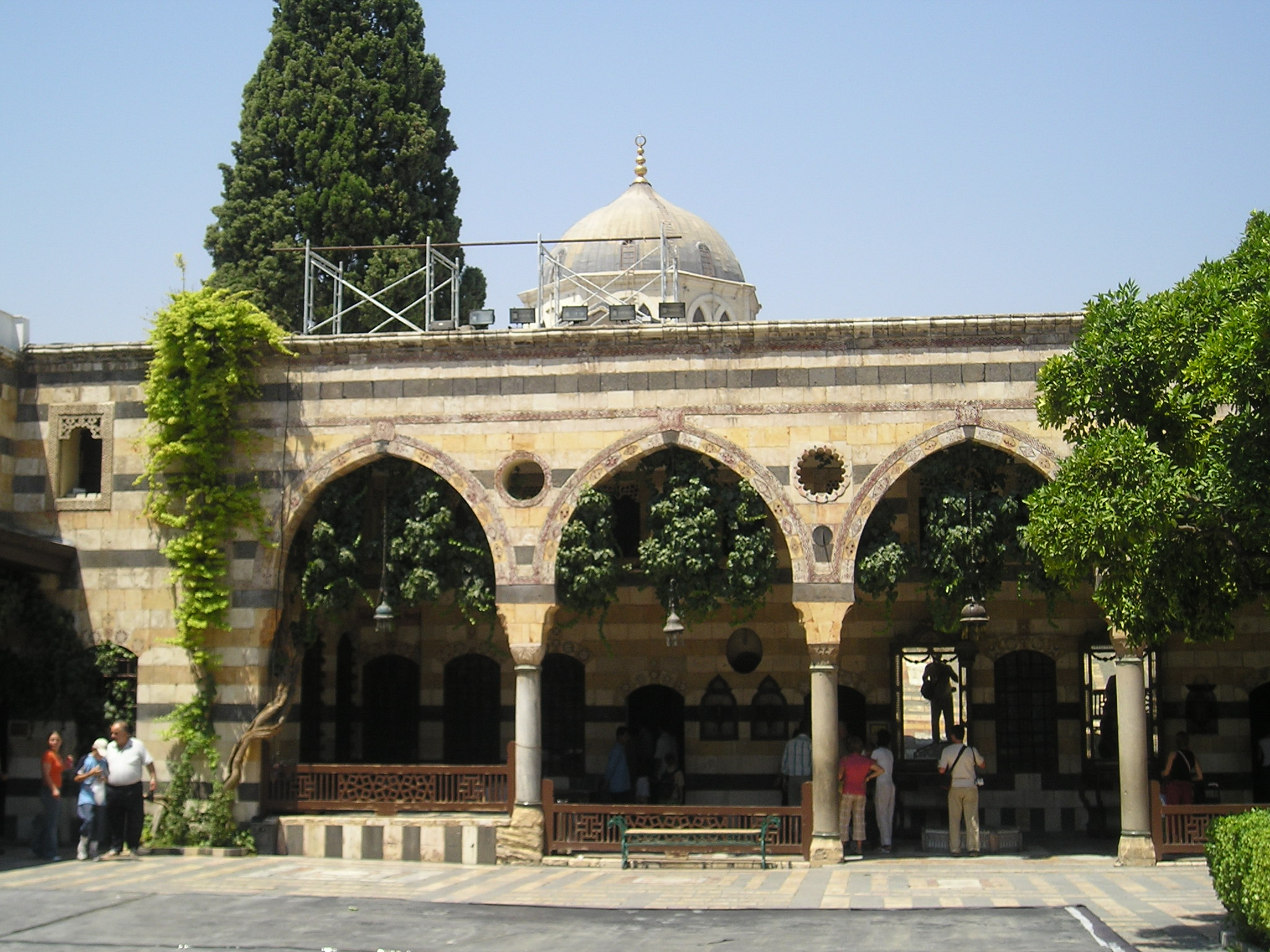
Azm Palace, 18th century residence of Ottoman governor of Damascus

One of the most notable examples of the traditional Damascene homes is the 18th century Azm Palace, residence of As'ad Pasha al-Azm, the Ottoman governor of Damascus, which continued to house the descendants of the al-Azm family for decades. The structure consists of several buildings and three wings: the harem, the selamlek and the khademlek. The harem is the family wing, which contains the private residence of the family and includes the baths, which are a replica of the public baths in the city on a smaller scale. The selamlek is the guest wing, and it comprises the formal halls, reception areas and large courtyards with traditional cascading fountain, while in the northern part of the palace were the servant quarters and the center of housekeeping activities. Also a notable example of traditional Damascene houses is Maktab Anbar near the Umayyad Mosque and a short distance from the Street Called Straight. It was built as a private residence by a local Jewish notable Mr. Anbar in the mid 19th century before being confiscated by the Ottoman government after Anbar's bankruptcy.

Outside of larger city areas such as Damascus, Aleppo or Homs, residential areas are often clustered in smaller villages. The buildings themselves are often quite old (perhaps a few hundred years old), passed down to family members over several generations. Residential construction of rough concrete and blockwork is usually unpainted, and the palette of a Syrian village is therefore simple tones of grays and browns.

== Media ==
Television in Syria was formed in 1960, when Syria and Egypt (which adopted television that same year) were part of the United Arab Republic. It broadcast in black and white until 1976. The Arab League officially asked the satellite operators Arabsat and Nilesat to stop broadcasting Syrian media in June 2012.

There was a private sector presence in the Syrian cinema industry until the end of the 1970s, but private investment has since preferred the more lucrative television serial business. Syrian soap operas, in a variety of styles (all melodramatic, however), have considerable market penetration throughout the eastern Arab world.

The authorities operate several intelligence agencies among them Shu'bat al-Mukhabarat al-'Askariyya, employing a large number of operatives.

== Cuisine ==
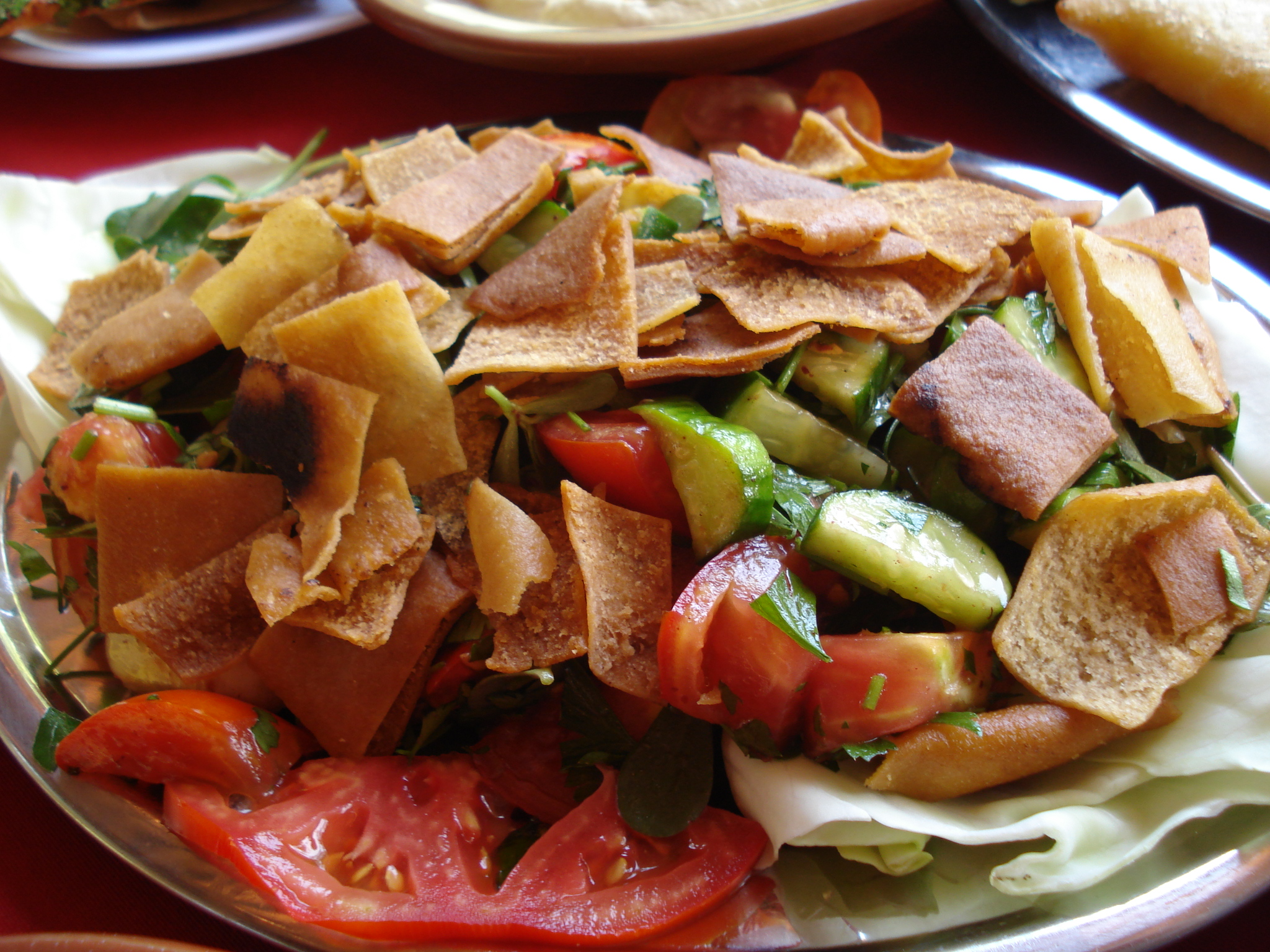
Fattoush, an example of Syrian cuisine

Syrian cuisine is rich and varied in its ingredients and is linked to the regions of Syria where a specific dish has originated. Syrian food mostly consists of Southern Mediterranean, Greek, and Southwest Asian dishes. Some Syrian dishes also evolved from Turkish and French cooking. Dishes like shish kebab, stuffed zucchini/courgette, yabra' (stuffed grape leaves, the word yapra' derives from the Turkish word 'yaprak' meaning leaf).

The main dishes that form Syrian cuisine are kibbeh, hummus, tabbouleh, fattoush, labneh, shawarma, mujaddara, shanklish, pastırma, sujuk and baklava. Baklava is made of filo pastry filled with chopped nuts and soaked in honey. Syrians often serve selections of appetizers, known as meze, before the main course. Za'atar, minced beef, and cheese manakish are popular hors d'œuvres. The Arabic flatbread khubz is always eaten together with meze.

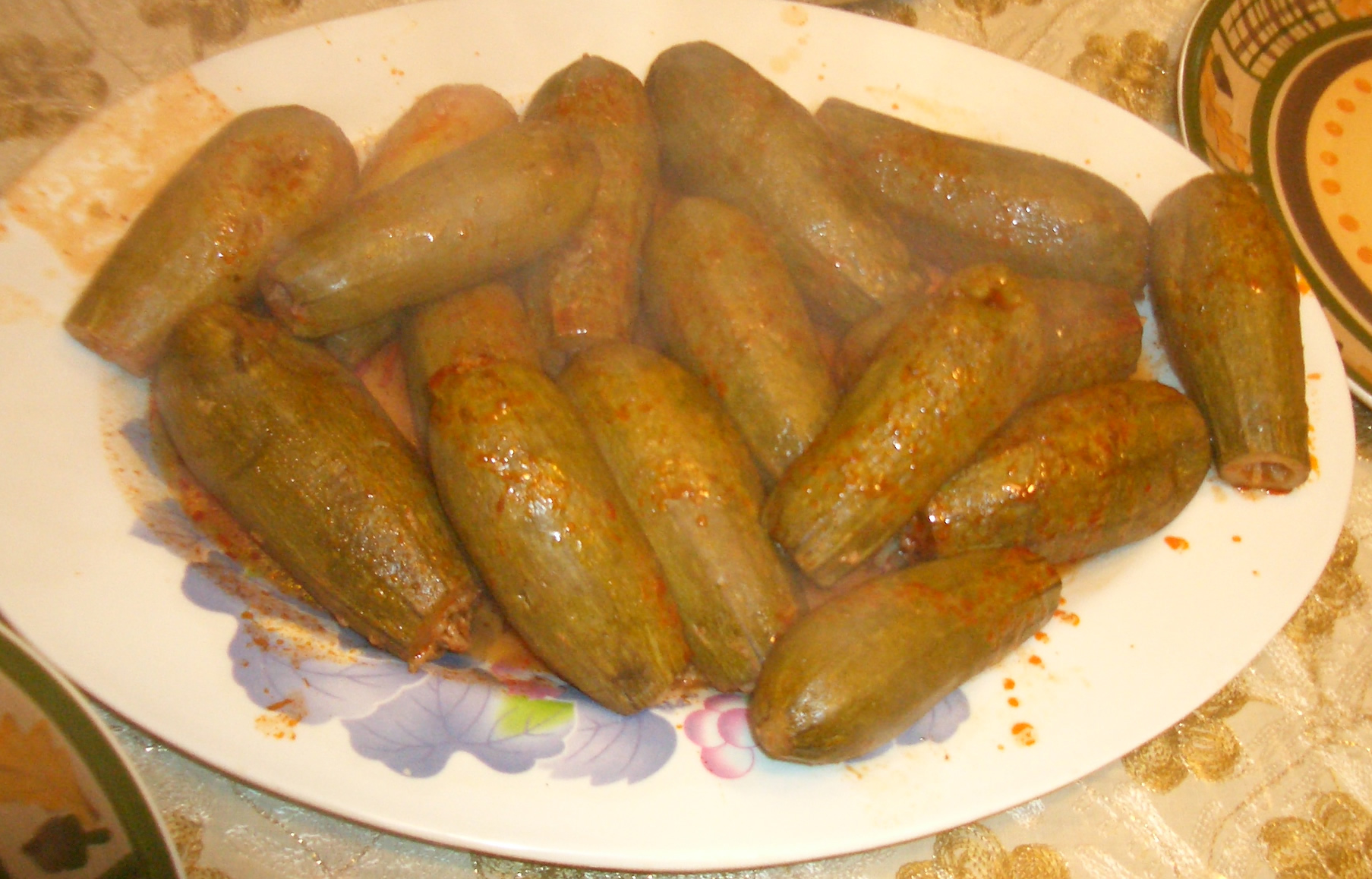
Kousa mahshi

Syrians are also well known for their cheese. The very popular string cheese jibbneh mashallale is made of curd cheese and is pulled and twisted together. Syrians also make cookies/biscuits to usually accompany their cheese called ka'ak. These are made of farina and other ingredients, rolled out, shaped into rings and baked. Another form of a similar cookie is filled with crushed dates mixed with butter, to accompany jibbneh mashallale.

Drinks in Syria vary depending on the time of day and the occasion. Arabic coffee, also known as Turkish coffee, is the most well-known hot drink usually prepared in the morning at breakfast or in the evening. It is usually served for guests or after food. Arak, an alcoholic drink, is also a well-known beverage served mostly on special occasions. More examples of Syrian beverages include Ayran, Jallab, White coffee, and a locally manufactured beer called Al Shark.

== Sports ==
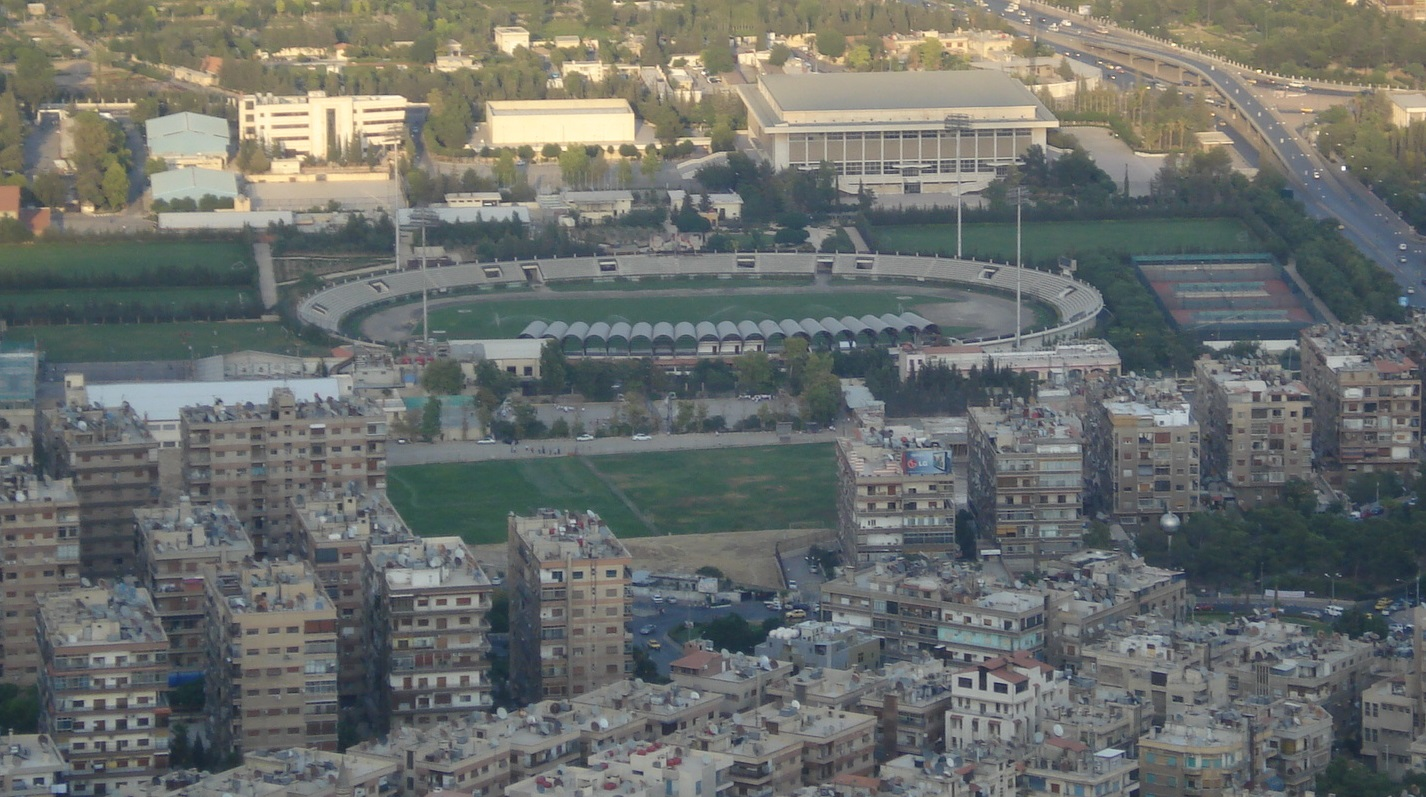
Al-Fayhaa Sports Complex

The most popular sports in Syria are football, basketball, swimming, and tennis. Damascus was home to the fifth and seventh Pan Arab Games, while Latakia, Syria's main port, was home to the tenth Mediterranean Games.

Although the Abbasiyyin Stadium in Damascus is home to the Syrian national football team, many other local teams are based in other cities and stadiums. Syria's national team enjoyed some success, having qualified for four Asian Cup competitions. The team's first international was on 20 November 1949, losing to Turkey 7–0. The Syrian national football team's biggest win was with the Maldives, beating them 12-0 on 4 June 1997. The team was ranked 75th in the world by FIFA as of 2018.

Although Syria has never qualified for the World Cup finals, its national football team reached the fourth round in 2018 after tying with Iran. They tied with the Australian team on the 5th of October before losing to them 2-1 on the 10 October and disqualifying. A win would have seen them play Honduras in an intercontinental playoff, if they won that, they would have qualified for the 2018 FIFA World Cup

The highest division of football in Syria is the Syrian Premier League which began to play in 1966. The league's champion is Al-Jaish SC, based in Damascus.

== Fairs and festivals ==
Festival/Fair	City	Date
Spring Festival of Hama	Hama	April
Flower Festival (معرض الزهور)	Latakia	April
Assyrian New Year Festival	Qamishli	April
Nowruz Kurdish New Year Festival	Qamishli	21 March
Traditional Festival	Palmyra	May
International Flower Fair	Damascus	May
Syrian Song Festival (مهرجان الأغنية السورية)	Aleppo	July
Marmarita Festival	Homs	August
Joy in God, Murshdi festival		25 August
Festival of le Crac des Chevaliers and the Valley for Arts&Culture	Homs	August
Vine Festival	As Suwayda	September
Cotton Festival	Aleppo	September
Damascus International Fair	Damascus	September
Festival of Love and Peace	Lattakia	2–12 August
Bosra Festival	Bosra	September
Film and Theatre Festival	Damascus	November
Cultural Festival of Jableh	Jableh	July
Jasmine Festival	Damascus	April

== See also ==
- Culture of Asia

== Sources ==
- Zuhur, Sherifa (2000), Asmahan's Secrets: Woman, War, and Song, University of Texas Press, ISBN 978-0-292-79807-6
