= Accessible Contemporary Music =

Access Contemporary Music is a Chicago based contemporary music ensemble. In addition to giving live concert of music by living composers they have initiated several innovative web-based projects to help spread contemporary music to as diverse an audience as possible.

== Web based projects ==
Web based projects include Weekly Readings in which they record a different piece of music every week and post it to their website, Spotlight Double Bass, a collaboration with the International Society of Bassists, and Composer Alive.

=== Composer Alive ===
The first Composer Alive project was a collaboration between ACM and Beijing based composer Xiaogang Ye in the summer of 2006. Ye composed Datura, which is now published by Schott music, and traveled to Chicago for the World Premiere at the Chicago Cultural Center.

ACM's other projects include Sound of Silent Film and Noteplay, an event that allows children to discover the joys of creating and manipulating sound.
