= The Rise of the Great Powers =

Chinese documentary television series

- Also known as: Da Guo Jue Qi
- Genre: Documentary
- Written by: Chen Jin
- Directed by: Ren Xue'an
- Presented by: Zhao Huayong
- Narrated by: Sun Zhanshan
- Composers: Ye Xiaogang; China Philharmonic Orchestra
- Country of origin: China
- Original language: Mandarin
- No. of episodes: 12

Production
- Executive producers: Guo Zhenxi; Han Zhengqun; Gao Xiaoping
- Producers: Luo Ming; Yuan Zhengming
- Production location: China
- Running time: 50 minutes per episode
- Production companies: CCTV; China Television Media, Ltd 北京三多堂影視廣告有限公司 北京水晶石數字科技有限公司

Original release
- Network: CCTV-2

The Rise of the Great Powers
- Traditional Chinese: 大國崛起
- Simplified Chinese: 大国崛起
Transcriptions
Standard Mandarin
- Hanyu Pinyin: Dà Guó Jué Qǐ

The Rise of the Great Powers is a 12-part Chinese documentary television series produced by CCTV. It was first broadcast on CCTV-2 from 13 to 24 November 2006. It discusses the rise of nine great powers: Portugal, Spain, the Netherlands, the United Kingdom, France, Germany, Japan, Russia (Soviet Union), and the United States.

The documentary "endorses the idea that China should study the experiences of nations and empires it once condemned as aggressors bent on exploitation" and analyzes the reasons why the nine nations rose to become great powers, from the Portuguese Empire to American hegemony. The series was produced by an "elite team of Chinese historians" who also briefed the Politburo on the subject." In the West the airing of Rise of the Great Powers has been seen as a sign that China is becoming increasingly open to discussing its growing international power and influence—referred to by the Chinese government as "China's peaceful rise."

The state-run People's Daily reported that each of the 12 episodes of The Rise of the Great Powers ran at the prime time 9:30 p.m. slot, and each show lasted 50 minutes, totaling 600 minutes. The program included interviews with noted historians and academics, including Paul Kennedy, who wrote the influential book The Rise and Fall of the Great Powers, and Joseph Stiglitz, who won a Nobel Prize in Economics. Political leaders, such as former French president Valéry Giscard d'Estaing and former Malaysian prime minister Mahathir Mohamad, were also interviewed."

It has been dubbed in English and shown on History Channel under the title Rising of Great Powers.

== List of episodes ==
The original titles of the 12 episodes (in Chinese) are listed as follows, each with an accompanying rough translation in English.

1. 海洋时代：开篇与葡萄牙、西班牙 (Age of Seafaring: The Opening, Portugal and Spain)
2. 小国大业：荷兰 (A Small Nation with a Great Cause: the Netherlands)
3. 走向现代：英国 (Advancement Towards a Modern Age: Britain)
4. 工业先声：英国 (The Pioneer of Industrialisation: Britain)
5. 激情岁月：法国 (Years of Enthusiasm: France)
6. 帝国春秋：德国 (History of an Empire: Germany)
7. 百年维新：日本 (A Century of Reform: Japan)
8. 寻道图强：沙俄 (Seeking the Way to Strengthen the Nation: Tsarist Russia)
9. 风云新途：苏联 (An Unstable Situation and a New Path: Soviet Union)
10. 新国新梦：美国 (A New Nation and a New Dream: United States)
11. 危局新政：美国 (Crisis and the New Deal: United States)
12. 大道行思：结篇 (Thoughts on the Great Path: Conclusion)

== Reception ==
In an interview, former Singapore Prime Minister Lee Kuan Yew made references to the series:

I don't know if you've been seeing this or heard of this series that [the Chinese] produced called The Rise of the Great Nations. It's now on the History Channel. I got our station here to dub it in English and show it. It was quite I would say a bold decision to tell the Chinese people this is the way the European nations, the Russians and Japanese became great. Absolutely no ideology and they had a team of historians, their own historians. To get the program going, they went to each country, interviewed the leaders and historians of those countries.

You should watch the one on Britain, because I think that gives you an idea of how far they have gone in telling their people this is what made Britain great. I was quite surprised. The theme was [doing away with] the Divine Right of Kings, a Britain that was challenged by the barons who brought the king down to Runnymede and then they had the Magna Charta, and suddenly your "Divine Right" is based on Parliament and [the barons] are in Parliament. That gave the space for the barons to grow and the middle class eventually emerged. When the King got too uppity, Charles I got beheaded.

Now this series was produced in a communist state, you know. In other words, if you want to be a great nation, so, if the leader goes against the people's interests, you may have to behead him! They also said that because there was growing confidence between the people and the leaders, the country grew.

It is in fact a lesson to support their gradual opening up and their idea of how they can do it without conflict -- the "peaceful rise". They have worked out this scheme, this theory, this doctrine to assure America and the world that they're going to play by the rules.
