= The Rise and Fall of the Great Powers =

1987 book by Paul Kennedy

The Rise and Fall of the Great Powers: Economic Change and Military Conflict from 1500 to 2000
- Author: Paul Kennedy
- Language: English
- Genre: Economics, history
- Publisher: Random House
- Publication date: 1987
- Publication place: United States
- Media type: Print (hardcover)
- Pages: 677
- ISBN: 0-394-54674-1
- OCLC: 15594794
- Dewey Decimal: 909.82 19
- LC Class: D210 .K46 1987

The Rise and Fall of the Great Powers: Economic Change and Military Conflict from 1500 to 2000, by Paul Kennedy, first published in 1987, explores the politics and economics of the Great Powers from 1500 to 1980 and the reason for their decline. It then continues by forecasting the positions of China, Japan, the European Economic Community (EEC), the Soviet Union and the United States through the end of the 20th century.

== Summary ==
Kennedy argues that the strength of a Great Power can be properly measured only relative to other powers, and he provides a straightforward thesis: Great Power ascendancy (over the long term or in specific conflicts) correlates strongly to available resources and economic durability; military overstretch and a concomitant relative decline are the consistent threats facing powers whose ambitions and security requirements are greater than their resource base can provide for.

Throughout the book he reiterates his early statement (page 71): "Military and naval endeavors may not always have been the raison d'être of the new nations-states, but it certainly was their most expensive and pressing activity", and it remains such until the power's decline. He concludes that declining countries can experience greater difficulties in balancing their preferences for guns, butter and investments.

Kennedy states his theory in the second paragraph of the introduction as follows:

The "military conflict" referred to in the book's subtitle is therefore always examined in the context of "economic change". The triumph of any one Great Power in this period, or the collapse of another, has usually been the consequence of lengthy fighting by its armed forces; but it has also been the consequences of the more or less efficient utilization of the state's productive economic resources in wartime, and, further in the background, of the way in which that state's economy had been rising or falling, relative to the other leading nations, in the decades preceding the actual conflict. For that reason, how a Great Power's position steadily alters in peacetime, is as important to this study as how it fights in wartime.

Kennedy adds on the same page:

The relative strengths of the leading nations in world affairs never remain constant, principally because of the uneven rate of growth among different societies and of the technological and organizational breakthroughs which bring a greater advantage to one society than to another.

=== Early modern era ===
The book starts at the dividing line between the Renaissance and early modern history—1500 (chapter 1). It briefly discusses the Ming (page 4) and Muslim worlds (page 9) of the time and the rise of the western powers relative to them (page 16). The book then proceeds chronologically, looking at each of the power shifts over time and the effect on other Great Powers and the "Middle Powers".

Kennedy uses a number of measures to indicate real, relative and potential strength of nations throughout the book. He changes the metric of power based on the point in time. Chapter 2, "The Habsburg Bid for Mastery, 1519–1659" emphasizes the role of the "manpower revolution" in changing the way Europeans fought wars (see military revolution). This chapter also emphasizes the importance of Europe's political boundaries in shaping a political balance of power.

The argument in this chapter is not, therefore, that the Habsburgs failed utterly to do what other powers achieved so brilliantly. There are no stunning contrasts in evidence here; success and failure are to be measured by very narrow differences. All states, even the United Provinces, were placed under severe strain by the constant drain of resources for military and naval campaigns... The victory of the anti-Habsburg forces was, then, a marginal and relative one. They had managed, but only just, to maintain the balance between their material base and their military power better than their Habsburg opponents. (page 72)

=== European imperialism ===
The Habsburg failure segues into the thesis of chapter 3, that financial power reigned between 1660 and 1815, using Britain, France, Prussia, Austria-Hungary, and Russia to contrast between powers that could finance their wars (Britain and France) and powers that needed financial patronage to mobilize and maintain a major military force on the field. Kennedy presents a table (page 81, table 2) of "British Wartime Expenditures and Revenue"; between 1688 and 1815 is especially illustrative, showing that Britain was able to maintain loans at around one-third of British wartime expenditures throughout that period

- Total wartime expenditures, 1688–1815: £2,293,483,437
- Total income: £1,622,924,377
- Balance raised by loans: £670,559,060
- Loans as per cent of expenditure: 33.3%

The chapter also argues that British financial strength was the single most decisive factor in its victories over France during the 18th century. This chapter ends on the Napoleonic Wars and the fusion of British financial strength with a newfound industrial strength.

=== Industrial Revolution ===
Kennedy's next two chapters depend greatly upon Bairoch's calculations of industrialization, measuring all nations by an index, where 100 is the British per capita industrialization rate in 1900. The United Kingdom grows from 10 in 1750, to 16 in 1800, 25 in 1830, 64 in 1860, 87 in 1880, to 100 in 1900 (page 149). In contrast, France's per capita industrialization was 9 in 1750, 9 in 1800, 12 in 1830, 20 in 1860, 28 in 1880, and 39 in 1900. Relative shares of world manufacturing output (also first appearing on page 149) are used to estimate the peaks and troughs of power for major states. China, for example, begins with 32.8% of global manufacturing in 1750 and plummets after the First Opium War, Second Opium War and Taiping Rebellion to 19.7% of global manufacturing in 1860, and 12.5% in 1880 (compared to the UK's 1.9% in 1750, growing to 19.9% in 1860, and 22.9% in 1880).

=== 20th century ===
Measures of strength in the 20th century (pages 199–203) use population size, urbanization rates, Bairoch's per capita levels of industrialization, iron and steel production, energy consumption (measured in millions of metric tons of coal equivalent), and total industrial output of the powers (measured against Britain's 1900 figure of 100), to gauge the strength of the various great powers.

Kennedy also emphasizes productivity increase, based on systematic interventions, which led to economic growth and prosperity for great powers in the 20th century.

He compares the great powers at the close of the 20th century. Kennedy predicts the decline of the United States and the Soviet Union. Kennedy predicts the rise of Japan and struggles and potential for the European Economic Community (EEC). Kennedy predicts the rise of China, stating that if kept up, its economic development would change the country in decades and it would become a great power. He highlights the precedent of the Four Modernizations in Deng Xiaoping's plans for China—agriculture, industry, science and military—de-emphasizing military, while the United States and Soviet Union are emphasizing it. He predicts that continued deficit spending, especially on military build-up, will be the single most important reason for decline of any great power.

=== The United States ===
From the Civil War to the first half of the 20th century, the United States' economy benefited from high agricultural production, plentiful raw materials, technological advancements and financial inflows. During this time the U.S. did not have to contend with foreign dangers. From 1860 to 1914, U.S. exports increased sevenfold, resulting in huge trade surpluses. By 1945 the U.S. both enjoyed high productivity and was the only major industrialized nation intact after World War II. From the 1960s onward, the U.S. saw a relative decline in its share of world production and trade. By the 1980s, the U.S. experienced declining exports of agricultural and manufactured goods. In the space of a few years, the U.S. went from being the largest creditor to the largest debtor nation. At the same time, the federal debt was growing at an increasing pace. This situation is typical of declining hegemons.

The United States has the typical problems of a great power, which include balancing guns and butter and investments for economic growth. The U.S.' growing military commitment to every continent (other than Antarctica) and the growing cost of military hardware severely limit available options. Kennedy compares the U.S.' situation to Great Britain's prior to World War I. He comments that the map of U.S. bases is similar to Great Britain's before World War I.

As military expenses grow, this reduces investments in economic growth, which eventually "leads to the downward spiral of slower growth, heavier taxes, deepening domestic splits over spending priorities, and weakening capacity to bear the burdens of defense". Kennedy's advice is as follows:

The task facing American statesmen over the next decades, therefore, is to recognize that broad trends are under way, and that there is a need to "manage" affairs so that the relative erosion of the United States' position takes place slowly and smoothly, and is not accelerated by policies which bring merely short-term advantage but longer-term disadvantage.

=== Upward Spiral ===
Upward Spiral is a term used by Paul Kennedy in his book The Rise and Fall of Great Powers to describe the continually rising cost of military equipment relative to civilian manufactured goods. According to Kennedy there is an upward spiral at work in "all areas" of military production which is "becoming increasingly divergent from the commercial". The desire for state-of-the-art weaponry is meant to be pushing up the cost.

Writing in the late 1980s he said it was reasonable to assume that the next few decades would witness "the spiralling cost of the arms race, which is fuelled by the sheer expensiveness of newer weapons systems as well as by international rivalries." Quoting the comment of Peter Mathias that "One of the few constancies in history... is that the scale of commitment on military spending has always risen" Kennedy argues that this has become more important with time. According to Kennedy, "if that was true for the wars and arms races of the eighteenth century, when weapons technology changed only slowly, it is much truer of the present century [20th], when each new generation of aircraft, warships and tanks is vastly more expensive than preceding ones, even when allowance is made for inflation." Kennedy uses several examples. While a pre-1914 battleship cost the British Admiralty 2.5 million pounds ( Taking inflation into account this would be approximately 56 million pounds in 1980 terms), by the 1980s 120 million pounds was needed to buy a replacement frigate. Another is that of the American B-2 Spirit Stealth bomber whose cost rose into the 1990s.

== Table of contents ==
- Strategy and Economics in the Preindustrial World
  - The Rise of the Western World
  - The Habsburg Bid for Mastery, 1519–1659
  - Finance, Geography, and the Winning of Wars, 1660–1815
- Strategy and Economics in the Industrial Era
  - Industrialization and the Shifting Global Balances, 1815–1885
  - The Coming of a Bipolar World and the Crisis of the "Middle Powers": Part One, 1885–1918
  - The Coming of a Bipolar World and the Crisis of the "Middle Powers": Part Two, 1919–1942
- Strategy and Economics Today and Tomorrow
  - Stability and Change in a Bipolar World, 1943–1980
  - To the Twenty-first Century

=== Maps, tables and charts ===
The book has twelve maps, forty-nine tables and three charts to assist the reader in understanding the text.

== Publication data ==
The Rise and Fall of the Great Powers is the eighth and best-known book by historian Paul Kennedy. It reached number six on the list of best-selling hardcover books for 1988. In 1988 the author was awarded the Wolfson History Prize for this work.

Republished: January 1989, Paperback, ISBN 0-679-72019-7, 704 pages

== See also ==
- Great power
- The Rise of the Great Powers
- Upward Spiral
- List of regions by past GDP (PPP) per capita
- Economic history of the United States
- Empire
- Historic recurrence
- Ideocracy
- State collapse
