= Ye Xiaogang =

Chinese composer (born 1955)

Ye Xiaogang (simplified Chinese: 叶小纲; traditional Chinese: 葉小綱; pinyin: Yè Xiǎogāng; born September 23, 1955) is a Chinese composer of contemporary classical music.

== Biography ==
Ye was born in Shanghai in 1955. He studied at the Central Conservatory of Music in Beijing from 1978 to 1983, under the composer Du Mingxin. He then studied at the Eastman School of Music beginning in 1987. His teachers include Alexander Goehr.

He teaches at the Central Conservatory of Music, where he serves as Assistant President and vice dean of the composition department.

His Starry Sky was premiered at the opening ceremony of the 2008 Summer Olympics in Beijing. In the summer of 2006, Ye took part in the inaugural "Composer Alive!" transpacific correspondence project with Accessible Contemporary Music in Chicago, Illinois. This project consisted of Ye composing a piece, Datura, and sending its fragments as they were completed to Chicago, electronically. They were subsequently read by ACM's performance ensemble and posted to the Internet for Ye's approval. The project culminated with Ye traveling to the United States for the completed work's premiere performance.

Ye was awarded Fellowship of the Royal Northern College of Music in Manchester in December 2025.

== Selected compositions ==
The Great Wall Symphony (2002) consists of nine movements, with vocal parts and traditional Chinese musical instruments and folk tunes are used in it. Ye composed the soundtrack to the documentary Rise of the Great Powers.

=== Vocal ===
- Twilight in Tibet for tenor, horn and orchestra, op. 41 (2002)
- The Song of the Earth for soprano, baritone and orchestra, op. 47
- Poems of Lingnan for tenor, op. 62 (2011)
- Seven Episodes for Lin'an for soprano, tenor, bariton and orchestra, op. 63 (2011)
- The Road to the Republic (Cantate) (2011)
- The song of sorrow and gratification for Bassbariton and orchestra, op. 67 (2012)

=== Orchestral ===
- Winter for orchestra, op. 28 (1988)
- Cantonese Suite for orchestra, op. 51 (2005)
- Sichuan Image op. 70
- Tinjin Suite for orchestra, op. 75 (2015–2016)

==== Symphonies ====
- Symphony No.2 "Horizon" for soprano, baritone and orchestra, op. 20 (1984/85)
- Great Wall Symphony (2002)
- Symphony No.3 "Chu" op. 46 (2004/207)
- Symphony No.4 "Songs from the Steppe"
- Symphony No.5 "Lu Xun"
- Symphony No.7 "The Heroes"

=== Concertos ===
- The brilliance of Western Liang for violin and orchestra, op. 16 (1983)
- The Last Paradise for violin and orchestra, op. 24 (1993)
- Concerto of Life for piano and orchestra, op. 23c (2000)
- Pipa Concerto op. 31 (2001)
- Scent of Green Mango for piano and orchestra, op.42 (1998–2014)
- December chrysanthemum for flute and orchestra, op. 52b
- Starry sky for piano and orchestra, op. 56 (2008)
- Lamura Cuo for violin and orchestra, op.69b (2014)
- Mount E'mei for violin and orchestra, op.64 (2015–2016)

=== Chamber music ===
- Springs in the Forest for zheng, op. 6
- Poem of China for cello and piano, op. 15 (1981)
- San Die for zheng and flute op. 7a (1986)
- Enchanted Bamboo for piano, violin (2), viola and cello, op. 18
- Hibiscus for 6 players op. 48
- December Chrysanthemum for flute and piano, op. 52
- Namucuo for piano, op. 53
- Datura for flute, violin, cello and piano, op. 57
- Colorful Sutra Banner trio for piano, violin and cello, op. 58
- Piano Trio op. 59
- Basong Cuo op. 65 for zheng and 5 players, op.65 (2012)
- Gardenia for pipa and string quartet, op. 78 (2017)

=== Other ===
- Therenody
- Tripdus
- Ballade op. 25
- Shenzhen Story
- Macau Bride (Ballet-Suite) op. 34 (2001)
- Dalai VI
- Nine Horses
- The Rise of the Great Powers (2006)
- The Silence of Mount Minshan for strings, op. 73 (2015)

== Recordings ==
- Symphony Nr.2 "Horizon"— Wergo WER6646-2 (2004)
- The Macau Bride op.34 (Ballett-Suite) — Naxos 8.573131 (2014)
- Symphony Nr.3 "Chu"— BIS records BIS-2083 (2016)
- December Chrysanthemum (Chamber Music) — Delos DE3559 (2020)
- Winter— BIS records BIS-2113 (2021)
- Violin Concerto op.64 "Mount E'mei" — Naxos 8.579087 (2021)
- Mahler & Ye: The Song Of The Earth — Deutsche Grammophon (2021)
- The Road to the Republic (Cantate) — Naxos 8.579089 (2021)
- 7 Episodes for Lin'an op.63 — Naxos 8.579088 (2022)
- Sichuan Image op.70— BIS records BIS-2303 (2022)
