= Contemporary underground music in Syria =

Contemporary underground Music in Syria refers to a genre of music that originated and evolved outside the commercial mainstream, especially during the Syrian civil war, which began in 2011 and resulted in the restrictive environment and censorship of creative expression.

== History ==
The roots of underground music in Syria can be traced back to the late 1990s and early 2000s, when young musicians began exploring new forms of expression beyond the confines of traditional Arabic music. However, the movement truly gained momentum in the aftermath of the 2011 uprising and subsequent civil war. This period was characterized by increased political repression, societal unrest, and human rights abuses, which pushed musicians and artists to the margins of society, prompting them to create and disseminate their work underground.

== Features ==
Underground music in Syria encompasses a broad range of musical styles, from alternative rock and hip hop to electronic and experimental music. Lyrics often reflect personal experiences, societal issues, and political sentiments. A common characteristic of Syrian underground music is the emphasis on resistance, resilience, and the human capacity to create in the face of adversity. Despite limited resources, musicians often make do with homemade instruments and improvised recording studios.

== Notable Artists and Bands ==
Omar Souleyman — initially a local wedding singer, who later created a fusion of traditional dabke music and electronic synths.

Refugees Of Rap — founded by brothers Yaser and Mohamed Jamous in Syria, their music focuses on the struggle and life experiences of the Syrian people.

== See also ==
- Music of Syria
- Syrian Civil War
- Music and Politics
