= Syriac chant =

One of the oldest Christian chants

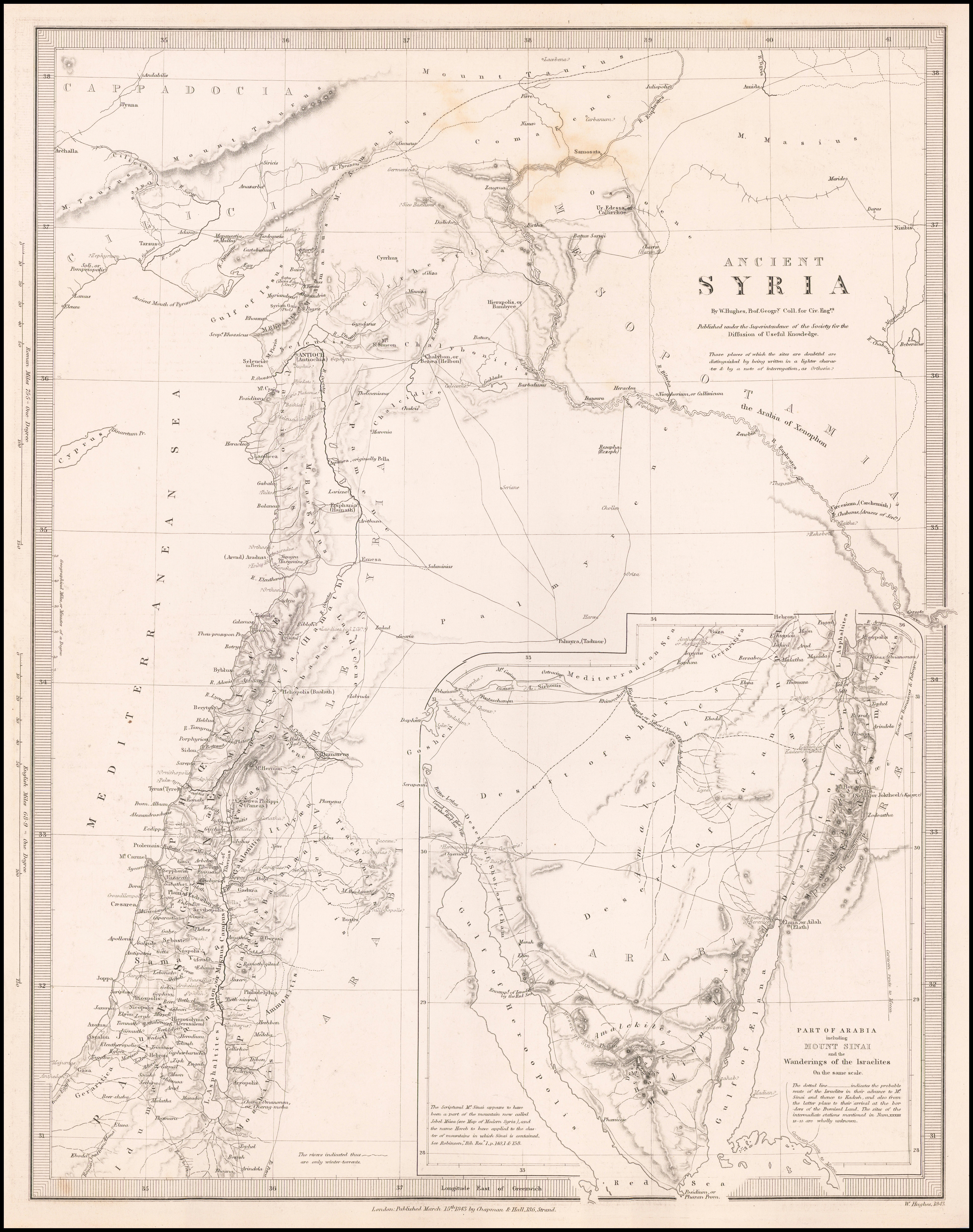

Syrian chant is one of the oldest Christian chants in the world. Due to the lack of information concerning early musical manuscripts, it is conjectural to what extent the modern repertoire reflects the early traditions. What we know of the sound in Syrian chant is mainly derived from modern performances. Modern performances have a sparse texture and are highly ornamented. The setting within which Syriac chant takes place is also only understood through the modern performances of Syriac chant. The chant seems to be designed to resonate throughout the building it is performed in. This suggests that the setting was always a church building or a room that reflected the sound of the walls and ceilings. There is some difficulty in studying Syrian chant due to the geopolitical conflict throughout Syrian Christian history. Many of the conflicts have resulted in persecution of Syrian Christians which may account for the oral tradition of Syriac chant. The history of Syriac chant is derived from diaspora and persecution.

== Historical setting of Christian chant ==
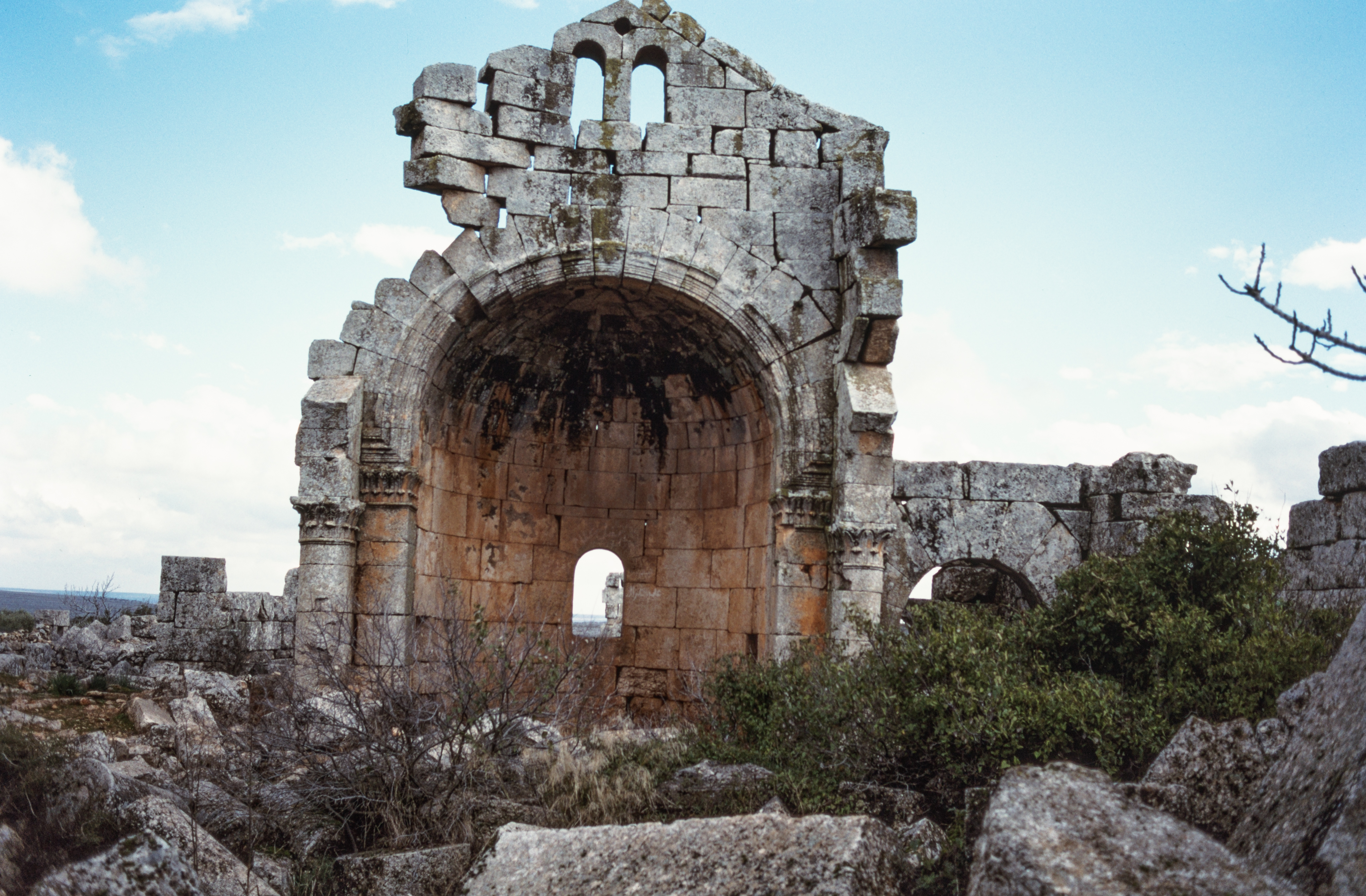
Ruins of an old Church.

Historically, Syria has had a long attachment to Christian chant. Due to geographical locations, modern day Syria was one of the first areas to be exposed to Christendom brought by the early disciples of Christianity from Jerusalem. Syrian chants have been spread throughout regions of the world by Syrian immigration. This diaspora has brought many of the Syrian liturgical traditions to both neighboring and distant countries. The movement of a people, forced or unforced, establishes a desire to bring their culture with them. The Christian chants of Syria have remained thus far as oral traditions and have been passed down through the generations, who have kept loyally to their faith and culture. Ethnomusicologist Dorchak discusses the use of culture as a means to strengthen and resist culture loss when threatened. A culture attacked and marginalized throughout its history will rely greatly on its cultural values/ principles. This oral transmission of religious chants present in Syrian culture is signet of a culture strengthened by marginalization and diaspora. The cause for the majority of Syrian diaspora is due to geopolitical and religious conflicts. Syria has been a place of conflict due to its rich resources and geographical placement bridging Europe to North Africa as well as the many different religious beliefs present within the Middle East.

Since the introduction of Christianity and the first Syrian chants, Syrian culture has been confronted by such empires as

- the Roman Empire prior to the conversion of Constantine;
- the Persian Empire's conquest in 611;
- the Islamic conquests led by Mohamad prior to his death in 632, A.D.;
- the Shi'ites and the religious persecution of rural regions of Syria, home to previous Islamic conquest; the conflicts of the crusades and the Islamic forces of the Middle East.
- The main expulsion of Syrian Christians was during the Ottoman rule in the Levant and the massacres that took place in Damascus.

These historical events provide sufficient context to why Christian Syrian chant may have remained an oral culture and is lacking in historical or archeological sources. There may have been a musical notation system invented for Syrian chant but is no longer known of as it lost through the many conquests Syria has faced. The most recent diaspora has led to Syrian refugee camps throughout the Middle East and the destruction of Syrian cities and villages, along with architecture and culture.

== Syrian Christian chant ==
There are historically six schools of chant, which have branched out due to the chants being passed on through oral transmission. Syrian chant is esteemed above all other types of song in the Syrian church. It is the greatest form of prayer and the most representative feature of the Syrian Orthodox church. Chant is integral to the Syrian church and has been a practice that has created a distinction in the Syrian practice of worship to that of its neighboring Christian orders.

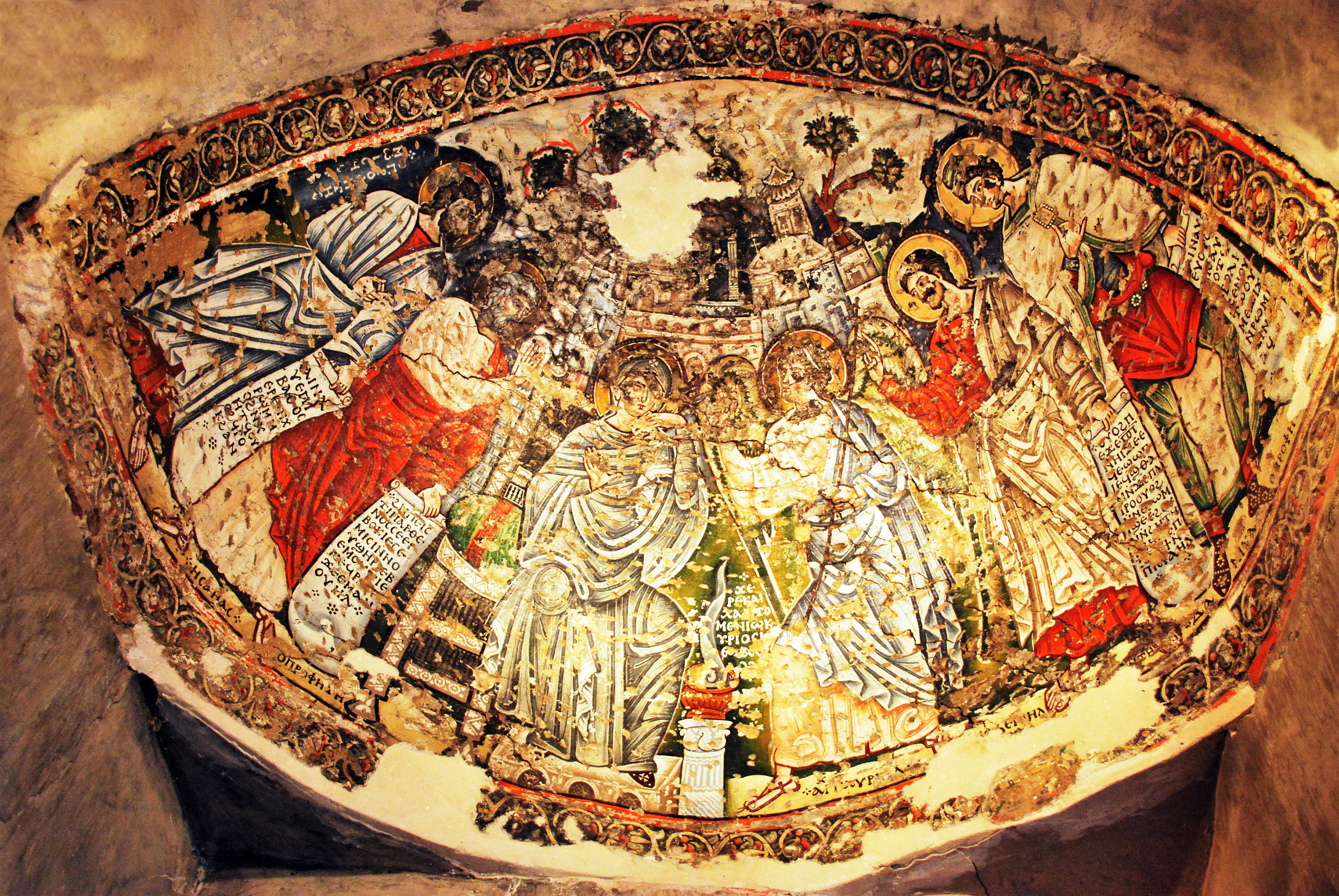
Ceiling art that would assist in drawing an emotional and spiritual communion; while also assisting in the musicality through bouncing the chant; and further assisting the knowledge of the chants through the depictions of Heaven.

Ethnomusicologist Tala Jarjour explains that there are only a few sources on early Syrian chant and one must analyze its current form and reflect upon it in historical contexts. In Jarjour's book, Sense and Sadness; Syriac Chant in Allepo, she mentions that the Arabic word for Syrian chant is Hasho. "Hasho is best thought of as a construct that exists at the intersection of emotionality, spirituality, musicality and knowledge". Jarjour also explains that the earliest known source of Syrian chant is from the Napoleonic conquest to Egypt. Villoteau was one of Napoleon's scholar's, who accompanied the conquest into Egypt and made notes of the Syriac chant he encountered. Villoteau wrote down details about the chant in which he mentions that the Syrian nation chose to sing songs that expressed the identity of its people.

== Sound of Christian chant ==
Through modern renditions found on YouTube we can get a general understanding of how Syrian chant would have sounded. The chant usually begins with a highly ornamented and free rhythm pattern. There appear to be multiple voices singing and taking turns. Each singer sings solo for their section of the chant. Jarjour explained earlier that Hasho, Syrian chant, is a coming together of emotionality, spirituality, musicality and knowledge. Music examples on YouTube are often a monophonic texture filled with melodic ornamentation. The ornamentation notes draw emotion, while the content is no doubt prayer and is spiritually rooted. The catechesis of the prayer provides knowledge. These are inline with what we are to understand about Syrian chant. The other features of the songs is how it resonates through the building it is recorded in. The texture of the songs are usually thin but due to the acoustics in the buildings they are sung in, the sound becomes more dense with the echoes and sound-waves bouncing off the walls and ceilings. Many of the Syrian chant videos also use scales and intervals that resemble the western diminished or diminished 7th intervals. There is some harmonization but each voice tends to follow the same melodic contour. The chants will occasionally sound like rounds. The timbre is usually dark and the range of pitch is wide. It is important though to understand that these observations are made from modern chants found on YouTube. The observations may not reflect the historical chants.

== The Context of Christian chant ==
The chant seems to be designed to accommodate the acoustics of the building. This reflects an interesting feature of the chant as it was likely sung to bounce of the walls and ceiling of the church. Whether this is a technological advancement of the architecture to be designed to bounce the sound or the singing was sung the way it was to accommodate the acoustics, the sounds and prayers to carry throughout the buildings of the Middle East. The chants were reached by all present. These elements are no doubt intertwined in a particular way that give Syrian chant its distinctive qualities. The earliest information that Villoteau gathered was all derived from a priest that he encountered in Syria. Although Villoteau attempted to transcribe some of the chants, they used the Arabic quartertone's making the chant near-impossible to transcribe.

=== Difficulty in studying Syrian Christian chant ===
Syrian chant has been misrepresented in academics as well as misunderstood culturally due to wrongful association with other cultural chants. Although the Syriac beliefs are in union with the Catholic Church, Syrian chant is designed for a specific style of celebration that other forms of Catholicism do not use. Although it is from the Levant, it cannot be associated or counted synonymous with Islamic chant, which is dominant in the East. It has traits that suggest a derivative of the Arabic musical system but it does not have associations with any maqamat (plural of maqam used in Arabic music). It is understood as a model musical system yet it does not have any existing music theory.

Due to the orality of its tradition and the minimal writing on the chant, little is known about its early years. Syriac Christians have been marginalized throughout their existence in the Middle East which may account for the missing information. The first known source to write about Syrian chant was Villoteau, who wrote down details about the chant. The information that Villoteau gathered was all derived from a priest that he encountered in Syria. Although Villoteau attempted to transcribe some of the chants, they used the Arabic quartertone's. This proved difficult to interpret as the Syrian Christians only used oral language to pass on the chants which meant the music was not scripted or theorized. This is possibly due to the persecution Syrian Christians and how they have thus relied predominantly on oral language to pass on the chants which meant the music was either destroyed or was never transcribed from oral to notation.

== Early Church ==
In the early church, the music consisted of hymns and antiphonal psalmody. The earliest extant work is the Gnostic Psalter of the 2nd century, a collection of Psalm texts in hymn form reflecting a Gnostic theology. The first orthodox work are the hymns of Ephrem the Syrian (306–373), some of which are still used today. Both hymns and antiphonal psalmody were brought by St. Ambrose to Milan and are apparently the basis for Ambrosian chant.

Modern Syrian chant is much more rhythmic and syllabic than Gregorian chant.

== Diaspora ==
Syriac Chants from South India.

The Christian liturgy that developed in Syriac as the Christian Aramaic came to be known in the early Christian era flourished in South India among Saint Thomas Christians. Early Christian chants by such saintly poets as St. Ephrem the Syrian became part of the Christian experience in this part of the world.

== See also ==
- Beth Gazo
- Syriac sacral music
