= Al-Turath Ensemble =

Syrian musical ensemble

The Al Turath Ensemble (فــرقــة الــتـراث) is a Syrian classical Arabic musical ensemble founded in 1954 by Sabri Mudallah. Leadership passed to Mohammed Hammadye (مــحــمــد حــمـّـــادي) in 1985 who added instrumentalists to what had previously been only a vocal ensemble. The term al turath means "heritage." Their repertoire centres on muwashshahs of Aleppo.

Their discography includes:

- Jardines de Jazmín - Gardens of Jasmine 2001. Wasla sikah "Hozam." Al Turath Ensemble: Mohammed Hammadye (leader); Ali Anjirini, Dya A Kabbani, Ahmad Shokri, Malek Zayat (vocals); Abdul Rahim Ajim (ud); Imad Molki (qanun); Tofik Al Ramadan (nay); Abdul Rahman Miri (darbuka); Salah ddin Dabbagh (riqq).
- Hermana de la Luna - Sister of the Moon Wasla rast. 2001
- The Music of Spanish al-Andalus. Almaviva DS-0123.
