= MAQAM =

US-based production company

- Company type: Private
- Industry: Media
- Genre: Arab World
- Founded: 1999
- Founder: Bashar B. Barazi
- Headquarters: Chicago, United States
- Number of locations: Chicago, Los Angeles, Las Vegas, and Tokyo
- Parent: 3B Media, Inc.

MAQAM is a US-based production company specializing in Arabic and Middle Eastern media. The company was established by a small group of Arabic music and culture lovers, later becoming a division of 3B Media Inc. "MAQAM" is an Arabic word meaning a position of high esteem. It also refers to a musical mode in Arabic music that is based on the quarter-tone scale (Arabic maqam).

The company's consumer retail web site is considered to be "The World's biggest on-line source for Arabic Music". In 2007 the company launched the first legal Arabic music digital service, MAQAM MP3, and the first online Arabic music radio/streaming service. The company produces the nationally syndicated radio program Radio MAQAM, which is broadcast weekly on public radio, and is hosted by Bashar Barazi. The show is the first ever Arabic hour on public radio. In 2015, the radio program moved to a two-hour format on some stations, along with several re-runs during the week on others.

MAQAM states that as an organization it has "a mission to preserve and promote Arabic and Middle Eastern culture around the world". In 2001 the company co-produced a commemorative album for Iraqi oud player Munir Bashir entitled Mesopotamia. This was followed by another oud album for Iraqi Oud prodigy Asim Al Chalabi entitled Monajat.

In 2005, the company premiered the first Broadway-style theatrical production of Arabic and Middle Eastern dance and music in Tokyo, Japan called A Dream of Arabia. This was followed by a series of shows in Asia and then the US premier in Chicago on June 12, 2008. The show received wide coverage in the media, and was critically praised as a groundbreaking show and described as "..a majestic fusion of dance and theatre".

MAQAM has also been credited with bringing Arabic culture to the Western mainstream. The company frequently collaborates with top Arab artists from the "golden age" such as Fairuz, Warda Al-Jazairia and sponsors their official web sites. MAQAM is the only Arabic media member of the International Federation of the Phonographic Industry. MAQAM's music label has a policy of only accepting artists on an exclusive basis and their roster includes acts such as Egyptian Academy, famed Egyptian percussionist Gamal Gomma, Nourhan Sharif, Nanae, Yousry Sharif, Mary Ellen Donald, Mimi Spencer, and the Oriental-Jazz group Hijazz.

Media accounts have reported that the company frequently sponsors charitable causes including benefits for Médecins Sans Frontières (Doctors without Borders), food drives, Benefit for Gaza.

In response to the events of the Arab Spring which began in 2010, on January 28, 2011, MAQAM provided a dedicated website and turned their official Facebook and Twitter pages into live feeds, reporting all calls, emails, tweets, photos, video, and news from Egypt, giving Egyptians under the internet blockade access to their global audience during the Egyptian Revolution of 2011. During that time it was reported the production staff suspended all productions and mobilized their fan and audience base under the banner "freedom@MAQAM", continuously broadcasting dial up access numbers, direct IP addresses for blocked web sites, local emergency phone numbers, blood donation information and sites throughout Egypt, and recorded phone calls from citizens in Egypt. MAQAM continued to report on the Arab Spring in Tunisia (Tunisian revolution), Egypt, Bahrain, Libyan Civil War, Yemen, Algeria, Morocco, Syrian civil war, Jordan, Oman, Saudi Arabia, and across the Middle East and North Africa. Their reporting is noted for being uncensored, unedited, and a direct broadcast of the protests allowing viewers around the world to experience the revolutions as they happen. This brought some criticism as well as complaints on Facebook and Twitter due to the graphic and uncensored nature of some of the posts. This involvement resulted in their web sites coming under brutal malicious attacks in summer of 2011 in response to their coverage and reporting on the revolutions.

On November 2, 2012 the company produced a new show entitled Arabian Journey that so far has only been available in Asia. Also, as of 2015, the reference to a Madrid office on their web site was quietly removed without an announcement and replaced with a Las Vegas one.
