= List of Sahitya Akademi Translation Prize winners for Marathi =

List of winners of a literary honor in India

Part of a series on

Sahitya Akademi Awards
Category
Sahitya Akademi Award winners by language
- Assamese
- Bengali
- Bodo
- Dogri
- English
- Gujarati
- Hindi
- Kannada
- Kashmiri
- Konkani
- Maithili
- Malayalam
- Marathi
- Meitei (Manipuri)
- Nepali
- Odia
- Punjabi
- Rajasthani
- Sanskrit
- Santali
- Sindhi
- Tamil
- Telugu
- Urdu
Sahitya Akademi Translation Prizes
- Assamese
- Bengali
- Bodo
- Dogri
- English
- Gujarati
- Hindi
- Kannada
- Kashmiri
- Konkani
- Maithili
- Malayalam
- Marathi
- Meitei (Manipuri)
- Nepali
- Odia
- Punjabi
- Rajasthani
- Sanskrit
- Santali
- Sindhi
- Tamil
- Telugu
- Urdu
Sahitya Akademi Yuva Puraskar
- Assamese
- Bengali
- Bodo
- Dogri
- English
- Gujarati
- Hindi
- Kannada
- Kashmiri
- Konkani
- Maithili
- Malayalam
- Meitei (Manipuri)
- Marathi
- Nepali
- Odia
- Punjabi
- Rajasthani
- Sanskrit
- Santali
- Sindhi
- Tamil
- Telugu
- Urdu
Sahitya Akademi Bal Sahitya Puraskar
- Assamese
- Bengali
- Bodo
- Dogri
- English
- Gujarati
- Hindi
- Kannada
- Kashmiri
- Konkani
- Maithili
- Malayalam
- Meitei (Manipuri)
- Marathi
- Nepali
- Odia
- Punjabi
- Rajasthani
- Sanskrit
- Santali
- Sindhi
- Tamil
- Telugu
- Urdu
Related
- Eighth Schedule to the Constitution of India
- Official Languages Commission
- List of languages by number of native speakers in India

Sahitya Akademi Translation Prizes are given each year to writers for their outstanding translations work in the 24 languages, since 1989.

== Recipients ==
Following is the list of recipients of Sahitya Akademi translation prizes for their works written in Marathi. The award, as of 2019, consisted of ₹50,000.

Year	Translator	Title of the translation	Original Title	Original Language	Genre	Original Author	References
1989	Uma Virupax Kulkarni	Vamsavriksha	Vamshavriksha	Kannada	Novel	S. L. Bhyrappa	
1990	Shripad Joshi	Rag Darbari	Rag Darbari	Hindi	Novel	Shrilal Shukla	
1991	Chandrakant Patil	Tamas	Tamas	Hindi	Novel	Bhisham Sahni	
1992	Naresh Kavadi	Karmelin	Karmelin	Konkani	Novel	Damodar Mauzo	
1993	Vilas Gite	Rabindranathanchya Sahavasat	Mangupte Rabindra Nath	Bengali	Poetry	Maitreyi Devi	
1994	Usha T. Purohit	Saat Paaule Akashi	Sat Pagala Akashma	Gujarati	Novel	Kundanika Kapadia	
1995	Pradeep G. Deshpande	Adhunik Stotra	Latter-Day-Psalms	English	Poetry	Nissim Ezekiel	
1996	Vasant Keshav Patil	Dashadwar Te Sopan	Dashadwar Se Sopan Tak	Hindi	Autobiography	Harivansh Rai Bachchan	
1997	Chandrakant Bhonjal	Sakshidar	Pratyaksha Darshi	Hindi	Novel	Jitendra Bhatiya	
1998	Nishikant Thakar Sadaraa	Noukaraacha	Noukar ki Kamiz	Hindi	Novel	Vinod Kumar Shukla	
1999	Hema Javdeker Rukmani	Na Radha Na	Na Radha Na	Punjabi	Novel	Amrita Pritam	
2000	Dhanashri Halbe	Ausepchi Mule	Ouseppinte Makkal	Malayalam	Novel	Thakazhi Sivasankara Pillai	
2001	Bhaskar Laxman Bholay	Dr. Baba Saheb Ambedkar : Anubhav Ani Athavani	Reminiscencess and Remembrances of Dr. B.R. Ambedkar	English	Biography	Nanak Chand Rattu	
2002	Ibrahim Afgan	Hak	Diwaron Ke Beech	Urdu	Autobiography	Nida Fazli	
2003	Aparna Velankar	The God of Small Things	The God of Small Things	English	Novel	Arundhati Roy	
2004	Mrinalini Prabhakar Gadkari	Devdas	Deodas	Bengali	Novel	Sarat Chandra Chattopadhyay	
2005	Ashok Jain	Antahstha	The Insider	English	Novel (Roman à clef)	P. V. Narasimha Rao	
2006	Asawari Kakade	Bol Madhavi	Bolo Madhavi	Hindi	Poetry	Chandra Prakash Deval	
2007	Ranjana Parthak	Pahilee Jaag	Pratham Alo	Bengali	Novel	Sunil Gangopadhyay	
2008	Suryanarayan Ransubhe	Khota Satya	Jhoota Sach	Hindi	Novel	Yashpal	
2009	Jayprakash Sawant	Kalikatha Via Bypass	Kalikatha Via Bypass	Hindi	Novel	Alka Saraogi	
2010	Saroj Deshpande	Ashi Kalvel	A Matter Of Time	English	Novel	Shashi Deshpande	
2011	Kavita Mahajan	Rajai	Lihaaf	Urdu	Short Stories	Ismat Chughtai	
2012	Sharda Sathe	Panthastha : Eka Bhartiya Samyavadi Netyachi Mushaphiri	A Traveller And The Road	English	Biography	Mohit Sen	
2013	Francis D'Britto	Subodh Bible-Naya Karar	Bible: The New Testament	-	Religious text	-	
2014	M.S. Patil	Smrutibhranshanantar	After Amnesia	English	Literary Criticism	Ganesh Devy	
2015	No Award						
2016	Milind Champanerkar	Lokashahivadi Ammis: Dirghapatra	Ammi: Letter to a Democratic Mother	English	Novel	Saeed Akhtar Mirza	
2017	Sujata Deshmukh	Gauhar Jaan Mhanatat Mala	My Name Is Gauhar Jaan	English	Biography	Vikram Sampath	
2018	Prafull Shiledar	Sanshayatma	Sanshayatma	Hindi	Poetry	Dnyanendrapati	
2019	Sai Paranjpye	Aani Mag Ek Divas	And Then One Day	Bengali	Poetry	Naseeruddin Shah	
2020	Sonali Navangul	Madhyaratrinantarche Tas	Irandam Jaamanklin Kathai	Tamil	Novel	Salama	
2021	Kumar Nawathe	Sea of Poppies	Sea of Poppies	English	Novel	Amitav Ghosh	
2022	Pramod Mujumdar	Salokhayache Pradesh : Shodh Sahishnu Bhartacha	In Good Faith	English	Non fiction	Saba Naqvi	
2023	Abhay Sadavarte	Brahmos : Eka Adnyat Samshodhanayatrechi Yashogatha	Success Mantra of Brahmos	English	Non-Fiction	A. Sivathanu Pillai	

== See also ==
- List of Sahitya Akademi Award winners for Marathi
