= Tilted Axis Press =

Publishing house for contemporary Asian literature

- Status: Active
- Founded: 6 June 2015; 11 years ago
- Founder: Deborah Smith
- Country of origin: United Kingdom
- Distribution: NBN International
- Publication types: Books
- Nonfiction topics: Asian literature
- Official website: tiltedaxispress.com

Tilted Axis Press is a non-profit British publishing house specializing in the publication of contemporary Asian literature. Founded by Deborah Smith in 2015 following the success of her translation of Han Kang's The Vegetarian, the organization has gone on to publish 42 books and several chapbooks translated from 18 languages. Tilted Axis became known as the original translator and English language publisher of Tokyo Ueno Station by Miri Yu, which went on to receive critical acclaim as both a book and translation. Their profile rose higher in 2022, when Tomb of Sand, written by Geetanjali Shree and translated by Daisy Rockwell, won the International Booker Prize, marking the first novel written in Hindi to take the award.

== History ==
As of 2017, Tilted Axis Press made the largest share of their sales through traditional brick-and-mortar retail (35.1%), with the second largest channel being direct local and international sales through their website. Although the press has only received limited distribution outside of the United Kingdom, some books have been co-published internationally. For example, in 2018 The Lifted Brow, under their Brow Books imprint, co-published their translation of "The Impossible Fairytale" in Australia.

In 2021 Tilted Axis launched a crowdfunding campaign to support the translation and publication of several chapbooks covering feminist literature, raising over £5,000 in total. One of the collections in the series, Pa-Liwanag, received a positive review from CNN Philippines, who stated the book "proves that writings by farmers and peasants are overdue".

In July 2022, following Tilted Axis's victory at The Booker International Prize, Deborah Smith announced that she was stepping down as Publisher and Managing Director. At the same time, Kristen Vida Alfaro was announced as her successor in these roles.

The publisher has been noted for its choice in content, often "unconventional" with a focus on feminist and queer themes, and its focus on the translators themselves, who are prominently credited and given royalties from book sales. As of 2025 Tilted Axis has eight part time employees.

Tilted Axis expanded its distribution network to the United States in February 2025. Previously, it had licensed works to American publishers.

== Titles ==
Book index	Title	Author	Translator	Publication year
1	Panty	Sangeeta Bandyopadhyay	Arunava Sinha	2016
2	One Hundred Shadows	Hwang Jungeun	Jung Yewon	2016
3	Indigenous Species	Khairani Barokka		2016
4	The Sad Part Was	Prabda Yoon	Mui Poopoksakul	2017
5	The Impossible Fairytale	Han Yujoo	Janet Hong	2017
6	Abandon	Sangeeta Bandyopadhyay	Arunava Sinha	2017
7	The Devils’ Dance	Hamid Ismailov	Donald Rayfield	2018
8	Moving Parts	Prabda Yoon	Mui Poopoksakul	2018
9	I'll Go On	Hwang Jungeun	Emily Yae Won	2018
10	Tokyo Ueno Station	Yu Miri	Morgan Giles	2019
11	Sergius Seeks Bacchus	Norman Erikson Pasaribu	Tiffany Tsao	2019
12	The Yogini	Sangeeta Bandyopadhyay	Arunava Sinha	2019
13	Of Strangers and Bees	Hamid Ismailov	Shelley Fairweather-Vega	2019
14	Every Fire You Tend	Sema Kaygusuz	Nicholas Glastonbury	2019
	Killing Kanoko / Wild Grass on the Riverbank	Itō Hiromi	Jeffrey Angles	2020
15	Where the Wild Ladies Are	Matsuda Aoko	Polly Barton	2020
16	Arid Dreams	Duanwad Pimwana	Mui Poopoksakul	2020
17	No Presents Please	Jayant Kaikini	Tejaswini Niranjana	2020
18	Women Dreaming	Salma	Meena Kandasamy	2020
	Pa-Liwanag (Translating Feminisms)			2020
	Deviant Disciples (Translating Feminisms)			2020
19	Strange Beasts of China	Yan Ge	Jeremy Tiang	2020
20	Black Box	Shiori Ito	Allison Markin Powell	2021
21	Manaschi	Hamid Ismailov	Donald Rayfield	2021
22	Tomb of Sand	Geetanjali Shree	Daisy Rockwell	2021
23	Love in the Big City	Sang Young Park	Anton Hur	2021
24	Happy Stories, Mostly	Norman Erikson Pasaribu	Tiffany Tsao	2021
26	Chinatown	Thuận	Nguyễn An Lý	2022
25	Father May Be an Elephant and Mother a Small Basket, But...	Gogu Shyamala	Diia Rajan et al.	2021
27	Violent Phenomena: 21 Essays on Translation	Kavita Bhanot et al.		2022
29	So Distant From My Life	Monique Ilboudo	Yarri Kamara	2022
28	Unexpected Vanilla	Lee Hyemi	Soje	2022
30	No Edges	Swahili Authors (various)	Various Translators	2023
31	I Belong To Nowhere	Kalyani Thakur Charal	Sipra Mukherjee, Mrinmoy Pramanick	2023
32	The End of August	Yu Miri	Morgan Giles	2023
33	A Book, Untitled	Shushan Avagyan	Deanna Cachoian-Schanz	2023
34	dd’s Umbrella	Hwang Jungeun	e. yaewon	2024
35	Again I hear these waters		Shalim M. Hussain	2024
36	To Hell with Poets	Baqytgul Sarmekova	Mirgul Kali	2024
37	Elevator in Sài Gòn	Thuận	Nguyễn An Lý	2024
38	My Dream Job	Norman Erikson Pasaribu		2024
39	Delicious Hunger	Hai Fan	Jeremy Tiang	2024
40	On a Woman's Madness	Astrid Roemer	Lucy Scott	2024
40	Revathi: A Life in Trans Activism	A. Revathi	Nandini Murali	2024
41	Our City That Year	Geetanjali Shree	Daisy Rockwell	2025
42	Off-White	Astrid Roemer	Lucy Scott & David McKay	2025
