= Jaipur Literature Festival =

Annual literary festival in India

Jaipur Literature Festival The Jaipur Literature Festival (JLF)
- Genre: Literary festival
- Begins: January–February
- Frequency: Annual
- Locations: Jaipur, Rajasthan, India
- Years active: 20
- Inaugurated: 2006
- Participants: 500
- Attendance: 300,000
- Patron: Teamwork Arts
- Website: jaipurliteraturefestival.org

The Jaipur Literature Festival (JLF), often hailed as the "greatest literary show on Earth," is a renowned annual cultural and literary festival held in Jaipur, Rajasthan, India. Established in 2006 by writers Namita Gokhale and William Dalrymple, it has grown into one of the world’s largest and most prestigious literary gatherings, attracting authors, writers, scholars, artists, critics, thinkers, and readers from across the globe.

The Diggi Palace Hotel in Jaipur used to serve as the main venue of the festival, with sessions held in the Hall of Audience and throughout the gardens of the Diggi Palace in the city centre. From 2022, the festival is organised in the Hotel Clarks Amer in Jaipur.

The festival is organized by Teamwork Arts and the Jaipur Virasat Foundation, with events traditionally hosted at Diggi Palace, a heritage property in Jaipur. Since 2025, the venue shifted to Hotel Clarks Amer to accommodate its expanding scale. JLF is renowned for its democratic ethos, offering entry to all attendees and fostering intellectual dialogue on literature, art, poetry, music, religion, politics, environment, film, theatre, history, and culture.

In 2012, a number of events occurred related to the Salman Rushdie and the Satanic Verses controversy.

A number of events created by the organisers of JLF, loosely named JLF International, have taken place in other cities around the world.

== History, timeline ==
=== 2006 ===
The 2006 inaugural Jaipur Literature Festival featured 18 writers, including Hari Kunzru, William Dalrymple, Shobhaa De and Namita Gokhale and 14 others. It drew a crowd of about 100 attendees, some of whom "appeared to be tourists who had simply got lost", according to the event's co-director William Dalrymple.

=== 2007 ===
In 2007 the festival grew in size and featured Salman Rushdie, Kiran Desai, Suketu Mehta, Shashi Deshpande, and William Dalrymple.

=== 2008 ===
In 2008 the festival continued to expand with about 2,500 attendees and the following authors/speakers: Ian McEwan, Donna Tartt, John Berendt, Paul Zacharia, Indra Sinha, Uday Prakash, Christopher Hampton, Manil Suri, Miranda Seymour

=== 2009 ===
The 2009 festival had about 12,000 attendees and over 140 authors/speakers including Vikram Seth, Pico Iyer, Michael Ondaatje, Simon Schama, Tina Brown, Hanif Kureishi, Hari Kunzru, Pankaj Mishra, Tariq Ali, Ahmed Rashid, Patrick French, Mohsin Hamid, Mohammed Hanif, Wendy Doniger, Sunil Gangopadhyay, Tarun Tejpal, Sashi Tharoor, U R Ananthmurthy, Alka Saraogi, Anuragh Mathur, Ashok Vajpeyi, Ashis Nandy, Basharat Peer, Charles Nicholl, Christophe Jaffrelot, Colin Thubron, Daniyal Mueenuddin, Geetanjali Shree, Mukul Kesavan, Musharraf Ali Farooqui, G. T. Narayana Rao, Nikita Lalwani, Paul Zacharia, Pavan K Varma, Rana Dasgupta, S R Faruqui, Tash Aw, Udayan Vajpeyi, Farah Khan and Sonia Faleiro, with music provided by DJ Cheb i Sabbah, Nitin Sawney, Salman Ahmad (Junoon Unplugged), Shye Ben Tzur, Rajasthan Roots, Paban Das Baul and others in evening concerts over the five days. The special theme was the oral tradition, in India and elsewhere.

=== 2010 ===
The 2010 festival had about 30,000 attendees and 172 authors/speakers, including Geoff Dyer, Henry Louis Gates Jr., Jamaica Kincaid, Niall Ferguson, Vikram Chandra and Hemant Shesh.

=== 2011 ===
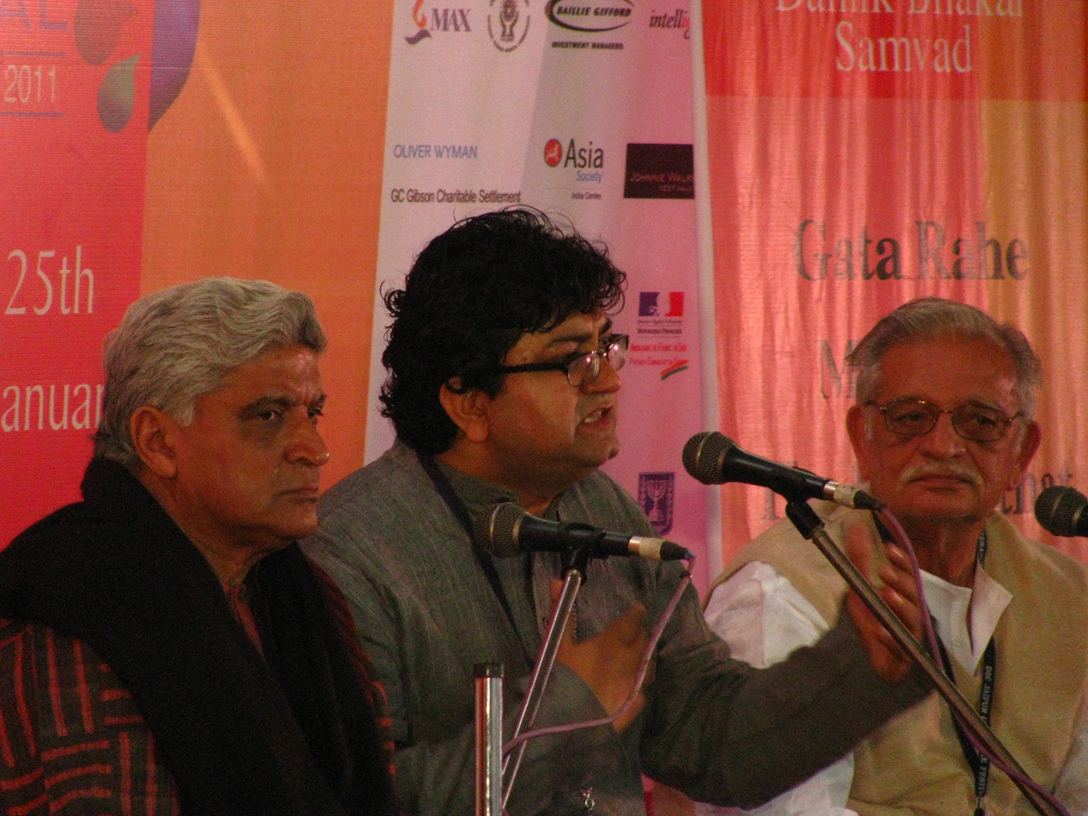
Gulzar, Javed Akhtar, and Prasoon Joshi at Jaipur Literature Festival 2011

The 2011 festival had 226 writers like Hemant Shesh, Prasoon Joshi, Javed Akhtar, Gulzar and Candace Bushnell, the speakers included Nobel-winners J. M. Coetzee and Orhan Pamuk.

=== 2012 ===
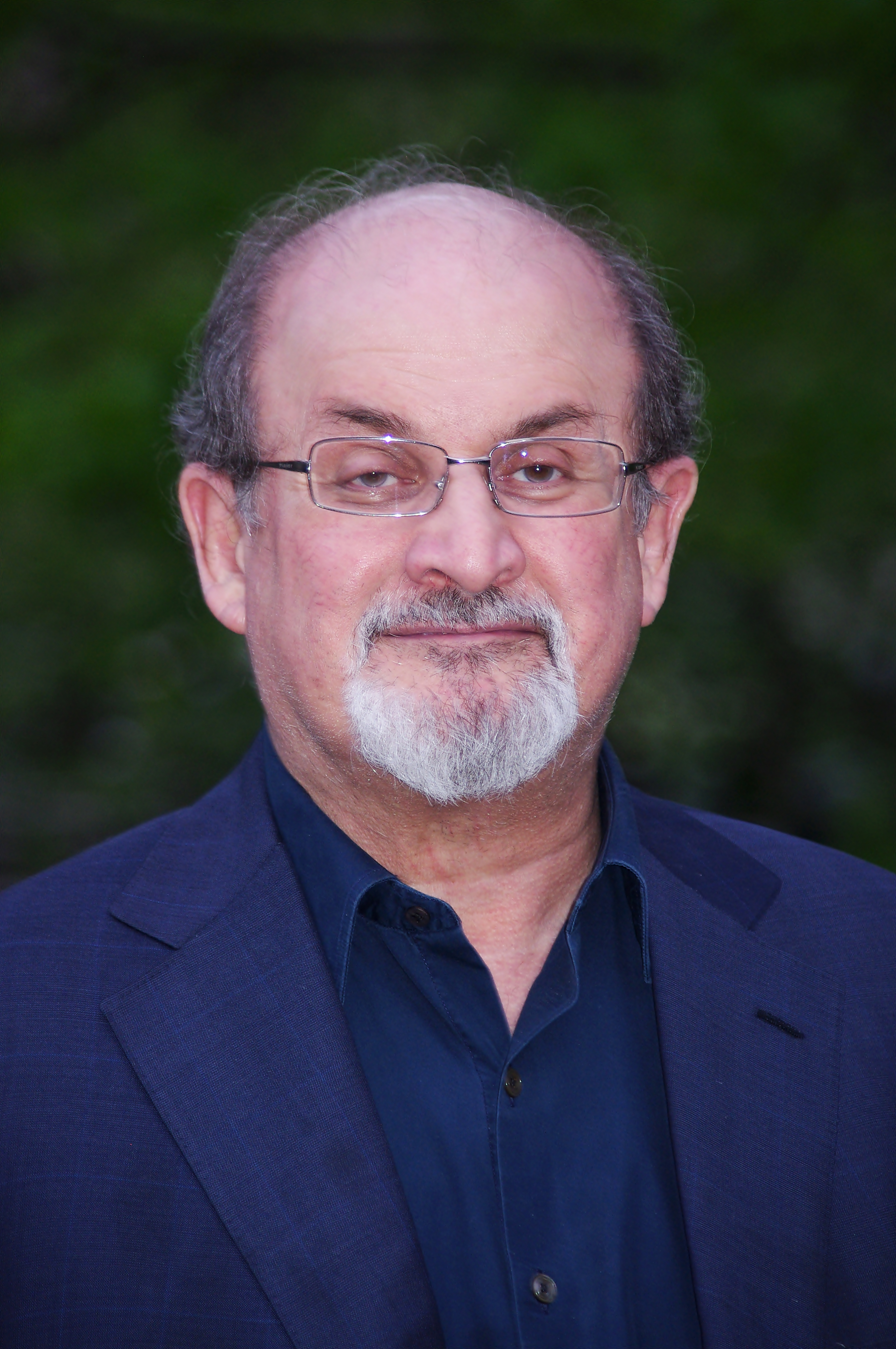
Salman Rushdie cancelled his complete tour of India citing possible threats to his life as the primary reason

The 2012 festival was held from 20 to 24 January, with the talk-show host Oprah Winfrey and author Salman Rushdie among the names announced in advance. Rushdie later cancelled, and indeed cancelled his complete tour of India, citing possible threats to his life as the primary reason. Rushdie investigated police reports that hitmen had been hired to assassinate him and implied that the police might have exaggerated the potential danger.

Police said that Ruchir Joshi, Jeet Thayil, Hari Kunzru and Amitava Kumar fled Jaipur on the advice of officials at the Jaipur Literature Festival after reading excerpts from The Satanic Verses, which is banned in India. Kunzru later wrote, "Our intention was not to offend anyone's religious sensibilities, but to give a voice to a writer who had been silenced by a death threat".

A proposed video link session between Rushdie and the Jaipur Literature Festival ran into difficulty after the government pressured the festival to stop it.

Rushdie expressed disappointment "on behalf of India", "an India in which religious extremists can prevent free expression of ideas at a literary festival, in which the politicians are too, let's say, in bed with those groups...for narrow electoral reasons, in which the police forces are unable to secure venues against demonstrators even when they know the demonstration is on its way".

The Chairman of the Press Council of India and former judge of the Supreme Court Markandey Katju said that although he was "not in favour of religious obscurantism", he found Rushdie a "poor" and "substandard writer" and the focus on him detracting from more fundamental issues of "colonial inferiority complex" among educated Indians and what a literary mission could be about. Scottish novelist Allan Massie wrote, "The response to words should be words and words in the form of argument, not abuse". Peter Florence, Director, Hay Festivals, said the whole affair showed the importance of book festivals.

On 28 January, Rushdie responded to Chetan Bhagat via Twitter after the popular writer taunted him and his work.

=== 2015 ===
The 2015 festival was scheduled from 21 to 25 January. Earlier that year it had been reported that the tentative list of speakers this season would number 181, including V. S. Naipaul, Chetan Bhagat and Amish Tripathi. The festival also expanded beyond the four walls of Diggi Palace, holding more than 300 events in 10 venues, including the Music Stage at Clarks Amer, the Jaipur BookMark at Narain Niwas, and two special sessions at Amer Fort and Hawa Mahal to focus on heritage and culture, supported by Rajasthan Tourism. Notable sessions of the festival in 2015 included two packed sessions each for Nobel Laureate Sir V. S. Naipaul and former President of India, Dr APJ Abdul Kalam, who drew a 5,000-strong crowd to the Front Lawns of Diggi Palace.

=== 2016 ===
The Jaipur Lit Fest 2016 began at the Diggi Palace as scheduled, with Gair dance from Barmer, Rajasthan accompanied by a crowd that had been waiting since early morning. The Chief Minister, Vasundhara Raje, inaugurated the festival by lighting the ceremonial lamp, and reminisced about her childhood memories of reading books. In this year, the Jaipur Literature Festival entered into the Limca Book of Records.

=== 2017 ===
Notable speakers at the Jaipur Literature Festival 2017 included writers Shashi Tharoor and Nassim Nicholas Taleb, and Rashtriya Swayamsevak Sangh leader Dattatreya Hosabale.

=== 2018 ===
The 2018 Jaipur Literature Festival was organised from 25 to 29 January at the Diggi Palace in Jaipur. The biggest yet, the event saw participation from more than 380 people from across the world, who represented over 20 international and 15 Indian languages. The participants included authors, novelists, essayists, actors, politicians, musicians, lyricists, film directors, historians, scientists, broadcasters, businesspersons, poets, translators, marketers, journalists, publishers, playwrights, critics, academics, civil servants, dancers, therapists and activists. Among the prominent speakers at the 2018 edition were Helen Fielding, Hamid Karzai, Shashi Tharoor, Anurag Kashyap, Chetan Bhagat, Chitra Mudgal, Kota Neelima, Nayantara Sahgal, Prasoon Joshi, Rajdeep Sardesai, Roly Keating, Tom Stoppard, Sagarika Ghose, Sharmila Tagore, Sheila Dikshit, Shobha De, Soha Ali Khan, Vinod Dua, Vir Sanghvi and Vishal Bhardwaj. Apart from lectures, book discussions, debates, book readings and book launches, the 2018 Jaipur Literature Festival also featured a music stage, headlined by Kailash Kher, and a theatrical dance performance at Hawa Mahal.

=== 2019 ===
The Jaipur literature festival 2019 was organised in royal Diggi palace Jaipur from 24 to 28 January 2019. Around 300 speakers were expected to visit Jaipur literature festival 2018–2019, including prominent writers such as Shobha de (known for her bold writing style), Anuradha Roy (Indian novelist, journalist), Chitra Banerjee (best known for her novel The palace of illusions). Some of the speakers including Manisha Koirala (Indian actress), Mithali raj (Indian women cricket team captain) would be the attraction of the festival who would talk about the journey and the challenges of their life. Here are few more names of Jaipur literature festival 2018–2019 are:

1. Jon Lee Anderson (American biographer, author investigative reporter)
2. Juergen Boos (CEO of the Frankfurt Book Fair)
3. Marc Quinn(British visual artist)
4. Markus Zusak (international bestselling author of The Book Thief)
5. Molly Crabapple American Writer
6. N. S. Madhavan (Malayalam fiction-writer and columnist)
7. Narendra Kohli (dramatist and comedian)
8. NoViolet Bulawayo Zimbabwean author
9. Perumal Murugan (Tamil author and literary speaker)
10. Priyamvada Natarajan (astronomer and professor at Yale)
11. Andre Aciman (author, memoirist, professor, known for the novel Call Me By Your Name)

=== 2020 ===
The Jaipur Literature Festival 2020 took place at the royal Diggi Palace from 23 to 27 January 2020. Around 300 speakers attended the Festival.

=== 2021 ===
The Jaipur Literature Festival 2021 took place Virtual edition from 19 to 28 February 2021. Around 200 speakers attended the Festival.

=== 2022 ===
The 2022 edition of the festival took place between 28 January and 1 February. The Festival hosted 250 speakers, writers, thinkers, politicians, journalists and popular cultural icons representing 21 Indian and international languages as well as major awards such as the Nobel, the Booker Prize, the Pulitzer Prize and the Sahitya Akademi Award.

- For the first time, Diggi Palace was not the primary venue.
- For the first time, the festival was not be completely free.
- Notable speakers include Nobel Prize winner, Abdulrazak Gurnah, Booker Prize winner, Damon Galgut, Indian writers Vikram Sampath, Shashi Tharoor, Saket Suman and Gurmehar Kaur.

== Format and themes ==
JLF’s five-day program includes panel discussions, book launches, poetry readings, and musical performances. Key components include:

- Diverse Participation: Nobel laureates (e.g., J.M. Coetzee, Orhan Pamuk), Pulitzer winners, and cultural icons like Oprah Winfrey have graced its stages.
- Cultural Integration: Sessions often blend literature with traditional Indian music and dance, emphasizing India’s oral traditions and multilingual heritage.
- Innovative Platforms: Parallel events like the Jaipur BookMark (a publishing industry forum) and the Jaipur Music Stage highlight its multidisciplinary approach.

== Criticism and Controversies ==
The JLF has been criticized on several grounds. In 2017, the festival hosted members of the Rashtriya Swayamsevak Sangh, a far-right paramilitary Hindu nationalist group. Several speakers pulled out of the festival in protest. The JLF's organisers defended platforming the RSS as offering "diverse viewpoints" and hosted the RSS again at the festival in 2024.

The sponsorship of the festival by Zee has been scrutinized since the channel has allegedly promoted right-wing campaigns. In 2022, multiple speakers pulled out of the JLF in New York since the event featured BJP leaders.

In 2019, following a petition, the JLF supported the #MeToo movement through a terse statement and removed several alleged sexual assaulters from the festival's speaker roster. Still, the festival organisers faced accusations of "double standards" for failing to take earlier action. 2022 saw a similar controversy over the inclusion of MJ Akbar as a speaker.

== JLF International ==
Over the years, related events have also taken place at various times in: Boulder, Colorado; Houston, Texas; Raleigh, North Carolina, Seattle, Chapel Hill, North Carolina, the British Library in London (annually 2014–2019); New York City and Valladolid in Spain
