= Daisy Rockwell =

American Hindi and Urdu language translator and artist

- Born: c. 1969; Western Massachusetts, U.S.
- Education: University of Chicago
- Known for: Writer, painter and artist, and Hindi and Urdu prose and poetry translator
- Family: Norman Rockwell (grandfather)
- Awards: International Booker Prize; 2023 Vani Foundation Distinguished Translator Award; 2023 Warwick Prize for Women in Translation

Daisy Rockwell (born 1969) is an American writer and literary translator working with Hindi and Urdu literature, and a visual artist. Her translations of South Asian classics have drawn readership and recognition for writing from the subcontinent. The most prominent of these include her translation of Krishna Sobti’s final novel, A Gujarat Here, A Gujarat There, which became the first South Asian book to win the Aldo and Jeanne Scaglione Prize for a Translation of a Literary Work in 2020.

Her English translation of Geetanjali Shree’s Tomb of Sand (Tilted Axis Press, 2021) became the first South Asian book to be shortlisted for and to win the International Booker Prize. Additional acclaim that Rockwell has received include the 2022 Warwick Prize for Women in Translation, the Distinguished Translator Award by Vani Foundation, presented at the Jaipur Literature Festival in 2023, and the English PEN x SALT Award 2025 for Our City That Year. Her work has also been supported by the NEA and the NEH, and she has been a translator in residence at Princeton University.

Rockwell has published two novels Taste and Alice Sees Ghosts and an essay collection.

== Personal life ==
Rockwell grew up in western Massachusetts. Born to artist parents, Jarvis Rockwell and Susan Merrill, she started pursuing art at an early age. She is the granddaughter of the painter, illustrator, and author Norman Rockwell.

She herself paints under the alias or takhallus Lapata, which means "missing" or "disappeared" in Urdu. Thematically, her collections are wide-ranging, often drawing from the zeitgeist or from literature. Her art has often used stylized portraiture and contemporary or historical references, although some recent work like her Quarantine Art series reveals more abstract tendencies. Meanwhile her Text and Violence series delves into text-based art.

== Education ==
Rockwell has been a student of Hindi, Urdu, Latin, French, German, and ancient Greek for many years. She first learned the Devanagari script through private tuitions when she was in school. In college at the University of Chicago, she expanded on these interests by taking coursework in Hindi, Tamil, Malayalam, and Sanskrit.

She received her Bachelors, Masters, and PhD in South Asian Literature from the University of Chicago, where she studied Hindi literature, translation, and social sciences under A K Ramanujan, Susanne Hoeber Rudolph, and Colin P Masica. In 1998, she received a grant to write her PhD dissertation on the Hindi author Upendranath Ashk, who became the first author whose work she would translate. After her PhD, Rockwell held a number of academic posts, including as the head of the Center for Southeast Asian Studies and as Vice Chair for the Institute of South Asian Studies at the University of California at Berkeley.

In recent years, she remains involved with SALT at the University of Chicago and gives academic talks at universities across the US, including at Cornell University for their Annual Tagore Lecture. She continues to shape discourse on Hindi literature through essays that look at new translations or biographies of the literary legacies of writers like Yashpal and Manto, as well as the reception of contemporary literature.

== Works ==
Some of the early classics Rockwell has translated include Upendranath Ashk's Falling Walls and Hats and Doctors, Bhisham Sahni's Tamas, and Khadija Mastur's The Women's Courtyard.

In addition to her novel-length translations, she has also brought short stories and poems into English by authors such as Arun Prakash, Shrilal Shukla, S. M. Ashraf, and by poets such as Shubham Shree and Avinash Mishra.

Translations
English-Language Title	English-Language Publication Year	Original-Language Author	Original-Language Title
Hats and Doctors	2013	Upendranath Ashk	Topiyan aur Doctor (Urdu)
Falling Walls	2015	Upendranath Ashk	Girti Deevarein (Hindi, Urdu)
Tamas	2016	Bhisham Sahni	Tamas (Hindi)
The Women's Courtyard	2018	Khadija Mastur	Aangan (Urdu)
In the City a Mirror Wandering	2019	Upendranath Ashk	Sheher Mein Ghoomta Aina (Hindi, Urdu)
A Promised Land	2019	Khadija Mastur	Zameen (Urdu)
A Gujarat Here, A Gujarat There	2019	Krishna Sobti	Gujarat Pakistan Se Gujarat Hindustan (Hindi)
Fifty-five Pillars, Red Walls	2021	Usha Priyamvada	Pachpan Khambe, Laal Deewaarein (Hindi)
Tomb of Sand	2022	Geetanjali Shree	Ret Samadhi (Hindi)
Won't You Stay, Radhika?	2023	Usha Priyamvada	Rukogi Nahin Radhika? (Hindi)
Our City That Year	2025	Geetanjali Shree	Hamara Shahar Us Baras (Hindi)
Sleep Journeys	2025	Azra Abbas	Niind ki Musafatein (Urdu)

Books
Title	Publication year	Press	Genre
Upendranath Ashk: A Critical Biography	2004	Katha	Biography
The Little Book of Terror	2012	Foxhead Books	Essay Collection
Taste	2014	Foxhead Books	Novel
Alice Sees Ghosts	2025	Bloomsbury India	Novel
Mixed Metaphors	2026	Bloomsbury India	Poetry Collection
Our Friend, Art	2027	Pushkin Press	Memoir
