= Dd's Umbrella =

Novel by Hwang Jung-eun

dd's Umbrella
- Author: Hwang Jung-eun
- Publisher: Changbi Publishers (Korean); Aki Shobo (Japanese); Tilted Axis Press (English)
- Publication date: January 11, 2019 (Korean); September 18, 2020 (Japanese); April 15, 2025 (English)
- Publication place: South Korea
- Pages: 340 (Korean); 288 (Japanese); 256 (English)
- ISBN: 9788936437541

dd's Umbrella (Korean: 디디의 우산; RR: Didi ui usan) is a 2019 novel by Hwang Jung-eun published by Changbi Publishers. In 2020, a Japanese translation by Saito Mariko was published by Aki Shobo. In 2025, an English translation by e. yaewon was published by Tilted Axis Press.

== Synopsis ==
The book consists of two novellas. The first follows d, a non-binary airport worker in Seoul mourning the loss of their lover, dd, who died in a car accident. The second involves a writer, named Kim Soyoung, as she reflects on her life and the difficulties faced by her and her significant other, Seo Sookyung, as lesbians in South Korea. Both novellas take place amid national grief of the Sewol ferry disaster, as well as Park Geun-hye's corruption scandal.

== Critical reception ==
Publishers Weekly said that Hwang "shines an illuminating light on the repression that persists amid social progress" and called her novel "a tender and revealing portrait of characters on the margins."

Asian Review of Books lauded Hwang's writing of grief, discrimination, and memory. The New Yorker, in a briefly noted book review, called the novel "a tender, spooky portrait of outcast friends and lovers" with "tragedies both local and universal." Similarly, Singapore Unbound noted that it was "neither plot nor character-driven" but rather "atmosphoric and meandering" with "quiet and minimalistic prose." The Korea Times observed the novel's relevant perspective on the "unfinished business" of revolution in South Korea, stating that it "leaves us with the task to turn our attention to the unchanged part of history—the continued exclusion of the socially marginalized. For them, the revolution, both big and small, is far from being over."
