= Tomb of Sand =

2018 Hindi novel by Geetanjali Shree

- First edition cover
- Author: Geetanjali Shree
- Translator: Daisy Rockwell
- Language: Hindi
- Publisher: Rajkamal Prakashan (Hindi); Tilted Axis Press and Penguin Books India (English)
- Publication date: 2018 (original); 2021 (translation)
- Publication place: India
- Pages: 376 (Hindi); 696 (English)

Tomb of Sand (originally titled Ret Samadhi, Hindi: रेत समाधि) is a 2018 Hindi-language novel by Indian author Geetanjali Shree. It was translated into English by U.S. translator Daisy Rockwell. In 2022, the book became the first novel translated from an Indian language to win the International Booker Prize.

== Plot ==
In northern India, an eighty-year-old woman slips into deep depression after the death of her husband, and then resurfaces to gain a new lease on life. Her determination to fly in the face of convention – including striking up a friendship with a transgender person – confuses her bohemian daughter, who is used to thinking of herself as the more modern of the two.

To her family's dismay, Ma insists on travelling to Pakistan, simultaneously confronting the unresolved trauma of her teenage experiences of the Indian Partition, and re-evaluating what it means to be a mother, a daughter, a feminist.

== Critical reception ==
The novel received praise from book critics in India and elsewhere. Writing in The Hindu, reviewer Mini Kapoor described it as "a stunningly powerful story about stories that never end". Vighnesh Hampapura and Shree Thaarshini, reviewing in Scroll.in, called Tomb of Sand an original and undefinable novel, appreciating its "wild tendency toward free association loosens the borders with which we frame the world," and especially applauded the translator's ingenuity in capturing the novel's dizzy language. Novelist Alka Saraogi, writing in The Book Review, praised the novel for "its sweeping imagination and sheer power of language, unprecedented and uninhibited". Frank Wynne, chair of the 2022 International Booker judges, said it was "enormously engaging and charming and funny and light, despite the various subjects it's dealing with". He added that Rockwell's translation was "stunningly realised, the more so because so much of the original depends on wordplay, on the sounds and cadences of Hindi".

== Accolades ==
In addition to winning the 2022 International Booker Prize and 2022 Warwick Prize for Women in Translation in its English translation, the French translation (Ret Samadhi, au-delà de la frontière: Éditions des Femmes, Paris, 2020; tr. Annie Montaut) was shortlisted for the 2021 Émile Guimet Prize for Asian Literature.
