= Jung Yewon =

South Korean translator

Jung Yewon (Korean: 정예원) is a South Korean translator of contemporary Korean-language fiction into English. Her translations include One Hundred Shadows by Hwang Jung-eun (2016) and No One Writes Back by Jang Eun-jin (2013). In 2011, Jung won the Korea Times Modern Korean Literature Translation Award for her English translation of Jung Young-moon's short story A Way of Remembrance. Her subsequent translation of Jung Young-moon's Vaseline Buddha was awarded the 2017 LTI Korea Translation Award.

== Early life and education ==
Jung was born in Seoul but, at the age of 12, she moved to the USA. She holds a BA in English from Brigham Young University, Utah, and a master's degree from the Graduate School of Interpretation and Translation at Hankuk University in Seoul.

== Translations ==
- A Most Ambiguous Sunday and Other Stories by Jung Young-moon (ISBN 978-1-56478-916-7), translated with Inrae You Vinciguerra and Louis Vinciguerra, Dalkey Archive, 2013
- No One Writes Back by Jang Eun-jin (ISBN 978-1-56478-960-0), Dalkey Archive, 2013
- Vaseline Buddha by Jung Young-moon (ISBN 978-1-941920-34-3), Deep Vellum, 2016
- One Hundred Shadows by Hwang Jungeun (ISBN 978-1-911284-02-4), Tilted Axis, 2016
- Mannequin by Choe Yun (ISBN 978-1-62897-152-1), Dalkey Archive, 2016
- Seven Samurai Swept Away in a River by Jung Young-moon (ISBN 978-1-941920-85-5), Deep Vellum, 2019
- The Only Child by Mi-ae Seo (ISBN 978-1-78607-855-1), Oneworld Publications, 2020
- The Specters of Algeria by Hwang Yeo Jung (ISBN 978-1-7398225-6-9), Honford Star, 2023
- The New Seoul Park Jelly Massacre by Cho Yeeun (ISBN 978-1-915829-03-0), Honford Star, 2024
- Shift by Cho Yeeun (ISBN 978-1-915829-34-4), Honford Star, 2026
