= Norman Erikson Pasaribu =

Indonesian writer

- Born: 1990 (age 35–36); Jakarta, Indonesia
- Education: Indonesian State College of Accountancy
- Occupation: writer
- Years active: 2014–present
- Notable work: Sergius seeks Bacchus, Happy Stories, Mostly
- Awards: PEN Translates Award (2018), Republic of Consciousness Prize (2022), the DAAD Artists-in-Berlin Program (2025)

Norman Erikson Pasaribu is an Indonesian-language poet, translator, editor, and writer of short stories.

== Biography ==
Norman Erikson Pasaribu was born in 1990 in Jakarta, Indonesia. They are of Catholic Toba Batak background and are Queer. They began to write poetry from a young age. Among their literary influences are Budi Darma, Claudia Rankine, Herta Müller, Joni Mitchell and Mary Gordon.

Pasaribu's first book was the 2014 collection of short stories Hanya Kamu yang Tahu Berapa Lama Lagi Aku Harus Menunggu (You Alone Know How Long I Have to Wait), published by Gramedia Pustaka Utama. It was a finalist for the 2014 Khatulistiwa Literary Award for Prose. Their next book was the 2015 poetry collection Sergius Mencari Bacchus (Sergius seeks Bacchus). The book was critically well received and won first prize at the Jakarta Arts Council’s Poetry Manuscript Competition and was a finalist for the 2016 Khatulistiwa Literary Award for Poetry. The book was translated into English by Tiffany Tsao, with whom Pasaribu developed a close working relationship and friendship. The book was published by Tilted Axis Press and won the 2018 PEN Translates Award. Pasaribu also won the 2017 Young Author Award from the Southeast Asia Literary Council. In 2024, Pasaribu published their first book of poetry written originally in English, My Dream Job. About the book, Bhanu Kapil said, "... the collection inverts then rotates the condition of memory to emanate carefree, surreal logics." Pasaribu co-edited In the Back of My Throat, an anthology about queer Indonesian experiences across borders and other stories told with no shame.

Pasaribu's Happy Stories, Mostly (translated by Tiffany Tsao) won the 2022 Republic of Consciousness Prize and was longlisted for the 2022 International Booker Prize. The book received positive critical attention, including from the New York Times, which found it unhappy but meaningful.

In 2022, Pasaribu was the English PEN international writer in residence at Essex Writers House in Southend-on-Sea in the United Kingdom. They were the 2023–2024 Artist in Residence at the Harvard University Asia Center in Boston in the United States. In 2025, Pasaribu was selected as one of the fellows of the DAAD Artist-in-Berlin Program.

== Selected works ==
- Hanya Kamu yang Tahu Berapa Lama Lagi Aku Harus Menunggu: kumpulan cerita (Gramedia Pustaka Utama, 2014)
- Sergius Mencari Bacchus: 33 puisi (Gramedia Pustaka Utama, 2016)
  - translated to English by Tiffany Tsao as Sergius Seeks Bacchus (Tilted Axis/Giramondo Publishing, 2019)
- Cerita-Cerita Bahagia, Hampir Seluruhnya (Gramedia Pustaka Utama, 2020)
  - translated to English by Tiffany Tsao as Happy Stories, Mostly (The Feminist Press, 2023)
- Saudara Kembarmu di Dunia Kertas (Gramedia Pustaka Utama, 2020)
- Nama-Nama Lain untuk Masa Lalu (Kepustakaan Populer Gramedia, 2026)
