= Shripad Raghunath Joshi =

Marathi writer

Shripad Raghunath Joshi (1920–2002) was a Marathi author from Maharashtra, India.

Joshi was born in the Kolhapur district of Maharashtra.

Under the leadership of Mahatma Gandhi, he participated in the Indian struggle for freedom from the British Raj. For his freedom activities, the British rulers had imprisoned him during 1942 - 1944 at Yerawada prison.

Joshi wrote mostly in Marathi or Hindi 194 books on different topics, including one on various facets of Mahatma Gandhi's life, a seven-volume travelogue, and a book on Muslim culture. He translated some Urdu poetry into Marathi.

Maharashtra state government honored Joshi with Santwan award in 1980.

He was awarded Sahitya Akademi Translation Prize (1990) for his Marathi translation of Hindi Novel 'Rag Darbari' written by Shrilal Shukla.

== Works ==
- Ravīndranāth Āṇi Mahārāshṭra (1961)
- Chinārachyā Chhāyet (1962)
- Muslim Saṇ Āṇi Sãnskār (1962)
- Anantā, Kāy Re Kelãs Hẽ? (1962)
- Gāndhījī : Ek Jhalak (1962)
- Grāmīṇ Vikāsāchī Wāṭachāl (1962)
- Chīnachē Ākramaṇ Wa Gāndhīvād (1963)
- Vividha Bhāratī (1964)
- Tāmbaḍī Mātī, Hirave Māḍ (1964)
- Mī Bhūmiputra (1966)
- Mahatma, My Bapu (1968)
- Purvāñkalāchī Muśhāphirī (1969)
- Mahārāshṭrache Samāj-Sudhārak (1969)
- Vāḷavaṇṭātīl Chandrakor (1977)
- Jīvanda-Sugandha (1977)
- Ulagā-Ulag (1983)
- Turuṅgātale Divas (1985)
- Śrīmānas (1990)
- Vichārayātrā (1992)
- Akherachã Parva (2000)
- Abalānche Āsu
- Bhārat Bhraman
