= Raga Darbari =

Raga Darbari may refer to:

- Darbari Kanada, an Indian raga also known as Raga Darbari
- Raag Darbari (novel), a 1968 novel by Shreelal Shukla
