= Tiffany Tsao =

Australian literary translator and writer

- Born: 1983 (age 42–43); San Diego, California
- Education: University of California, Berkeley
- Occupations: Literary translator, writer
- Years active: 2015–present
- Notable work: The Majesties; Sergius seeks Bacchus (as translator); People from Bloomington (as translator)
- Awards: PEN Translation Prize; NSW Premier's Translation Prize; PEN Presents x International Booker Prize
- Website: https://tiffanytsao.com/

Tiffany Tsao is an American-born literary translator and writer based in Sydney, Australia. She has translated a number of Indonesian writers into English, including Norman Erikson Pasaribu, Budi Darma, and Dewi Lestari.

== Biography ==
Tsao was born in San Diego, California, United States in 1983. Her family are of Indonesian Chinese background and she lived in Singapore and Jakarta, Indonesia for extended periods during her youth.

Tsao obtained a BA in English literature from Wellesley College, a liberal arts college in Massachusetts, graduating in 2004; during that time she began to write her first novel The Oddfits. In 2009 she was awarded a PhD in English literature by the University of California, Berkeley, where she also formally studied the Indonesian language. After leaving Berkeley she worked as an academic teaching English literature at the Georgia Institute of Technology, the University of Sydney, and the University of Newcastle, Australia. In 2015, she left academia to focus full-time on writing and translation, although she remained based in Sydney.

Tsao's first novel, The Oddfits, was published in 2016. The sequel was called The More Known World and came out the following year. Her novel about a Chinese Indonesian family, Under Your Wings, was published in Australia in 2018 and released in the US and UK as The Majesties in 2020 to largely positive reviews. Her most recent novel, But Won't I Miss Me, was published in 2026.

Tsao became more involved in literary translation after leaving academia. She got the opportunity to start translating Indonesian literary works to English when Indonesia was featured at the Frankfurt Book Fair. In the late 2010s she translated a number of works, including Paper Boats by Dee Lestari (2017) and The Birdwoman's Palate by Laksmi Pamuntjak (2018). The writer she has translated the most is Norman Erikson Pasaribu, with her translation of their Sergius seek Bacchus (2018) winning the PEN Translates Award. The two developed a close working relationship and friendship. Tsao's English translation of Pasaribu's novel Happy Stories, Mostly won the 2022 Republic of Consciousness Prize and was longlisted for the 2022 International Booker Prize

At Pasaribu's encouragement, Tsao obtained the rights to translate Budi Darma's Orang-Orang Bloomington, which she had been wanting to translate since first reading the collection in 2016. She corresponded closely with Darma during the translation process, which took place over the COVID-19 pandemic. Tragically, Darma passed away before the English translation was published as People from Bloomington by Penguin Classics in 2022. The translation was well received, and won a PEN Translation Award as well as a NSW Premier's Translation Prize.

In 2025, Tsao was one of the inaugural winners of the PEN Presents x International Booker Prize for a sample translation of The Born Out of Wedlock Club by Grace Tioso.

== Selected works ==
=== As author ===
- The Oddfits (AmazonCrossing, 2016)
- The More Known World (AmazonCrossing, 2017)
- The Majesties (Atria Books, 2020)
- But Won't I Miss Me (HarperVia, 2026)

=== As translator ===
- Paper Boats by Dee Lestari (Amazon Publishing, 2017)
- The Birdwoman's Palate by Laksmi Pamuntjak (AmazonCrossing, 2018)
- Sergius Seeks Bacchus by Norman Erikson Pasaribu (Tilted Axis/Giramondo Publishing, 2019)
- Kitchen Curse: Stories by Eka Kurniawan (co-translator, Verso, 2019)
- Happy Stories, Mostly by Norman Erikson Pasaribu (Tilted Axis, 2021)
- People from Bloomington by Budi Darma (Penguin Classics, 2022)
