= Small Remedies =

Small Remedies is a novel by Indian author Shashi Deshpande published in 2000.

== Plot summary ==
Madhu, a writer, lost her son due to the incident of the 1992 Ayodhya Babri Masjid bombing. To recover, Madhu travels to a town to write about Savitribai, a woman that decided to leave her husband and move over to another city to pursue her passion of music and starts living with her Muslim lover and accompanist. While writing about Savitribai and living in Bhavanipur, she searches for the true meaning of her life and tries to come to terms with her grief over her son's death.the story revolves around Madhu.

== Reception ==
Mohit K. Ray, the author of The Atlantic Companion to Literature in English, said that the novel "reaffirms Shashi Deshpande as one of the leading fiction writers in India". S.P. Sree, the author of Alien Among Us: Reflections Of Women Writers On Women, called Small Remedies "the best novel Shashi Deshpande has written since The Long Silence". The novel was reviewed by the Indian journal Manushi and has a page in the 2008 edition of the book 1001 Books To Read Before You Die.
