= Nita Kumar =

American anthropologist

Nita Kumar is an anthropologist. She completed her Ph.D. from the University of Chicago in History and has taught at the University of Chicago, Brown University, and the University of Michigan among other places. She presently holds the Brown Family Chair of South Asian History at Claremont McKenna College, Claremont, California. Kumar studied Anthropology alongside History and has been productive in research and publishing in both fields. She has further moved on to include women's and gender studies, literary criticism, education and performance studies in her approach.

From 1990, Kumar has been associated with NIRMAN, a non-profit NGO that works for education and the arts in Varanasi, India. Kumar's scholarship has included a questioning of the pursuit of agency and ‘justice’ in history, and the responsibilities of the scholar towards her subject(s) of study. At NIRMAN, Kumar has taught, written curricula, trained teachers, and worked on children's books and arts. She has worked with weavers’ children, working-class women, and village families. These are also subjects she has written the histories and anthropologies of.

Kumar has presented her research on education, democracy, modernity, and children in India at numerous places, and continues to do so.

== Selected publications ==
- The Artisans of Banaras (Princeton, 1988)
- Friends, Brothers and Informants: Fieldwork Memoirs of Banaras (Berkeley, 1992)
- Women as Subjects, ed. (Virginia and Calcutta, 1994)
- Lessons from Schools (Sage, 2001)
- Mai, trans., by Geetanjali Shree (Kali for Women, 2001)
- The Politics of Gender, Community and Modernities: Essays on Education in India (Oxford, 2007)
- Women, Gender and History in India (London, 2023)
