= Sangeeta Bandyopadhyay =

Sangeeta Bandyopadhyay (born 23 November 1974) is a Bengali author, film critic and newspaper columnist.

== Early life and education ==
Sangeeta Bandyopadhyay was born in 1974 in Durgapur in Paschim Bardhaman district in West Bengal, India. She was educated at Bagbazar Multipurpose School and later at Gokhale Memorial Girls' College.

== Career ==
In 2001, Bandyopadhyay's poetry was published in the Bengali literary magazine, Desh. Having moved to Kolkata in 1996, in 2016, she relocated to London to live with her husband, a British citizen.

Since the publication of her debut novel, Shankini, in 2006, Bandyopadhyay has written fourteen novels and over sixty five short stories. Her work experiments with atypical narrative styles and explores themes of sexuality, class, fate and identity. Due to social taboos, her depictions of female sexuality in particular have made Bandyopadhyay controversial in India.

== Awards and honours ==
In 2017, Arunava Sinha's English translation of Bandyopadhyay’s The Yogini was a winner of a PEN Translates Award.

== Works ==
- Shankini (শঙ্খিনী), Ananda Publishers, 2006. ISBN 978-81-7756-583-6
- Panty and Other Stories (প্যানটি ও অন্যান্য গল্প), Ananda Publishers, 2006. (Panty, Hamish Hamilton, 2014; trans. Arunava Sinha). ISBN 9788177566055 (Bengali); ISBN 9780670087020 (English)
- Abandon (রুহ্‌), Ananda Publishers, 2008. (Abandon, HarperCollins Publishers India, 2013; trans. Arunava Sinha). ISBN 978-93-5029-655-4 (English)
- Ghats (ঘাট), Ananda Publishers, 2010. ISBN 978-81-7756-927-8
- The Yogini (যোগিনী), Ananda Publishers, 2009. (The Yogini, Titled Axis Press, 2019; trans. Arunava Sinha). ISBN 978-81-7756-784-7 (Bengali); ISBN 978-1-911284-27-7 (English)
- Hidden Treasure, Zubaan Publishers, 2024; trans. Ipsa S. ISBN 9788194253341
