= Diggi Palace =

Building in India

Coordinates: 26.909999°N 75.812536°E

General information
- Location: Jaipur, Rajasthan, India, Shivaji Marg, C-Scheme, Jaipur, Rajasthan
- Opening: 1991
- Owner: Ram Pratap Singh Diggi and Jyotika Kumari Diggi
- Operator: Diggi family

Other information
- Number of rooms: 70
- Number of suites: 39

Website
- Official website

Diggi Palace is an Indian royal palace located in Jaipur, Rajasthan. It was converted into a heritage hotel, but a part is still occupied by the royal family, which also runs the hotel. The annual Jaipur Literature Festival has been held here since 2006.

== History ==
The former haveli belongs to the Thakurs (Khangarot Rajputs) of Diggi, a thikana or estate 75 km south-west from Jaipur, earlier part of the Jaipur state.

Diggi Palace was built in 1860 by Thakur Saheb Pratap Singh Ji Diggi of the ruling family of the Diggi principality. Part of the property was converted into a heritage hotel in 1991 by Thakur Ram Pratap Singh Diggi and his family.

The portion of the palace used as the hotel was originally the janana or women's quarters, of the Diggi family's townhouse in Jaipur.

Jaipur Literature Festival in 2019

Diggi Palace served as the venue for the Jaipur Literature Festival from 2006 to 2020.

== Architecture ==
The Diggi Palace exemplifies Rajasthani Haveli design, with multiple interconnected blocks organized around courtyards. According to Architectural Digest, the 19th-century palace "is not just home to ornate courtyards, darbars [audience halls] and expansive lush gardens". The complex covers roughly 18 acres in central Jaipur and includes numerous pillared reception rooms, arched gateways and landscaped gardens. Local reports note that the architecture "reflects the country’s history, culture and tradition," with fresco-decorated doorways and traditional Rajasthani motifs throughout.

The buildings are characterised by pale blue façades and traditional Rajput-style architectural elements. The property is set around a large lawn and established gardens.
