= Bhubanmohan Baruah =

Writer

- Born: 1914; Assam, India
- Died: 10 May 1998; Shillong, India
- Occupations: Novelist, Short story writer
- Writing career
- Pen name: Kanchan Barua
- Language: Assamese
- Genre: Literature

Bhubanmohan Baruah (1914 - 1998) was a novelist, short story writer from Assam. He wrote many novels under the pen-name of Kanchan Baruah.

== Life and works ==
Baruah served as a member of the Film Finance Board of Assam Government. He was also known as a painter and artist. Moreover, he directed a number of plays.

He was a bachelor and had two brothers and two sisters.

The Government of Assam offered him literary pension.

He died in Shillong on 10 May 1998.

== Literary works ==
Baruah was author of more than twenty other novels and some short stories. Some of the novels are:

- Asimat Jar Heral Seema (অসীমত যাৰ হেৰাল সীমা) (1945)
- Puwoti tora (পূৱতি তৰা)
- Mrita bihanga (মৃত বিহংগ)
- Joya mohol (জয়া মহল)
- Ashanto prohor(অশান্ত প্ৰহৰ)
- Urmilar sokulu (উৰ্মিলাৰ চকুলো)

== See also ==
- Assamese literature
- History of Assamese literature
- List of Asam Sahitya Sabha presidents
- List of Sahitya Akademi Award winners for Assamese
- List of Assamese-language poets
- List of Assamese writers with their pen names
