= Roots and Shadows =

1983 novel by Shashi Deshpande

Roots and Shadows is an English-language Indian novel, written by Shashi Deshpande in 1983.

The novel focuses on Indu's interactions with others in her large family and the manner in which this helps to resolve their future and her own personal crisis.

== Characters ==
=== First generation ===
- Akka – The female matriarch of the family
- Indu's grandfather
- Old Uncle - Indu's grandfather's cousin

=== Second generation ===
- Narmada Atya - Indu's aunt
- Anant Kaka - Indu's uncle
- Govind - Indu's father
- Madhav Kaka and Sumitra Kaki - Indu's aunt and uncle
- Vinay Kaka and Kamala Kaki - Indu's aunt and uncle
- Sunanda Atya and Vasant Kaka - Indu's aunt and uncle
- Saroja - Naren's mother

=== Third generation ===
- Indu - Govind's daughter and the main protagonist
- Naren - Saroja's son and Indu's illicit partner
- Jayant - Indu's husband
- Hemant - Anant kaka and kaki's children
- Sumant - Anant kaka and kaki's children
- Padmini - Anant kaka and kaki's children
- Sharad -Anant kaka and kaki's children
- Sunil - Madhav kaka and Sumitra kaki's children
- Lata - Madhav kaka and Sumitra kaki's children
- Geeta -Madhav kaka and Sumitra kaki's children
- Vithal - the adopted Brahmin boy

=== Fourth generation ===
- Vishwas - Hemant's children
- Sanju - Hemant's children

== Themes ==
- Marriage
- Joint-family system
- Infidelity
- Class and caste relations
- Feminism
- Modernism

== Analysis and criticism ==
The work has been widely analysed and criticized for its feminist orientation. It has been a source for many thesis and papers on the role of women in society of today. The work is widely appreciated for bringing out the joint family system in Indian society.
