= Shalim M. Hussain =

Indian poet, translator, activist, filmmaker and academic

Shalim Muktadir Hussain
- Born: 1987 (age 38–39); Assam, India
- Education: Jamia Millia Islamia (Ph.D.)
- Occupations: Poet, translator, activist, filmmaker, academic
- Employer: University of Delhi
- Organizations: Miya Community Research Collective
- Known for: Miya poetry movement

Shalim Muktadir Hussain (born 1987) is an Indian poet, translator, activist, filmmaker and academic from Assam. He is a PhD scholar at the Department of English of Jamia Millia Islamia University, New Delhi, where he researches Assamese literary aesthetics; and is an Assistant Professor at the Bhim Rao Ambedkar and Vivekananda C colleges, University of Delhi. A leading figure in the Miya poetry movement, Hussain is a founding member of the Miya Community Research Collective.

== Works ==
Hussain's first poetry collection, Betel Nut City, was published in 2019, after winning the RL Poetry Award in 2017. Post-Colonial Poems, his English translation of poetry by the Adivasi writer Kamal Kumar Tanti was published the same year, followed by his 2020 translation of the popular Assamese novel Asimot Jar Heral Sima. In 2020, Hussain won a Literary Translation and Creative Writing Fellowship from the Charles Wallace India Trust for his anthology of English translations from the Char-Chapori Assamese and Bengali dialect, Again I Hear These Waters (published by Titled Axis Press, 2024). The first collection of Miya poetry in translation, the anthology, which includes Hafiz Ahmed's seminal Write Down ‘I am a Miyah’, won Hussain a PEN Translates award in 2021. In 2026, the collection was awarded an honourable mention for the Association for Asian Studies' A. K. Ramanujan Prize for Translation.
