= Usha Priyamvada =

Indian-born American emerita professor and writer (born 1930)

Usha Nilsson
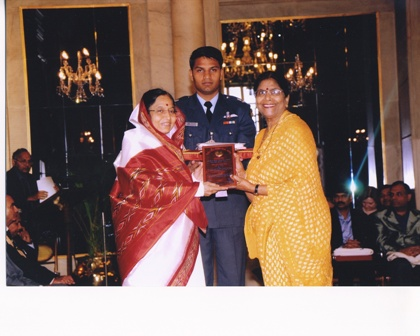
- Usha Priyamvada (r) receiving Padmabhushan Moturi Satyanarayan Award from Pratibha Patil (2009)
- Born: Usha Saksena; 1930 (age 95–96); Kanpur, British India
- Education: University of Allahabad
- Writing career
- Pen name: Usha Priyamvada
- Language: Hindi
- Years active: 1961–
- Notable work: पचपन खंबे लाल दीवार (pachpan khambe laal deewar)

Usha Priyamvada is the nom-de-plume of Usha Nilsson (née Usha Saksena; born 1930) is an Indian-born American emerita professor of South Asian Studies at the University of Wisconsin, Madison, a novelist and short-story writer in Hindi and a translator from Hindi to English. She was a winner of the Premchand Prize in 1976, and the Padmabhushan Moturi Satyanarayan Puraskar in 2009.

== Life ==
Usha Saksena was born in Kanpur in a poor family which was active in India's independence struggle. She was the youngest of three daughters raised by her mother, Priyamvada, who suffered social prejudice for being a widow.

Saksena read English literature at the University of Allahabad, obtaining her undergraduate, master's and doctorate degrees. In 1961, she obtained a Fulbright scholarship for post-doctoral studies at the University of Indiana, Bloomington. She met Kim Nilsson there, who became her husband. By 1977, the Nilssons were separated, and in 1981, she married Per Nykrog, a professor at Harvard University. Nykrog died in 2014.

== Work ==
Usha Saksena taught at the Lady Sriram College, New Delhi, before her move to the United States in 1961. She was also an assistant professor at Allahabad University.

In 1964, Usha Saksena Nilsson joined the University of Wisconsin, Madison, to teach Indian Literature and the Hindi language in the South Asian Studies department. She was granted tenure in 1968 and became a full professor in 1977.

Nilsson prepared several advanced textbooks for Hindi at the behest of the United States Department of Education, which were used at various universities across the country. Two books of readings from Hindi literature and a collection of short stories came out of the contract.

Nilsson adopted her mother's name Priyamvada into her nom-de-plume when she began writing novels and short stories. Her first novel, Pachpan Khambe Laal Deewarein, was made into a film by the BBC, and later into an Indian television series. The title was a reference to the buildings of Lady Sriram College.

Her stories address the complexities of women's lives, especially those from whom traditional society expects unflinching service and obedience. In her early works, her characters seek liberation and often succeed in obtaining agency. Some escape only to waste their opportunities, some behave selfishly towards hapless spouses (Maan Aur Hath (1953)), some end up lonely (Chhutti Ka Din (Holiday, 1969)), others gain a modicum of happiness (Phir Vasant Aaya (Spring returns, 1961)), but all somehow pick themselves up and go on with life. Nilsson's works during her US sojourn reflected the dual worlds of immigrant women: they might have more freedom of choice in the new world but still find themselves isolated as outsiders and homesick for family back home.

From January 1989, Nilsson began to broadcast weekly bulletins on life in Wisconsin as part of the BBC's Letters from America series. These proved to be popular, garnering millions of listeners every week.

In 1976, Nilsson was awarded the Premchand Prize by the Government of Uttar Pradesh for her collection of short stories. For her lifetime body of work, she received the Padmabhushan Moturi Satyanarayan Puraskar from the Indian government in 2009.

== Selected publications ==
=== Novels ===
- पचपन खम्भे लाल दीवारें (in Hindi). 1962.
  - Fifty-five pillars, red walls. Translated by Daisy Rockwell. Speaking Tiger. 2021. ISBN 978-8194490821.
- रुकोगी नहीं राधिका [You will not stop, Radhika] (in Hindi). 1967.
- शेषयात्रा (in Hindi). 1984.
- अन्तर्वंशी (in Hindi). 2000.
- भया कबीर उदास (in Hindi). 2007.
- अल्पविराम [Comma] (in Hindi). 2019.

=== Short story collections ===
- जिन्दग़ी और गुलाब के फूल [Life and roses]. Varanasi: Bharatiya Jnanapeeth. 1961.
- बनवास [Exile]. Penguin India. 2010. ISBN 978-0143104384.

=== Academic ===
- Mira Bai. Makers of Indian Literature. Sahitya Akademi. 1969. ISBN 9788126004119.
- Surdas. Makers of Indian Literature. Sahitya Akademi. 1982.

== Bibliography ==
- Miller, Nancy G. (14 September 1961). "Writer From India Enchants New Friends". Eagle-Bulletin and DeWitt News Times. Fayetteville, NY. p. 6.
- "273 At U. W. Are Promoted To Tenure Faculty Posts". The Capital Times. Madison, WI. 14 June 1968. p. 16.
- McGrath, Hazel (4 April 1973). "29 Husband-Wife Duos in U Professorial Ranks". The Capital Times. Madison, WI.
- "Gets writer's award". Wisconsin State Journal. 27 April 1976. p. 3.
- "UW Announces 136 faculty promotions". Wisconsin State Journal. 10 June 1977. p. 4.
- Judd, Joan (14 August 1977). "Cooking a Pleasure for Usha". Wisconsin State Journal.
- Wolff, Barbara (5 June 1989). "To Asians, she's voice of America". Wisconsin State Journal.
- Rustomji-Kerns, Roshni (1995). "Saksena-Nilsson, Usha". In Davidson, Cathy; Wagner-Martin, Linda (eds.). The Oxford Companion to Women's Writing in the United States. p. 775. ISBN 9780195066081.
- "UW Professor Receives Lifelong Achievement Award from Indian Government". University of Wisconsin, Madison. 15 April 2009.
- "Nykrog, Per". Wisconsin State Journal. 16 September 2014.
- Saxena, Poonam (18 December 2020). "Lifting the veil on life as an Indian woman, unattached". The Hindustan Times.
