= Miri Yu =

Zainichi Korean writer (born 1968)

- 柳美里
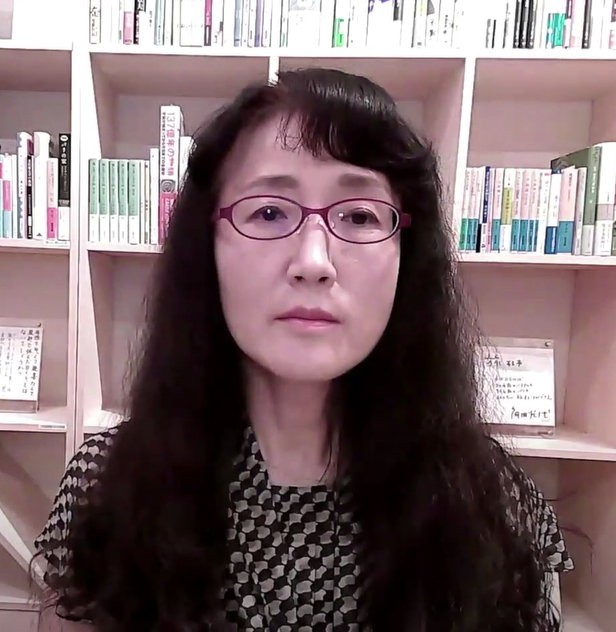
- Born: June 22, 1968 (age 58); Tsuchiura, Ibaraki, Japan
- Occupations: Playwright, novelist, essayist
- Writing career
- Language: Japanese
- Notable works: Ishi ni Oyogu Sakana (1994); Kazoku Shinema (1997); Gold Rush (1998); Inochi (2000); Tokyo Ueno Station; (2014)
- Notable awards: Akutagawa Prize; National Book Award for Translated Literature

- Miri Yu
- Hangul: 유미리
- Hanja: 柳美里
- RR: Yu Miri
- MR: Yu Miri
- In Japanese: Yū Miri

Miri Yu (柳美里, Yū Miri; Korean: 유미리; born June 22, 1968) is a Zainichi Korean playwright, novelist, and essayist. Yu writes in Japanese, her native language, but is a citizen of South Korea.

== Early life ==
Yu was born in Tsuchiura, Ibaraki Prefecture and grew up in Yokohama, Kanagawa Prefecture as one of four children born to Korean parents. Her father, a son of Korean immigrants, worked at a pachinko gambling parlor. Her mother, a refugee from the Korean War who fled to Japan from South Korea, worked as a hostess in a bar.

Yu's father was often abusive, and eventually her parents divorced when Yu was a child. A frequent victim of bullying at school, and after several suicide attempts, she found refuge in literature after reading the literary works of Edgar Allan Poe, Fyodor Dostoyevsky, William Faulkner, and Truman Capote.

== Literary career ==
After dropping out of the Yokohama Kyoritsu Gakuen high school, she joined the Tokyo Kid Brothers (東京キッドブラザース) theater troupe and worked as an actress and assistant director. In 1986, she formed a troupe called Seishun Gogetsutō (青春五月党), and the first of several plays written by her was published in 1991.

In the early 1990s, Yu switched to writing novels. Her novels include Furu Hausu (フルハウス, "Full House", 1996), which won the Noma Literary Prize for best work by a new author; Kazoku Shinema (家族シネマ, "Family Cinema," 1997), which won the prestigious Akutagawa Prize; Gōrudo Rasshu (ゴールドラッシュ, "Gold Rush" 1998), which was translated into English as Gold Rush (2002); and Hachi-gatsu no Hate (8月の果て, "The End of August," 2004). She has published a dozen books of essays and memoirs, and she was an editor of and contributor to the literary quarterly "en-taxi ". Her best-selling memoir Inochi (命, "Life") was made into a movie, also titled Inochi.

Yu's first novel, a semiautobiographical work titled Ishi ni Oyogu Sakana (石に泳ぐ魚, "The Fish Swimming in the Stone") published in the September 1994 issue of the literary journal Shinchō, became the focus of a legal and ethical controversy. The model for one of the novel's main characters—and the person referred to indirectly by the title—objected to her depiction in the story. The publication of the novel in book form was blocked by court order, and some libraries restricted access to the magazine version. After a prolonged legal fight and widespread debate over the rights of authors, readers, and publishers versus individuals' rights to privacy, a revised version of the novel was published in 2002.

After the 2011 Tōhoku earthquake and tsunami, Yu began to travel frequently to the affected areas, and, from March 16, 2012, she hosted a weekly radio show called "Yu Miri no Futari to Hitori" (柳美里の二人と一人, "Yu Miri's Two People and One Person") on a temporary emergency broadcasting station called Minamisōma Hibari FM, based in Minamisōma, Fukushima.

Her 2014 novel Tokyo Ueno Station reflects her engagement with historical memory and margins by incorporating themes of a migrant laborer from northeastern Japan and his work on Olympic construction sites in Tokyo, as well as the March 11, 2011 disaster. In November 2020, Tokyo Ueno Station won the National Book Award for Translated Literature for a translation by translator Morgan Giles.

In 2021, she was working on a novel about migrant workers titled Yonomori Station after Yonomori Station on the Jōban Line.

Her latest novel, The End of August, about a multi-generational Korean family living during the 1930s Japanese occupation, was published in 2023.

== Personal life ==
Yu has experienced racist backlash to her work because of her ethnic background, with some events at bookstores being canceled due to bomb threats.

In 1999, she became pregnant with a married man and took refuge with a former lover suffering from cancer. He took care of her during her pregnancy and died shortly after her child was born in 2000. These events form the basis of her memoir Inochi. Since April 2015, Yu has lived in Minamisōma, Fukushima. In 2018, she opened a bookstore called Full House and a theatre space called LaMaMa ODAKA at her home in Odaka District. In 2020, she was baptized at the Haramachi Catholic Church in Minamisōma and was given the name Teresa Benedicta, the religious name of Edith Stein.

She is a single mother and has one son.

== Published in English ==
- "Full House" in Into the Light: An Anthology of Literature by Koreans in Japan edited by Melissa L. Wender. (2011). ISBN 9780824834906. Translated by Melissa L. Wender.
- Gold Rush, Welcome Rain. (2002). ISBN 1-56649-283-1. Translated by Stephen Snyder.
- "Specimens of Families" in Zainichi Literature: Japanese Writings by Ethnic Koreans edited by John Lie. (2018). ISBN 1-55729-180-2. Translated by Abbie (Miyabi) Yamamoto.
- Tokyo Ueno Station, Tilted Axis. (2019). ISBN 1911284169. Translated by Morgan Giles.
- The End of August, Riverhead Books. (August 2023). ISBN 978-0593542668. Translated by Morgan Giles.
