= Asimat Jar Heral Seema =

Book by Bhubanmohan Baruah

অসীমত যাৰ হেৰাল সীমা (OXIMOT JAR HERAL XIMA)
- Author: Bhubanmohan Baruah
- Language: Assamese
- Genre: Novel
- Publisher: Smt. Ila Sarmah, M/s. Jyoti Prakashan, panbazar, Ghy-01
- Publication date: 15 July 1945
- Publication place: Assam, India
- Pages: 312 ( 7th edition)

OXIMOT JAR HERAL XIMA (Assamese: অসীমত যাৰ হেৰাল সীমা; literally: Who lost Their Limit in Infinity) is an Assamese novel written by Bhubanmohan Baruah under the pen name of Kanchan Baruah. The first edition of this book was released on 15 July 1945. Kohinoor Theatre, a group of mobile theatre of Assam staged it in 2008. The novel is one of the literary gems of Assamese language which continues to rule the heart of lakhs of people.

== Plot ==
The novel starts with the narrator, a clerk dreaming of a perfect married life with kids, who suddenly gets sucked into a black hole. He wakes up startled to realise that he is supposed to go on an expedition that very day with his four friends - a professor, a doctor, a poet and a clerk, much like the narrator himself. The five friends want to leave the humdrum of their routine life for a month and embark on a boat journey along the river Dihing in the hopes of coming across an unexplored land. After moving upstream on their boat for 15 days they unexpectedly come across a tribe of aboriginals in the dense jungles. After feasting and spending the night with the tribe, the next morning they face the revolt of their boatman and navigators who believe any journey further upstream will bring doom upon them all as the place is cursed. But the stubborn friends decide to continue the journey on their own. As they travel further, they are astounded by the breathtaking scenery at first, but as the night falls they are stuck in a violent rainstorm that takes them off course. Once the storm subsides they realise that their Professor friend is disoriented and sick and seems to be zoning in and out of his memories of his homeland from his previous birth, 1300 years ago. This is where the main story starts. It is a story of love, life, friendship, patriotism and valour.

Kamalnagar is one of the provinces of the main state, referred to as the Capital. It is a small picturesque area on the outskirts of the Capital, surrounded by hills. The river Kanchanmati divides it into two equal parts from east to west. Kamalnagar is 10 miles in length and not more than 8 miles in breadth, with a population of 25,000. There is a big concrete bridge over the Kanchanmati known as the "White Bridge" which connects the two banks. The Chieftain is the only link of Kamalnagar to the Capital. Once a year he visits the Capital to pay the taxes and update on the important issues. He stays at the "Red Castle" which is his official residence.

Chandan has just returned from the Capital after staying there for years as a student. He first visits his mother at Bokulpur, which is separated from Kamalnagar by a small stream. She has been staying there with her aides ever since Chandan's father, the ex-chieftain of Kamalnagar, died while Chandan was still a small kid. He then rushes off to Kamalnagar with Ashok to watch the annual bullfighting event on the occasion of Bihu. Gauri is also there to watch the fight with her friends. Gauri is the only daughter of Lakshminarayan and he has raised her like a princess. Her mother died during childbirth and she looks up to Uma as a mother figure. One of the bulls runs loose and Chandan saves Gauri from being ambushed by it. However, they start off on a wrong note as Gauri is annoyed that Chandan made fun of her while saving her. Actually both of them fell in love with each other but both were too proud to admit it. Chandan’s friend Uma tried to bring Chandan and Gauri together. But Chandan became reluctant to marry Gauri without taming her first. Champa, was a young girl who was brought up by Chandan’s mother. Champa was Chandan’s childhood sweet-heart and they grew up together. Chandan considers Champa as a sister. But, Champa nursed a sincere infatuation for Chandan. She considers it as her guilt. She hides her love towards Chandan with mysterious smile, fickleness and jolly behaviour. Chandan often get confused by Champa’s words and gives futile attempt to decode them. The love of Chandan and Gauri never gets time to bloom. Their beautiful life, which they wasted in sweet and sour and often massive fights, abruptly faces the most dreaded consequence as a large army approaches to attack Kamalnagar. Lakshminarayan, the mayor, Ashok, the second office bearer, and Chandan are initially unnerved as Kamalnagar had not fought a war in centuries. But Champa comes up with an elaborate strategy for war. The plan works in the beginning. The people of Kamalnagar put up a brave fight without sufficient resources. But finally the enemy outnumbered Kamalnagar’s army and entered into the city. They loot, rape and burn the houses down without any mercy. Champa and her friend, in order to save their lives, drop a roof of a temple on a troop of enemy soldiers. Ashok blows up the bridge to prevent enemy from entering the Northern side of the city. Meanwhile the enemy chief captures Gauri and her palace. They set their camp in that palace. Chandan manages to rescue Gauri by blasting the entire palace with gunpowder. The blast takes the life of the enemy chief and hundreds of enemies. Chandan and Gauri struggle further to reach a safe place during the night. In the process Chandan is injured by an enemy arrow. They end up sailing on the river on a boat. Meanwhile the death of the enemy chief frightens and demotivates the other enemies. Champa takes that advantage and starts to fire cannon over them. She manages to drive the enemy out of Kamalnagar. But finally one last enemy arrow pierces her chest. Ashok manages to rescue and bring wounded Champa home. Gauri shows her patience and courage to safely bring Chandan back home. Chandan is deeply saddened to find Champa on her death bed. Champa cryptically declares her love for Chandan before taking her last breath in his arms. Chandan and Gauri hope to rebuild devastated Kamalnagar anew. But they fail and the city slowly wastes away over time. Professor’s eyes fill with tears as he concludes his narrative. Friends’ hearts fill with innate human emotions as they repair the boat and sail back home. Narrator realises that a perfect life is only possible in dreams but not in reality.

== Characters ==
- Chandan - Main Protagonist. Professor in the present birth. Son of the ex-chieftain of Kamalnagar.
- Champa - An orphan, she is the childhood friend of Chandan and the most beautiful girl in the whole of Kamalnagar. Her love for Chandan is unrequited.
- Gauri - Female protagonist. Beauty personified. She is the only daughter of Lakshminarayan. She and Chandan share a love-hate relationship at first.
- Ashok - Chandan's best friend. Second in command to Lakshminarayan. Married to Uma, has 2 kids.
- Uma - Ashok's wife, mother of his 2 kids. She is a warm lady who is loved by all. Plays the role of mediator between Chandan and Gauri.
- Lakshminarayan - The chieftain of Kamalnagar. Father of Gauri. A widower.
- Rama - The maid of Ashok's household.
- The barbaric invaders.

== Selected notable adaptations ==
- 2008: Kohinoor Theatre, a group of mobile theatre of Assam staged it in 2008.
- 2021: All India Radio Guwahati station aired Asimat Jar Heral Seema. The story was narrated and the main protagonist, Chandan was voiced by Indrajit Das. Champa was voiced by actress Barsha Rani Bishaya. Every Friday All India Radio Guwahati broadcast a new episode of this Novel on Radio, Facebook, and YouTube.
