= Geetanjali Shree =

Indian writer (born 1957)

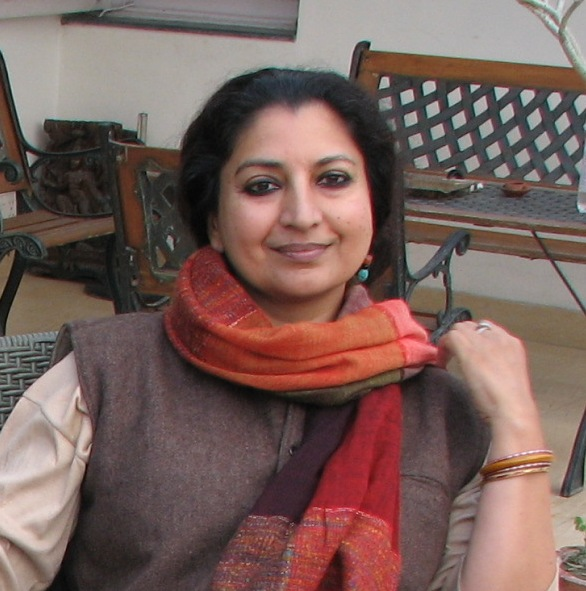
- Geetanjali Shree in February 2010
- Born: Geetanjali Pandey; 12 June 1957 (age 69); Mainpuri, Uttar Pradesh, India
- Writing career
- Language: Hindi
- Genres: Novels, short stories
- Notable work: Tomb of Sand
- Notable awards: International Booker Prize (2022)

Geetanjali Shree (Hindi pronunciation: [giːt̪ãːˈd͡ʒəlɪ ʃɾiː]; born 12 June 1957), also known as Geetanjali Pandey, (Note: Her birth name is Geetanjali Pandey, but she took her mother's first name Shree as her last name.) is an Indian Hindi-language novelist and short-story writer based in New Delhi, India. She is the author of several short stories and five novels. Her 2000 novel Mai was shortlisted for the Crossword Book Award in 2001, while its English translation by Nita Kumar was published by Niyogi Books in 2017. In 2022, her novel Ret Samadhi (2018), translated into English as Tomb of Sand by Daisy Rockwell, won the International Booker Prize. Aside from fiction, she has written critical works on Premchand.

== Early life and education ==
Shree was born in the city of Mainpuri in Uttar Pradesh state on 12 June 1957. Her father, Anirudh Pandey, was a civil servant, causing her family to live in various towns throughout Uttar Pradesh. Shree says that it was this upbringing in Uttar Pradesh, along with a lack of children's books in English, that gave her a rich connection to Hindi. She is ancestrally from Ghazipur District, Gondaur village.

At university, she studied history. She completed a BA at Lady Shri Ram College, and a master's degree from Jawaharlal Nehru University in New Delhi. After beginning her PhD work at Maharaja Sayajirao University of Baroda on the Hindi writer Munshi Premchand, Shree became more interested in Hindi literature. She wrote her first short story during her PhD, and turned to writing after graduation.

== Writing career ==
Her first story, "Bel Patra" (1987), was published in the literary magazine Hans and was followed by a collection of short stories Anugoonj (1991).

The English translation of her novel Mai catapulted her to fame. The novel is about three generations of women and the men around them, in a North Indian middle-class family. Mai has been translated into several languages, including Serbian and Korean. It has also been translated into English by Nita Kumar, who was awarded the Sahitya Akademi Translation Prize, and into Urdu by Bashir Unwan with a preface by Intizar Hussain. Other translations of the novel include a French translation by Annie Montaut, and a German translation by Reinhold Schein.

Shree's second novel Hamara Shahar Us Baras is set loosely after the incidents of Babri Masjid demolition. Its English translation by Daisy Rockwell, her second collaboration with Shree, was published in 2024. A review on Scroll.in regards the novel's form as perhaps the only way to capture the "psychic context of communalism" that concerns the novel and its social world.

Her fourth novel, Khālī jagah (2006), has been translated into English by Nivedita Menon as The Empty Space, French by Nicola Pozza as Une place vide, and German by Georg Lechner and Nivedita Menon as Im leeren Raum.

Her fifth novel, Ret Samadhi (2018), has been commended by Alka Saraogi for "its sweeping imagination and sheer power of language, unprecedented and uninhibited". It has been translated into English by Daisy Rockwell as Tomb of Sand, and into French by Annie Montaut as Au-delà de la frontière. On 26 May 2022, Tomb of Sand won the International Booker Prize, becoming the first book in Hindi and the first from an Indian writer to receive the accolade.

== Bibliography ==
=== Novels ===
- Mai (1993) – translated as Mai Silently Motherly by Nita Kumar (2017)
- Hamara Shahar Us Baras (1998) – translated as Our City That Year by Daisy Rockwell (2024)
- Tirohit (2001) – translated as The Roof Beneath Their Feet by Rahul Soni (2013)
- Khali Jagah (2006) – translated as The Empty Space by Nivedita Menon (2011)
- Ret Samadhi (2018) – translated as Tomb of Sand by Daisy Rockwell (2022)
- Sah-Saa | सह-सा (2025)

=== Short story collections ===
- March, Ma Aur Sakura (2008)
- Pratinidhi Kahaniyan (2015)
- Yahan Hathi Rahte The (2022)
- Vairagya (2022)
- Anugunj (2022)

=== Academic publications ===
- Between Two Worlds: An Intellectual Biography of Premchand
- "Premchand and Industrialism: A Study in Attitudinal Ambivalence", The Indian Economic and Social History Review, XIX(2), 1982
- "Premchand and the Peasantry: Constrained Radicalism", Economic and Political Weekly, XVIII(26), 25 June 1983.
- "The North Indian Intelligentsia and the Hindu-Muslim Question"

== Other activities ==
Shree also participates in theatre and works with Vivadi, a theatre group comprising writers, artists, dancers, and painters.

== Awards and honours ==
Shree is the recipient of the Indu Sharma Katha Samman award and has been a fellow of the Ministry of Culture, India, and Japan Foundation.

In 2022, Tomb of Sand became the first Hindi-language novel shortlisted for the International Booker Prize and subsequently won the prize.

In December 2022, Shree was named on the BBC's 100 Women list as one of the world's inspiring and influential women of the year.

== See also ==
- List of Hindi-language authors
- Tomb of Sand
