= A Matter of Time (Deshpande novel) =

1996 novel by Shashi Deshpande

A Matter of Time is a 1996 novel by Shashi Deshpande. Unusually in Deshpande's fiction the focus is on the impact of the actions of a male character, Gopal, who leaves his family.
