= Hemant Shesh =

- Born: 28 December 1952 (age 73); Jaipur, Rajasthan, India
- Occupations: Writer, Poet, painter, photographer and Ex-senior Civil Servant
- Known for: Published 27 books of own work

Hemant Shesh (born 28 December 1952) is an Indian Hindi writer, poet and civil servant.

== Biography ==
Hemant Shesh completed his post graduate education in Sociology from the University of Rajasthan in Jaipur in 1977. He then joined the Rajasthan Administrative Service in the same year. He has worked on many senior positions in the Government including Secretary to His Excellency the Governor of Rajasthan, Secretary Rajasthan Public Service Commission, Secretary, Rajasthan Information Commission, and also as District collector and magistrate in Pratapgarh district of Rajasthan state. Hemant Shesh has retired from the Indian Administrative Service as Registrar for the Board of revenue in Ajmer, Rajasthan.

== Writings and publications ==
He has published over 48 books, including 27 of his own writings. He was the founder-editor of Kala-Prayojan, a quarterly literary magazine. Among his published works are more than thirteen poetry collections.

=== Books published ===
- Jaari Itihaas Ke Viruddha (poem), 1974
- Beswaad Hawayen (monograph), 1981
- Kripal Singh Shekhawat (monograph), 1981
- Ghar-Baahar (poetry collection), 1982
- Neend men Mohenjodaro (poetry collection), 1988
- Vrikshon Ke Swapna (poetry collection), 1988
- Ashuddha Saarang (poetry collection), 1991
- Kasht Ke Liye Kshamaa (poetry collection), 1995
- Kripayaa anyathaa Na Len (poem), 1999
- Aap Ko yah Jaan Kar Prasanntaa Hogee (poetry collection), 2001
- Jagah Jaasee Jagah (poetry collection), 2006
- Bahut Kuchh Jaisaa Kuchh Naheen (poetry collection), 2007
- Prapanch-Saar-Subodhnee (poetry collection), 2009
- Khed-Yog-Pradeep (poetry collection), 2012
- Raat Ka pahaad (short story collection), 2012
- Pyashchitta Praveshika (poetry collection), 2018
- Afsos Darpan (poetry collection), 2019
- Bhulne Kaa Vipaksh (memoirs), 2019
- Chaar Sharanaame (history), 2019
- Iti Jaisa Shabd (poetry collection), 2019
- Na Hone Jisaa Honaa (poetry collection), 2019
- Gadya Ke Rang (prose collection), 2021
- Gadya Ka DeshKaal (literary criticism), 2022
- Kasht-Kalpdrum (poem), 2024
- Yaad kii Aawaaz Mein (memoirs), 2024
- Gadya Kii Gali (Prose), 2024
- Gadya kii Barahkhadii (Prose), 2025

== Awards ==
He was awarded the K. K. Birla Foundation's Bihari Puraskar, a national award for the year 2009 for his collection of poetry titled Jagah Jaisi Jagah.

== See also ==
- List of Indian writers
