= Tokyo Ueno Station (novel) =

2014 novel by Miri Yu

- First edition cover (Kawade Shobō Shinsha, 2014)
- Author: Yū Miri
- Original title: JR Ueno-Eki Kōenguchi (JR上野駅公園口)
- Translator: Morgan Giles
- Language: Japanese
- Set in: Tokyo
- Publisher: Kawade Shobō Shinsha
- Publication date: 2014
- Publication place: Japan
- English publication date: 2019
- Awards: National Book Award for Translated Literature (2020)

Tokyo Ueno Station (Japanese: JR上野駅公園口, Hepburn: JR Ueno-Eki Kōenguchi) is a 2014 novel by Zainichi Korean author Yū Miri.

The novel reflects the author's engagement with historical memory and margins by incorporating themes of a migrant laborer from northeastern Japan and his work on Olympic construction sites in Tokyo, as well as the 11 March 2011 disaster. In November 2020, Tokyo Ueno Station won the National Book Award for Translated Literature for the English translation by translator Morgan Giles.

== Reception ==
In its starred review, Kirkus Reviews called it Yu's "more restrained and mature novel" and praised her fusion of "personal and national history."

Lauren Elkin of The Guardian wrote that the novel "most effectively conveys its concerns through dense layers of narrative, through ambiguity rather than specific fates."
