= Prafull Shiledar =

Indian Marathi-language poet

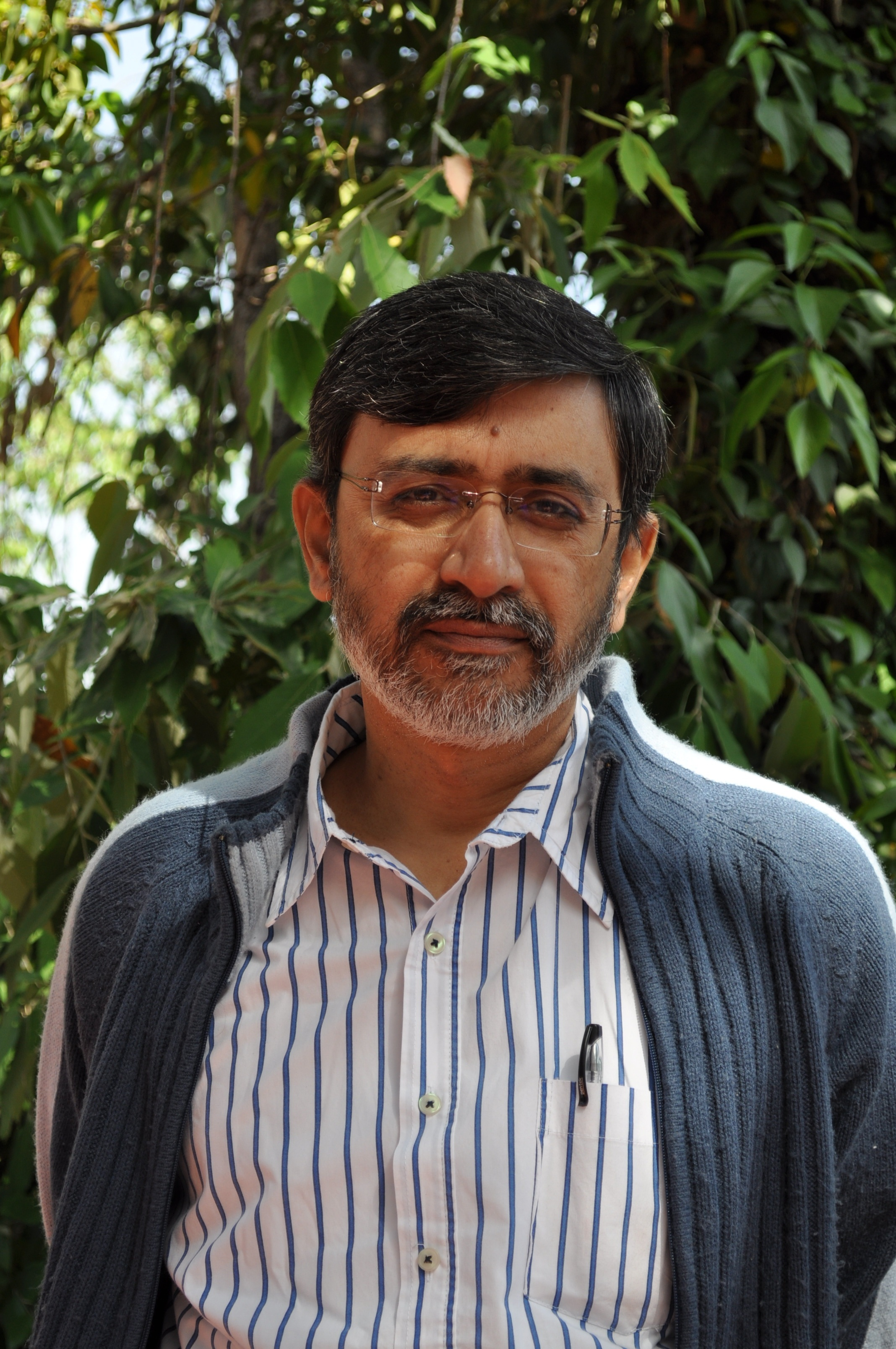
- Prafull Shiledar
- Born: June 30, 1962 (age 64)
- Occupation: Poet
- Known for: Poetry in Marathi language

Prafull Shiledar (born 30 June 1962) is an Indian poet. He has four poetry collections in Marathi, two in Hindi, one in Kannada, one in Odia, six edited books and six translated books. He has written prose on socio-literary issues. Along with this, he has translated poetry from Indian languages and poetry from Europe, America and Latin America.

His poems have been translated into Indian languages including Hindi, English, Malayalam, Kannada, Telugu, Manipuri, Gujarati, Nepali, Odia, Punjabi, Dakhani and into foreign languages including Slovak, Turkish & German. His poems are included in national and international poetry anthologies. His poetry is in the academic syllabus of Indian universities.

Shiledar has participated in poetry readings at literary festivals and events in India, Europe, the US and the Middle East. He was invited for poetry reading at the 11th Ars Poetica Festival, Bratislava, Slovakia. He was invited as a fellow writer in the international writer's residency program by Art Omi, New York, in spring 2025.

His poetry and translations have received many awards, including the Maharashtra State award (Keshavsut Award) for best poetry collection and the Sahitya Akademi Translation Award (2018).

Shiledar is currently the editor of one of the oldest Marathi literary quarterlies, Yugvani.

== Poetry ==
- Swagat (A Monologue) (1993) by Anjani Publications, Pune
- Jagnyachya Pasaryat (In the disarray of living) (2006), by Popular Prakashan, Mumbai
- Payee Chalnar (will walk) (2017, 2021, 2024) Popular Prakashan, Mumbai
- Haravalelya Vastucha Mithak (Myth of the lost thing) 2023, Popular Prakashan, Mumbai

=== Poetry collection In English Translation ===
- Scratching the Silence (2025) published by Red River, New Delhi

=== Poetry collection in other languages ===
- Paidal Chalunga (2016) Hindi -by Sahitya Bhandar, Prayagraj
- Samudra Par Dastak (2023) Hindi – by Setu Prakashan, Delhi
- Atmakathe Bareyuva Munna – Selected Poems - (2023) Kannada – Translated by Chandrakant Pokale & published by Anandi Prakashana, Mysuru
- Samudrare Karaghaat (2025) Published by Dhauli Books, Bhubaneshwar

=== Prose writing ===
- Yerzara: Collected non fiction along with some poetry translations, published by Papyrus Publications, Mumbai (2025)

=== Books translated by Prafull Shiledar ===
- Pul Nasleli Nadi (A river without bridge) Malayalam Short stories of Manasi published by Manovikas Publications, Pune – (2009), Vijay Prakashan, Nagpur – (2023)
- Jastiche Nahi (No Extras) Poetry of Hindi Poet Vinod Kumar Shukla published by Popular Publications, Mumbai – 2013
- Sanshayatma (Disbeliever) Poetry of Hindi Poet Gyanendra Pati published by Sahitya Akademi, New Delhi – 2013
- Dagad Bhirakavu Lagaloy (throwing the stones) Hindi poems of Chandrakant Deotale – 2019
- Kewal Kahi Vakya (Only few sentences) Hindi Poems of Udayan Vajpeyee (2023)
- Dusara na Koni (No one else) Hindi poems of Kunwar Narain (2025) Many uncollected translations of Indian and foreign language poets published in various journals.
- Many uncollected translations of Indian and foreign language poets published in various journals.

=== Edited Books and Journals ===
- Adivasi Sahitya ani Asmitavedh – collected prose writing of noted poet and tribal activist late Bhujang Meshram; published by Lokvangmay Gruha, Mumbai (2014, 2022)
- Arun Kolatkar – Criticism on renowned poet Arun Kolatkar published by Majestic Prakashan, Mumbai (2024)
- Satya, Satta ani Sahitya – Non fiction writing of Jayant Pawar (Co-editing) (2024)
- Sandhyasukte (2014) and Shubhavartaman (2017)poetry by N. W. Gokhale published by Maharashtra Grantha Bhandar, Pune and Sachin Sahitya, Nagpur
- Editor of quarterly literary Marathi journal 'Yugvani' since April 2018 till date, published by Vidarbha Sahitya Sangh, Nagpur

=== Translations of his Poems ===
- The English translations are published in Indian Literature – July / August 2012 & Sep-Oct 2023 issues (published by Sahitya Akademi, New Delhi), The Little Magazine (Editor Antara Deb Sen)(New Delhi), The Journal of Literature and Aesthetics (International Peer-Reviewed Journal) published from Kollam, Kerala and on various web journals like PoetryIndia.com etc.
- English translations of poems are published in anthologies published by The Poet Magazine, UK (Autumn 2021, Winter 2021, Summer 2021, Spring 2021, Spring 2022, Winter 2022)
- English translations of poems are published on PoetryHunter
- English translations published in Muse India July–August 2023 issue and Jan-Feb 2024 issue.
- Slovak Translations of poems are published in the literary journal VLNA published from Bratislava, Slovakia (issue No. 55 – 2013) and also in Festival Anthology of Ars Poetica 2013
- Turkish Translations: Turkish Translations by Ozge Cengiz published in quarterly literary journal Virus Oct-Nov-Dec 2021
- Hindi Translations are published in various literary journals like Pahal, Alochana, Sakshatkar, Udbhavana, Banas Jan, Samakalin Bharatiya Sahitya, Pragatisheel Vasudha, Weekly Shukravar, Vagarth, Lokmat Samachar etc. and on web journals viz Samalochan, Hindisamay.com etc.
- Poems are translated and published in other Indian & foreign languages including Kannada, Malayalam, Manipuri, Punjabi, Telugu, Gujrati, Nepali, Odiya, Dakhani, Slovak, Turkish in literary journals
- Translation of poems in 22 Indian languages was broadcast over the nation on eve of Republic Day of India by All India Radio
- Translation in English on PoetryIndia

=== Poems in Anthologies ===
- Drushyantar Published by National Book Trust, India (Anthology of Post Independence Marathi poetry containing poems of 50 poets from period 1947 – 2007) edited by Dr. Chandrakant Patil (2007)
- Marathi Poetry 1975 – 2000 Anthology of Marathi poetry in English published by Sahitya Akademi, New Delhi translated and edited by Dr. Santosh Bhoomkar (2013)
- India in Verse – Contemporary poetry from 20 Indian languages edited by Antara Dev Sen published by The Little Magazine, New Delhi Volume 8 issue 6 – (2011)
- Live Update - Anthology in English translated and edited by Dr. Sachin Ketkar published by Poetrywala, Mumbai (2005)
- Ars Poetica Festival Anthology of 25 poets from various nations around globe participating in 11th Ars Poetica International Poetry Festival, Bratislava, Slovakia (2013)
- Gati Pragati Contemporary Marathi Literature translated and published in Hindi by Sahitya Bhandar Publications, Allahabad, India edited by Dr. Chandrakant Patil (2006)
- Swatantryottar Marathi Kavita (Post Independence Marathi poetry) edited by Dr. Anil Nitnavre published by Vijay Prakashan, Nagpur (2015)
- VAK-2017 Festival Anthology published by Raza Foundation, Delhi
- Marathi Kavita Ka Samakaal edited by Prakash Bhatambrekar (2018)
- Poetry anthologies published by The Poet Magazine, UK (Autumn 2021, Winter 2021, Summer 2021, Spring 2021, Spring 2022, Winter 2022)
- 'Kaav Dishavaan' – Anthology of Indian poetry in Punjabi edited by Tarsem, Satpal Bhikhi, Gurdeep Singh and published by Caliber Publications, Patiala.(Jan 2022)
- Kavita Ke Saye Mein Shabd – Anthology of Marathi poetry in Hindi edited by Sunil Deodhar, published by M.S. Hindi Akademi, Mumbai (2024)
- Scent of Rain – Edited by Ashwani Kumar, published by Red River, New Delhi (2025)

=== Poetry reading ===
- Solo Poetry Reading organized by Sahitya Akademi in programme 'Kavi Sandhi' in Mumbai (2020)
- Poetry reading organized by Sahitya Akademi – The National Academy of Letters in Mumbai, Pune, Ujjain, Delhi etc. on various occasions
- Poetry reading organized by National Book Trust at Mumbai (2013) and other places
- Poetry reading at Kala Ghoda Arts Festival, Mumbai in 2012, 2013, 2016, Vishwaranga Festival, Bhopal (2023), Kadambini Festival, Bhubaneshwar (2023), Kerala Literature Festival, Kochi, Imphal literature Festival, Imphal, Manipur, (2022), TATA Literature festival, Mumbai (2021)
- Poetry reading at 11th Ars Poetica International Poetry Festival, Bratislava, Slovakia 17 to 21 October 2013
- Poetry reading at Department of Indology, Charles University, Prague, Czech Republic (Oct 2013)
- Poetry reading and interaction along with American poets at Riverside Writers Chapter, Poetry Society of Virginia, Fairfax, USA and Poets Anonymous, Washington DC, USA during personal visit to USA in 2003
- Poetry reading in World Marathi Literature Festival - Dubai 2010
- Poetry reading in Hindi in Banaras Hindu University (Muktibodh Centenary - 2016), VAK-2017 Poetry Biennale Organised by Raza Foundation, Delhi, Dehli Sahitya Parishad, Delhi, Mussouri, Bhopal, Raipur, Puri, Bhubaneswar etc.
- Poetry reading in Allahabad Janvadi Lekhak Sangha (2023)
- Poetry reading in Bharat Bhavan, Bhopal (2023), Bharatiya Vidya Bhavan, Mumbai (2023)
- Poetry reading in Chandrabhaga Poetry Festival, Konark (2025)
- Poetry reading organized by Art Omi, New York and John Asbery Resource Centre, Flow Chart Foundations, Hudson, New York (6th April 2025)
- Poetry reading at Albany, USA and Los Angeles, USA in private circles (2025)

=== Other publications ===
- Short stories, interviews, Literary criticism, book reviews, reports, features, film appreciations, travelogue, column writing etc. in various Marathi periodicals. His Hindi critical essays are also published in Hindi journals and anthologies.
- Article in Hindi about Marathi author Bhalchandra Nemade

=== Awards ===
- Sahitya Akademi Translation Award 2018 for translated poetry book Sanshayatma by Gyanendra Pati.
- (News: Sahitya Akademi Translation Prize - 2018)
- Vishakha Award by Yashwantrao Chavan Maharashtra Mukta Vidyapeeth, (Open University), Nasik for the poetry book Swagat
- 'Keshawsut' Award for best poetry book of the year by the State of Maharashtra to the poetry book Jagnyachya Pasaryat (2006)
- 'Sharadchandra Muktibodh' Award by Vidarbha Sahitya Sangh, Nagpur to the book Jagnyachya Pasaryat (2006)
- Translation Award by Gandhi Smarak Nidhi, Nagpur for the translation book Pul Nasleli Nadi (2009)
- Balshastri Jambhekar Translation Award by Sane Guruji National Memorial Trust, Mumbai for the book Sanshayatma (2014)
- Marvadi Foundation Literature Award, Mumbai 2017 for literary contribution
- Lokmangal Award, Solapur 2018 for poetry book 'Payee Chalnar'
- Barashiv Sahitya Puraskar, Parbhani 2018 for poetry book 'Payee Chalnar'
- Kavivarya Keshavsut Award 2021 for poetry writing by Marathvada Sahitya Parishad, Aurangabaad
- Vikhe Patil Puraskar, Pravaranagar for poetry book 'Haravalelya Vastucha Mithak' (2024)

=== Honors ===
- He was a fellow writer in the International Writers Residency Programme at Art Omi, New York in Spring 2025
- He was invited for poetry reading in 11th Ars Poetica International Poetry Festival, Bratislava, Slovakia in 2013
- Poet of Honor for the Republic day 2013 in National Convention of poets (2013) representing Marathi language. His poem was translated into 22 official languages of India and was broadcast from all radio stations of India on eve of Republic Day
- He is a judge for the Bharatiya Jnanpith Award since 2024. He has also worked as a judge for some other prestigious awards.
- He has presided over fourth Samaj Sahitya Vichar Sammelan at Malvan in 2024.
- His poetry is included in the academic syllabus of languages in many Indian universities.
