= Budi Darma =

Indonesian writer (1937–2021)

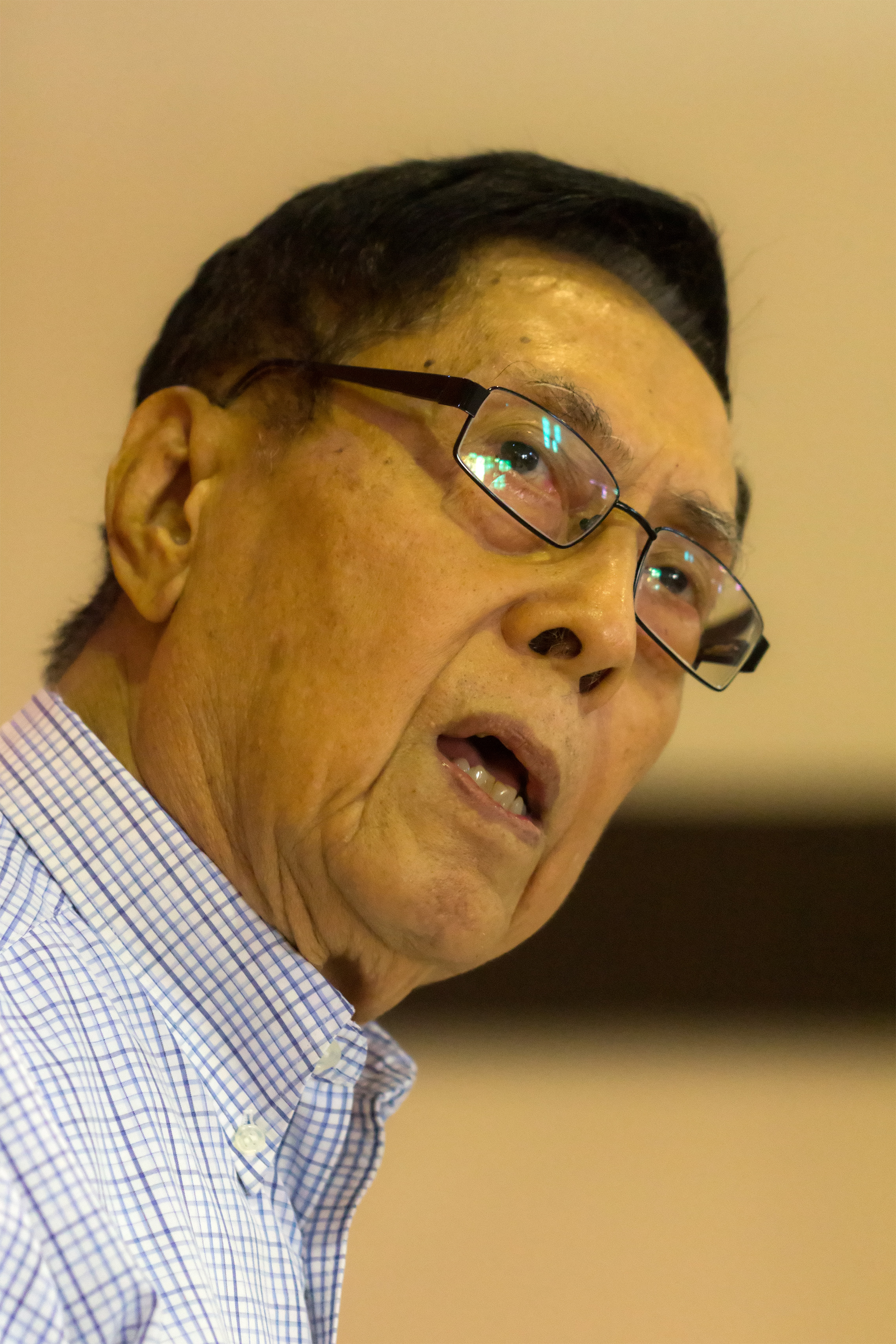
- Darma in 2018
- Born: 25 April 1937; Rembang, Central Java, Java, Indonesia
- Died: 21 August 2021 (aged 84); Surabaya, East Java, Java, Indonesia
- Occupations: Essayist, Novelist, Literary Critic, Literature Professor

Budi Darma (25 April 1937 – 21 August 2021) was an Indonesian writer, essayist, and academic.

== Early life ==
Budi is the fourth of six children, all male. During his childhood and teens, Budi and his family lived in a number of different cities in Java, including Yogyakarta, Bandung and Semarang, due to the nature of his father's position in the postal service. His schooling reflected his family's nomadic existence. Budi attended elementary school in Kudus, junior high in Salatiga, and high school in Semarang, graduating from there in 1957. He then studied at the English Literature Department, Faculty of Letters, University of Gadjah Mada. After graduating in 1963, Budi moved to Iowa for the International Writing Program at the University of Iowa. In 1970, he received a scholarship from the East-West Center to study humanities at the University of Hawaii, before graduating with an MA from Indiana University Bloomington in 1976. Four years later, in 1980, he earned his Ph.D. for his dissertation on "Character and Moral Judgment in Jane Austen's Novels", from the same university.

== Academia ==
Budi's return to Indonesia was followed by a succession of notable appointments: between the years 1984-1987 he was appointed Dean of the English Department of the State University of Surabaya (formerly IKIP Surabaya), became a member of the Arts Council, and Rector of the Surabaya Teachers' Training College. Budi Darma continued lecturing at the English Department of the State University of Surabaya until his retirement, at the age of 70, in 2007.

== Literary works ==
Budi is often described as one of Indonesia's most influential writers. In 1983 Budi wrote the novel, Olenka. It was his first novel, inspired by a woman he met while studying at Bloomington. The title was taken from a collection of short stories by Anton Chekov. Although set in America, the novel remains steadfastly Indonesian in its use of Javanese wordplay to tell the story of an amorous plight of a young man with Olenka, the female heroine. Budi has explained his reasons for his choice of style as being due to his firm belief that a writer will never lose his or her roots, no matter how distanced from their place of birth. The novel was published by Balai Pustaka and went on to win several awards including the Jakarta Art Institute Literary award and the S.E.A. Write Award (Southeast Asian Write award). Olenka has been reprinted several times, the most recent reprinting coincided with the Indonesian Book Festival in Senayan, Central Jakarta in 2009.

Although Olenka is his best known work, Budi was also the author of several novels, a number of collections of short stories and essays. Prior to writing Olenka, he published an anthology of eight short stories, called Orang-orang Bloomington (Bloomington People) (published 1980). After Olenka, he wrote the novels Rafilus, published in 1988, and Ny. Talis, published in 1996. As of 2010, Budi Darma had authored over 38 works, many of which are available in translation worldwide.

== Death ==
Budi died on 21 August 2021, at the age of 84, from COVID-19 during the COVID-19 pandemic in Indonesia.

== Accolades ==
- S.E.A. Write Award (Thailand) (1984)
- Indonesian Government Arts Award (1993)
- The Best Story Writer of 1999 (1999)
- Satya Lencana Kebudayaan (2003)
- Achmad Bakrie Award (2005) Freedom Institute
- Mastera Literary Award (Brunei) (2011)
- The Best Story Writer of 2012 (2012)
- Most Dedicated Intellectuals of 2013 (2013)

== Notable works ==
=== Book ===
- Pengantar Teori Sastra (2005)
- Pengantar Teori Sastra (2019)

=== Novel ===
- Olenka (1983)
- Rafilus (1988)
- Ny.Talis (1995)

=== Short story ===
- Derabat (1977)
- Kecap Nomor Satu di Sekeliling Bayi (1969)
- Ranjang (1970)
- Nancy Krie (1970)
- Tanah Minta Digarap (1970)
- Mangut-Mangut Semacam Ini Biasakah (1970)
- Mbah Jambe (1970)
- Pistol (1970)
- Bulan (1973)
- Kitri (1970)
- Pengantin (1971)
- Sebelum Esok Tiba (1971)
- Gadis (1971)
- Anak (1972)
- Alang Kepalang (1976)
- Gauhati (1984)
- Madelun (1993)
- Mata yang Indah (2001)
- Kisah Pilot Bejo (2007)
- Bluke Kecil (2009)
- Misbahul (2010)
- Pohon Jejawi (2010)
- Laki-laki Pemanggul Goni (2012)
- Tangan-tangan Buntung (2012)
- Dua Sahabat (2013)
- Percakapan (2013)
- Tanda Tanya (2013)
- Angela (2014)
- Hotel Tua (2014)
- Sang Pemahat (2015)
- Dua Penyanyi (2015)
- Presiden Jebule (2016)
- Darojat dan Istrinya (2016)
- Tukang Cukur (2016)
- Bukan Mahasiswa Saya (2017)
- Tarom (2017)
- Suara di Bandara (2018)
- Lorong Gelap (2018)
- Tamu (2019)

=== Short story anthology ===
- Orang-orang Bloomington (1980)
- Kritikus Adinan (2002)
- Fofo & Senggring (2005)
- Orez
- Laki-laki Lain dalam Sepucuk Surat: pilihan cerita (2008)

=== Essay ===
- Sebuah Solilokui mengenai Goenawan Mohamad (1977)
- Pengaruh Zionisme atas Sastra Dunia (1978)
- Sastra Amerika Masa Kini (1979)
- Beberapa Gejala dalam Penulisan Prosa (1983)
- Keindahan: Pandangan Romantik (1983)
- Novel Indonesia adalah Dunia Melodrama (1983)
- Persoalan Proses Kreatif (1983)
- Kemampuan Mengebor Sukma (1984)
- Perihal Kritik Sastra (1984)
- Kritikus Nirdawat: Seorang Kritikus Sastra (1985)
- Pengalaman Pribadi dengan Nugraho Notosusastro (1985)
- Perkembangan Puisi Indonesia (1985)
- Manusia Indonesia Berbicara (1987)
- Kritik Sastra dan Karya Sastra (1987)
- Romantika Sastra, Kita (1988)
- Tanggung Jawab Pengarang (1988)
- Konstalasi Sastra : Homo Comparatikus (1989)
- Melihat Citra Bangsa melalui Novel (1990)
- Sastra Indonesia Mutakhir (1990)
- Stagnasi Kritik Sastra (1990)
- Kisah Sebuah Odise (1991)
- Sastra dan Kebudayaan (1992)
- Novel dan Jati Diri (1993)
- Manusia Konotasi dan Manusia Denotasi (1997)
- Mempersoalkan Cerita Pendek (1999)
- Jebakan Rogue Journals (2019)
- Jebakan Rouque Journals (2019)
- Jebakan Roque Jurnals (2019)
- Dalang Wayang Kulit (2000)
- Pendidikan Seni Pertunjukan (2000)
- Suratman Markasan : Sastra Melayu Singapura (2000)
- Fiksi dan Biografi (2001)
- Ironi si Kembar Siam : Tentang Posmo dan Kajian Budaya (2001)
- Manusia sebagai Makhluk Budaya (2001)
- Sastra dan Kebangsaan (2001)
- Sastra dan Pluralisme (2001)
- Visi Pengembangan Kebudayaan (2001)
- Memperhitungkan Masa Lampau (2004)
- Bahasa yang Indah (2012)
- Mempertanyakan Orhan Pamuk (2012)
- Penulisan Sejarah Indonesia (2014)
- Tersandera oleh Wibawa (2015)
- Ketika Lapis Atas dan Bawah Sama-sama Timpang (2015)
- Berdoa Kepada Tuhan (2016)

=== Essay anthology ===
- Solilokui (1983)
- Sejumlah Esai Sastra (1984)
- Harmonium (1995)
- Moral dalam Sastra (1981)
- Art and Culture in Surabaya: A Brief Introduction (1992)

=== Translation ===
The Legacy (1996)

=== Non-Literature ===
- Sejarah 10 November 1945 (1987, Pemda Jatim)
- Culture in Surabaya (1992, IKIP Surabaya)
- Modern Literature of ASEAN (Chief Editor, 2000)
- Kumpulan Esai Sastra ASEAN Asean Committee on Culture and Information
