= Hwang Jung-eun =

South Korean writer (born 1976)

Hwang Jung Eun
- Born: 1976 (age 49–50)
- Writing career
- Language: Korean

Korean name
- Hangul: 황정은
- RR: Hwang Jeongeun
- MR: Hwang Chŏngŭn

Hwang Jung Eun (Korean: 황정은; born 1976) is a South Korean writer and podcast celebrity.

== Life ==
Hwang was born in Seoul, South Korea. She dropped out of Incheon National University. Hwang learned Korean at a younger age than most kids and was skilled in learning new words (Kyeonggi Ilbo). She started writing books after her short story "Mother" was selected in the Novel Field of 2005 Kyunghyang Sinmun Annual Spring Literary Contest.

== Work ==
After her debut, Hwang won the 2010 Hanguk Ilbo Literature Award. Her work "Into the World of Passi" won the Shin Dong Yeob Literature award in 2013.

Hwang hosted two podcasts. One was the "Author's Room" section of the 2012 Sound of Munjang and the other one was “Radio Book Dabang” from January 2013 to May 2015. Her latest book is Let Me Continue. Hwang's work Kong’s Garden was translated into English by Asia Publisher. She was one of four featured speakers at a bilingual author's roundtable in Myeongdong Seoul on September 12, 2015.

Korean Literature Now Magazine sums up Hwang's work:

Hwang perceptively portrays the pain of those living in a space that cannot possibly be represented by the word “slum,” a space always in danger of falling into ruin. She illustrates the fiery trace of lives that cannot be compensated for, and life’s suffering that cannot be converted into money. The stories from her collection The Seven Thirty-two Elephant Train also depict the marginalized pushed out to the edge of the city lines. Her stories lend voice to the small, frail voices drowned out by the extravagant noise of the city and the groaning of the masses barely audible under the sound of cell phones and TVs—voices so painful to hear that one is tempted to cover the ears. Her stories contain these disappearing voices. Hwang Jung-eun’s novels are an open-mic rally for the homeless and the abandoned children.

== Awards ==
- 2010 Hanguk Ilbo Literary Award: One hundred Shadows
- 2012 Shin Dong-yep Literature Award: "Mr. Pah's Introduction"
- 2013 The Young Authors Prize: "Eagles In The Upper Stream"
- 2015 Daesan Literature Award: I'll Go On
- 2017 Kim Yujung Literature Award: The man who laughs

== Works in Korean (partial) ==
=== Novels ===
- One Hundred Shadows (百의 그림자, 민음사, 2010) Translated as One hundred shadows, Tilted Axis Press, 2016
- Barbaric Mr. Alice(야만적인 앨리스씨, 문학동네, 2013)
- I'll Go On (계속해보겠습니다, 창비, 2014) Translated as I'll go on, Tilted Axis Press, 2018
- dd's Umbrella (디디의 우산, 2019) Translated as dd's Umbrella, Tilted Axis Press, 2025

=== Short story/novel collections ===
- The Seven Thirty-two Elephant Train (일곱시 삼십이분 코끼리열차, 문학동네, 2008)
- Mr. Pah's Introduction (파씨의 입문, 창비, 2012)
- Being Nobody (아무도 아닌, 문학동네, 2016) Includes short story, Kong's future, translated as Kong's Garden, Asia Publishers, 2015

== Translation in English ==
=== Novels ===
- Kong's Garden (Asia Publishers, 2015)
- One Hundred Shadows (Tilted Axis Press, 2016)
- I'll Go on (Tilted Axis Press, 2018)
- Year After Year (Open Letter, 2024)
