= Shashi Deshpande =

Indian writer (born 1938)

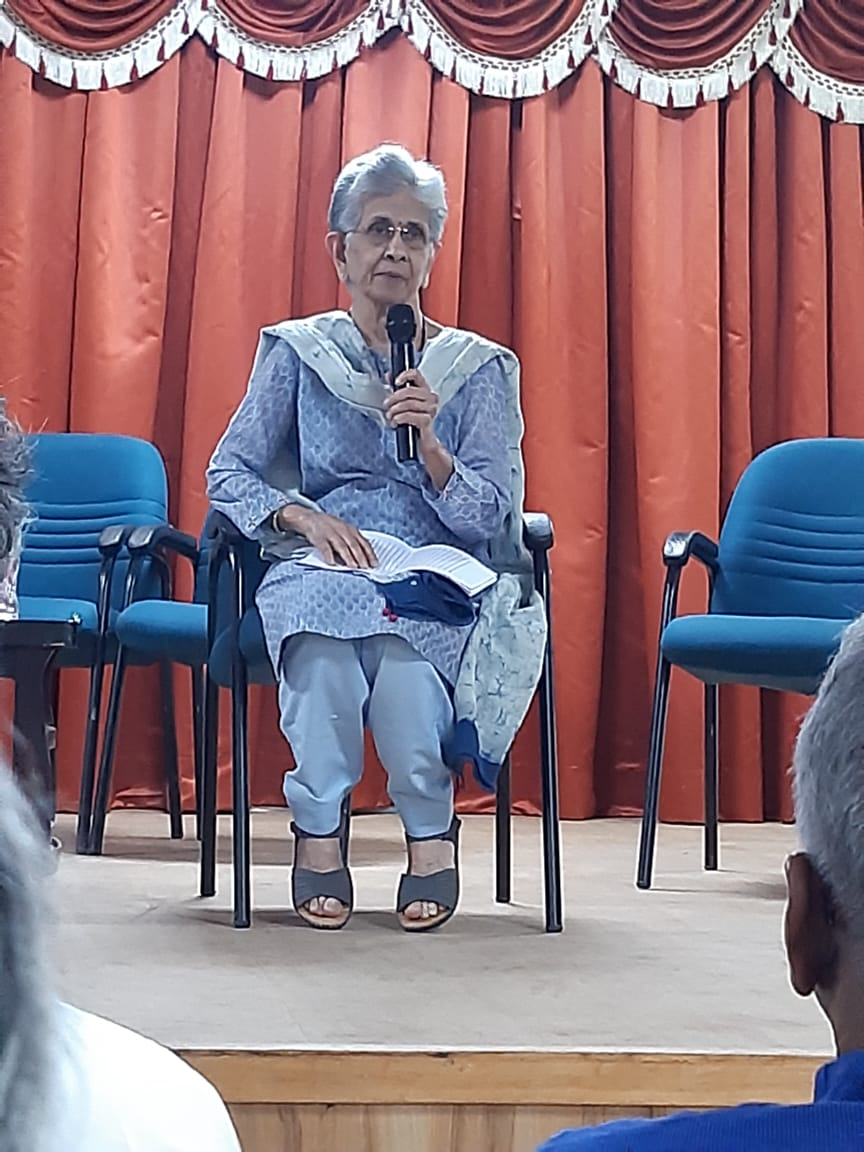
- Deshpande in 2020
- Born: 1938 (age 87–88)
- Writing career
- Notable awards: Sahitya Akademi Award (1990); Padma Shri (2009)

Shashi Deshpande (born 1938) is an Indian novelist. She is a recipient of the Sahitya Akademi Award and the Padma Shri Award in 1990 and 2009 respectively.

== Biography ==
She was born on 19 august 1938 in Dharwad, Karnataka, the second daughter of the Kannada dramatist and writer Adya Rangacharya and Sharada Adya. She was educated in Bombay (now Mumbai) and Bangalore. Deshpande has degrees in Economics and Law. In Mumbai, she studied journalism at the Vidya Bhavan and worked for a few months as a journalist for the magazine 'Onlooker'. She informally adapted Scenes from a Marriage (1973) by Ingmar Bergman into the screenplay for Govind Nihalani's Drishti in 1990.

She published her first collection of short stories in 1978, and her first novel, 'The Dark Holds No Terror', in 1980. She won the Sahitya Akademi Award for the novel That Long Silence in 1990 and the Padma Shri award in 2009. Her novel Shadow Play was shortlisted for The Hindu Literary Prize in 2014.

Deshpande has written four children’s books, a number of short stories, thirteen novels, and an essay collection entitled Writing from the Margin and Other Essays.

On 9 December 2015, she resigned from her position in the Sahitya Akademi's general council and returned her Sahitya Akademi award. In doing so, she joined a broader protest by other writers against the Akademi's perceived inaction and silence on the murder of M. M. Kalburgi.

On 6 December 2018, during her inaugural address of the ninth edition of the Goa Arts and Literature Festival (GALF), Deshpande urged Indians to think about the consequences of wanting a Hindu nation, and reminded those present of the violence and carnage that had been caused by the India-Pakistan partition.

== Selected bibliography ==
- The Dark Holds No Terrors, Penguin Books India (1980), ISBN 0-14-014598-2
- If I Die Today (1982)
- Come Up and Be Dead (1983)
- Roots and Shadows (1983)
- That Long Silence, Penguin (paperback 1989), ISBN 0-14-012723-2
- The Intrusion and Other Stories (1993)
- A Matter of Time, The Feminist Press at CUNY (1996), ISBN 1-55861-264-5
- The Binding Vine, The Feminist Press at CUNY (2002), ISBN 1-55861-402-8
- Small Remedies, Penguin India (2000), ISBN 978-0-14-029487-3
- Moving On, Penguin Books India (2004), ISBN 978-0-670-05781-8
- In the Country of Deceit, Penguin/Viking (2008), ISBN 978-0-670-08198-1
- Shadow Play, Aleph (2013), ISBN 978-9-382-27719-4
- Strangers to Ourselves, HarperCollins (2015), ISBN 978-9-351-77634-5

Children's books

- A Summer Adventure
- The Hidden Treasure
- The Only Witness
- The Narayanpur Incident

=== Memoir ===
- Listen to Me

=== Collected Essays ===
- Writing from the Margin & Other Essays, Penguin (2003), ISBN 0-67-004996-4
- Subversions: Essays on Life and Literature, Context (2021), ISBN 978-93-91234-57-7
