= Shrilal Shukla =

Hindi writer (1925–2011)

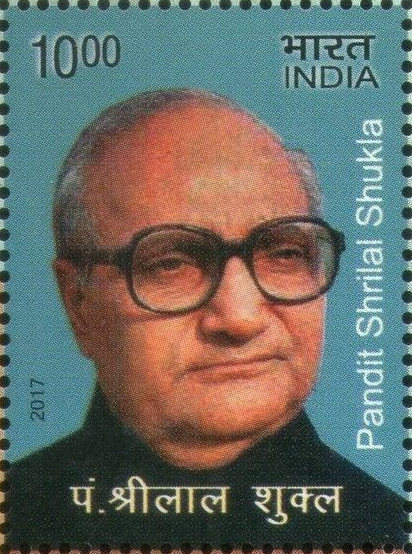
- Shrilal Shukla on a 2017 stamp of India
- Born: 31 December 1925
- Died: 28 October 2011 (aged 85); Lucknow, Uttar Pradesh
- Occupation: Writer
- Writing career
- Notable works: Raag Darbari, Makaan, Sooni Ghaati Ka Sooraj, Pehla Padaav

Signature
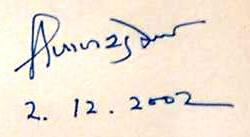

Shrilal Shukla (31 December 1925 – 28 October 2011) was a Hindi writer, notable for his satire. He worked as a PCS officer for the state government of Uttar Pradesh, later inducted into the IAS. He has written over 25 books, including Raag Darbari, Makaan, Sooni Ghaati Ka Sooraj, Pehla Padaav and Bisrampur Ka Sant.

Shukla has highlighted the falling moral values in the Indian society in the post independence era through his novels. His writings expose the negative aspects of life in rural and urban India in a satirical manner. His best known work Raag Darbari has been translated into English and 15 Indian languages. A television serial based on this continued for several months on the national network in the 1980s. It is a little-known fact that he also wrote a detective novel entitled Aadmi Ka Zahar which was serialised in the weekly magazine 'Hindustan'.

== Awards ==
Shukla received the Jnanpith Award, the highest Indian literary award, in 2011. His first major award was the Sahitya Akademi Award for his novel Raag Darbari in 1969. He received the Vyas Samman award in 1999 for the novel Bisrampur ka Sant. In 2008, he was awarded the Padma Bhushan by the President of India for his contribution to Indian literature and culture. On his 80th birthday in December 2005, his friends, peers, family and fans organised a literary and cultural event in New Delhi. To mark the occasion, a volume titled Shrilal Shukla – Jeevan Hi Jeevan was issued about him. This contains the writings of eminent literary personalities such as Dr. Naamvar Singh, Rajendra Yadav, Ashok Bajpai, Doodhnath Singh, Nirmala Jain, Leeladhar Jagudi, Gillian Wright, Kunwar Narayan and Raghuvir Sahay among others. His friends, family and fans also contributed to the book.

== Personal account ==
- 1925 – Born in village Atrauli in Mohanlalganj, Lucknow district of Uttar Pradesh
- 1947 – Graduated from Allahabad University
- 1949 – Entry into the Civil Service
- 1957 – First novel Sooni Ghaati Ka Sooraj published
- 1958 – First collection of satire Angad Ka Paanv published
- 1970 – Awarded the Sahitya Akademi Award for Raag Darbari (for 1969)
- 1978 – Awarded the Madhya Pradesh Hindi Sahitya Parishad Award for Makaan
- 1979–80 – Served as Director of the Bhartendu Natya Academy, Uttar Pradesh
- 1981 – Represented India at the International Writers' Meet in Belgrade
- 1982–86 – Member of the Advisory Board of the Sahitya Akademi
- 1983 – Retirement from the Indian Administrative Service
- 1987–90 – Awarded the Emeritus Fellowship by the ICCR, Government of India
- 1988 – Given the Sahitya Bhushan Award by Uttar Pradesh Hindi Sansthaan
- 1991 – Awarded the Goyal Sahitya Puraskaar by Kurukshetra University
- 1994 – Awarded the Lohia Sammaan by Uttar Pradesh Hindi Sansthaan
- 1996 – Awarded the Sharad Joshi Sammaan by the Madhya Pradesh Government
- 1997 – Awarded the Maithili Sharan Gupta Sammaan by the Madhya Pradesh Government
- 1999 – Awarded the Vyas Samman by the Birla Foundation
- 2005 – Awarded the Yash Bharati Samman by the Uttar Pradesh Government
- 2008 – Awarded the Padma Bhushan by the president of India
- 2009 – Awarded the Jnanpith Award.

== Literary works ==
Novels

- Sooni Ghaati Ka Sooraj – 1957
- Agyaatvaas – 1962
- Raag Darbari (novel) – 1968 – original is in Hindi; an English translation was published under the same title in 1993 by Penguin Books; also translated and published by National Book Trust, India in 15 Indian languages. The novelist had long discussions with his close friend Surendra Chaturvedi of Nav Bharat Times concerning the plot, characters and language of the novel.
- Aadmi Ka Zahar – 1972
- Seemayein Tootati Hain – 1973
- Makaan – 1976 – original is in Hindi; a Bengali translation was published in the late 1970s.
- Pehla Padaav – 1987 – original is in Hindi; an English translation was published as Opening Moves by Penguin International in 1993.
- Bisrampur Ka Sant – 1998
- Babbar Singh Aur Uske Saathi – 1999 – original is in Hindi; an English translation was published as Babbar Singh And his Friends in 2000 by Scholastic Inc. New York.
- Raag Viraag – 2001

Satires

- Angad Ka Paanv – 1958
- Yahaan Se Vahaan – 1970
- Meri Shreshtha Vyangya Rachnayein – 1979
- Umraaonagar Mein Kuchh Din – 1986
- Kuchh Zameen Mein Kuchh Hava Mein – 1990
- Aao Baith Lein Kuchh Der – 1995
- Agli Shataabdi Ka Sheher – 1996
- Jahaalat Ke Pachaas Saal – 2003
- Khabron Ki Jugaali – 2005

Short Story Collections

- Yeh Ghar Mera Nahin – 1979
- Suraksha Tatha Anya Kahaaniyan – 1991
- Iss Umra Mein – 2003
- Dus Pratinidhi Kahaaniyan – 2003

Memoirs

- Mere Saakshaatkaar – 2002
- Kuchh Saahitya Charcha Bhi – 2008

Literary Critique

- Bhagwati Charan Varma – 1989
- Amritlal Naagar – 1994
- Agyeya: Kuchh Rang Kuchh Raag – 1999

Edited Works

- Hindi Haasya Vyangya Sankalan – 2000

== Literary travels ==
He has visited Yugoslavia, Germany, UK, Poland, Surinam for various literary seminars, conferences and to receive awards. He has also headed a delegation of writers sent by the Government of India to China.

== Family ==
Shukla died in Lucknow on 28 October 2011 at around 11.45 am after a prolonged illness, fourteen years after the death of his wife Girija, who had been his true companion who passionately shared his love of classical music and literature. Shri Lal Shukla has four children – daughters Rekha Awasthi and Madhulika Mehta who are musically talented homemakers;son Ashutosh Shukla who works in a corporate cooperative concern and lastly youngest daughter Dr. Vinita Mathur who is a professor in Geography in the University of Delhi. He has eight grandchildren and five great-grandchildren.

== See also ==
- List of Indian writers
