= Raag Darbari (novel) =

Novel by Sri Lal Sukla

- Author: Sri Lal Sukla
- Translator: Gillian Wright
- Language: Hindi
- Publisher: Penguin Books Ltd (Translation)
- Publication date: 1968
- Publication place: India
- Media type: Print
- ISBN: 81-267-0478-0 (First edition)
- OCLC: 28387263

Raag Darbari is a satirical Hindi novel written by Sri Lal Sukla, published in 1968. He was awarded the Sahitya Academy Award, the highest Indian literary award, in 1969 for this novel.

The novel illustrates the failing values present in post-Independence Indian society. It exposes the helplessness of intellectuals in the face of a strong and corrupt nexus between criminals, businessmen, police and politicians.

The novel is narrated from the point of view of Ranganath, a research student in history, who comes to live with his uncle, Vaidyaji, in the fictional village of Shivpalganj in Uttar Pradesh for a few months. He learns how his uncle uses all the village institutions—the village school, the village panchayat (a local elected body), the local government offices for his political purpose. The conduct of his uncle and the petty village politicians is in stark contrast to the ideals that Ranganath has learnt to aspire to during his university education. The villagers take pride in calling themselves "ganjahe", originating from "ganj" (which means "place" in Hindi) of Shivpalganj.

== Backdrop ==
Shrilal Shukla portrays distinct socio-politico-economic conditions in the village life of India by representing them coupled with satire in a style of rural fiction and remarkable reality. The title Rag Darbari does not suggest one of the Ragas of Indian classical music, but a song sung by a village politician, characterized by Vaidyaji in the novel, on whose tone all other in the village dance. The novel portrays gloomy depiction of social and political corruption and highly delicate dynamics of the same prevalent during postcolonial India.

== Plot ==
The village has several characters, most notable of who is Vaidyaji – the patriarch of the village. He is assisted by his sons Badri Pehelwaan (or in English, Badri the Wrestler) and Ruppan Babu. A few more notable characters are the teachers at the village school, and the principal (whose characteristic trait is to burst into Awadhi, his native tongue, whenever he is very angry or excited).

The story does not have a fixed plot – it is merely a series of anecdotes. It also does not have a hero or protagonist. Vaidyaji's nephew, named Ranganath, visits Shivpalganj after completing his M.A. in History. His health has been failing, and the doctors have advised a visit to the countryside for him to gather his strength. It is funny how Vaidyaji (which means "healer") heals the young boy's mind in more ways than one. After his masters, Ranganath, who is a big believer in high ideals and "poetic justice", comes face to face with the hypocrisy and the meanness of the village gang. The very first incident highlights his innocence and blind faith. In order to travel to his uncle's place, Ranganath boards a truck. The driver is a rash fellow, who drives carelessly without regard for the pedestrians. After witnessing him nearly run over a few cows and sleeping shepherds, the young man is finally elated when a few police officials pull the bus over. From a distance, Ranganath watches them question the driver. Although they are trying to extort money out of the driver, it appears to Ranganath that the driver is being punished for his foul deeds. There are several such incidents, one after the other, that shatter Ranganath's high ideals and faith in justice. He is a mere spectator of the system – unable to make a mark or stand up for himself.

== Characters ==
- Vaidyaji: He is the mastermind behind all village politics. Very articulate in framing his sentences and choosing his words, Vaidyaji is also officially the manager of the local college.
- Ruppan Babu: The younger son of Vaidyaji and the leader of college students, Ruppan Babu has remained in the 10th grade for last 10 years as he does not want to leave college, in which his father is the manager. Ruppan is actively involved in all village politics and is well respected by the village community due to his illustrious parentage. Towards the end of the novel, a gradual change can be observed in his behaviour.
- Badri Pehelwan: Elder brother of Ruppan Babu. Badri keeps himself away from his father's involvements and keeps himself busy with bodybuilding exercises and taking care of his protégé.
- Ranganath: An M.A. in History, Ranganath is the nephew of Vaidyaji. He has come to Shivpalganj on a vacation for about 5–6 months. It appears that the author wants to give the view of the pathetic condition in the villages through the eyes of an educated person.
- Chhote Pehelwan: One of the protégé's of Badri Pehelwan and devout decipline of Lord Hanuman, Chhote is an active participant in village politics and is a frequent participant in the meetings summoned by Vaidyaji.
- Principal Sahib: As the name denotes, Principal Sahib is the principal of Chhangamal Vidyarthi Inter College. His relationship with other members of the staff in college forms an important part of the plot.
- Jognath: The local goon, almost always drunk. He speaks a unique language known as ''Sarfari'' by inserting an "F" sound between every 2 syllables.
- Sanichar: His real name is Mangaldas but people call him Sanichar. He is a servant to Vaidyaji and was later made the puppet pradhaan (leader) of village with the use of political tactics by Vaidyaji.
- Langad: He is a representative of the hapless common man who has to bend in front of the corrupt system, even to get small things done.

== Adaptations ==
Raag Darbari, an Indian television series, adapted from the novel, aired on DD National from 1986 to 1987.

Based on Girish Rastogi's adaptation of Raag Darbari, Bahroop Arts Group staged "Ranganath Ki Waapsi", directed by Rajesh Singh (alumnus of National School of Drama) on 18 November 2009, at Alliance Française de New Delhi.

In 2018, theatre director Amitesh Grover (Ustad Bismillah Khan Yuva Puruskar Awardee) staged an original adaptation of the novel, dramatised by Sarah Mariam, at the National School of Drama, India.
