= Alka Saraogi =

Indian novelist

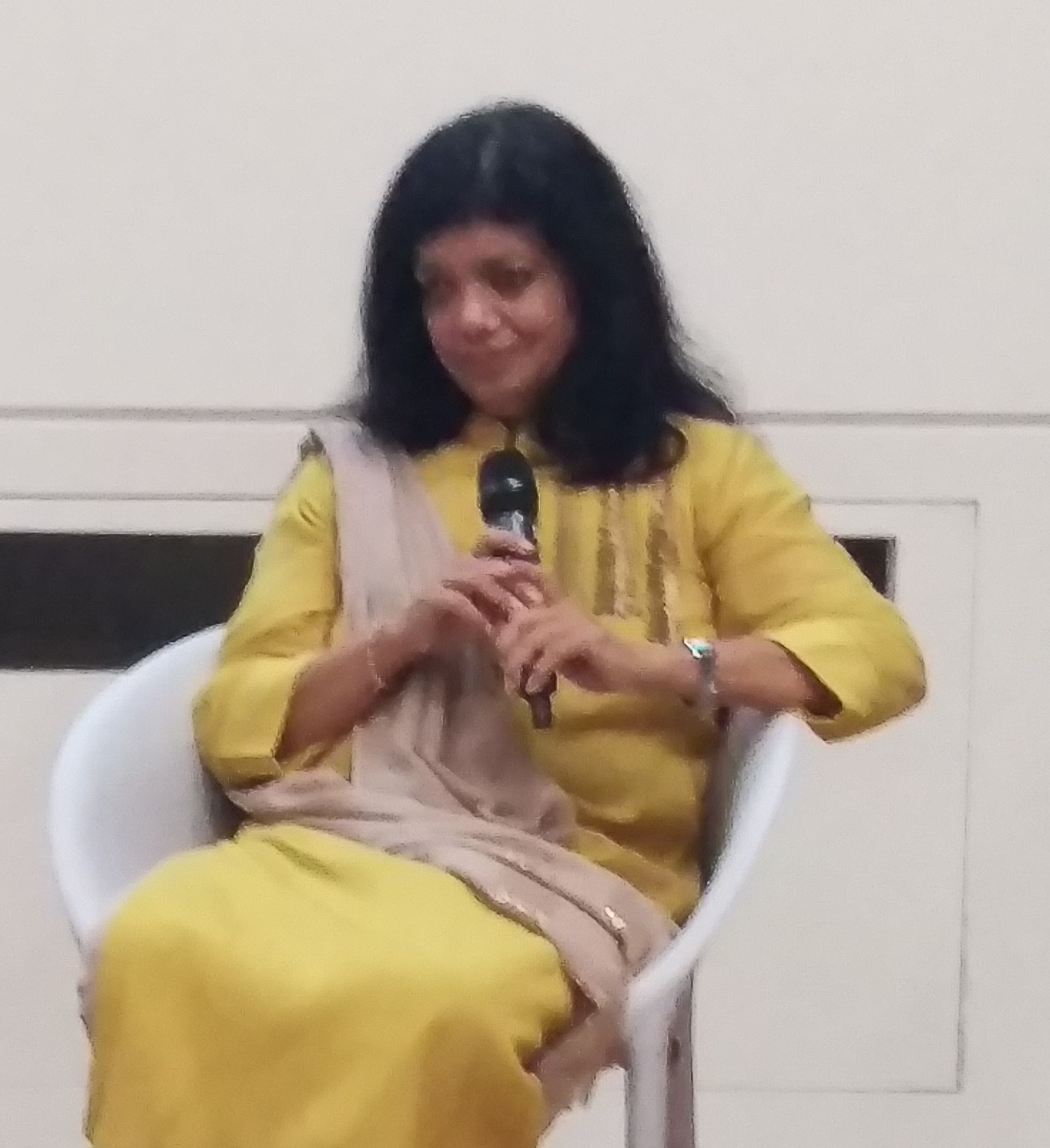
- Saraogi in 2016
- Born: 17 November 1960 (age 65); Kolkata, West Bengal, India
- Occupation: Writer
- Writing career
- Language: Hindi

Alka Saraogi (Hindi: अलका सरावगी; born 17 November 1960) is an Indian novelist and short story writer in the Hindi language. She is a recipient of the 2001 Sahitya Akademi Award for Hindi for her novel Kalikatha: Via Bypass.

== Biography ==
Alka Saraogi was born in a Marwari family of Rajasthani origin in Kolkata. She studied at Calcutta University, receiving a PhD for her thesis on the poetry of Raghuvir Sahay.

Following her marriage and the birth of two children, Saraogi began to write short stories. Her first published work was Āp kī haṁsī (Your laughter), a story taking its title from one of Raghuvir Sahay's poems. Saraogi's mentor, Ashok Seksaria, sent it to Vartaman Sahitya, a Hindi literary journal, where it received favourable notice. She then published Kahānī kī talāś meṁ in 1996, a collection of short stories.

Her first novel, Kalikatha: Via Bypass, came out in 1998. It was awarded the Sahitya Akademi Award for Hindi literature in 2001. She followed this up with four further novels, the latest – Jānkidās Tejpāl mansion – published in 2015.

== Critical commentary ==
=== Language and culture ===
Marwaris and Bengalis, despite coexisting in Kolkata for many generations, have led largely disjoint lives. In Bengali literature and art, the Marwari appears typically as a stereotype, a money-making reactionary. Saraogi's writing is in Hindi, albeit neither overly Sanskritised, nor informed by the popular Hindi film industry. Though she often uses Bengali expressions in her novels, especially in the speech of Bengali characters, even in her oeuvre the breach between the Hindi- and Bengali-speaking communities remains unbridged.

=== Kalikatha: Via Bypass ===
Saraogi's first novel, Kalikatha: Via Bypass, is a work of historical fiction. It examines the Marwari community, long established in Kolkata as a merchants yet still exploring its position among the Bengali culture. It is written from the point of view of a male protagonist, Kishore Babu, who following an operation for a head injury, begins to wander around the city, observing its economic life and histories. He compares its majoritarian society against the patriarchal mores of his Marwari community, contrasts his own memories with popular memory, and experiences the ways in which Kolkata of the 1940s melds into that of the 1990s. As Kishore Babu wanders across the city and his own memories, pondering the loves and lives of his ancestors and descendants, his ruminations enliven the entire community, and the narrative structure of the novel too flips between the ages. Saraogi's unflinching prose does not flatter the Marwaris, though the privations of a community on the margin are described evocatively. Kolkata Marwaris have often been accused of making money at the expense of the Bengalis, but this is not addressed in the novel. Rather, it sets in stark contrast the ostensible nobility of their spirit against the parochiality of their lives.

=== Shesh Kadambari ===
The protagonist of this novel, Ruby Gupta, is a Marwari woman who faces the dichotomy of two social values: the wealth and enterprise of her Marwari father versus the austere and intellectual nature of her mother's family. Saraogi addresses the nuances of cultural differences through Ruby's eyes. Once again, the narrative oscillates between periods of Ruby's childhood and her old age. Having been wealthy in a city of poverty is a stigma she finds hard to atone. Discovering the source of her father's wealth - the opium trade - adds further discomfort. Meanwhile, she recognises the innate hypocrisy of her mother's relatives who disparage her father and his business, yet continue to live off him.

Following the male-dominated viewpoint of her first novel, Saraogi's switch to a female perspective offers further reinforcement of the weight of cultural expectation. Despite being a patriarch, Kishore Babu in Kalikatha: Via Bypass was unable to step outside his social mores to ameliorate his widowed sister-in-law's life. In Shesh Kadambari, seeking an understanding of self for all her seventy years of life, Ruby Gupta comes to realise that her social work has not resulted in any social justice for herself.

=== Jankidas Tejpal Mansion ===
The story of a US-educated engineer who returns to India and gets embroiled in the Naxalite movement, Saraogi's novel sweeps across the early optimism of India's freedom to the broken dreams of the present. Jaygovind's life follows the disappointments of the first post-Independence generation, mirrored in the social schisms of America, from the Vietnam War to Wikileaks.

== Works ==
- Kahānī kī talāś meṁ. Panchkorla: Adhar. 1996.
  - https://www.youtube.com/watch?v=eRsOmpPFrj4 - For Audio Story - Aapki Hansi
  - https://www.youtube.com/watch?v=GK0KiZgbDqs - For Audio Story
- Kalikatha: Via bypass. Adhar. 2002. ISBN 978-81-7675-069-1.
- Shesh Kadambari. New Delhi: Rajkamal. 2002. ISBN 978-81-267-0446-0.
- Doosrī Kahānī. New Delhi: Rajkamal. 2003. ISBN 978-81-267-0677-8.
- Koi bāt nahīn. New Delhi: Rajkamal. 2004. ISBN 978-81-267-0841-3.
- Ek break ke bād. New Delhi: Rajkamal. 2008. ISBN 978-81-267-1529-9.
- Jānkidās Tejpāl mansion. New Delhi: Rajkamal. 2015. ISBN 978-81-267-2766-7.

== Bibliography ==
=== On Alka Saraogi's oeuvre ===
- Consolaro, Alessandra (2007). "Translating contemporary Hindi literature in Italy: Academy, publishers, readers" (PDF). Selected Papers of the CETRA Research Seminar in Translation Studies 2006.
- Parson, Rahul (2012). The Bazaar and the Bari: Calcutta, Marwaris, and the World of Hindi Letters. Berkeley: University of California.
- Pesso‐Miquel, Catherine (2007). "Addressing Oppression in Literature: Strategies of resistance in Indian and Indian English contemporary fiction". Journal of Postcolonial Writing. 43 (2): 149–160. doi:10.1080/17449850701430473. S2CID 142619649.
- Mukherjee, Meenakshi (2008). "Power and the Case of Horizontal Translation". In Saugata Bhaduri (ed.). Translating Power: Stories, Essays, Criticism. Katha. ISBN 978-81-899-3424-8.
- Pandey, Indu Prakash (2008). Hindī ke prayogadharmī upanyāsa (in Hindi). Star. ISBN 9788185244976.
- Singh, Avadhesh Kumar (May 2006). "Alka Saraogi in Conversation with Avadhesh Kumar Singh". Indian Literature. 50 (3): 166–170. JSTOR 23341001.

=== Reviews ===
- Gokhale, Namita (16 December 2002). "Memory's bylane". India Today.
- Gupta, Om (24 July 2003). "No bypassing a tale well told". The Hindu. Archived from the original on 4 November 2003.
- Kumar, Suresh (8 July 2015). "Jankidas Tejpal Mansion, which has collapsed". Aaj Tak (in Hindi).
- Sehgal, Arunima (2 February 2003). "Bypassing life". The Tribune.
- Stobinsky, Martina (16 November 2006). "Alka Saraogi: Umweg nach Kalkutta" (in German). Suedasien.info.
