= Syrian literature =

Syrian literature is modern fiction written or orally performed in Arabic by writers from Syria since the independence of the Syrian Arab Republic in 1946. It is part of the historically and geographically wider Arabic literature. Literary works by Syrian authors in the historical region of Syria since the Umayyad era are considered general Arabic literature. In its historical development since the beginnings of compilations of the Quran in the 7th century and later written records, the Arabic language has been considered a geographically comprehensive, standardized written language due to the religious or literary works written in classical Arabic. This sometimes differs considerably from the individual regionally spoken variants, such as Syrian, Egyptian or Moroccan spoken forms of Arabic.

In Arabic, bilad ash-sham refers to the region of the eastern Mediterranean known in Europe as the Levant. The individual areas of this region have close historical, geographical and cultural similarities and during the Ottoman Empire there were only administrative divisions. Especially between the larger cities such as Beirut, Tripoli, Aleppo and Damascus, there has been active cultural exchange both in the past and present.

The modern states of Syria and neighbouring Lebanon, Jordan, Israel as well as the Palestinian autonomous areas only came into being in the mid-20th century. Therefore, Syrian literature has since been referred to by literary scholarship as the national literature of the Syrian Arab Republic, as well as the works created in Arabic by Syrian writers in the diaspora. This literature has been influenced by the country's political history, the literature of other Arabic-speaking countries and, especially in its early days, by French literature.

Thematically, modern Syrian literature has often been inspired by social and political conditions during the different stages of the country's recent history. Other prominent themes have been everyday life in major cities including Damascus and Aleppo, but also in villages and smaller towns, reflecting the writer's own experience. Especially for women writers, the gender-specific and often dire conditions of life for women have been a central theme. Apart from these specific social settings, general human experiences such as love, sexuality, isolation and existentialist themes have been expressed.

Apart from major literary genres such as Arabic poetry, prose and theatrical works, contemporary Syrian literature also encompasses literature for children and young readers, as well as oral literature and subgenres such as science fiction, including utopian and dystopian fiction.

== Definitions of Syrian national literature ==
From 2001 onwards, literary scholars have started to define a distinctly Syrian literature, referring to genres such as the Syrian novel, poetry, or theatre, while other studies have also attempted to define a more general character of Syrian literature. (Note: See, for example, the studies by Mohja Kahf (2001), Alexa Firat (2010), Elisabeth Vauthier (2014), Anne-Marie McManus (2014 and 2018) cited in the section below for Literature.) The Arabic Encyclopedia, published after 1998 in Damascus, outlined both the history and modern era of literary writing in Syria. Both this Syrian encyclopedia as well as Western scholars have described the beginnings of a Syrian literature starting from the late 19th century, and as a concrete national literature since the mid-20th century. (Note: Firat (2017) wrote: "This chapter examines the origins of the novel genre in Syria. Approximately eighteen novels by "Syrians" were published between 1865 and the 1930s, but only a limited number would have a significant influence in subsequent decades. In the 1930s, literary histories described an emerging "new generation" and the beginnings of a modern literary movement in the novel and the short story, and during the 1950s the practice of novel writing took on a truly meaningful proportion in Syria." Firat, Alexa (10 August 2017). "Syria". academic.oup.com. p. 439. Archived from the original on 2024-04-19.)

In his essay "In Search of the Readers", Syrian literary scholar Abdo Abboud explained the different perspectives and justifications for the overarching literary category "Arabic literature" in contrast with national literatures in Arabic of individual countries, such as Egyptian, Lebanese, or Moroccan literature. As a definition for these national literatures categories, he wrote: "Each of the 22 Arab states has its own literary world, and each of these literary worlds reflects the reality of the region on which it depends to a certain extent." Thus Abboud posited that on the one hand, Syrian literature is marked by national references, but on the other hand, modern Syrian literature may also have a character independent of its place of origin, as in the works of Syrian writers Haidar Haidar, Ghada al-Samman or Adonis. Furthermore, until the founding of the modern state of Syria in 1946, the works of Syrian writers largely developed in similar cultural contexts as the literature in the geographic region of modern-day Lebanon. This is especially true for the works of the Arab Renaissance (Nahda), starting at the end of the 19th century. Syrian literature is therefore also part of a wider Arabic literature, due to the linguistic and cultural similarities of the literary works.

The overarching dimension of Arabic literature can also be identified in the areas of publishing and readership. Many Syrian writers publish their works outside their home country, especially in Lebanon and Egypt, with publishers in Gulf countries also gaining importance after 2011. Further, an important reason for the wider Arabic literature lies in the use of the Arabic written language:

Despite regional dialects, Arabic in its standard version is a largely uniform language. This enables literature to reach its readers – at least in theory – in all Arab countries. The poet Nizar Qabbani once aptly said that he lived "in the same room" with 200 million Arabs. [...] Modern Arab literary creators find their audience, especially with their outstanding works, everywhere in the Arab world and by no means only in the respective region from which they themselves originate.

— Abdo Abboud, Syrian literary scholar

The American literary scholar of Syrian descent Mohja Kahf began her 2001 essay "The Silences of Contemporary Syrian Literature" with the provocative thesis that there is no Syrian literature, which she blamed above all on the ambiguous definition of the country in geographical and historical terms. Nevertheless, she described the works of numerous Syrian authors as Syrian literature, focusing on the conditions of writing under the dictatorship of the political regime. She especially emphasized the absence of certain political themes, due to the writers' dependence on the goodwill of the government, censorship and publication bans, such as the 1982 Hama massacre and other forms of repression, which she saw absent in modern Syrian literature. Given the violations of human and political rights in the country, she emphasized the "silence" around these issues as an overarching feature:

Contemporary Syrian literature is created in the crucible of a tenacious authoritarianism. Manifold silence, evasion, indirect figurative speech, gaps and lacunae are striking features of Syrian writing, habits of thought and wary writerly techniques that have developed during an era dominated, [...], by authoritarian governments with heavy-handed censorship policies and stringent punitive measures.

— Mohja Kahf, US-American literary scholar of Syrian descent

Following the outbreak of the war in Syria in 2011, Kahf wrote that partially as a result of social media and the Internet, this silence had changed and "A new Syrian identity and literary tradition are being formed around the events of the last few years." Referring to works written under the influence of long-lasting government repression and the war since 2011, other scholars have discussed sub-genres such as Syrian prison literature and Syrian war literature.

In 2022, scholars of Arabic literature Daniel Behar and Alexa Firat stressed that the history of literature of Syria should not merely be categorized as reflections of political events, but rather as "a long literary past that feeds into literary production in the present." As Syrian literature is made up of "a rich tradition of styles, genres, tropes, and sensibilities", the authors posit "that Syrian literature should be examined with reference and regard to internal dynamics and autonomous modes of engagement with diverse literary and historical worlds rather than as determined by regime violence."

== Pre-modern literature in Syria ==
Arabic calligraphy of the name Abū l-ʿAlāʾ al-Maʿarrī, a poet and philosopher in northern Syria (973–1057)

Scholars have treated literature from the historical periods of Syria as part of the wider field of Arabic literature. Overviews on Arabic literature, such as the Encyclopedia of Arabic Literature only write of "Syrian" poetry, novels or drama from the modern period onwards and speak of Arabic literature "from Syria" in pre-modern times.

At the time of the Umayyad Caliphate (c. 661 to 750 CE), with its seat of government in Damascus, praise poems about high-ranking personalities at court, written in the classical form of the qasida, and poems of ridicule against rivals played an important role. The poets al-Farazdaq (640–728), Al-Akhtal (640–708), and Jarir ibn Atiyah (c. 653 – c. 729), who had come to Damascus from various regions of the caliphate, were some of the important literary figures of this period. The four-volume anthology Yatīmat by the Arab poet and medieval literary critic Al-Tha'alibi (961–1038) and his subsequent anthology Tatimmat contain works by numerous poets in Syria at the time. These anthologies were followed by the historian Imad al-Din al-Isfahani's (1125–1201) work Kharidat al-qasr wa-jaridat al-'asr. This anthology, written in the service of the Sultan of Syria Nur al-Din Zengi and his successor Saladin, contains numerous mentions of Syrian poets and their verses.

The blind poet and philosopher Abū l-ʿAlāʾ al-Maʿarrī (973–1057) from Maarat an-Numan in northern Syria is considered as one of the greatest classical Arab poets. His risalat al-ghufran has been compared with Dante's Divine Comedy. Usama ibn Munqidh (1095–1188), a Syrian writer and poet, politician and diplomat, was one of the most important contemporary chroniclers of the Crusades from an Arab perspective. Due to his work as a diplomat, he knew important personalities personally, both on the Arab and Christian sides. His memoir Kitab al-I'tibar provides insight into the living conditions and the relationship between Christians and Muslims at that time. In the 13th century, Ibn Abī Usaybiʿa (c. 1194 – 1270), a Syrian physician, medical historian, and biographer, wrote his Literary History of Medicine, which is primarily a collection of 380 biographies, mainly of Arabic-speaking physicians and scientists.

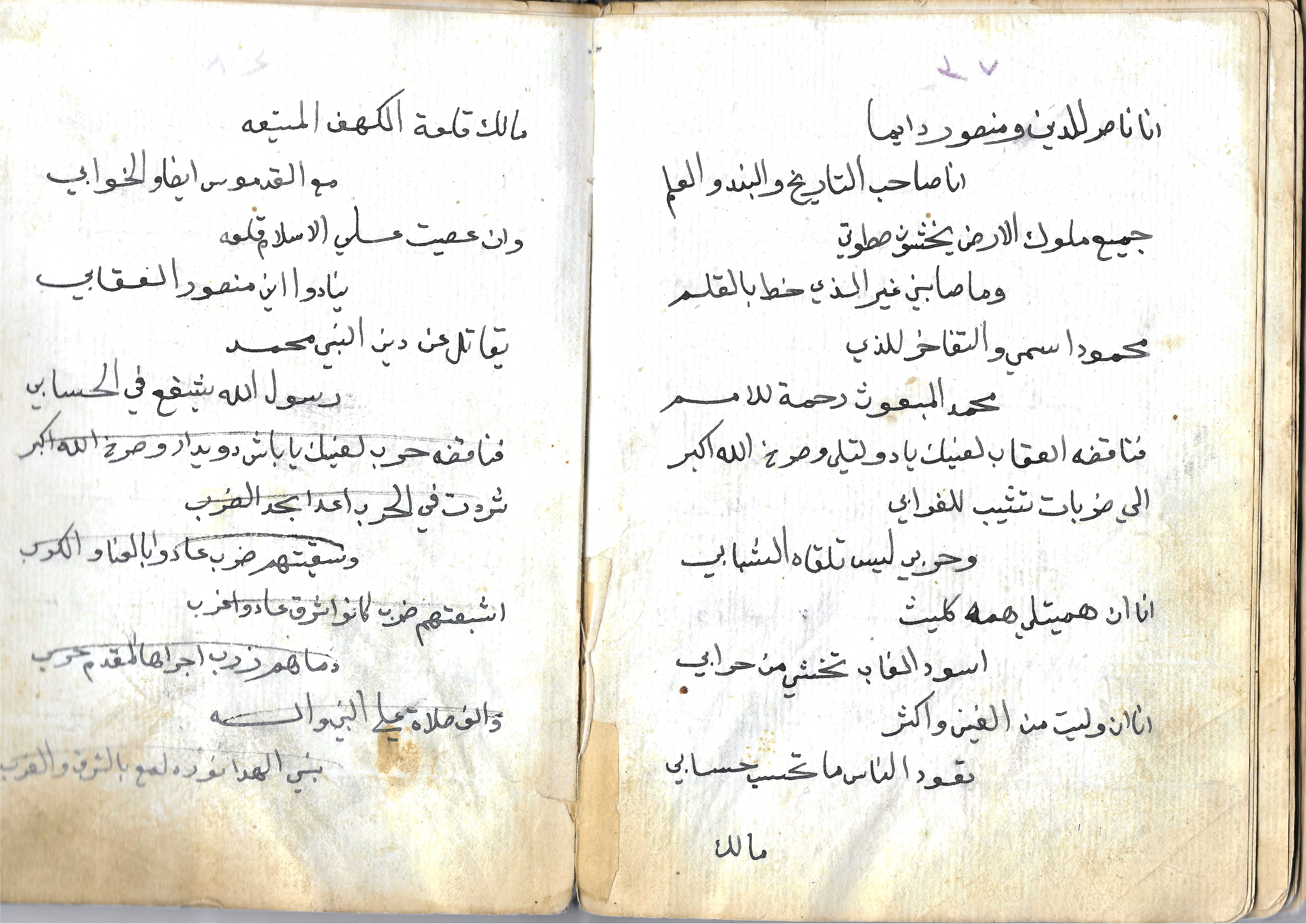
Poem about Sultan Baybars from a Syrian hakawati book

In 1709, the Maronite storyteller Hanna Diyab (1688 – c.1770) from Aleppo was involved in a work of world literature, which has undergone numerous editions and translations since its first translation from Arabic into a European language. The French orientalist Antoine Galland published Diyab's stories Aladdin and Ali Baba in his translation of One Thousand and One Nights. Diyab had first told these and more than a dozen other stories to Galland, and Galland incorporated Diyab's tales as supposedly authentic parts of the Arabian Nights. Two centuries later, Diyab's autobiographical travelogue was found in the Vatican Library. After scholarly examination of this Arabic manuscript and confirmation of the author and his work, it was published in English in 2022 as The Book of Travels. In the field of oral literature from Syria, folk tales, lyrics for songs, proverbs as well as improvised poems and storytelling have been popular. In tea rooms and coffee houses, storytellers called hakawati entertained people with their tales, characterized by colloquial expressions, rhymes and exaggerations. These stories may have originated from various traditional sources, such as One Thousand and One Nights, from epics by legendary Arab heroes such as Antarah ibn Shaddad and Sultan Baybars or from the Quran. By alternating between Standard Arabic and colloquial language, the storyteller provided the different characters and situations with appropriate literary forms of expression. In order to keep such stories alive in the Syrian diaspora, the bilingual anthology Timeless Tales. Folktales told by Syrian Refugees, published online in Arabic and English, presented traditional folk tales as told by Syrian refugees.

== Modern literature in Syria ==
Modern Syrian literature developed in the following periods:

- the emergence of modern literature in the Levant at the end of the 19th and beginning of the 20th centuries
- the emergence of a national literature since the middle of the 20th century
- the literature in the context of war and imprisonment of the 21st century

=== Literature of the Arab cultural renaissance (late 19th and early 20th century) ===
Mention no longer the driver on his night journey and the wide striding camels, and give up talk of morning dew and ruins.
I no longer have any taste for love songs on dwellings which already went down in seas of [too many] odes.
So, too, the ghada, whose fire, fanned by the sighs of those enamored of it, cries out to the poets: "Alas for my burning!"
If a steamer leaves with my friends on sea or land, why should I direct my complaints to the camels?

— Excerpt from Francis Marrash's Mashhad al-ahwal (1870), translated by Shmuel Moreh.

In the late 19th and early 20th centuries, writers primarily from Egypt, Lebanon and Syria created a reform-oriented cultural movement that became known as the Nahda (Arab Renaissance) movement. Among other views, they argued that religion and scientific progress in their region are compatible. They viewed Islam as a viable basis for a modern Arab society, but at the same time called for a renewal of Islam in the spirit of the spirit of the age. In Syria, which was then still under Ottoman rule, intellectuals took part in the Nahda movement with their literary and programmatic works.

Francis Marrash (1835–1874) was a Syrian writer and poet of the Nahda, who lived as a member of a cosmopolitan Melkite Greek Catholic family in Aleppo. Most of his works deal with science, history and religion, which he analyzed from a realist philosophical view. His 1865 novel Ghābat al-ḥaqq (Forest of Truth) has been called one of the first novels in the Arabic language. He was also influential in introducing French romanticism in the Arab world, especially through his use of poetic prose and prose poetry, of which his writings were the first examples in modern Arabic literature, according to literary scholar Salma Khadra Jayyusi. His modes of thinking and feeling, and ways of expressing them, have had a lasting influence on contemporary Arab thought and on the expatriate Mahjari poets.

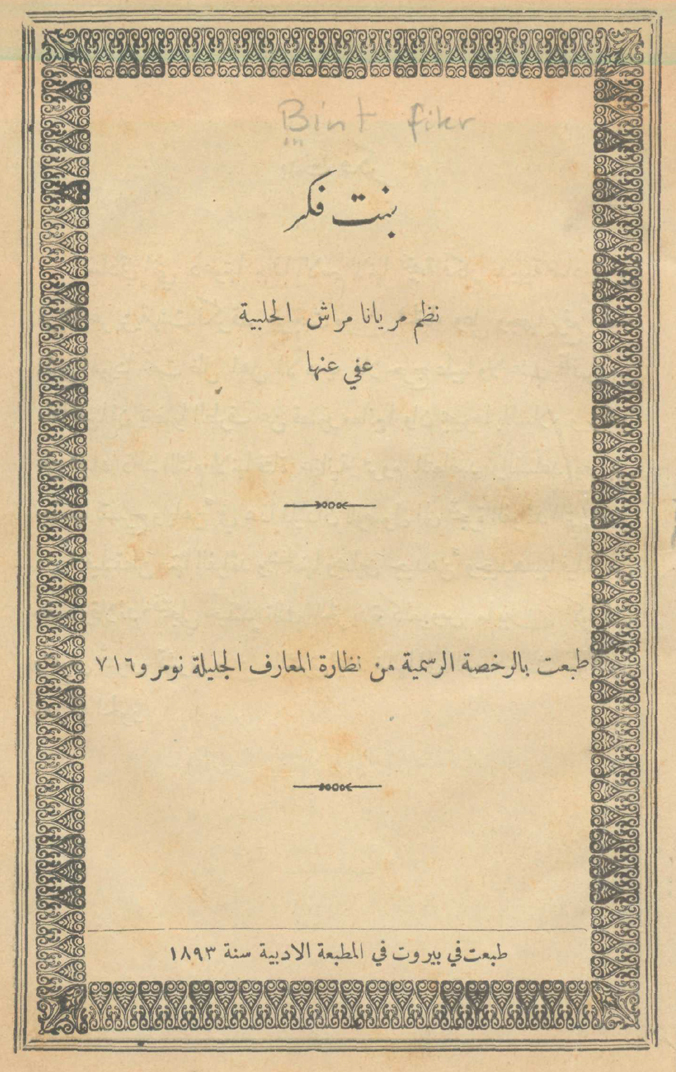
Collection of poetry Bint fikr (A Daughter of Thought) by Maryana Marrash, 1893

Marrash's brother Abdallah (1839–1900) also achieved literary importance, while his sister Maryana Marrash (1848–1919) was known as poet and for her literary salon. She was the first Syrian woman to publish a volume of poetry, and wrote literary articles in the Arabic press. At that time, Aleppo was an important intellectual center of the Ottoman Empire, where many intellectuals and writers were concerned with the future of Arab culture. The Marrash family had learned Arabic, French and other foreign languages, such as Italian and English in French mission schools.

Qustaki al-Himsi (1858–1941), a well-traveled and wealthy businessman from Aleppo, was another Syrian writer, translator from French and poet of the Nahda movement. As one of the first reformers of traditional Arabic poetry, he became a prominent figure in Arabic literature of the 19th and 20th centuries. Himsi is considered the founder of modern literary criticism among Arab intellectuals through his three-volume treatise The Researcher's Source in the Science of Criticism (1907 and 1935).

The Syrian historian, literary critic and founder of the Academy of the Arabic Language in Damascus in 1918, Muhammad Kurd Ali (1876–1953), is considered one of the great personalities of the Arab renaissance movement.

=== Syrian national literature since the mid-20th century ===
After the 1930s, a new generation of a modern literary movement emerged, particularly in the short story and novel genres. These include the historical novels by Ma'ruf Ahmad al-Arna'ut (1892–1942) as well as al-Naham (1937, Greed) and Qawz-quzah (Rainbow, 1946) by Shakib al-Jabiri, which represent milestones in the development of modern fiction in Syria.

In 1948, the partition of neighbouring Palestine and the creation of Israel led to a new turning point in Syrian literature. Adab al-Iltizam, the "literature of political engagement" characterized by social realism, largely replaced the romantic trend of the past decades. Prominent representatives belonged to the League of Arab Writers founded in Damascus in 1951 and the Arab Writers Union that later emerged from it in 1969. The writers in this union shaped the literature of socialist oriented realism for the next twenty years. Hanna Mina (1924–2018), who rejected art for art's sake and dealt with the social and political problems of his time, was one of the foremost Syrian novelists of this movement. After the Six-Day War in 1967, Adab al-Naksa, the "literature of defeat", represented the next important genre in light of the Arab defeat.

Baath Party rule since the 1966 coup brought about stifling censorship. As literary scholar Hanadi Al-Samman puts it, "In the face of threats of persecution or imprisonment, most of Syria's writers had to make a choice between living a life of artistic freedom in exile [...] or resorting to subversive modes of expression that seemingly comply with the demands of the authoritarian police state while undermining and questioning the legitimacy of its rule through subtle literary techniques and new genres". Thus, Syrian literature in the late 20th and early 21st centuries displays characteristics of long-lasting authoritarian rule. The central theme in the Syrian novel of the 2000s is the constant threat of surveillance and oppression by the secret services (mukhābarāt) and other governmental organizations.

In 1977, the Syrian writer and journalist Zakaria Tamer (b. 1931) remarked: "The power of words is ridiculous in a country that is 70% illiterate." Despite the high number of publishers (379 publishers listed by the Ministry of Economic Affairs in 2004), the numbers of published literary works are relatively low. Among others, several major reasons have been named:

- watching television as a privileged leisure activity
- the low number of libraries and bookstores
- the price of the books
- the shortage of skilled staff in the book sector
- illegal reprints without regard to author's rights
- censorship with revisions taking several months
- as well as the banning of numerous works

==== 20th-century prose ====
Since 1960, the year he published his first collection of short stories, Zakaria Tamer has been one of the best-known prose authors among the Arab public. In his work, he places figures from the Arabic literary tradition in new contexts and thus alludes to the present of his readers. Apart from many short stories, Tamer also wrote books for children and as columnist for Arabic newspapers. After working for many years as a public employee in the Syrian Ministry of Culture and at Syrian state television, he moved to London in 1981, where he also worked as a cultural journalist for Arabic newspapers and magazines.

Haidar Haidar (1936–2023), who came from a village on the Mediterranean coast north of Tartus with a majority Alawite population, was known for his critical attitude towards political and religious institutions and his controversial topics. He wrote seventeen works of novels, short stories, essays and biographies, including Az-Zaman al-Muhish (The Desolate Time), which was listed as number 7 by the Arab Writers Union as one of the 100 best Arabic novels of the 20th century. His novel Walimah li A'ashab al-Bahr, (A Feast for the Seaweeds), first published in Beirut in 1983, was banned in several Arab countries and led to an angry reaction from clerics at Al-Azhar University when the book was reprinted in Egypt in 2000. The clerics issued a fatwa , banning the novel and accused Haidar of heresy and insulting Islam. The plot focuses on two left-wing Iraqi intellectuals who fled their country in the 1970s and who blame dictators and authoritarian politics for the oppression in the Arab world.

Ghada al-Samman (* 1942) comes from a bourgeois Damascene family. Her father was for some time president of Damascus University. After initially studying English literature, she went to Beirut to obtain a Master of Arts in Theatre Studies at the American University of Beirut. Among other topics, her works deal with the Six-Day War and the problems of Lebanon before and during the Lebanese Civil War, which began in 1975 and only ended in 1990. She is also considered a feminist author due to her texts that deal with the social and psychological restrictions for women in the Arab world. Al-Samman initially worked as a journalist and published more than 40 novels, short stories, collections of poetry and autobiographical works that have been translated into several languages. Her novels and short stories express strong Arab nationalist sentiment and criticize Zionism by siding with the Palestinians. In some of her novels, such as Beirut '75, she exposes class differences, gender conflicts and corruption in the Lebanese capital and indirectly predicted the civil war that would soon follow. Al-Samman never returned to Syria after her years in Beirut and has lived in Paris since the mid-1980s.

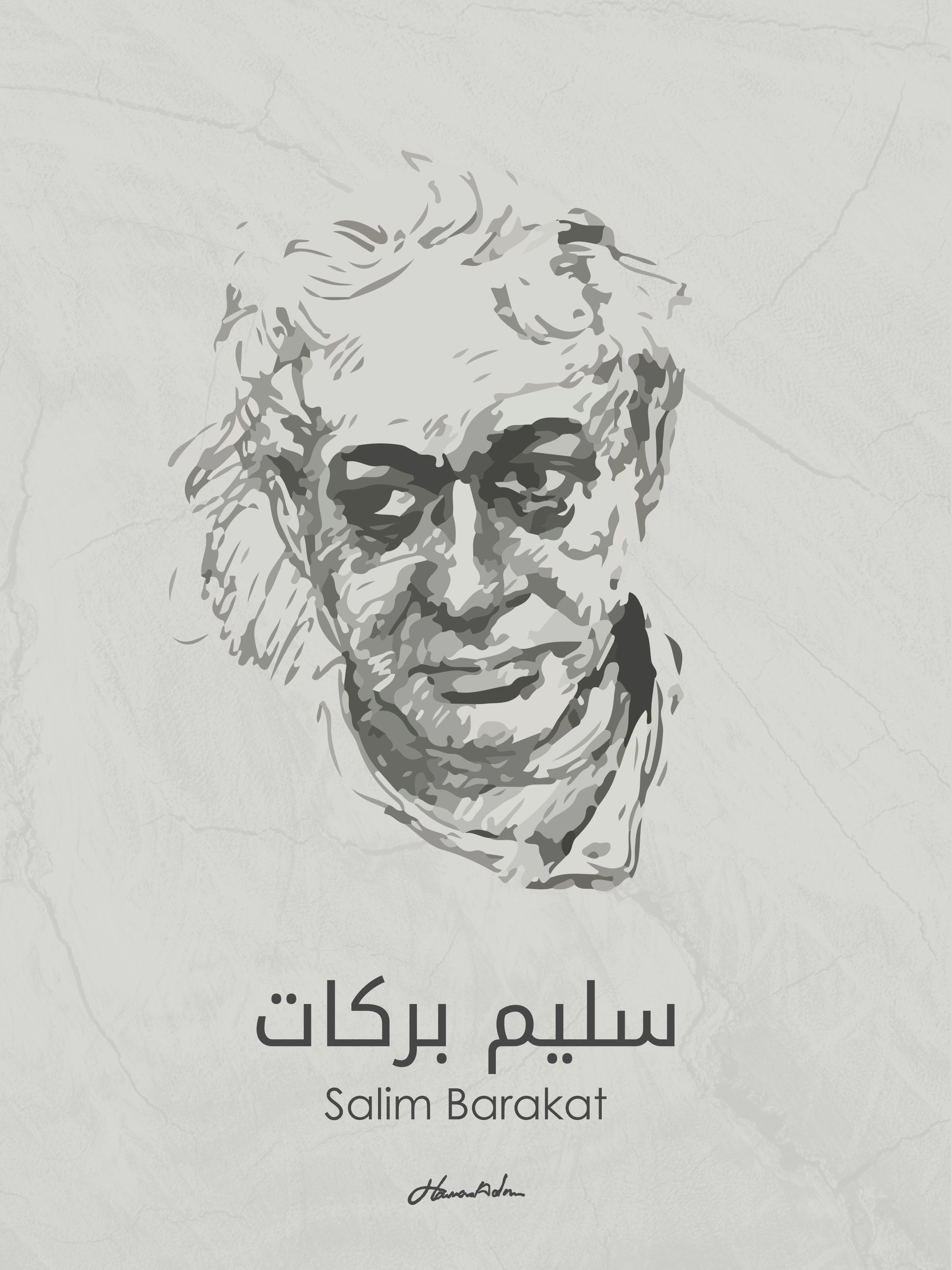
Artist's impression of Salim Barakat

The early works of the Syrian Kurdish writer Salim Barakat (* 1951), born in Qamishli, are characterized by his youthful experiences with the diverse cultural influences of the Arab, Assyrian, Armenian, Circassian and Yazidi ethnic groups in this region bordering Turkey. In 1970, Barakat traveled to Damascus to study Arabic literature, but after a year moved on to Beirut, where he lived until 1982. During his stay in Beirut, he published five volumes of poetry, a diary and two volumes of autobiographies. His volume of short stories from 1980, The Iron Grasshopper contains depictions of the life of the Kurdish population in his homeland. In 1982 he moved to Cyprus and worked as editor-in-chief of the literary magazine Al Karmel, whose editor was the Palestinian poet Mahmoud Darwish. In 1999 Barakat emigrated to Sweden, where he has lived ever since.

Khaled Khalifa (1964–2023), born in a village near Aleppo and living in Damascus from the late 1990s until his death, was a Syrian novelist, screenwriter and poet who is also one of the well-known Arab authors. Khalifa studied law at the University of Aleppo. He was co-founder and co-editor of the literary magazine Alif, a forum for experimental writing, and a member of the Literary Forum at the University of Aleppo. Khalifa wrote novels and screenplays for films and television series that were adapted into films by Syrian directors. In 2013 he was awarded the Naguib Mahfouz Medal for Literature and was nominated three times for the International Prize for Arabic Fiction. His works were often critical of Syria's Ba'athist government and were banned in the country and edited by Lebanese publishers. His novels In Praise of Hatred, No Knives in the Kitchens of This City, Death is Hard Work and No One Prayed Over Their Graves have been translated into several languages.

Other notable Syrian prose writers since the late 20th century include Khairy Alzahaby (1946–2022) Taissier Khalaf, a novelist and cultural historian born in 1967 in Quneitra, Fawwaz Haddad (b. 1947) and Mustafa Khalifa (b. 1948), two of the many writers who included war and imprisonment in their stories, Ya'rab al-Eissa (b. 1969), Haitham Hussein (b. 1978), Ghamar Mahmoud (b. 1980), as well as a growing number of women writers mentioned below.

==== 20th-century poetry ====
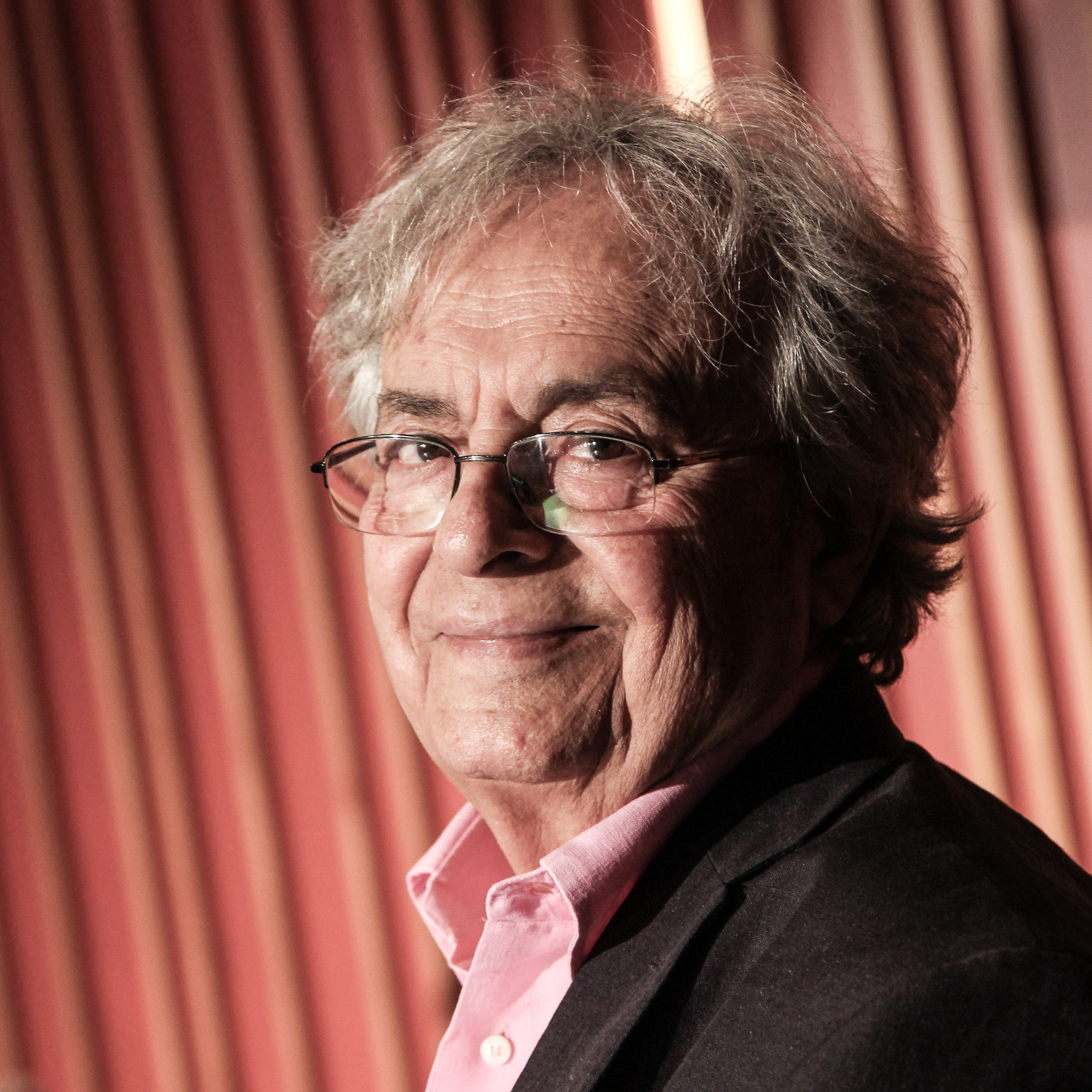
Adonis in 2015

Ali Ahmad Said (* 1930), who publishes under his pen name Adonis, was born near Latakia in northern Syria in 1930. After some years in Beirut, he has lived in Paris since 1985. Adonis is one of the best-known poets on the Arab and international literary scene. In 1957, together with his compatriot Yusuf al-Khal (1917–1987) and other renowned writers, he started the avant-garde literary magazine Shi'r ("Poetry"), in which the authors opposed the formal rigour and traditional styles of classical Arabic poetry. By drawing on the content of historical Arabic poets, who knew no taboos and were, among other things, critical of religion, Adonis intended to revitalize this intellectual openness. In addition to his poems, Adonis repeatedly caused a stir in the Arab world with his critical essays. Yusuf al-Khal made a name for himself as a poet and literary theorist as well as through his translations, primarily of English and American literature, into Arabic. As a Syrian Christian, he also translated the New and part of the Old Testament into Arabic. In the last year of his life, he advocated the use of colloquial Arabic in literature and from then on consistently wrote in Syrian Arabic.

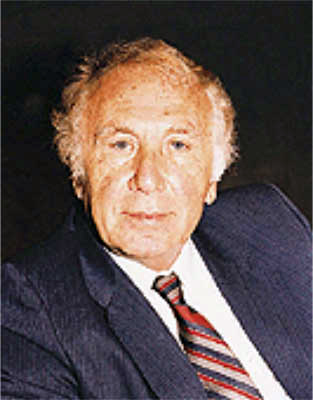
Nizar Qabbani

The Damascus-born poet Nizar Qabbani (1923–1998) is one of Syria's best-known poets. As a young man, he studied law and later became ambassador of his country until 1966. In verses that were unusually modern for the conservative audience at the time, he not only treated conventional descriptions of love, but also eroticism and sexuality. On this, he commented: "Love is a prisoner in the Arab world that I would like to free. I want to liberate the Arab soul, feeling and body with my poetry." Unlike classical Arabic poetry, Qabbani wrote his poems in familiar and sometimes straightforward language, which made his poetry accessible to a wide Arabic-reading public. He published more than 30 volumes of poetry as well as regular articles in the pan-Arab newspaper al-Hayat, published in London. Qabbani is also known for his verses about love that have been used by well-known Arab singers as lyrics for their songs.

The poet, playwright and essayist Muhammad al-Maghut (1934–2006) is considered one of the first authors of Arabic free verse by liberating his poems from the traditional forms and revolutionizing their structure. He wrote his first poems in prison on cigarette paper in the 1950s. Written as a personal memoir about the prison experience, this was later regarded as revolutionary poetry. Without any formal training, he used his vivid imagination, his innate command of words and his intuition. Further, he wrote for the theatre, television and cinema. Maghout's work combined satire with descriptions of social misery and the ethical decay among the region's rulers. His play for the theatre, Al-ousfour al ahdab (The Hunchback Bird), was originally a long poem written while hiding in a small, low-ceilinged room. This poem started as a dialogue that he later transformed into his first play. Al-Maghut also collaborated with Syrian actors Duraid Lahham and Nihad Qal'i to produce some of the region's most popular plays, such as Kasak ya Watan (Cheers to You, Nation), Ghorbeh (Alienation) and Dayat Tishreen (October Village).

==== 20th-century theatre and screenplays ====
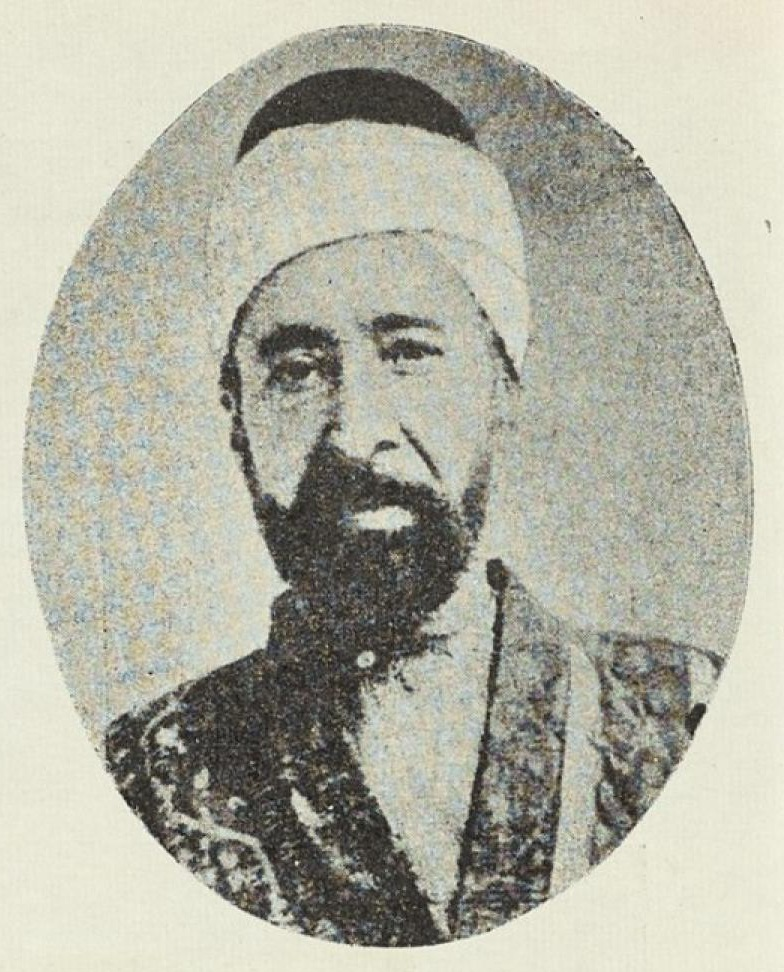
Historical photograph of Abu Khalil al-Qabbani

Theatre productions in European style presenting plays translated from French had already been performed in Damascus in the 1880s, when Salim and Hanna Anhouri opened a theatre hall in the Bab Touma district. The playwright Abu Khalil al-Qabbani (1833–1903) is credited with starting the development of theatre in Damascus in the 1870s. In addition to writing theatrical works, he formed a theatre company and opened a theatre in Damascus. In 1893, he performed with his company at the Chicago World Fair.

Modern Syrian theatre became popular after 1959, when the National Theatre Company was created. This company performed both in the Al-Hamra Theatre with 500 seats and in a theatre half that size, built for this purpose and named after Qabbani. His legacy is also reflected in the play An Evening with Abu Khalil Qabbani, by the Syrian playwright Saadallah Wannous (1941–1999).

Wannous has been considered as a major representative of Arab political drama since the 1970s. With some of his plays influenced by German writer Bertolt Brecht, Wannous reached audiences who did not usually read prose literature. He was also editor of the Arts and Culture section of the Syrian newspaper Al-Baath and the Lebanese daily As-Safir. Further, Wannous was a long-time director of the Syrian administration for music and theatre and editor of the theatre magazine Hayat al-masrah (Theater Life). He was also a founding member and lecturer of the Higher Institute of Dramatic Arts in Damascus.

Walid Ikhlasi (1935–2022), besides being known as author of short stories and novels, was a lecturer for dramatic arts and an innovative playwright. His style is characterized by an experimental, surrealistic and absurd nature, often mixed with a realistic tone. Mamdouh Adwan (1941–2004) was a prolific writer, lecturer and author for the theatre and television series. In addition to numerous plays and screenplays, his works include poetry collections, novels, newspaper articles and literary translations from English into Arabic.

Mohammad Al Attar (b. 1980) is a contemporary Syrian playwright and dramaturg who emigrated to Berlin after studying in Damascus. His plays, written in Arabic, have been performed in original and translated versions since the 2000s, including in theatres of the Middle East, the USA, Great Britain, France and Germany. Because his plays have dealt with the fate of refugees and the war in his country, he has been described as "an important chronicler of war-torn Syria." Similar fates and experiences are present in Liwaa Yazji's plays Goats (2017) and Q & Q (2016), performed at the Royal Court Theatre, London, and at the Edinburgh Fringe Festival.

=== 21st-century literature in the context of imprisonment, war and exile ===
Especially since the Syrian revolution and the ensuing Syrian civil war after 2011, a large number of novels, poems and corresponding non-fiction works inspired by imprisonment, torture and war, have been published. As of 2021, Syrian prison literature numbered more than 200 novels. Mustafa Khalifa (b. 1948) wrote his 2008 autobiographical novel The Shell based on his experience of 13 years as a political prisoner. Fawwaz Haddad (b. 1947) described the beginnings of the regional conflicts in his 2010 novel Soldiers of God, including the atrocities of the clashes between al-Qaeda fighters, U.S. soldiers and torture victims in Iraq. According to literary critic Anne-Marie McManus, these "contemporary works of art can shed much-needed light on the political, social and psychological contours of an uprising." (Note: See Anne-Marie McManus (2014), p. 323. "The marketing and reception of Syrian literature and cultural production in English since 2011 have upheld the premise that contemporary artworks can shed much-needed light on the political, social, and psychological contours of an uprising that continues to inspire and confound observers in Europe and the United States.")

Due to political repression and the ongoing war, many Syrian writers have fled abroad, creating works of Syrian exile literature. According to PEN International, more than 100 writers had been forced into exile since 2011, whereas the Syrian Writers Association (SWA), created as a response organisation to the official Syrian authors' association, the Arab Writers Union (AWU), counted 350 Syrian members as of 2014. Among many others, these include Salim Barakat and Faraj Bayrakdar (b. 1951) in Sweden, Jan Pêt Khorto (b. 1986) in Denmark, Rasha Omran (b. 1964) in Egypt, Ibrahim Samuel (b. 1951) and Shahla Ujayli (b. 1976) in Jordan, Fadi Azzam (b. 1973), Dima Wannous (b. 1982), Ghalia Qabbani and Haitham Hussein (b. 1978) in the United Kingdom, Hala Mohammad (b. 1959), Mustafa Khalifa (b. 1948), Samar Yazbek (b. 1970), Golan Haji (b. 1971) and Omar Youssef Souleimane (b. 1987) in France, as well as Nihad Sirees (b. 1950), Ali al-Kurdi (b. 1953), Yassin al Haj-Saleh (b. 1961), Jan Dost (b. 1965), Najat Abdul Samad (b. 1967), Aref Hamza (b. 1974), Osama Esber (b. 1963), Rosa Yassin Hassan (b. 1974), Liwaa Yazji (b. 1977), Aboud Saeed (b. 1983), Rasha Abbas (b. 1984) and Widad Nabi (b. 1985) in Germany. As these authors continue to write and publish their works in Arabic, they are banned in Syria. With regard to the expectations of Western audiences, some Syrian authors have complained, however, that their works are often not met with an interest primarily for literary reasons. Rather, their works are expected to meet Orientalist clichés, for example regarding the dangers of the flight into exile or the trope of the oppressed Arab woman.

Exiled in London, the writer and activist Dima Wannous published ironic stories about people in her home country under the title Dark Clouds over Damascus. In addition to her novels, Samar Yazbek also published the non-fiction book The Stolen Revolution. Travels to my devastated Syria. Liwaa Yazji's work as a writer of plays and screenplays is similarly marked by her reflections on the cruelty of the war in Syria, her situation as a writer in exile with family members in Syria who take sides against this war.

A 2022 literary study investigated the loss of a place called home for Syrians. Maha Hassan's Drums of Love and Ghassan Jubbaʿi's Qahwat Al-General served as examples of contemporary Syrian literature following the Syrian revolution. The study posited "that in both works a real sense of home proves unattainable" and "that the unattainable sense of home depicted in the novels marks such texts as a part of the enduring legacy of the Syrian revolution and its causes."

On 12 December 2024, only a few days after the fall of the Assad regime, McSweeney's quarterly published an anthology of Syrian authors, titled Aftershocks and co-edited by Alia Malek, Dave Eggers and Rita Bullwinkel. This collection of contemporary Syrian prose features works by authors including Rasha Abbas, Khalil Alrez, Mohammad Al Attar, Fadi Azzam, Jan Dost, Maha Hassan, Zakaria Tamer, Dima Wannous as well as others, whose writing had been translated for the first time.

=== Syrian women writers ===
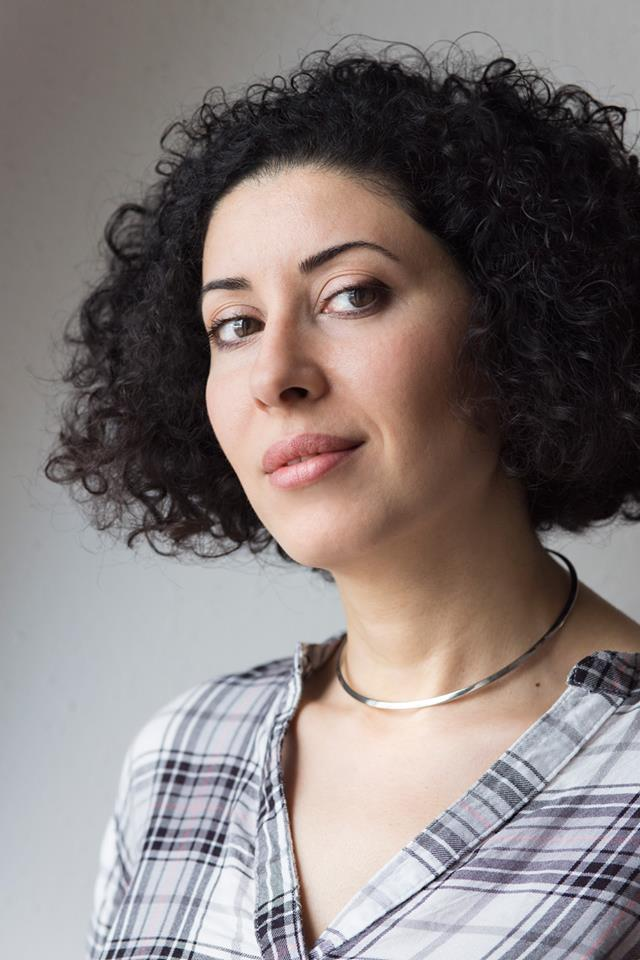
Liwaa Yazji in 2016

Many women writers have contributed to the development of modern Syrian and Arabic literature. The earliest works of modern literature and journalism by Syrian women writers since the late 19th century, for example by Mary Ajami, the founder of the Damascus Women's Literary Club, or by Maryana Marrash (1848–1919), showed tendencies of Romanticism and social realism. Since the 1950s, experimental novels and contemporary themes, such as discrimination against women, have been published by Ulfat Idlibi (1912–2007), Widad Sakakini (1913–1991), Salma Kuzbari (1923–2006), Colette Khoury (b. 1931) and Sania Saleh (1935–1985), among others. Women writers of the next generation include Samar al-'Aṭṭār (b. 1945), Ghada al-Samman, Hamida Nana (b. 1946), Marie Seurat (b. Bachi, 1949), Salwa Al Neimi, Ibtisam Ibrahim Teresa (b. 1959), Hayfa Baytar (b. 1960) and Maram al-Masri (b. 1962). These were followed by Lina Hawyani al-Hasan (b. 1975), Maha Hassan, Rasha Abbas, Rasha Omran, Ghalia Qabbani, Rosa Yaseen Hassan, Dima Wannous, Samar Yazbek and Liwaa Yazji.

In 2018, Najat Abdul Samad's work La Ma' Yarweeha won the Katara Prize for Arabic Novels, and fellow Syrian Maria Dadoush was awarded the Katara Prize the same year for her unpublished young adult novel The Planet of the Unbelievable. In January 2024, the novel Suleima's Ring by Syrian emigré in Spain Rima Bali was shortlisted for the International Prize for Arabic Fiction, a renowned literary award in the Arab world.

== Selected works by Syrian writers in English translation ==
- Omareen, Zaher, ed. (2025). The Book of Damascus – A City in Short Fiction (Anthology). Comma Press. ISBN 9781910974148.
- Adonis. Adonis: Selected Poems, translated by Khaled Mattawa. New Haven: Yale University Press, 2010.
- Azrak, Michel G. (ed.). Modern Syrian Short Stories. (English and Arabic), Three Continents Press, 1988.
- Bayrakdar, Faraj (2021). Alcalay, Ammiel; Taleghani, Shareah (eds.). A Dove in Free Flight. Upset Press.
- Barakat, Salim. Come, Take a Gentle Stab: Selected Poems, translated by Huda J. Fakhreddine and Jayson Iwen. The Arab List. London ; New York: Seagull Books, 2021.
- Diyab, Ḥanna, The Book of Travels, edited by Johannes Stephan, translated by Elias Muhanna, 2 vols. New York: New York University Press, 2021, ISBN 9781479810949
- Idilbi, Ulfat. Grandfather's Tale. Northampton, Mass.: Interlink Books, 1999.
- Ikhlaṣi, Walid. Whatever Happened to Antara and Other Stories, translated by Asmahan Sallah and Chris Ellery. Austin, TX: Center for Middle Eastern Studies at The University of Texas, 2004.
- Khalifah, Khalid. Death Is Hard Work, translated by Leri Price. London, U.K.: Faber & Faber, 2020.
- Khalifa, Moustafa. The Shell. Northampton, Mass.: Interlink Books, 2016.
- Maghuṭ, Muhammad, and Salma Khadra Jayyusi. The Fan of Swords: Poems, translated by May Jayyusi and Naomi Shihab Nye. Washington, D.C.: Three Continents Press, 1991.
- Malek, Alia; Bullwinkel, Dave; Bullwinkel, Rita, eds. (2024-12-12). Aftershocks. Contemporary Syrian Prose. San Francisco: McSweeney's. ISBN 978-1963270044.
- Minah, Hanna. Fragments of Memory: A Story of a Syrian Family, translated by Olive E. Kenny and Lorne Kenny. Northampton, Mass.: Interlink Books, 2004.
- Qabbani, Nizar. On Entering the Sea: The Erotic and Other Poetry of Nizar Qabbani, translated by Lena Jayyusi and Sharif Elmusa. New York, NY: Interlink Books, 2013.
- Samman, Ghadah. The Night of the First Billion, translated by Nancy N. Roberts. 1st ed. Middle East Literature in Translation. Syracuse, N.Y: Syracuse University Press, 2005.
- Seurat, Marie. Birds of Ill Omen. London: Quartet, 1990.
- Nihad Sirees. The Silence and the Roar. The Other Press, translated by Max Weiss, 2013.
- Tamer, Zakariya. Sour Grapes, translated by Alessandro Columbu and Mireia Costa Capallera. Middle East Literature in Translation. Syracuse, New York: Syracuse University Press, 2023.
- Wannous, Dimah. The Frightened Ones, translated by Elisabeth Jaquette. London: Harvel Secker, 2020.
- Yazbek, Samar. Planet of Clay, translated by Leri Price. New York: World Editions, 2021.
- Yazji, Liwaa. Goats, translated by Katharine Halls. London: Nick Hearne Books Limited, 2017.

== See also ==
- Culture of Syria
- History of Syria
- Syria Speaks: Art and Culture from the Frontline
