= Syrian Writers Association =

Non-governmental organization for Syrian writers and literature

The Syrian Writers Association (Arabic: رابطة الكتاب السوريين) is a professional, non-profit, non-governmental cultural organisation promoting Syrian literature and freedom of speech, based in London and registered in the United Kingdom.

== History ==
The Syrian Writers Association (SWA) was founded on 17 October 2012 in London, nine months after the outbreak of the Syrian civil war. It began its activities on 18 January 2013, as a self-described "democratic alternative" to the Arab Writers Union in Damascus which operates under the control of the Syrian government. The SWA aims to promote Syrian literature and writers as part of a social movement based on freedom of expression.

Among its founding members were Nouri Al-Jarrah, Hossam al-Din Mohamed and Khaldoun al-Shamaa in London, Sadiq Jalal al-Azm in Berlin, Yassin al-Haj Saleh in Damascus, Ali Kanaan and Mufid Najm in Abu Dhabi, and Faraj Bayrakdar in Sweden. The Association aims to "support and develop the national democratic culture in its various Arabic, Kurdish and other cultures in Syria, defend the legal status of the writers and preserve their rights and dignity." Further, it strives to support the intellectual and cultural goals for which it was established.

In 2021, the SWA named 390 Syrian regular members, as well as other Arab writers and journalists as honorary members, including, but not limited to the following writers: Nouri Al-Jarrah, Sadiq Jalal al-Azm, Yassin al-Haj Saleh, Faraj Bayrakdar, Khalaf Ali Alkhalaf, Farouk Mardam Bey, Fawaz Haddad, Maha Hassan, Michel Kilo, Nihad Sirees, Burhan Ghalioun, Taisier Khalaf, Jan Dost, Khalid Khalifa, Dima Wannous, Razan Zaitouneh, Rasha Omran, Rosa Yasseen Hasan, Salim Barakat, Tayyeb Tizini, Aref Dalilah, Aisha Arnaout and others.

The SWA publishes a journal titled Awrāq (Pages).
