= Zakaria Tamer =

Syrian writer

- زكريا تامر
- Born: January 2, 1931 (age 95); Damascus, First Syrian Republic
- Occupations: Short story writer, newspaper columnist, newspaper editor
- Writing career
- Period: 1960–2016
- Genres: short story, children's literature
- Notable works: Tigers On The Tenth Day and Other Stories, Sour Grapes
- Notable awards: Mahmoud Darwish Award for Freedom and Creativity

Zakaria Tamer (Arabic: زكريا تامر, romanized: Zakariyyā Tāmir; born January 2, 1931), also spelled Zakariya Tamir, is a Syrian short story writer. He is one of the most widely read and translated short story writers of modern Syrian literature, as well as one of the foremost authors of children's stories in Arabic. He also worked as a freelance journalist, writing satirical columns in Arabic newspapers.

His volumes of short stories are often reminiscent of folktales and renowned for their relative simplicity on the one hand and the complexity of their many potential references on the other. They may have a sharp edge and are often a surrealistic protest against political or social oppression and exploitation. Most of Zakaria Tamer's stories deal with people's inhumanity towards each other, the oppression of the poor by the rich and of the weak by the strong. The political and social problems of his own country, Syria, and of the Arab world, are reflected in the satirical style typical of his writing.

His first stories were published in 1957. Since then he has published eleven collections of short stories, two collections of satirical articles and numerous children's books. His works have been translated into several languages, with three collections in English, Tigers on the Tenth Day, Breaking Knees and Sour Grapes.

For his works, Tamer was awarded several Arab and international literary prizes.

== Biography ==
=== Early life ===
Zakaria Tamer was born in 1931 in the Al-Basha district of Damascus. He was forced to leave school in 1944, at the age of thirteen in order to help provide for his family. He was apprenticed to a blacksmith as a locksmith in a factory in the Al-Basha district of Damascus. At the same time, as an autodidact, he spent many hours reading various books, he became interested in politics and was encouraged by contact with intellectuals to continue his education at night school. He read voraciously and was provoked by his reading, as he later said in an interview, "to create a voice which [he] hadn't been able to find [there]". His intention was to represent in his writing the very poor majority of men and women in Syria, with their joyless and restricted existence.

He began his literary career in 1957, when he published some stories in Syrian journals. His first manuscript was noticed by Yusuf al-Khal, the poet, critic and editor of the magazine Shi'r ("Poetry") which at the time was acting as midwife to the birth of modern Arabic poetry. The talent that lay behind the poetical prose of these stories, was so unlike anything being written in Arabic at the time, that Al-Khal decided to publish it, this became his first collection of short stories, which was entitled The Neighing of the White Steed.

The collection brought him considerable attention and repute amount readers and critics.

=== 1960–1981 ===
Following his literary success, which was reflected in the good reception of his first collection, he left his job as a blacksmith and embarked on a new career, as government official, as well as editor of several journals, including the cultural periodicals Al Mawqif al-Adabi, and Al Marifah, and the children's magazine Usamah.

He was instrumental in the establishment of the Syrian Writers Union in Syria 1968. He was elected member of the executive bureau responsible for the publishing and print, and was vice-president of the Union for four years.

In 1980 he was dismissed from editing the periodical al-Marifah, published by the Syrian Ministry of Culture, as a result of the publication of extracts from Abd al-Rahman al-kawakibi’s (1849–1902) book, Tabai al istibadad (“The Characteristics of Despotism, 1900), in which the author denounced tyranny and called for freedom. As a result of his dismissal, Tamer decided to travel to London, leaving his home country of Syria.

=== 1980s onwards ===
From 1981-1982 he took charge of Al Dustoor magazine as managing editor, he went on to be culture editor of Al Tadhamon magazine (1983–1988) and then became managing editor of Al Naqid magazine (1988–1993), and culture editor at Riyadh Al Rayes Publishing House. He also wrote for various newspapers and periodicals published in London, including Al-Quds Al-Arabi.

In January 2012, Zakaria Tamer decided to venture into Facebook, creating a page titled المهماز (Al-Mihmaz) “The Spur”. The page contains daily articles detailing his continuing literary journey with its political and cultural dimensions. Most recently the focus has been on the Syrian uprising.

In 2023, his collection of stories Sour Grapes was published in English - twenty years after the original Arabic publication.

== Quotes ==
We are deceiving ourselves if we believe that a literary work written and published in a country where 70 per cent of the population is illiterate, can change the political and social life of the country..it is up to political organization..and not to romantic literature.. to change the present situation.

== Awards ==
- 2001: Sultan Bin Ali Al Owais Cultural Foundation: Prize of Stories Novels & Drama
- 2002: Honoured and invested with the Syrian Order of Merit
- 2009: Awarded the Blue Metropolis Montreal International Literary prize
- 2015: Mahmoud Darwish Award for Freedom and Creativity

== Themes in writing ==
A common theme in his writing has been that the strongest of us can gradually be broken and tamed by those who wield the whip of power. Those who rule, Zakaria Tamer tells us in many a story, while devoid of all the noble qualities that should be theirs, possess the intuitive awareness of how to use the carrot and the stick. Muhammad al-Maghut, a well known Arab critic, once contrasted him with Charles Darwin: one showing how humans developed from monkeys, the other showing how humans could be manipulated into becoming monkeys.

Another favorite theme, as seen in such stories as "The Stale Loaf" and the "Room with Two Beds", is the sexual frustration of the young in the Arab world and the toll that is exacted - particularly from the women - when sexual taboos are breached, or are thought to have been breached.

Though humor is not one of the ingredients of these stories, the writer does allow himself an occasional sardonic grin at the forms of injustice to which man is subjected by his rulers, his fellow men and the circumstances of lives enclosed in routine of ill-rewarded work and unfulfillment. Zakaria Tamer's world is Orwellian though unmistakably Arab. The secret police, with their physical brutalities, feature in many of the stories, as for instance in the dark-humored "A summary of What Happened to Mohammed al-Mahmoudi", where a harmless old man finds that even in death he is not immune from their attention.

Tamer often revisits themes using a direct writing style.

== Works ==
Until 2005, Tamer has published eleven collections of stories, two collections of satirical articles and dozens of children's books.

=== Short story collections ===
- The Neighing of the White Steed, (1960) صهيل الجواد الابيض Ṣahīl al-Jawād al-Abyaḍ
- Spring In The Ashes, (1963) ربيع في الرماد Rabīʿ fī l-Ramād
- The Thunder, (1970) الرعد Ar-Raʿd
- Damascus Fire, (1973) دمشق الحرائق Dimashq al-Ḥarāʼiq
- Tigers on the Tenth Day, (1978) النمور في اليوم العاشر al-Numūr fī l-Yawm al-ʿĀshir
- Noah's Summons, (1994),نداء نوح Nidāʼ Nūḥ
- We Shall Laugh, (1998) سنضحك Sanaḍḥak
- IF!, (1998) أف!
- Sour Grapes, (2000) الحصرم Al-Ḥiṣrim
- Breaking Knees, (2002) تكسير ركب Taksīr Rukab
- The Hedgehog, (2005) القنفذ Al-Qunfuḏ
- The Regret of Horse, (2018)ندم الحصان Nadamul Hisan

=== Collections of satirical articles ===
- Glories, Arabs, Glories, (1986) Amjad Ya Arab amjad
- The Victim's Satire Of His Killer, (2003)

=== Other collections ===
- Why the River Fell Silent, (1973) لماذا سكت النهر Limāḏā Sakata al-Nahr
- The Flower Spoke to the Bird, (1978) قالت الوردة للسنونو Qālit al-Warda Lilsununu

=== In translation ===
- Tigers On The Tenth Day and Other Stories, (1985) translated by Denys Johnson-Davies, Quartet Books
- Breaking Knees, (2008), translated by Ibrahim Muhawi (Reading, UK: Garnet Publishing)
- The Hedgehog: A Modern Arabic Novella, (2009) translated by Brian O'Rourke, Denys Johnson-Davies, American University Cairo Press, ISBN 9789774162558
- The Children Laugh, (2017), translated to Hebrew by Alon Fragman, published by Maktoob Series.
- Sour Grapes, (2023) translated by Alessandro Columbu and Mireia Costa Capallera, Syracuse University Press

=== Editorial work ===
- 1960-1963, Writers and Publishing Dept. at Syria Ministry of Culture
- 1963-1965, editor of weekly Al Mawqef Al Arabi, Syria
- 1965-1966, Screenwriter for Jeddah TV, KSA
- 1967, started his work at Syria Ministry of Information
- 1967-1970, Head of Drama Department at Syrian TV
- 1970-1971, Editor-in-Chief of kids Rafi magazine, Syria
- 1972-1975, Editor-in-Chief of Al Mawqef Al Adabi magazine, Syria
- 1975-1977, Editor-in-Chief of kids Osama magazine, Syria
- 1978-1980, Editor-in-Chief of Al Ma’arifa magazine, Syria
- 1980-1981, Syria Ministry of Culture
- 1981-1982, Managing editor of Al Dustoor magazine, London
- 1983-1988, Culture editor of Al Tadhamon magazine, London
- 1988-1993, Managing editor of Al Naqid magazine and culture editor at Riyadh Al Rayes Publishing House, London

=== Other activities ===
- Co-founded Arab Writers Union in Syria 1969, member of its Executive Bureau, and Deputy Chairman for four years
- Jury member of Arab and international literary competitions

=== Newspaper columns ===
- 1989-1994, daily articles for Al-Quds Al-Arabi newspaper, London
- 2002, Azzaman Newspaper
- 2006, Al Thawra Newspaper (Revolution), Syria

== See also ==
- Arabic Literature
- Syrian literature - Modern prose writing
- List of short story authors
