= Widad Nabi =

Syrian-Kurdish poet and writer (born 1985)

- Native name: وداد نبي
- Born: 1985 (age 40–41) Kobani, Syria
- Occupation: Writer, poet
- Period: 2013–present
- Subject: War in Syria, exile as refugee
- Notable awards: Weiter Schreiben Scholarship Wiesbaden, Germany

Widad Nabi (Arabic: وداد نبي; born 1985 in Kobane, Syria) is a Syrian Kurdish poet and writer who has been living in exile in Berlin, Germany, since 2015. She writes her poems in Arabic, and some of them having been published in French and German. In addition to writing about her experience of the political situation in Syria and her later life as a refugee, she has advocated for women's rights - both in Syria and also in Western Europe. Her works are part of contemporary Syrian exile literature.

== Life and career ==
Nabi was born in Kobani, the capital of the district Ain al-Arab in northern Syria near the border with Turkey. The district is part of the Kurdish settlement area in Syria, also known as Rojava. She graduated with a bachelor's degree in Economics from the University of Aleppo. During her time in Syria, she wrote for magazines and newspapers, and since her flight to Berlin in 2015, her essays about her exile have appeared in several German media. Further essays about topics such as the personal choice of Muslim women wearing a hijab or not and her relationship with modern German literature were published by the German weekly Die Zeit.

Nabi writes her poems in Arabic, the official language of the educational system in Syria. In 2013, she published her first book Time for Love, Time for War in Aleppo. In 2016, this was followed by her Syria and the Futility of Death in Beirut. In German translation, her poems have been published in three poetry collections and anthologies.

== Reception ==
In 2019, Nabi was invited to the Berlin International Literature Festival. In 2018 and 2020, she was honoured with literary awards by the German cities of Rheinsberg and Wiesbaden.

On the occasion of the 2021 International Frankfurt Book Fair, Al Jazeera Arabic called Nabi's work "at the forefront of the new Arabic poetry, by virtue of the rich poetic experience she accumulated at the level of language, symbol, image, and the extent of their fusion with the Syrian reality." In 2022, pro-opposition Syrian television network Syria.tv published an article about Nabi's work, including interpretations of her poems.

== Selected works ==
=== In German translation ===
- Eine Frau am Spreeufer: Geschichte und Gedichte. Sven Murmann Verlag, Hamburg, 2017, ISBN 978-3-96196-019-4
- Kurz vor dreißig, küss mich. Ausgewählte Gedichte (Arabic/German). Translated from Arabic by Suleman Taufiq. Sujet Verlag, Bremen, 2020, ISBN 978-3-96202-066-8
- Unsichtbare Brüche. Gedichte. Translated from Arabic by Suleman Taufiq. Sujet Verlag, Bremen, 2021, ISBN 978-3-96202-094-1

=== In anthologies ===
- Weg sein - hier sein. An anthology with works by authors living in exile in Germany. With an introduction by Sherko Fatah. Secession Verlag, Berlin, 2016, ISBN 978-3-905951-97-4
- Khalid Al-Maaly (ed.) Die Flügel meines schweren Herzens. Lyrik arabischer Dichterinnen vom 5. Jahrhundert bis heute. Translated from Arabic by Khalid Al-Maaly and Heribert Becker. Manesse Verlag, Zürich, 2017, ISBN 978-3-7175-4092-2

=== In French anthologies ===
- Atfah, Lina, et al. Les Fruits de L’obscurité: Lina Atfah, Rasha Habbal, Widad Nabi, Maha Becker, Fadwa Souleimane. Bilingual edition Arabic - French, Atelier de l’agneau, 2018. ISBN 9782374280219.
- Masri, Maram al-, (ed.) L’amour Au Temps de L’insurrection et de La Guerre: Anthologie de La Poésie Syrienne d’Aujourd’hui. Montreuil: Le Temps des cerises, no date. ISBN 9782370710321
