= Lina Hamdan =

Syrian poet and writer

- Native name: لينا حمدان
- Born: April 2, 1956 (age 69); Aleppo, Syria
- Occupation: poet; writer; cultural administrator
- Language: Arabic
- Education: University of Damascus; Bachelor in Arabic Language and Literature
- Period: 1990–Present
- Spouse: Ibrahim Al-Bouzah (1978)
- Children: 4

Lina Mounir Hamdan (Arabic: لينا منير حمدان; born 1956) is a Syrian poet and literary figure based in Tartus, Syria. Hamdan has published multiple poetry collections since 1990 and is a prominent member of the Arab Writers Union since 2000. Her poetry is acclaimed for its free-flowing style and emotional vulnerability.

== Early life and education ==
Born in Aleppo, Syria, Hamdan moved between the Syrian cities of Damascus and Homs in her early life. Her father, poet and officer Mounir Hamdan, motivated her to explore Arabic poetry and literature from an early age. She graduated from the University of Damascus with a degree in Arabic literature.

== Career ==
She was an Arabic secondary school teacher and later principal in Homs before retiring and moving to Tartus at the dawn of the Syrian civil war.

During her time as an educator, Hamdan organized school events and end of year festivals to attract and motivate young talent. She became in constant contact with the Arab Writers Union, newspapers and municipal cultural centers. After multiple positions with the Union in Homs, Hamdan is now the secretary of the Union's Tartus branch and organizes events with the municipality.

Hamdan has written and published five poetry collections both during and after her professional career alongside short poems on her social media platforms. Beyond the Fog was released in 2023 after a three year sabbatical.
