= Haitham Hussein =

Syrian writer

- هيثم حسين
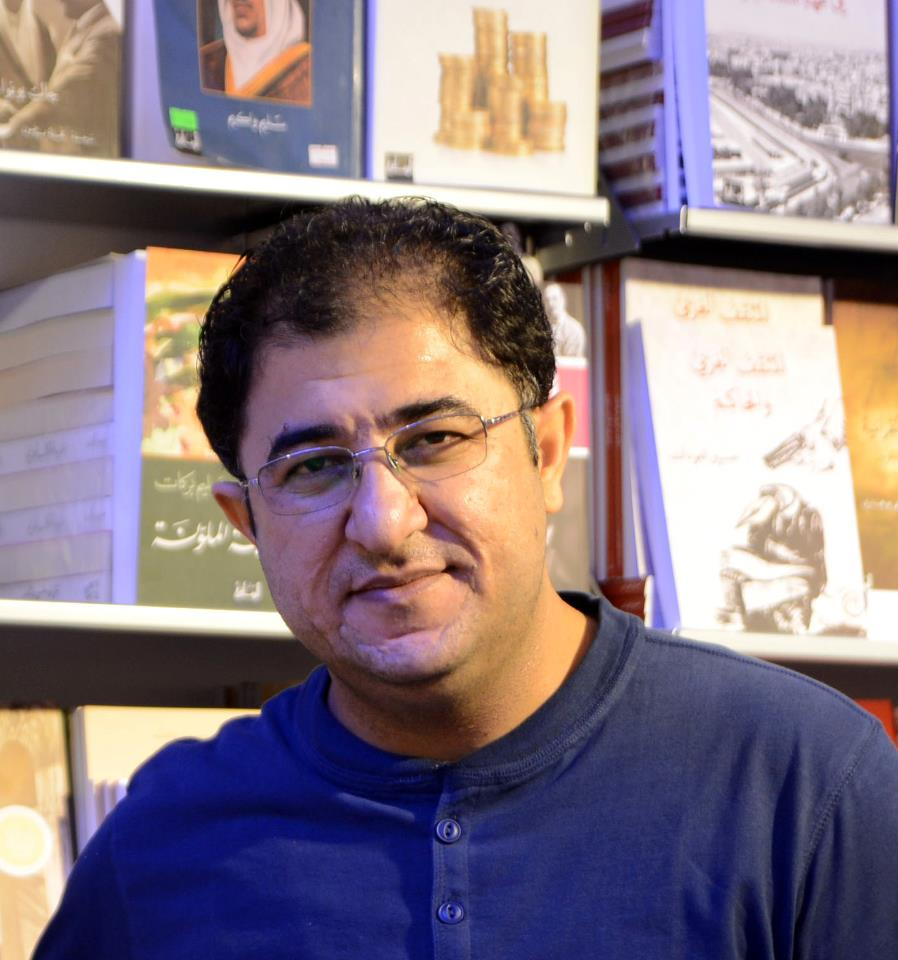
- Born: November 16, 1978 (age 47); Amuda, Syria
- Citizenship: Syrian
- Occupations: Novelist and Journalist.
- Spouse: Nesrin Ahmad
- Children: Heivy and Rose
- Writing career
- Language: Arabic
- Website: alriwaya.net

Haitham Hussein (Arabic: هيثم حسين; born November 16, 1978) is a Syrian-Kurdish novelist, literary critic and journalist. A long-time cultural journalist for major Arabic newspapers, he has published five novels in Arabic. In 2012, he had to flee from Syria due to the ongoing Syrian civil war and continuous censorship of his works that deal with life in the Kurdish region of Syria.

== Biography ==
Hussein was born on November 16, 1978, in the city of Amuda in the province of Hasaka, Syria. He worked for years as a freelance journalist specialized in cultural criticism for major Arabic newspapers, such as Al-Hayat, As-Safir, Al-Bayan, Al-Quds, and Al-Arabi as well as for several other Arabic newspapers and journals. As the Syrian government does not acknowledge Kurdish identity and prohibited his novels, he had to publish them informally.

Hussein lived near Damascus, but after his house in the Eastern Ghouta was bombarded, he fled the country in mid-2012 to live in the United Kingdom. In 2015, Hussein founded the bilingual Al-Riwaya.net website, focusing on his main fields of interest, the Arabic novel and literary criticism. In his own novels, he has chosen a modern style.

He is married and has a two daughters.

== Novels ==
- Aram: the Descendant of Unspoken Pains (2007)
- Hostages of Memory (2010)
- Needle of Horror (2014)
- A Weed in Paradise (2017)

== See also ==
- Syrian literature
- Modern Arabic literature
