= Fadi Azzam =

Syrian writer, born 1973

Fadi Azzam (Arabic: فادي عزام; born 1973, As-Suwayda, Syria) is a Syrian novelist and poet. Two of his novels in Arabic have been longlisted for the International Prize for Arabic Fiction. In 2011, his debut novel Sarmada was published in English and in 2020 in a German edition. After the outbreak of the war in Syria, he went into exile in the United Kingdom. His work is part of contemporary Syrian literature in the context of war and imprisonment.

== Life and career ==
Azzam was born in As-Suwayda in southern Syria in 1973 and went to university in Damascus, graduating in 1998. He has published in Arabic newspapers and magazines, and he reported on arts and culture for Al Quds al-Arabi from 2007 to 2009. Further, he has published opinion columns in The New York Times and a number of newspapers across the Middle East and Arabian Gulf.

He has also worked with visual media, such as documentaries and cartoons.

In 2012, his debut novel Sarmada, about a Druze community in Syria, was longlisted for the International Prize for Arabic Fiction. It was also translated into English and German. He was longlisted again in 2018 for his novel Bait Huddud (Huddud's house), translated into English in 2024.

Some of his prose poems, such as "If You Are Syrian These Days …" and "This is Damascus, You Sons of Bitches" were translated by Ghada Alatrash and published by literary magazine ArabLit.

== Selected works ==
- سرمدة : رواية (Sarmada, a novel). Thaqāfah lil-Nashr wa-al-Tawzīʻ, 2011. ISBN 9789948446231
  - Translated into English as Sarmada by Adam Talib (Arabia Books, 2011). ISBN 9781906697341
- رحلة الى قبور ثلاثة شعراء : آرثر رامبو، فرانز كافكا، فيرناندو بيسوا، برفقة رياض الصالح الحسين (A trip to the graves of three poets, Arthur Rimbaud, Franz Kafka, Fernando Pessoa, accompanied by Riad Al-Saleh Al-Hussein). Jadāwil lil-Nashr wa-al-Tarjamah wa-al-Tawzīʻ, 2016. ISBN 9786144183267
- بيت حدد : رواية (Hudud's house, a novel). Dār al-Ādāb, 2017. ISBN 9789953895512
  - Translated into English as Huddud's House by Ghada Alatrash (Interlink Books, 2024), ISBN 9781623711153
- الوصايا (The wills). Hachette Antoine, 2018. ISBN 9786144691649
- The Calamity of the I, translated by Ghada Alatrash in Asymptote magazine
- Poem "If you are Syrian these Days", translated by Ghada Alatrash
- Poem "This is Damascus, You Sons of Bitches", translated by Ghada Alatrash

== See also ==
- Syrian literature - Modern prose writing
