= Al Karmel =

Arabic literary magazine (1981–2008)

- Editor-in-chief: Mahmoud Darwish
- Categories: Literary magazine
- Founder: Mahmoud Darwish
- Founded: 1981
- Final issue: 2008
- Country: Lebanon; Cyprus; France; Palestine
- Based in: Beirut; Nicosia; Paris; Ramallah
- Language: Arabic

Al Karmel was a literary magazine which existed between 1981 and 2008. The magazine is known for its founder and editor Mahmoud Darwish, a Palestinian writer. It was based in various cities during its run.

== History and profile ==
Al Karmel was established by Mahmoud Darwish in Beirut, Lebanon, in 1981. Darwish edited the magazine until his death. Its publisher was Al Karmel Cultural Foundation. Elias Khoury was the editor of the magazine between 1981 and 1982.

Following the Palestine Liberation Organization's departure from Beirut in 1982 the magazine's headquarters moved to Nicosia, Cyprus, where it was printed until 1996. The associate editor of the magazine when it was headquartered in Nicosia was Salim Barakat, a Syrian writer. Next Darwish published the magazine in Paris. Then it was restarted in Ramallah, Palestine.

Darwish published many poems in Al Karmel, including prose poems. One of his prose poems was about the events occurred on 6 June 1982 when Israel invaded Lebanon and was featured in the magazine in 1986. Edward Said was a regular contributor of the magazine, and through his literary critics Said became known in the Arab world. Said's contributions also made Mahmoud Darwish's poems much more eminent. Arab and Israeli writers contributed to the title in addition to international ones such as Russell Banks, J. M. Coetzee and José Saramago. The magazine featured short stories and essays written by the Palestinian writer Asia Shibli.

The headquarters of Al Karmel in Ramallah was destroyed by the Israeli army in April 2002.

Al Karmel folded in 2008.
