= Ghamar Mahmoud =

Syrian screenwriter and novelist

- Born: Homs, Syria
- Occupations: Writer, screenwriter, novelist
- Awards: Won the Katara Prize for Arabic Novel for his novel "Babel's Mirror"

Ghamar Mahmoud, (Arabic: غمار محمود) a Syrian writer and novelist, was born in 1980. He has published several novels and plays including Babel’s Mirror which was awarded the Katara Prize for Arabic Novel in the category of unpublished novel in 2017. Also, he is a screenwriter for short films including the children's film, Cannon’s Early Winds which took part in the International Festival of Carthage in 2012.

== Education and career ==
Mahmoud was born in Homs, Syria on 15 June 1980. He graduated from Al-Baath University in Homs and obtained a BA in Education and Psychology. Then, he moved to Russia to study cinematography at Saint Petersburg State Institute of Film and Television. After his graduation in 2008, Mahmoud worked as a cinematographer at the General Film Organization. In 2001, he published his first novel "Tales of the Last Hour" which was published by Dar Al-Tawhidi. He has published five novels, including "The Blue Weather" in 2006, and "Babe’s Mirror" which was awarded the Katara Prize for Arabic Novels in 2017. He has also written screenplays for short films including "The Landmarks of Damascus in a Thousand and One Nights" which was shown on Talaqi TV, and the children's film "Cannon’s Early Winds" which took part in the International Festival of Carthage in Tunis, 2012.

== Works ==
=== Novels ===
- "Tales of the Last Hour" (original title: Hikayat Al Sa’a Al Akheera), 2001
- “The Blue Weather” (original title: Al Taqs Al Azraq), 2006
- “Babel’s Mirror” (original title: Miraat Babel), 2016
- “A Trip on the Ship Shams” (original title: Rihlat Al Safeena Shams), 2018
- “An Adventure on the Way to India” (original title: Mogamara ala Tareeq al Hind), 2019

Plays

- “Cities Dawn” (original title: Fajr al Mudon), 2005
- "Afternoon” (original title: Baad al-thuhr), 2005
- Abu Al-Fadl Al-Jabri, 2008

Series and short films

- “Cannon’s Early Winds” (original title: Riyah Kanon Al Mubakira), 2012
- “Colors’ World” (original title: Alaam al Alwan).

== Awards ==
He won several awards:

- Dar Al-Naji Noman Award in Lebanon for his play “Abu Al-Fadl Al-Jabri”, 2008
- Won the Mustafa Azouz competition for children's literature for his novel “The Trip of the Ship Shams” in 2015.
- Won the Katara Prize for Arabic Novel for his novel "Babel’s Mirror”

== See also ==
- Syrian literature - Modern prose writing
