= Syria Speaks =

Anthology of writing and art by Syrian authors

Syria Speaks : Art and Culture from the Frontline
- Author: Malu Halasa, Zaher Omareen, Nawara Mahfoud (eds)
- Language: Arabic, English translation
- Publisher: London: Saqi Books
- Publication place: United Kingdom
- English publication date: 2014
- Pages: 312
- Awards: English PEN award
- ISBN: 9780863567872
- Website: www.saqibooks.com/book/syria-speaks/

Syria Speaks: Art and Culture from the Frontline is a 2014 collection of writing and art published by Saqi Books. The works in the book are by more than fifty Syrian artists, writers, activists and anonymous collectives.

== Content ==
The essays were written at some point during the early Syrian civil war, approximately in 2012 and 2013, when there were peaceful protests against the Bashar al-Assad regime. According to Ursula Lindsey, writing for the London Review of Books blog, "their hope and defiance seem out of date", with most of the fifty authors having fled the country by 2014. The book reports the violent response of the Assad regime to peaceful protests, including wartime rape, imprisonment, and torture.

The book includes various visual and textual media, including: stories, poems, memoirs, stencils, songs, cartoons, photography, poster art, graffiti, cellphone footage, and finger puppets. Artists featured in the book include Sulafa Hijazi and Ali Ferzat.

== Incident ==
On 25 July 2016 Faizah Shaheen, a British Muslim, was detained after she had read the book on an international flight. Cabin crew had reported suspicious activity after Shaheen had read Syria Speaks on a Thomson Airways flight to Turkey. After her two-week holiday, Shaheen was detained on re-entry into the United Kingdom at Doncaster Airport. South Yorkshire Police detained her for 15 minutes for questioning under the UK Terrorism Act 2000.

Labour Party MP Keith Vaz criticised the airline for over-reacting. After controversy sparked by the incident, sales of Syria Speaks soared, necessitating a reprint. Jo Glanville, director of English PEN, urged people to read the book in public places as a form of protest against the "counter-extremism" of anti-terrorism laws.

== Reception ==
Peter Clark, writing for Asian Affairs, calls Syria Speaks "an informed and moving record" of "unspectacular and non-violent resistance" against the Syrian government that is happening behind the scenes of the Syrian civil war. Body Tonkin of The Independent similarly calls it "an invaluable and deeply moving testimony to resistance in word and image". According to Ursula Lindsey: "The book provides a way of listening to and looking at the conflict when the horror of it makes many of us avert our gaze."

Syria Speaks won the English PEN award.

== See also ==
- Literature from the "Axis of Evil"
- Syrian literature
