= Salwa Al Neimi =

Syrian journalist and literary writer, living in France

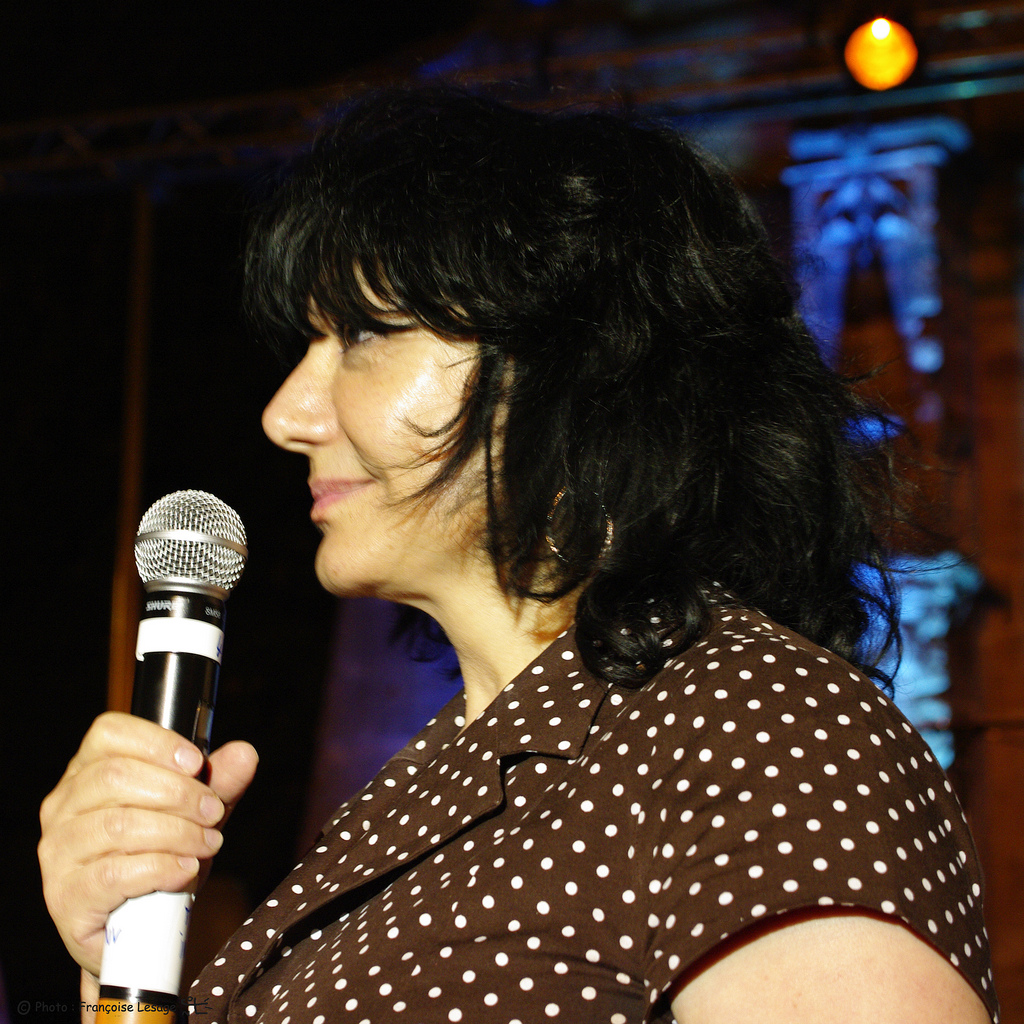
Salwa Al Neimi

Salwa Al Neimi, also Salwa al-Nuʿaymī (Arabic: سلوى النعيمي) is a Syrian writer, poet and journalist living in France. Originally from Damascus, she is known for her outspoken views on topics which are taboo in the Muslim world, particularly female sexuality. In 2007 she published her debut novel, The Proof of the Honey, which was noted for its liberal treatment of female sexuality. Some of her works have been published in English, French and other languages.

== Biography ==
Al Neimi studied at the University of Damascus in 1975 and subsequently at Paris-Sorbonne University in Paris, where she received a postgraduate degree in Arabic literature. She commenced work as a journalist, and her interviews of several prominent Arab and Western writers were published in Arabic journals such as Al-Karmel, Masharef and Kull al-ʿArab. In 1997, she was appointed chief press secretary of the Arab World Institute in Paris.

== Works ==
Notable works include the poetry collections Dhahaba alladhīna uḥibbuhum (The Ones I Love Passed Away), published in 1999, and Ajdādī al-qatalah (My Ancestors, the Assassins) published in 2001, both of which explore women fighting tradition in the Islamic world.

In 2007, she published her debut novel, Burhān al-ʿasal (The Proof of the Honey), which was successful due to its liberal presentation of female sexuality and erotic language. Al Neimi uses Arabic erotic literary traditions and conventions in her writing, which is a major theme of her novels. Further, she stated “No other language could excite me that way. Arabic, for me, is the language of sex.” The book has been banned in several countries such as Syria, as well as being removed from the iTunes store due to the nude bottom on the cover of the book. The novel was translated into English, French and several other languages, and her work received a review in Le Monde in 2008. In a 2009 interview, she said that writing about sexual freedom is "the result of invoking Arab and Muslim heritage".

Her book of short stories, Kitāb al-asrār (2010; The Book of Secrets), has been noted for her criticism of hypocrisy and the "liberating power of the written word". In 2012, she published Shibh al-Jazīrah al-ʿArabiyyah (The Arabian Peninsula), a semiautobiographical account of her earlier life with her Christian mother and a Muslim father, and of her concern for the future of Syria.

== See also ==
- Syrian literature - Syrian women writers

== Literature ==
- Censi, Martina (2016-05-02). Le Corps dans le roman des écrivaines syriennes contemporaines (in French). Leiden Boston: BRILL. pp. 133–149. ISBN 978-90-04-31525-9.
