= Rima Bali =

Syrian writer of modern Arabic fiction

- ريما بالي
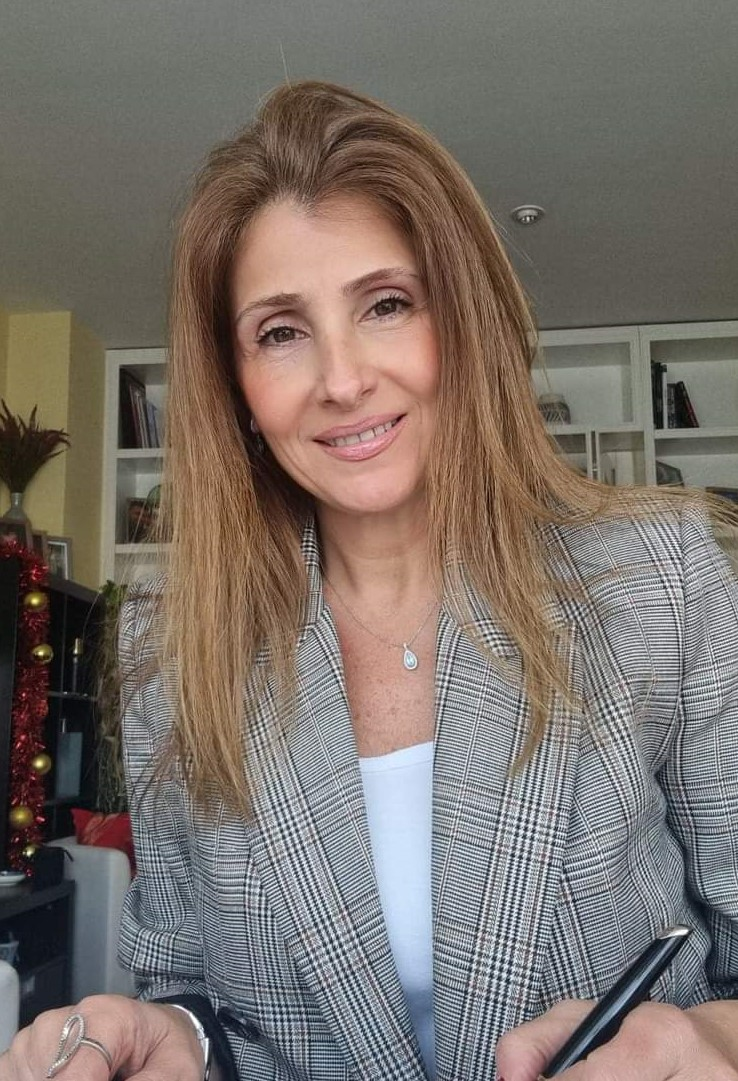
- Rima Bali in 2023
- Born: June 20, 1969 (age 57); Aleppo
- Education: University of Aleppo
- Occupation: fiction writer
- Writing career
- Period: 2018-present
- Genre: contemporary Arabic fiction
- Notable work: Suleima’s Ring (novel)
- Notable awards: 2024 shortlist for International Prize for Arabic Fiction

Rima Bali (Arabic: ريما بالي, born 1969 in Aleppo, Syria) is a Syrian writer of contemporary Arabic fiction. The author of four novels, she is mostly known for having been shortlisted for the 2024 International Prize for Arabic Fiction (IPAF) based in Abu Dhabi and mentored by the Booker Prize Foundation in London.

== Biography ==
Bali was born and grew up in Aleppo, a metropolis in northern Syria that has been gravely affected by the Syrian civil war. She studied Commerce and Economics at the University of Aleppo and later worked in the tourism sector, managing a hotel in the historical centre of Aleppo until the outbreak of the war in the city. During the first three years of the conflict, she continued to live in Aleppo, but then emigrated in 2015 to Madrid, Spain. In 2023, her 2018 novel غدي الأزرق (The Blue Sunflower) was published in Spanish as El Girasol Azul.

Bali started writing at a young age, encouraged by her family. Asked about her literary influences, she mentioned works from her father's library by Gibran Khalil Gibran, Nietzsche, Sartre, Naguib Mahfouz and some classics of world and Arabic literature. Her literary creations draw from a blend of cultural experiences and perspectives, based on her life in both Syria and Spain. Set between Aleppo and the Spanish city of Toledo, an important medieval center of translations from Classical Arabic into Medieval Latin, her novel خاتم سليمى (Suleima's Ring) is a modern-day story told by multiple narrators about Lucas, a Spanish photographer of Jewish and Christian background, and Syrian protagonists Selma and Shams al-Din.

== Works ==
Original titles in Arabic with English translation

- ميلاجرو (Miracle), 2016
- غدي الأزرق (The Blue Sunflower) 2018, Spanish translation by Victoria Khraiche Ruiz-Zorrilla, El Girasol Azul (2023), ISBN 978-84-1369-613-3.
- Contribution to the Arabic/Danish anthology Exile: New Arab Voices, 2019
- خاتم سليمى (Suleima’s Ring), 2022
- ناي في التخت الغربي (Nay in a Western Orchestra), 2023
- لم نأكل التفاح (We didn't eat the Apples), 2025

== Critical reception ==
Rima Bali's works have received positive critical responses, both in Arabic and Spanish media.

=== Reception in Arabic media ===
In a July 2023 interview with the cultural platform of London-based Al-Araby Al-Jadeed news magazine, Bali was cited as one of the writers with a distinct female style in modern Arabic literature. About the relationship between history and creative writing, Bali remarked:"

[...] the war took place in Syria, but reading about this war is a process that dozens may disagree on. This is the flesh and blood that every novelist brings from the dust of history to write his novel according to his own vision. [Our soul] is the one who carries her chains with her from her homelands. If exile is a prison with open skies, home has always been a prison without sky, and I train my soul today to fly in this available sky so that one day it may get rid of its chains.

An August 2023 literary review in the Lebanese newspaper An-Nahar of her novel Nay in a Western Orchestra praised her technique of multiple narratives and remarkable innovation. This story based on a Syrian refugee, confronted with his former war-time experience in Aleppo and feeling isolated in exile, was called "a new image of the Syrian literary character."

In January 2024, Suleima’s Ring was shortlisted for the International Prize for Arabic Fiction (IPAF), the most prestigious and important literary prize in the Arab world. Following the nomination for the IPAF award, Bali was interviewed by the official Syrian TV website, with questions about her personal development as a writer, the importance of contemporary novel writing and the Arab readership. Asked about her view of the present-state destruction of Aleppo, she said:

Although the crimes committed against this city are too great to be forgotten or treated by a literary work, I wanted to present the splendid Aleppo in Suleima's Ring with all its strife, wounds and pride, to invite those who watched it bombed, destroyed and humiliated to see its original character [...] In my novels, I always tend to associate my tragedy or the tragedy of my people with other tragedies in the world.

— Rima Bali, author of Suleima's Ring

=== Reception in Spanish media ===
In November 2023, the Spanish translation of her second novel El Girasol Azul was featured by the Fundación Euroárabe de Altos Estudios (Euro-Arab Foundation for Higher Studies), an organization for cultural exchange between Arab and European States in Granada, Spain. A review in the March 2024 issue of El Imparcial news media called Bali "one of the most evocative and attractive figures in Arabic literature today". Also, it praised the quality of the translation and described the novel as "A story of a brave woman, who fights against adversity and never gives up."

== See also ==
- Syrian literature
