= Omar Youssef Souleimane =

Syrian poet and journalist (born 1987)

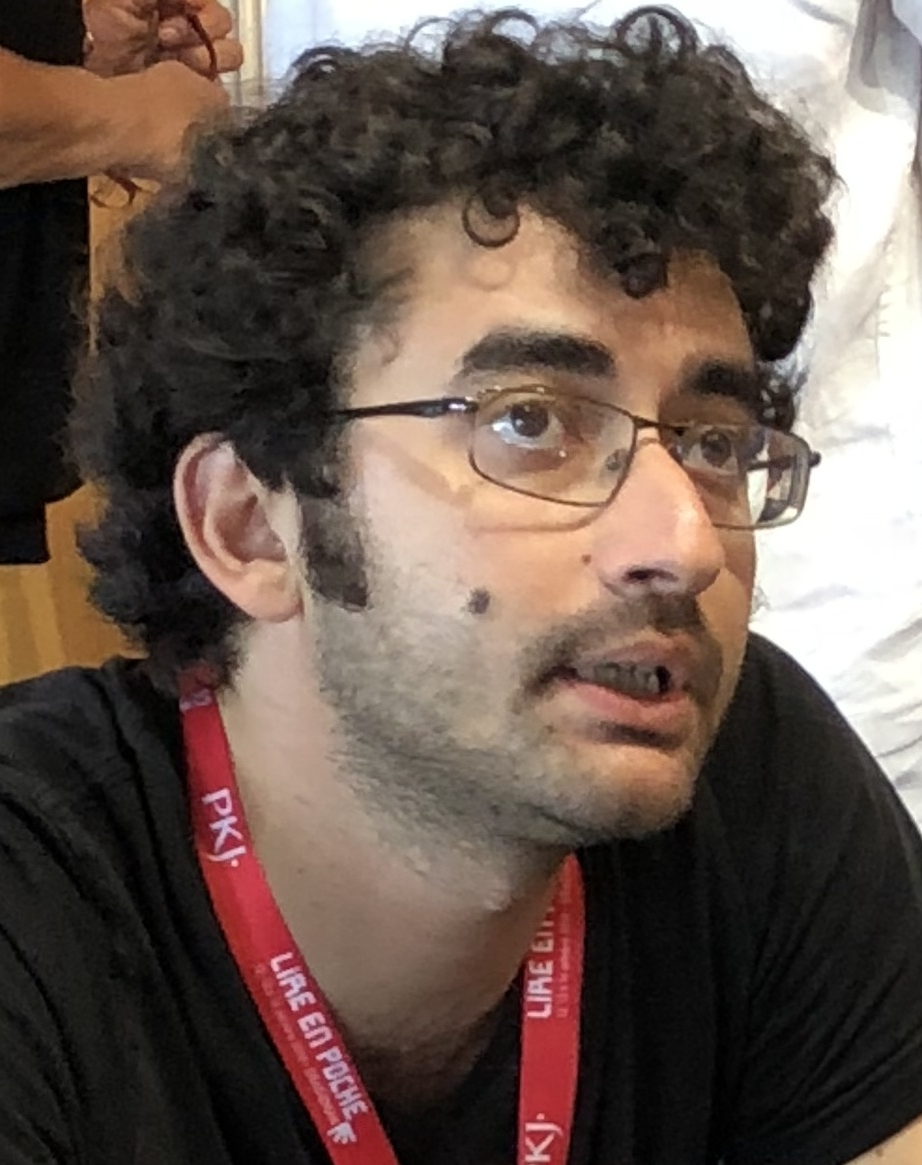
- Omar Youssef Souleimane in 2018
- Native name: عمر يوسف سليمان
- Born: 1987
- Occupation: poet and novelist
- Language: Arabic, French
- Citizenship: French, Syrian
- Period: 2006–present
- Genre: poetry, novels, essays
- Subject: exile literature
- Literary movement: contemporary Syrian literature
- Notable works: The Last Syrian, novel
- Notable awards: Prize Souad Al-Sabah, Prize Amélie-Murat, Prix du poète résistant

Omar Youssef Souleimane, (Arabic: عمر يوسف سليمان; born 1987 in Al-Qutayfah near Damascus, Syria), is a French-Syrian journalist, poet and literary writer. In 2011, he fled Syria for his political views and has lived in exile in France since 2012. Souleiman has published an autobiography, novels and several poetry collections, first in Arabic and later also in French. His works have been awarded Arab and French literary prizes and are part of Syrian literature in the context of war and imprisonment.

== Life and career ==
As a teenager, Souleimane grew up with his religiously conservative Syrian parents in Saudi Arabia. Later, he studied Arabic literature at Al-Baath University in Homs and worked as a journalist in Syria from 2006 to 2010. During the Arab Spring, he took part in demonstrations against extra-judicial arrests and killings in Syria, which are covered by the state of emergency and in force since 1963.

After the outbreak of the civil war in Syria in 2011, Souleiman was wanted by the secret services and fled to Jordan. In 2012, he emigrated to France where he was granted asylum. There, he learned French, a language in which he later published several of his works. From December 2016 to June 2022, Souleiman was director of a programme titled La nouvelle poésie syrienne à l’heure de la guerre et des nouveaux moyens de communication (New Syrian poetry at a time of war and new means of communication) at the Collège international de philosophie.

In January 2018, Souleiman published Le Petit Terroriste (The small terrorist), an autobiographical story in which he defends the freedom to criticize the religion in which he was raised, Islam. In 2022, he became a French citizen, and the following year, he published his essay Être français (Being French).

His 2020 novel Le dernier Syrien, written in French, has been translated into Italian, German and English as The Last Syrian. It tells the story of young Syrians during the 2011 revolution, including their struggles with society not accepting same-sex relationships and sexuality. According to literary magazine ArabLit, it is a piece of subversive writing against stereotypes of a "tame" Syrian kind of fiction. In his review for the German online platform Qantara, novelist Volker Kaminski called it "a dark, yet exciting novel that refuses to relinquish the desperate hope that the current generation will be "a bridge" that the next generation can cross "to get to (…) democracy."

Souleiman has also written for French newspapers, including L'Express, Le Figaro and Le Point.

== Works ==
=== Novels and essays ===
- Être français, essay, Flammarion, 2023,
- Une chambre en exil, novel, Flammarion, 2022,
- Le Dernier Syrien, novel, Flammarion, 2020, also published in Italian, German and English, 2024
- Le Petit Terroriste, autobiography, Flammarion, 2018

=== Poetry ===
- Damas, je te salue, 2024
- Loin de Damas, translated from Arabic, 2016,
- L’Enfant oublié, translated from Arabic, 2016
- La Mort ne séduit pas les ivrognes, bilingual French/Arabic, 2014
- Il ne faut pas qu'ils meurent, Beirut, 2013
- Je ferme les yeux et j'y vais, 2010
- Chansons des saisons, Syria, 2006

=== Awards ===
- Souad Al-Sabah Prize 2010, Kuwait, for Je ferme les yeux et j'y vais
- Amélie-Murat Prize 2016, France, for La Mort ne séduit pas les ivrognes
- Prix du poète résistant, France, 2017 for Loin de Damas
