= Mustafa Khalifa =

Syrian novelist, political writer and former prisoner of conscience

Mustafa Khalifa, also spelled Moustafa Khalifa (Arabic: مصطفى خليفة; born 1948 in Jarabulus, Syria) is a Syrian novelist, political writer and former prisoner of conscience. He became first known for his autobiographical novel The Shell: Memoirs of a Hidden Observer that has been translated into several languages.

== Early life ==
Khalifa spent his childhood in the northern Syrian metropolis Aleppo, where he began to participate in political activities as a teenager. Because of this, he was imprisoned twice. Upon his release, Khalifa studied art and film direction in France, and was arrested at Damascus airport when he returned from Paris. From 1982-1994, Khalifa was held without trial at various state security prisons, including the infamous Tadmur Prison. According to the National Academy of Sciences of the United States, he was imprisoned for suspected involvement in the prohibited Party for Communist Action. Amnesty International considered Khalifa to be a prisoner of conscience.

== Works ==
=== Novels ===
Khalifa's autobiographical novel The Shell: Memoirs of a Hidden Observer (Al-Qawqaʿa: Yawmiyyāt Mutalaṣṣiṣ) was in 2008 his first published work of fiction. Joseph Sassoon described the book as one of the "most powerful" memoirs of Arabic prison literature. According to Salwa Ismail, Khalifa considers his prison novel to be "a document and a testimony." Arab publishers were initially wary of printing the novel, in which the main character, like the author, is imprisoned for thirteen years during Hafez al-Assad’s regime. However, the Franco-Syrian editor Farouk Mardam-Bey released the book with the French publisher Actes Sud, translated into French by Stéphanie Dujols, entitled La Coquille: Prisonnier politique en Syrie. A year later the Arabic publisher Dar al-Adab in Beirut published the book in its original Arabic version. The book was also translated into English by Paul Starkey and published by Interlink Books. It has also been translated into several other languages, including Italian, Spanish and German.

In 2017, Khalifa published his second novel Raqsat al-Qubur (The Grave Dance).

=== Other publications ===
==== What if Bashar Assad wins? ====
In 2012 the non-governmental organization Souria Houria published a paper by Khalifa translated as What if Bashar Assad wins? where the author considers a "hypothetical victory" of the Syrian regime. Khalifa considers what the implications would be on a domestic, as well as on a regional and international level, if the Syrian regime should win against the people.

==== The impossible partition of Syria ====
In 2013 the Arab Reform Initiative published Khalifa's research paper titled The impossible partition of Syria. Gary C. Gambill described Khalifa's study as "an excellent discussion of demographic barriers to partition". In the study, Khalifa argues that the partition of Syria along sectarian boundaries would lead to disaster, because it would fail to restore peace and would also be a danger for the stability of neighboring countries. Khalifa mapped the ethnic and sectarian composition of Syrian society, and also discussed Syria's economy, trying to determine when and how fragmentation might occur. He argued that these factors had led to the failure of partition in 1922, which would have given the Alawites control over a smaller state, therefore, the partition of Syria remained an "impossible" prospect.

== Personal life ==
Khalifa is married to the activist Sahar al-Bunni, the sister of the political activists Akram al-Bunni and Anwar al-Bunni. Although he was banned from travelling outside Syria, in 2006 Khalifa managed to emigrate first to the United Arab Emirates, and moved to France in 2011, where he has been living since.

== Awards ==
- Ibn Rushd Prize for Freedom of Thought, Germany, in 2015

== See also ==
- Syrian literature
