= Jan Pêt Khorto =

Syrian-Kurdish writer, poet and journalist (born 1986)

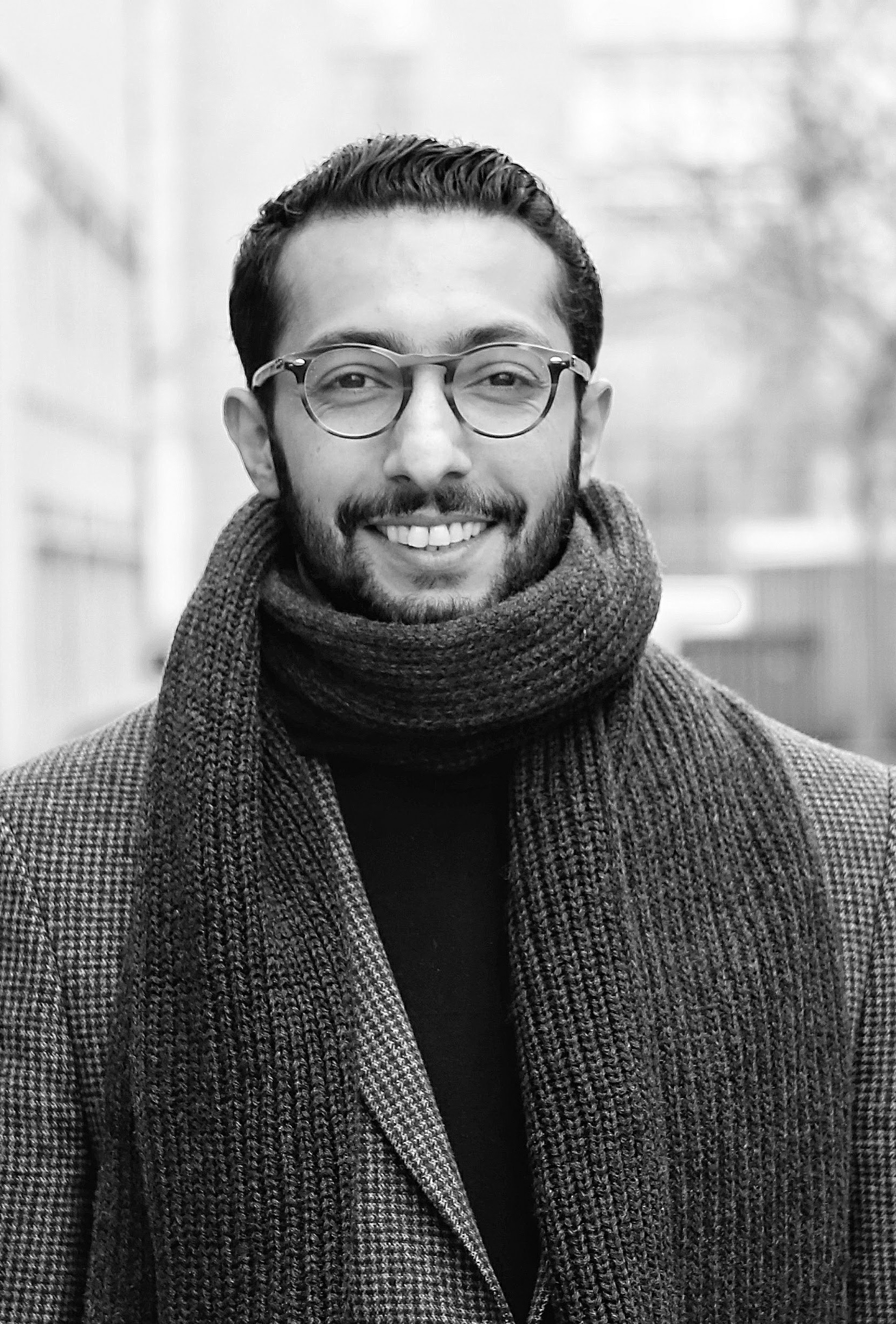
- Born: Aleppo
- Education: Political Science, Journalism
- Occupations: Poet, Writer, Journalist
- Writing career
- Subject: Poetry
- Literary movement: Syrian exile literature

Jan Pêt Khorto (born 1986) is a Syrian Kurdish poet, writer, academic and public speaker. His poetry, written in Arabic, English and Danish, is known for its political orientation and has been characterized as exile literature from Syria. His style is influenced by the works of Kahlil Gibran, Jorge Luis Borges, and Franz Kafka.

== Biography ==
Born in Aleppo, Khorto is of a Kurdish descent. He is from Afrin; a Kurdish city in north-western Syria. He received his formal education in Aleppo, then moved to Damascus to study journalism at Damascus University in 2006. While at university, Jan initiated an underground newspaper together with several Kurdish and Arab journalists and artists. Their activities were spotted by the Syrian intelligence services, and some of the members were arrested. In 2008, Khorto was arrested as well due to his literary and political activism. He was released after several months in various Mukhabarat centres, including the directorates for Political, Military, General and Air Force Intelligence. He was officially expelled from Damascus University in 2008 for his literary and political activities.

He currently lives in Copenhagen, Denmark, since 2009 as an exiled writer. He started a newspaper in 2010 titled ID-Zone that focused on the living conditions and stories of asylum seekers in Denmark. The newspaper lasted 11 months. He was a co-founder of the Syrian Cultural Institute in Denmark in 2015, and occupied the position of Vice-President at the board from 2016 to 2017. In 2016, he received a BSc in International Business and Politics from Copenhagen Business School and in 2018 a MSc in Political Science from Aarhus University.

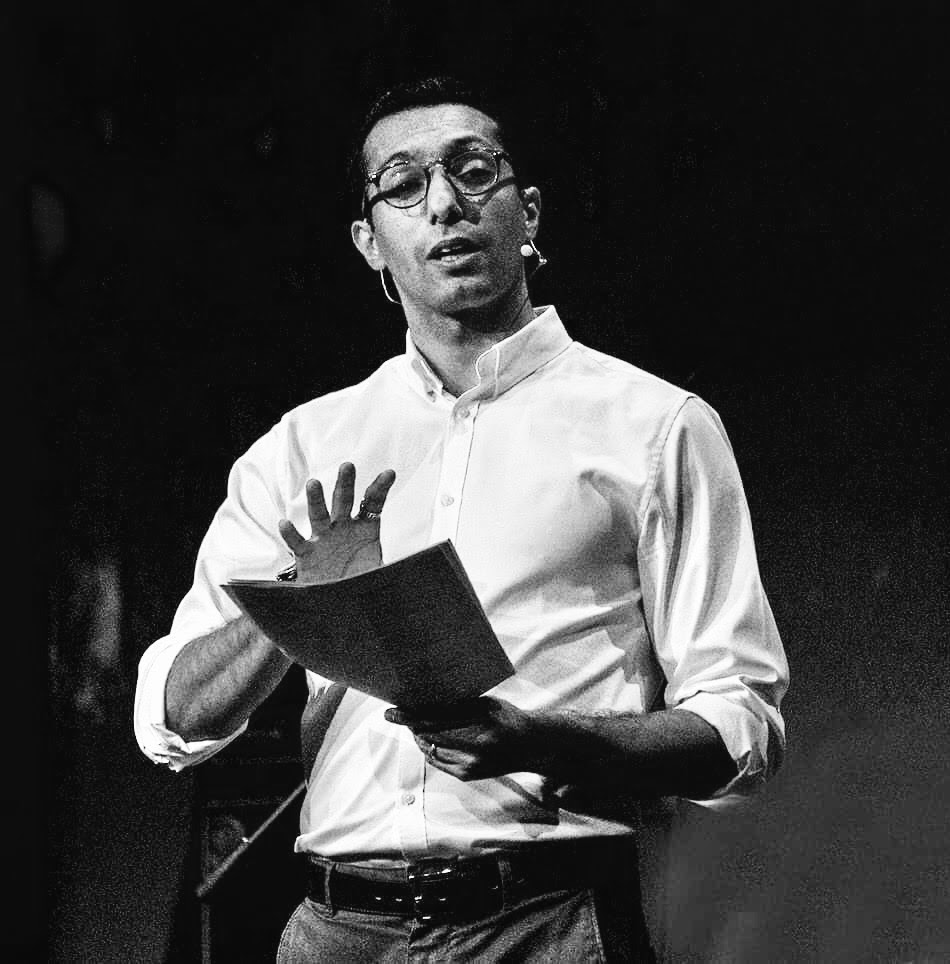
Jan Pêt Khorto, Denmark, 2017

== Works ==
Khorto began writing poetry in Arabic, the official language of Syria, at a very young age. He published his first poetry collection, Never Ending Words, at the age of 17. The collection was not approved by the Syrian Ministry of Culture, and therefore was banned in the country. The same happened with his second collection, The Puzzles, which he published two years later.

Two of his poetry collections have been translated and published in Denmark; Helveds Fristelser (2011) and Edens Vugge: Hviskende Skæbner fra Syrien (2016). His 2017 poetry collection, Hell's Temptations: When Homelands are Carried in Bags was published by the Egyptian Ministry of Culture in 2017 in Arabic.

== List of published works ==
- Never Ending Words (2005, Aleppo), in Arabic.
- The Puzzles (2007, Aleppo), in Arabic.
- Helveds Fistelser (2011, Copenhagen), in Danish.
- Edens Vugge: Hviskende Skæbner fra Syrien (2016, Copenhagen), in Danish.
- Hell's Temptations: When Homelands are Carried in Bags (2017, Cairo), in Arabic.

== See also ==
- Syrian literature - 21st-century literature in the context of imprisonment, war and exile
