= Hala Mohammad =

Syrian poet and filmmaker, born 1959

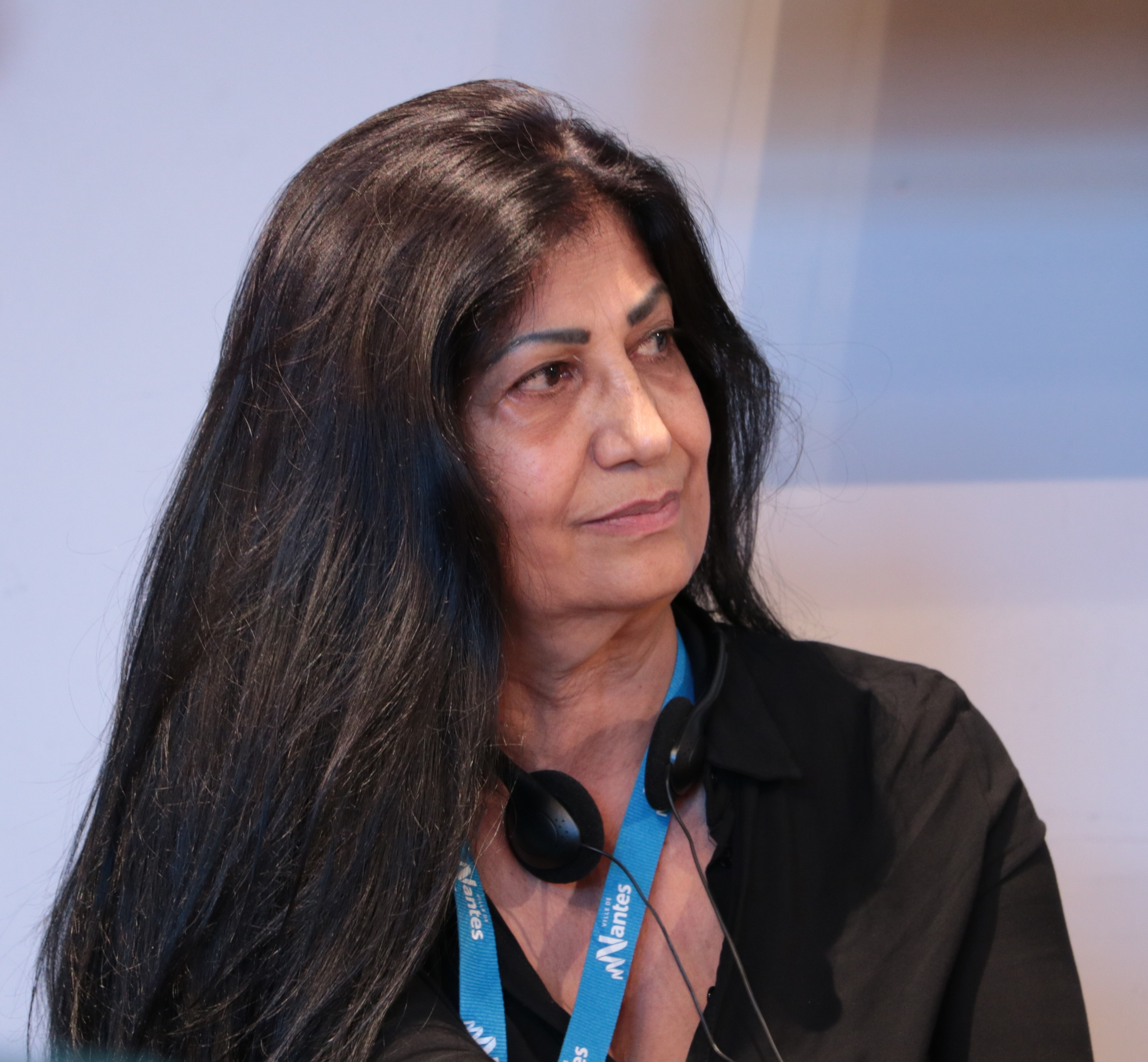
- Hala Mohammad at Festival Atlantide, Nantes 2022
- Born: 1959 (age 66–67); Latakia, Syria
- Occupations: Poet; documentary filmmaker
- Writing career
- Genre: Poetry
- Notable work: A Journey into Memory (documentary film)
- Literary movement: contemporary Syrian literature

Hala Mohammad (Arabic: هالة محمد; born 1959) is a Syrian poet and former filmmaker, living in exile in France since 2011. She is mainly known in the Arab world and beyond for her documentary films and poetry as an intellectual opposing the Syrian government. Her literary work is part of Syrian exile literature.

== Biography ==
Mohammad was born in Latakia, a major city on the northern coast of Syria. After studying cinema at the Université Paris VIII Vincennes-Saint-Denis in France, she started working in the Syrian film industry. She directed several short films and documentaries about Syrian prisons. Further, she worked as assistant director with Abdellatif Abdelhamid and costume designer for various feature films.

According to the book Readings in Syrian Prison Literature by Syrian writer R. Shareah Taleghani, her 2006 film Rihla ila al-Dhakira (A Journey into Memory) was the earliest full-length documentary about Tadmor Prison. It shows former inmates of this prison Yassin al-Haj Saleh, Ghassan al-Jaba'i and Faraj Bayrakdar talking about their experience and walking among the historic ruins of Palmyra. The film was broadcast in 2010 on Al Jazeera English TV, and Mohammad was persecuted by the Syrian secret police.

In 1994, Mohammad started publishing her poems. Well known in the Arab world, she is a regular contributor to the cultural pages of various Arabic newspapers. Further, she has participated in a number of international literary festivals and literary encounters in France and Germany. Her six collections of Arabic poems have been published in Lebanon and France, with three of them in Arabic and French bilingual editions. Several of her works have been translated into other languages, including English, French, German, Swedish and Turkish. Belonging to the politically outspoken generation of contemporary Arab poets, she is known for her public appearance as writer and intellectual.

Leaving Syria at the outbreak of the Syrian civil war in 2011, she found refuge in France. Her 2013 collection Qalat al-farasha (The butterfly has spoken) is dedicated to the Syrian revolution.

In 2012, the Scottish Documentary Institute produced a documentary film for Al Jazeera English, titled Artscape: Poets of Protest - Hala Mohammad: Waiting for Spring. In this portrait of Mohammad living in Paris, she talks about her perspective on the role of poetry in the political developments in the Middle East, and about her poem The Syrian people will not be humiliated, based on a popular slogan of the Syrian revolution.

== Selected works ==
=== Poetry collections ===
- Qalat al-farasha (The butterfly has spoken), Dar el-Rayyes, 2013.
- Ce peu de vie (in Arabic and French). Translated by Antoine Jockey. Neuilly-sur-Seine: Al Manar. 2016. ISBN 978-2-36426-073-3.
- Prête-moi une fenêtre, translated by Antoine Jockey, Éditions Bruno Doucey, 2018, ISBN 978-2-36229-175-3
- Les hirondelles se sont envolées avant nous, bilingual edition, French translation by Antoine Jockey, Éditions Bruno Doucey, 2021, ISBN 978-2-36229-376-4.

=== Filmography ===
==== All titles translated from Arabic ====
- This is the Al Qaymariya neighbourhood (2010)
- How much do we have? (2009)
- The Elogy of Hatred (2009)
- For a Piece of Cake (2007)
- A Journey into Memory (2006)
- When Qassiun is tired (2006)
- Once upon a Time (1992)
