= Ghalia Qabbani =

Syrian writer

Ghalia Qabbani is a Syrian writer and journalist. She grew up in Kuwait, but was forced to leave after the Iraqi invasion in 1990.

She studied law at a university and graduated in 1979. She has worked as a journalist ever since, including stints at al-Watan (Kuwait) and al-Hayat (London). She moved to the United Kingdom in 1994.

Her books include several collections of short stories and novels. Her debut novel The Mirror of Summer appeared in 1998, followed by her second novel Secrets and Lies.

She served on the judging panel of the inaugural Arabic Booker Prize.

Currently, she lives in London.
