= Rasha Omran =

Syrian poet (born 1964)

- Born: 28 May 1964 (age 62); Tartus, Syria
- Education: Damascus University
- Occupations: Poet, writer
- Known for: Arabic poetry

Rasha Omran (Arabic: رشا عمران) is a Syrian poet, living in exile in Cairo since 2012. She is known as the author of seven poetry collections and an anthology of Syrian poetry in Arabic. Some of her poems have been published in English, Catalan, French, German and Italian.

Through her public commentaries about Arab culture and intellectual life, Omran became known as a critic of the former regime under Bashar al-Assad and the failure of Arab intellectuals to criticise its crimes.

== Biography ==
Rasha Omran was born in 1964 in Tartus, Syria, into a family of Alawite artists. She is the daughter of Syrian poet Mohammad Omran, a poet, activist, and journalist, and their home was a cultural gathering place for intellectuals and artists. As a child, she read freely in her family library and she later attended Damascus University to study Arabic literature. She founded the Al-Sindiyan Festival of Literature and Culture in her hometown in the late 1990s, which she directed for 16 years, and published her first poems after the death of her father. She has published seven collections of poetry and is the editor of an anthology of contemporary Syrian poetry.

Since the beginning of the Syrian revolution, she publicly expressed her support for the uprising, saying "This is a dictatorial regime, [....] How can I support a government that kills its citizens?" She has marched in protests, written about her dissent, and spoken out against Bashar al-Assad, calling him "not a dictator, just a gangster boss." Omran also coined the phrase, "the international silence on Syria is deafening." Threatened along with her family by the Syrian regime, she went into exile in Cairo in 2012. In September 2012, Omran and four other Syrian women launched a hunger strike outside the Arab League's headquarters in Cairo's Tahrir Square, demanding that the Arab League provide more support for the revolutionaries and pressure Assad to halt the human rights abuses in Syria.

Omran has lived in Cairo since 2012 where she continues to write and publish her poetry, as well as three weekly articles for online Arab media, where she comments on political and cultural news.

== Works ==
- زوجة سرية للغياب (A secret Wife of Absence). Poems. Al Mutawassit, Milan 2020
- التي سكنت البيت قبلي (She who dwelt in the House before me). Poems. Al Mutawassit, Milan 2016
- بانوراما الموت والوحشة (Panorama of Death and Solitude). Poems. Dar Non 2014
- معطف أحمر فارغ (A red and empty Coat). Poems. Syrian Ministry of Culture 2009
- ظلك الممتد في أقصى حنيني (Your Shadow, cast in my utter Yearning). Poems. Al Tanweer 2003
- كأن منفاي جسدي (As though my Exile was my Body). Poems. Dar Arwad 1999
- وجع له شكل الحياة (Pain in the Form of Life). Poems. Dar Arwad 1997
- أنطولوجيا الشعر السوري (Anthology of Syrian Poetry 1980–2008), Damascus 2008

== Translations ==
- Three Poems from A Secret Wife of Absence
- Poems from A Secret Wife of Absence
- Defy the Silence
- If I Were a Cat (in English and French)
- When longing tormented me

== Reception ==
A 2016 interview in the New York Review mentioned Omran's public commentaries about Arab culture and intellectual life, where she criticized the former regime under Bashar al-Assad and the failure of Arab intellectuals to protest against its crimes.

The German website for international poetry Lyrikline published two of Omran's poems, including “كأنني مشعوذة العزلة” (As if I were a juggler of solitude) and “البرية التي لا يذهب اليها أحد” (The desert where no one goes), both in the original Arabic script and as audio recordings, as well as in German translation.

In 2022, the Festival d'Avignon in France produced Omran's stage presentation of her poem "التي سكنت البيت قبلي" translated into French as "Celle qui habitait la maison avant moi". It was performed by singer Isabelle Duthoit, Syrian actress Nanda Mohammad and Rasha Omran herself. The poem is about a woman who lives in a big city apartment where the ghost of its former tenant is always present. It speaks of solitude and growing old, as well as about wounded femininity, both by the past and the "dead ends of the present." It represents the word as the main sensation of being alive. In English, a quote from the poem reads like this:

If I had lived in the house before her/I would have done the same/I would have removed the oeil-de-boeuf from the front door/And left an open hole instead/So that everyone’s eye could/Spy/On my solitude.

— Rasha Omran, from her poem "التي سكنت البيت قبلي" (English: She who lived in the house before me)

== See also ==
- Women in Arabic literature - 20th to 21st century
- Modern Arabic literature - Poetry
- Syrian literature - 20th-century poetry
