= Salim Barakat =

Syrian Kurdish writer, born 1951

Salim Barakat سليم بركات / Selîm Berekat
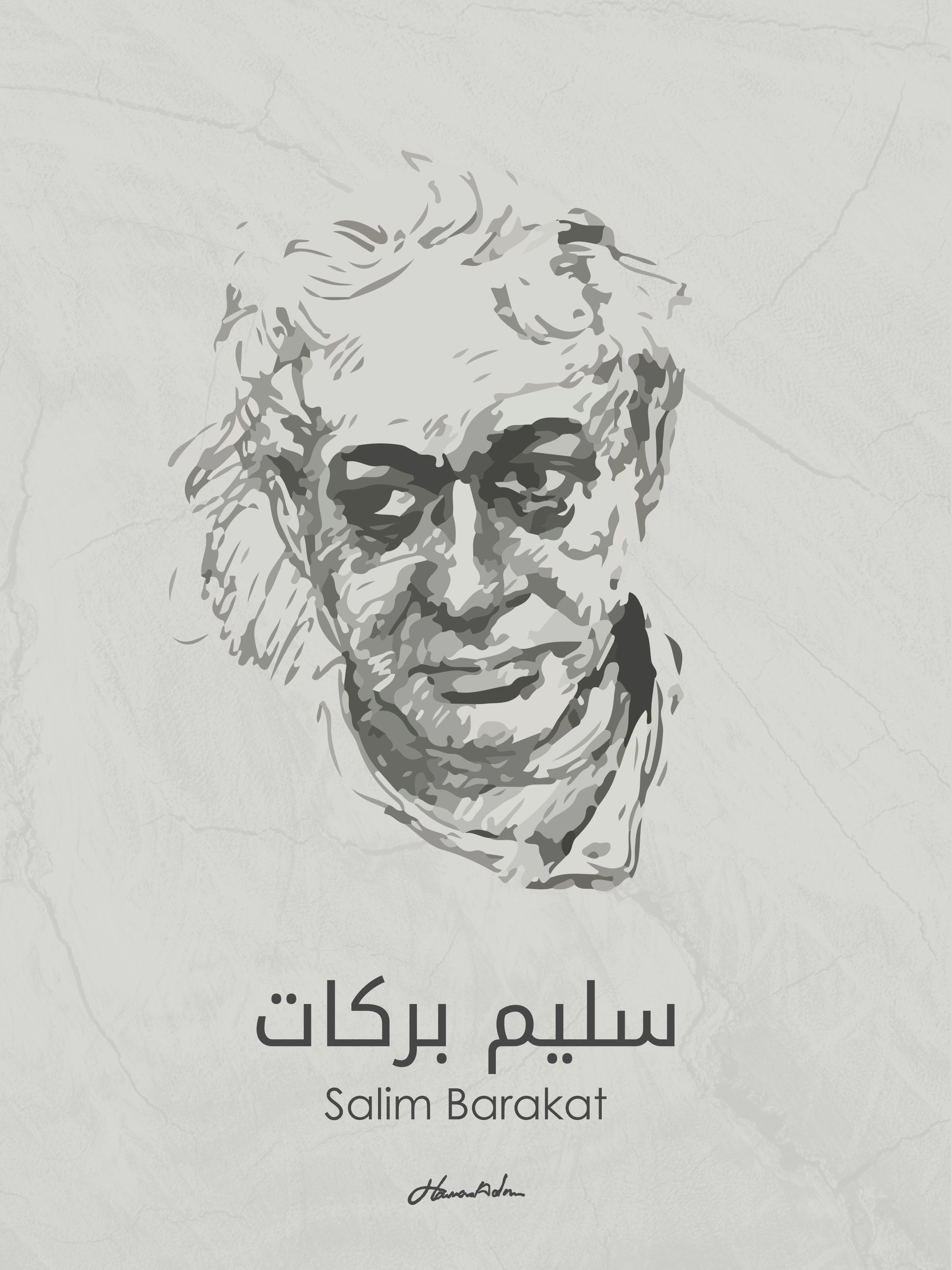
- Born: 1 September 1951 (age 75); Qamishli, Syria
- Occupations: novelist, poet
- Writing career
- Language: Arabic
- Years active: 1973–present
- Genres: Magical realism, children's literature
- Notable works: Jurists of Darkness, Come, take a Gentle Stab: Selected Poems

Salim Barakat (Arabic: سليم بركات, Kurdish: Selîm Berekat; born 1 September 1951 in Qamishli) is a Kurdish-Syrian novelist and poet. He is considered one of the innovative poets and novelists writing in Arabic. Since the 1970s, he has published numerous novels, poetry collections, biographies and children's books. Several of his works have been translated into Kurdish, English, French, German, Swedish and other languages.

== Life and career ==
He wrote about Kurdish culture, as well as Arab, Assyrian, Armenian, Circassian and Yazidi culture. His earliest major prose work, Al-Jundub al-Hadidi (The Iron Grasshopper), is an autobiography of his childhood in Qamishli.

Stefan G. Meyer said "Barakat's style is probably the closest by any Arab writer's to that of Latin American magical realism" and has called Barakat "perhaps the master prose stylist writing in Arabic today".

In the 2006 anthology Literature from the "Axis of Evil", an excerpt from his novel Jurists of Darkness (1985) in English was published by Words Without Borders.

According to online magazine Literary hub, Barakat had been one of the official candidates for the 2022 Nobel Prize for Literature.

== Published works ==
=== in English ===
- An excerpt from his novel Jurists of Darkness. In: Literature from the Axis of Evil : Writing from Iran, Iraq, North Korea and Other Enemy Nations: A Words Without Borders Anthology. 2006. New York: New Press.
- Salīm Barakāt, Huda J. Fakhreddine and Jayson Iwen. 2021. Come, Take a Gentle Stab: Selected Poems. London: Seagull Books, ISBN 9781803091952.
- Salīm Barakāt and Huda J. Fakhreddine. 2024. The Universe, All at Once: Selected Poems. London: Seagull Books, ISBN 9781803094038.

=== Novels ===
- (1985) The Sages of Darkness (Arabic: فقهاء الظلام)
- (1987) Geometric Spirits (Arabic: أرواح هندسية)
- (1990) The Feathers (Arabic: الريش)
- (1993) The Camps of Infinity (Arabic: معسكرات الأبد)
- (1994) The Astrologers on the Tuesday of Death: Crossing of the Flamingo (Arabic: الفلكيون في ثلثاء الموت: عبور البشروش)
- (1996) The Astrologers on the Tuesday of Death: Cosmos (Arabic: الفلكيون في ثلثاء الموت: الكون)
- (1997) The Astrologers on the Tuesday of Death: The Liver of Milaeus (Arabic: الفلكيون في ثلثاء الموت: كبد ميلاؤس)
- (1999) Debris of the Second Eternity (Arabic: أنقاض الأزل الثاني)
- (2001) Seals and Nebula (Arabic: الأختام والسديم)
- (2003) Delshad (Arabic: دلشاد)
- (2004) The Caves of Haydrahodahose (Arabic: كهوف هايدراهوداهوس)
- (2005) Thadrimis (Arabic: ثادريميس)
- (2006) Novice Dead (Arabic: موتى مبتدئون)
- (2007) The Sand Ladders (Arabic: السلالم الرملية)
- (2008) The Anguish of Indescribable Perplexing Intimacy in the Voice of Sarmak (Arabic: لوعة الأليف اللا موصوف المحير في صوت سارماك)
- (2010) The Agitation of Geese (Arabic: هياج الإوزّ)
- (2010) Crushed Hoofs in Haydrahodahose (Arabic: حوافر مهشمة في هايدراهوداهوس)
- (2011) Vacant Sky Over Jerusalem (Arabic: السماء شاغرة فوق أورشليم)
- (2012) Vacant Sky Over Jerusalem, Part II (Arabic: السماء شاغرة فوق أورشليم 2)
- (2013) The Mermaid and her Daughters (Arabic: حورية الماء وبناتها)
- (2014) Prisoners of Mount Ayayanu East (Arabic: سجناء جبل أيايانو الشرقي)
- (2016) Regions of the Djinn (Arabic: أقاليم الجنّ)
- (2016) The Captives of Sinjar (Arabic: سبايا سنجار)
- (2017) The Roaring of Shadows in Zenobia's Gardens (Arabic: زئير الظلال في حدائق زنوبيا)
- (2018) A Biography of Existence and a Brief History of Resurrection (Arabic: سيرة الوجود وموجز تاريخ القيامة)
- (2019) What about the Jewish lady Rachel? (Arabic: ماذا عن السيدة اليهودية راحيل؟)
- (2020) Encyclopedia of Perfection without Distortion: The Genesis of Minerals (Arabic: موسوعة الكمال بلا تحريف: نشوء المعادن)
- (2021) Medusa does not comb her hair (Arabic: ميدوسا لا تسرّح شعرها)
- (2021) The Snow is more treacherous in the Spruce Forests (Arabic: الثلوج أكثر خداعًا في غابات التنّوب)
- (2022) Those Little Girls and their Paper Bags (Arabic: هؤلاء الصغيرات وأكياسهنّ الورقية)
- (2023) The Eleven Delights of Suicide and The Measure of Deceits in the Spiritual States of Jalaluddin Rumi (Arabic: مباهج الانتحار الإحدى عشرة، وقياس المراوغات في أحوال جلال الدين الرومي)
- (2024) Heads and Spices (Arabic: رؤوس وتوابل)
- (2025) Hiring Ghosts (Arabic: استئجار الأشباح)
- (2026) Ithaka (Arabic: إيثاكا)

=== Poetry ===
- (1973) Each Newcomer Shall Hail Me, So Shall Each Outgoer (Arabic: كل داخل سيهتف لأجلي، وكل خارج أيضاً)
- (1975) Thus Do I Disperse Moussissana (Arabic: هكذا أبعثر موسيسانا)
- (1977) For the Dust, for Shamdin, for Cycles of Prey and Cycles of Kingdoms (Arabic: للغبار، لشمدين، لأدوار الفريسة وأدوار الممالك)
- (1979) The Throngs (Arabic: الجمهرات)
- (1981) The Cranes (Arabic: الكراكي)
- (1987) By the Very Traps, by the Very Foxes Leading the Wind (Arabic: بالشّباك ذاتها، بالثعالب التي تقود الريح)
- (1991) The Falconer (Arabic: البازيار)
- (1996) Recklessness of the Ruby (Arabic: طيش الياقوت)
- (1997) Confrontations, Covenants, Threshing Floors, Adversities, etc. (Arabic: المجابهات، المواثيق الأجران، التصاريف، وغيرها)
- (2000) Hefts (Arabic: المثاقيل)
- (2005) Lexicon (Arabic: المعجم)
- (2008) The People of Three O'clock at Dawn on the Third Thursday (Arabic: شعب الثالثة فجرا من الخميس الثالث)
- (2009) Translating Basalt (Arabic: ترجمة البازلت)
- (2011) The Flood (Arabic: السيل)
- (2012) The Haughtiness of Homogeneity (Arabic: عجرفة المتجانس)
- (2012) Gods (Arabic: آلهة)
- (2014) The North of Hearts or their West (Arabic: شمال القلوب أو غربها)
- (2015) Syria (Arabic: سوريا)
- (2016) The Great Poem of Love (Arabic: الغزليّة الكبرى)
- (2016) All the doors (Arabic: الأبواب كلّها)
- (2018) Alerting the Animal to its Ancestry (Arabic: تنبيه الحيوان إلى أنسابه)
- (2019) The Spoils of the Athletes and the Teachings they adhere to (Arabic: مغانم الرياضيّين والتعاليم كما التزموها)
- (2021) The Five Hundred Shrapnels (Arabic: الشظايا الخمسمائة)
- (2022) Spiritual Denunciation (Arabic: تنديد روحاني)
- (2023) A Battle in the Water Time Zone (Arabic: معركة في توقيت الماء)
- (2025) Provoking Thunder (Arabic: التحرّش بالرعد)

=== Autobiographies ===
- (1976) Church of the Warrior (Arabic: كنيسة المحارب)
- (1980) The Iron Grasshopper (Arabic: الجندب الحديدي)
- (1982) Play High the Trumpet, Play It the Highest (Arabic: هاته عالياً، هات النّفير على آخره)

=== Collections ===
- (1992) Diwan (Arabic: الديوان)
- (1999) Pharmacopoeia (Arabic: الأقراباذين) (Collected essays)
- (2007) Poetical Works (Arabic: الأعمال الشعرية) (Collected poems 1973–2005)
- (2010) Expediting the Loans of Prose (Arabic: التعجیل فی قروض النثر) (Essays and articles 1983–2008)
- (2017) Poetical Works 2 (Arabic: الأعمال الشعرية 2) (Collected poems 2008–2016)
- (2020) Agony as Mathematics, Yearning as Geometry (Arabic: لوعة كالرياضيات وحنين كالهندسة) (Interviews and essays)

=== Short Prose ===
- (2024) Inciting Meanings Against their Origins and Escalating Calls for Prose Rights (Arabic: تأليب المعاني على أصولها، وتصعيد المطالب بحقوق النثر)
- (2026) Bewilderment before the Blast, followed by the Stillness of the Lake (Arabic: ذهول قبل النسف، يليه هدوء البحيرة)

=== Children's books ===
- (1975) Narjis (Arabic: نرجس)
- (1980) Who Guards the Earth? (Arabic: من يحرس الأرض)
- (1980) Sleep (Arabic: النوم)

== See also ==
- Syrian literature
