= Rosa Yaseen Hasan =

Syrian novelist and writer (born 1975)

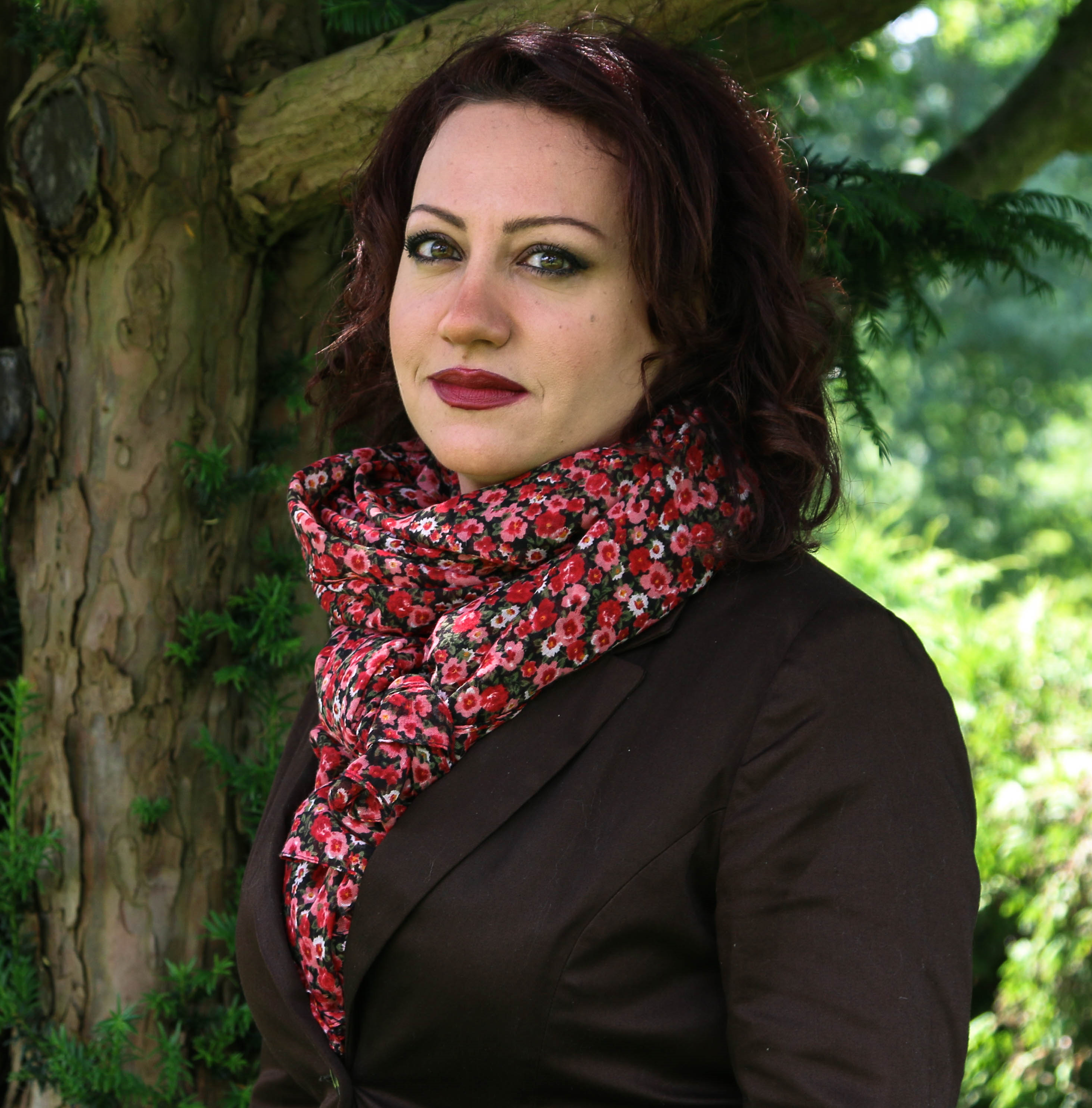
Rosa Yaseen Hasan

Rosa Yaseen Hassan (Arabic: روزا ياسين حسن) is a Syrian novelist and writer. She was born in Damascus in 1974 and studied architecture at university. Upon graduation in 1998, she worked as a journalist, writing for various Syrian and Arabic periodicals. Her first book was published in 2000, and was a collection of short stories titled A Sky Tainted with Light.

Hassan has also written a number of novels, including Ebony (2004), which won the Hanna Mina Prize, and Hurras al-Hawa (Guardians of the Air, 2009), which was longlisted for the Arabic Booker Prize.

In 2009, Hassan was chosen as one of the Beirut39—a group of 39 Arab writers under the age of 40 chosen through a contest organised by Banipal magazine and the Hay Festival.
