= Maram al-Masri =

Syrian writer, living in Paris (born 1962)

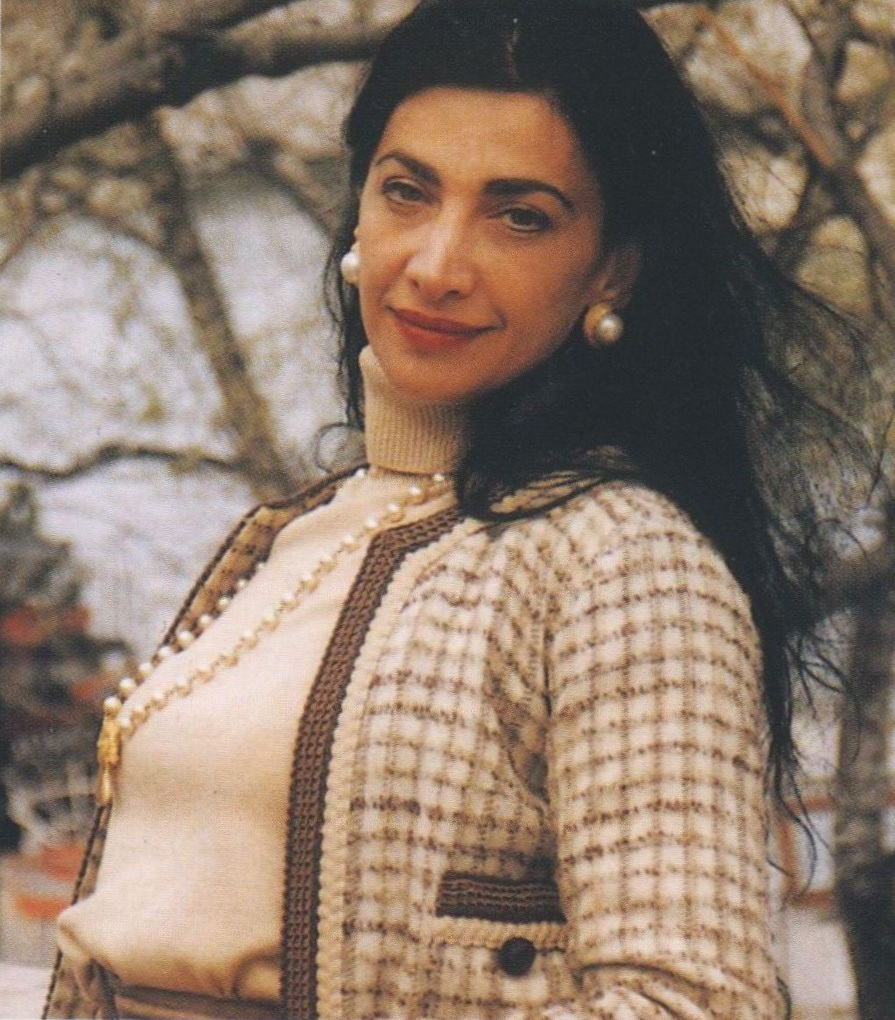
- Born: August 2, 1962 (age 63); Latakia, Syria
- Occupation: writer
- Known for: poetry

Maram al-Masri (born 2 August 1962) is a Syrian writer, living in Paris. She has been considered "one of the most renowned and captivating feminine voices of her generation" in Arabic.

== Biography ==
Born in the coastal city of Latakia to a well-known Sunni Muslim family, al-Masri studied English Literature in Damascus, although she interrupted her studies when she fell in love with a man of Christian faith. The relationship failed because of the opposition of the man's family as interfaith marriage was forbidden by Syrian law. In 1982, al-Masri emigrated to France, where she married a Syrian, whom she later divorced. In her book Le rapt she related to her experience of having been unable to see her son for 13 years, because he was taken to Syria by his father after she remarried. She has another two children with her French husband, from whom she separated, too.

Al-Masri started writing poetry from a young age "to distinguish herself from the other girls and to attract attention", publishing in literary magazines in Damascus. Her first collection was published there in 1984 under the title I alerted you with a white dove, but her public breakthrough came in 1997 with the book A red cherry on a white-tiled floor, published by the Tunisian Ministry of Culture, as it was considered "too erotic" by Syrian publishers.

In 2002, the book was published in a Spanish translation with several reprints, and shortly afterwards, French and English translations appeared. Al-Masri started to publish regularly in the French market and took up writing poetry in French, too. In a 2017 interview, she said that she writes for French and not Arab readers, as she perceives a difference in language and thoughts between both groups, most of her work is still written in Standard Arabic.

Al-Masri has taken a stand against the Assad regime in Syria and considers that "every decent person is with the Revolution". Her 2014 poetry collection Elle va nue la liberté [Freedom, she comes naked] is based on social media images of the civil war. Although she defines herself as an Atheist, she justified the use of religious slogans in the Syrian uprising as a "last opium" which cannot be taken away from people brutally oppressed by a dictatorship.

== Reception ==
Her poetry has been described as "direct, unadorned writing, with its emphasis on the quotidian", where the "utilization of simple, almost child-like metaphors, contrasts sharply with the conventions of traditional Arabic love poetry". "That a woman write so unreservedly about sex" also "lends a fresh, unexpected quality" to her poetry. The Guardian described her as "a love poet whose verse spares no truth of love’s joys and mercilessness."

Apart from Spanish translations, some of her works have been translated into Italian, Catalan and Corsican, with some samples in German, and she has been invited at poetry gatherings in several European countries, including Ireland and Italy.

She has received several prizes, like the "Adonis Prize" of the Lebanese Cultural Forum, the "Premio Citta di Calopezzati" and the "Prix d'Automne 2007" of the Societé des gens de lettres.

== Selected works ==
- I alerted you with a white dove (Andhartuka bi hamāmaẗ beidāʼ) (1984)
- A red cherry on a white-tiled floor [Karzaẗ ḥamrāʼ ʿalá balāṭ abyad] (2003)
- I look at you [Anẓuru ilayk] (2007)
- Wallada's return [ʿAudaẗ Wallada] (2010)
- Freedom, she comes naked (Elle va nue la liberté (2014)
- The abduction [Le rapt] (2015)
