= Arab Writers Union =

Arab writers' organization

Arab Writers Union إتحاد الكتاب العرب
- Founded: 1969
- Location: Abu Dhabi (United Arab Emirates)
- Website: Official website

The Arab Writers Union (ar.: اتحاد الكتاب العرب) is an association of Arab writers, founded in 1969, in Damascus, Syria, at the initiative of a group of Arab writers including Syrian novelist Hanna Mina. In 2008, the union was moved from Damascus to Cairo and in 2015 to Abu Dhabi. Its current president is Muhammad Al-Hourani.

In 2010, the Union published a list of the "100 Best Arabic novels," although the list in fact contained 105 entries. It ranked Egyptian author Naguib Mahfouz's Cairo Trilogy as the best Arabic-language novel, followed by In Search of Walid Masoud by Syrian author Jabra Ibrahim Jabra in second place and Honor by Egyptian Sonallah Ibrahim in third.

== Controversies ==
On 27 January 1995, following Syrian pressure, it was announced in Damascus that the Arab Writers Union had expelled the Syrian poet Adunis, for his participation in a meeting in Spain in 1993 that was attended by Israeli foreign minister Shimon Peres. This prompted widespread criticism among Arab intellectuals, with Hazem Sagieh, an editor at London-based Arabic daily Al Hayat, describing the Arab Writers Union as "remnants of a Stalinist past."

In 2007, Iraqi-German writer Najem Wali criticized the Union for its lack of solidarity with imprisoned or persecuted Arab writers and for what he described as its long-standing cooperation with the former government of Iraqi leader Saddam Hussein.

In 2012, one year after the outbreak of the civil war in Syria, Syrian writers, some of them living in Syria and others in exile, founded the Syrian Writers Association (SWA). Based in London, the SWA described itself as a "democratic alternative" to the Arab Writers Union.
