= National Book Award for Translated Literature =

American literary prize

- Awarded for: Outstanding literary work in translation.
- Location: New York City
- Country: United States
- Presented by: National Book Foundation
- Eligibility: Works translated into English and published by a U.S. publisher. Author and translator need not be U.S. citizens.
- Rewards: $10,000 USD (winner) $1,000 USD (finalists)
- First award: 1967-1983, 2018
- Website: National Book Foundation

The National Book Award for Translated Literature, is one of five annual National Book Awards in the US, recognising outstanding literary works of translation into English and administered by the National Book Foundation. This award was previously bestowed from 1967 to 1983 but did not require the author to be living and was for works of fiction only. It was reintroduced in its current form in 2018 and is open to living translators and authors, for works of both fiction and non-fiction.

The award recognises one book published by a U.S. publisher located in the United States from December 1 of the previous year to November 30 in the award year. The original text need not have been published in the year of the award submission, only the translated work. For the Translated Literature award neither author nor translator are required to be U.S. citizens.

Entries for the National Book Awards are open from March until May. A longlist of ten books is announced in September with a shortlist of five following in October. The winner is announced at a ceremony in November. The prizes are split equally between the author and the translator.

== Awards ==
This list only covers the current version of the National Book Award for Translated Literature from its reintroduction in 2018. Winners from 1967 to 1983 are covered in the complete list of winners of the National Book Award.

=== 2018 ===
The prize was judged by Karen Maeda Allman, Sinan Antoon, Susan Bernofsky, and Álvaro Enrigue and chaired by Harold Augenbraum. The longlist was announced on September 12. The finalists were announced October 10. The winner was announced on November 14, 2018.

2018 National Book Award for Translated Literature honorees
Author	Title	Original language	Translator	Country of Publication	Publisher	Result
Yoko Tawada	The Emissary	Japanese	Margaret Mitsutani	Japan-Germany	New Directions Publishing	Winner
Négar Djavadi	Disoriental	French	Tina Kover	Iran-France	Europa Editions	Finalists
Domenico Starnone	Trick	Italian	Jhumpa Lahiri	Italy	Europa Editions	Finalists
Olga Tokarczuk	Flights	Polish	Jennifer Croft	Poland	Riverhead Books	Finalists
Hanne Ørstavik	Love	Norwegian	Martin Aitken	Norway	Archipelago Books	Finalists
Roque Larraquy	Comemadre	Spanish	Heather Cleary	Argentina	Coffee House Press	Longlist
Dunya Mikhail	The Beekeeper: Rescuing the Stolen Women of Iraq	Arabic	Max Weiss	Iraq-USA	New Directions Publishing	Longlist
Perumal Murugan	One Part Woman	Tamil	Aniruddhan Vasudevan	India	Black Cat	Longlist
Tatyana Tolstaya	Aetherial Worlds	Russian	Anya Migdal	Russia	Alfred A. Knopf	Longlist
Gunnhild Øyehaug	Wait, Blink: A Perfect Picture of Inner Life	Norwegian	Kari Dickson	Norway	Farrar, Straus and Giroux	Longlist

=== 2019 ===
The prize was judged by Keith Gessen, Elisabeth Jaquette, Katie Kitamura, and Shuchi Saraswat and chaired by Idra Novey. The longlist was announced on September 17. Finalists were announced on October 8. The winner was announced on November 20, 2019.

2019 National Book Award for Translated Literature honorees
Author	Title	Original language	Translator	Country of Publication	Publisher	Result
László Krasznahorkai	Baron Wenckheim's Homecoming	Hungarian	Ottilie Mulzet	Hungary	New Directions Publishing	Winner
Khaled Khalifa	Death is Hard Work	Arabic	Leri Price	Syria	Farrar, Straus and Giroux	Finalists
Scholastique Mukasonga	The Barefoot Woman	French	Jordan Stump	Rwanda	Archipelago	Finalists
Yoko Ogawa	The Memory Police	Japanese	Stephen Snyder	Japan	Pantheon Books	Finalists
Pajtim Statovci	Crossing	Finnish	David Hackston	Finland	Pantheon Books	Finalists
Eliane Brum	The Collector of Leftover Souls	Portuguese	Diane Grosklaus Whitty	Brazil	Graywolf Press	Longlist
Nona Fernández	Space Invaders	Spanish	Natasha Wimmer	Chile	Graywolf Press	Longlist
Vigdis Hjorth	Will and Testament	Norwegian	Charlotte Barslund	Norway	Verso Books	Longlist
Olga Tokarczuk	Drive Your Plow Over the Bones of the Dead	Polish	Antonia Lloyd-Jones	Poland	Riverhead Books	Longlist
Naja Marie Aidt	When Death Takes Something From You Give it Back	Danish	Denise Newman	Denmark	Coffee House Press	Longlist

=== 2020 ===
The prize was judged by Heather Cleary, John Darnielle, Anne Ishii, and Brad Johnson and chaired by Dinaw Mengestu. The longlist was announced on September 16 with the shortlist following on October 6. The winner was announced on November 18, 2020.

2020 National Book Award for Translated Literature honorees
Author	Title	Original language	Translator	Publisher	Result
Miri Yu	Tokyo Ueno Station	Japanese	Morgan Giles	Riverhead Books / Penguin Random House	Winner
Anja Kampmann	High as the Waters Rise	German	Anne Posten	Catapult Press	Finalists
Jonas Hassen Khemiri	The Family Clause	Swedish	Alice Menzies	Farrar, Straus and Giroux / Macmillan Publishers	Finalists
Pilar Quintana	The Bitch	Spanish	Lisa Dillman	World Editions	Finalists
Adania Shibli	Minor Detail	Arabic	Elisabeth Jaquette	New Directions Publishing	Finalists
Shokoofeh Azar	The Enlightenment of the Greengage Tree	Persian	Anonymous	Europa Editions	
Cho Nam-Joo	Kim Jiyoung, Born 1982	Korean	Jamie Chang	Liveright / W. W. Norton & Company	Longlist
Perumal Murugan	The Story of a Goat	Tamil	N. Kalyan Raman	Black Cat / Grove Atlantic	Longlist
Fernanda Melchor	Hurricane Season	Spanish	Sophie Hughes	New Directions Publishing	Longlist
Linda Boström Knausgård	The Helios Disaster	Swedish	Rachel Willson-Broyles	World Editions	Longlist

=== 2021 ===
The prize was judged by Jessie Chaffee, Sergio de la Pava, Madhu H. Kaza, and Achy Obejas and chaired by Stephen Snyder. The longlist was announced on September 15 with the shortlist following on October 5. The winner was announced on November 17, 2021.

2021 National Book Award for Translated Literature honorees
Author	Title	Original language	Translator	Publisher	Result
Elisa Shua Dusapin	Winter in Sokcho	French	Aneesa Abbas Higgins	Open Letter Books	Winner
Ge Fei	Peach Blossom Paradise	Chinese	Canaan Morse	New York Review Books	Finalists
Nona Fernández	The Twilight Zone	Spanish	Natasha Wimmer	Graywolf Press	Finalists
Benjamín Labatut	When We Cease to Understand the World	Spanish	Adrian Nathan West	New York Review Books	Finalists
Samar Yazbek	Planet of Clay	Arabic	Leri Price	World Editions	Finalists
Maryse Condé	Waiting for the Waters to Rise	French	Richard Philcox	World Editions	Longlist
Bo-young Kim	On the Origin of Species and Other Stories	Korean	Joungmin Lee Comfort and Sora Kim-Russell	Kaya Press	Longlist
Elvira Navarro	Rabbit Island	Spanish	Christina MacSweeney	Two Lines Press	Longlist
Judith Schalansky	An Inventory of Losses	German	Jackie Smith	New Directions Publishing	Longlist
Maria Stepanova	In Memory of Memory	Russian	Sasha Dugdale	New Directions Publishing	Longlist

=== 2022 ===
The prize was judged by Nick Buzanski, Veronica Esposito, Ann Goldstein (chair), Rohan Kamicheril, and Russell Scott Valentino. The longlist was announced on September 14 with the shortlist following on October 4. The winner was announced on November 16, 2022.

2022 National Book Award for Translated Literature honorees
Author	Title	Original language	Translator	Publisher	Result
Samanta Schweblin	Seven Empty Houses	Spanish	Megan McDowell	Riverhead Books / Penguin Random House	Winner
Jon Fosse	A New Name: Septology VI-VII	Norwegian	Damion Searls	Transit Books	Finalists
Scholastique Mukasonga	Kibogo	French	Mark Polizzotti	Archipelago Books	Finalists
Mónica Ojeda	Jawbone	Spanish	Sarah Booker	Coffee House Press	Finalists
Yoko Tawada	Scattered All Over the Earth	Japanese	Margaret Mitsutani	New Directions Publishing	Finalists
Mohammed Hasan Alwan	Ibn Arabi's Small Death	Arabic	William M. Hutchins	Center for Middle Eastern Studies at the University of Texas at Austin	Longlist
Shahriar Mandanipour	Seasons of Purgatory	Persian	Sara Khalili	Bellevue Literary Press	Longlist
Olga Ravn	The Employees	Danish	Martin Aitken	New Directions Publishing	Longlist
Saša Stanišić	Where You Come From	German	Damion Searls	Tin House Books	Longlist
Olga Tokarczuk	The Books of Jacob	Polish	Jennifer Croft	Riverhead Books / Penguin Random House	Longlist

=== 2023 ===
Members of the prize jury were Geoffrey Brock, Arthur Malcolm Dixon, Cristina Rodriguez, T. Denean Sharpley-Whiting, and Jeremy Tiang (chair). The longlist was announced on September 13 with the shortlist following on October 4. The winner was announced on November 16, 2023.

2023 National Book Award for Translated Literature honorees
Author	Title	Original language	Translator	Publisher	Result
Stênio Gardel	The Words That Remain	Portuguese	Bruna Dantas Lobato	New Vessel Press	Winner
Bora Chung	Cursed Bunny	Korean	Anton Hur	Algonquin Books / Hachette Book Group	Finalists
David Diop	Beyond the Door of No Return	French	Sam Taylor	Farrar, Straus and Giroux / Macmillan Publishers	Finalists
Pilar Quintana	Abyss	Spanish	Lisa Dillman	World Editions	Finalists
Astrid Roemer	On a Woman's Madness	Dutch	Lucy Scott	Two Lines Press	Finalists
Juan Cárdenas	The Devil of the Provinces	Spanish	Lizzie Davis	Coffee House Press	Longlist
Jenny Erpenbeck	Kairos	German	Michael Hofmann	Coffee House Press	Longlist
Khaled Khalifa	No One Prayed Over Their Graves	Arabic	Leri Price	Farrar, Straus and Giroux / Macmillan Publishers	Longlist
Fernanda Melchor	This is Not Miami	Spanish	Sophie Hughes	New Directions Publishing	Longlist
Mohamed Mbougar Sarr	The Most Secret Memory of Men	French	Lara Vergnaud	Other Press	Longlist

=== 2024 ===
Members of the prize jury were Aron Aji, Jennifer Croft, Jhumpa Lahiri (chair), Gary Lovely and Julia Sanches. The longlist was announced on September 13 with the shortlist following on October 1. The winner was announced on November 20, 2024.

2024 National Book Award for Translated Literature honorees
Author	Title	Original language	Translator	Publisher	Result
Yáng Shuāng-zǐ	Taiwan Travelogue	Mandarin Chinese	Lin King	Graywolf Press	Winner
Bothayna El Essa	The Book Censor's Library	Arabic	Ranya Abdelrahman and Sawad Hussain	Restless Books	Finalists
Linnea Axelsson	Ædnan	Swedish	Saskia Vogel	Knopf / Penguin Random House	Finalists
Fiston Mwanza Mujila	The Villain's Dance	French	Roland Glasser	Deep Vellum	Finalists
Samar Yazbek	Where the Wind Calls Home	Arabic	Leri Price	World Editions	Finalists
Nasser Abu Srour	The Tale of a Wall: Reflections on the Meaning of Hope and Freedom	Arabic	Luke Leafgren	Other Press	Longlist
Solvej Balle	On the Calculation of Volume (Book I)	Danish	Barbara J. Haveland	New Directions Publishing	Longlist
Layla Martínez	Woodworm	Spanish	Sophie Hughes and Annie McDermott	Two Lines Press	Longlist
Fernanda Trías	Pink Slime	Spanish	Heather Cleary	Scribner / Simon & Schuster	Longlist
Fernando Vallejo	The Abyss	Spanish	Yvette Siegert	New Directions Publishing	Longlist

=== 2025 ===
Members of the prize jury are Stesha Brandon (chair), Sergio Gutiérrez Negrón, Bill Johnston, Annette Joseph-Gabriel and Karen Tei Yamashita. The longlist was announced on September 13 with the shortlist following on October 7. The winner was announced on November 19, 2025.

2025 National Book Award for Translated Literature honorees
Author	Title	Original language	Translator	Publisher	Result
Gabriela Cabezón Cámara	We Are Green and Trembling	Spanish	Robin Myers	New Directions Publishing	Winner
Solvej Balle	On the Calculation of Volume (Book III)	Danish	Sophia Hersi Smith and Jennifer Russell	New Directions Publishing	Finalists
Anjet Daanje	The Remembered Soldier	Dutch	David McKay	New Vessel Press	Finalists
Hamid Ismailov	We Computers: A Ghazal Novel	Uzbek	Shelley Fairweather-Vega	Yale University Press	Finalists
Neige Sinno	Sad Tiger	French	Natasha Lehrer	Seven Stories Press	Finalists
Jazmina Barrera	The Queen of Swords	Spanish	Christina MacSweeney	Two Lines Press	Longlist
Saou Ichikawa	Hunchback	Japanese	Polly Barton	Hogarth/Penguin Random House	Longlist
Han Kang	We Do Not Part	Korean	e. yaewon and Paige Aniyah Morris	Hogarth/Penguin Random House	Longlist
Mohamed Kheir	Sleep Phase	Arabic	Robin Moger	Two Lines Press	Longlist
Vincenzo Latronico	Perfection	Italian	Sophie Hughes	New York Review Books	Longlist

=== 2026 ===
Members of the prize jury are Christopher Merrill (chair), Shelley Fairweather-Vega, Javier García del Moral, John Keene and Azareen Van der Vliet Oloomi. The longlist was announced on September 15. The finalists will be revealed on October 6, 2026. The winner will be announced on November 18, 2026.

2026 National Book Award for Translated Literature honorees
Author	Title	Original language	Translator	Country of Publication	Publisher	Result
Vicente Luis Mora	Centroeuropa	Spanish	Rahul Bery	Spain	Bellevue Literary Press	Winner
Karl Ove Knausgaard	The School of Night	Norwegian	Martin Aitken	Norway	Penguin Press	Finalists
Intan Paramaditha	Night of a Thousand Hells	Indonesian	Stephen Epstein and Tiffany Tsao	Indonesia	Europa Editions	Finalists
Mohamed Mbougar Sarr	Pure Men	French	Lara Vergnaud	Senegal	Other Press	Finalists
Samar Yazbek	Your Presence Is a Danger to Your Life: Voices of Survival and Witness in Gaza	Arabic	Leri Price	Syria	Other Press	Finalists
Egana Djabbarova	My Dreadful Body	Russian	Lisa C. Hayden	Russia	New Vessel Press	Longlist
Álvaro Enrigue	Now I Surrender	Spanish	Natasha Wimmer	Mexico	Riverhead Books	Longlist
Karim Kattan	Eden at Dawn	French	Jeffrey Zuckerman	Palestine	Restless Books	Longlist
Ping Lu	To the East of the East	Chinese	Jeremy Tiang	Taiwan	World Editions	Longlist
Maria Stepanova	The Disappearing Act	Russian	Sasha Dugdale	Russia	New Directions Publishing	Longlist

== See also ==
- List of literary awards
- National Book Award
- Best Translated Book Award
