= List of Sahitya Akademi Translation Prize winners for English =

List of winners of a literary honor in India

Part of a series on

Sahitya Akademi Awards
Category
Sahitya Akademi Award winners by language
- Assamese
- Bengali
- Bodo
- Dogri
- English
- Gujarati
- Hindi
- Kannada
- Kashmiri
- Konkani
- Maithili
- Malayalam
- Marathi
- Meitei (Manipuri)
- Nepali
- Odia
- Punjabi
- Rajasthani
- Sanskrit
- Santali
- Sindhi
- Tamil
- Telugu
- Urdu
Sahitya Akademi Translation Prizes
- Assamese
- Bengali
- Bodo
- Dogri
- English
- Gujarati
- Hindi
- Kannada
- Kashmiri
- Konkani
- Maithili
- Malayalam
- Marathi
- Meitei (Manipuri)
- Nepali
- Odia
- Punjabi
- Rajasthani
- Sanskrit
- Santali
- Sindhi
- Tamil
- Telugu
- Urdu
Sahitya Akademi Yuva Puraskar
- Assamese
- Bengali
- Bodo
- Dogri
- English
- Gujarati
- Hindi
- Kannada
- Kashmiri
- Konkani
- Maithili
- Malayalam
- Meitei (Manipuri)
- Marathi
- Nepali
- Odia
- Punjabi
- Rajasthani
- Sanskrit
- Santali
- Sindhi
- Tamil
- Telugu
- Urdu
Sahitya Akademi Bal Sahitya Puraskar
- Assamese
- Bengali
- Bodo
- Dogri
- English
- Gujarati
- Hindi
- Kannada
- Kashmiri
- Konkani
- Maithili
- Malayalam
- Meitei (Manipuri)
- Marathi
- Nepali
- Odia
- Punjabi
- Rajasthani
- Sanskrit
- Santali
- Sindhi
- Tamil
- Telugu
- Urdu
Related
- Eighth Schedule to the Constitution of India
- Official Languages Commission
- List of languages by number of native speakers in India

Sahitya Akademi Translation Prizes are given each year to writers for their outstanding translations work in the 24 languages, since 1989.

== Recipients ==
Following is the list of recipients of Sahitya Akademi translation prizes for their works written in English. The award, as of 2019, consisted of ₹50,000.

Year	Translator	Title of the translation	Original Title	Original Language	Genre	Original Author	Ref.
1989	Bikram K. Das	Paraja	Paraja	Oriya	Novel	Gopinath Mohanty	
1990	V. K. Narayana Menon	Chemmeen	Chemmeen	Malayalam	Novel	Thakazhi Sivasankara Pillai	
1991	O. V. Vijayan	After the Hanging and Other Stories	Collection	Malayalam	Short Stories	O. V. Vijayan	
1992	Jai Ratan	Krishan Chander: Selected Short Stories	Collection	Urdu	Short Stories	Krishan Chander	
1993	Tejaswini Niranjana	Phaniyamma	Phaniyamma	Kannada	Novel	M. K. Indira	
1994	Dilip Chitre	Says Tuka	Selected Abhangs	Marathi	Poetry	Tukaram	
1995	R. Parthasarathy	The Tale of the Anklet	Cilappatikaram	Tamil	Epic	Ilango Adigal	
1996	Aruna Chakravarti	Srikanta	Srikanta	Bengali	Novel	Sarat Chandra Chattopadhyay	
1997	Gayatri Chakravorty Spivak	Imaginary Maps	Collection	Bengali	Short Stories	Mahasweta Devi	
1998	Kalpana Bardhan	Wives and Others	Selection	Bengali	Short Stories and Novel	Manik Bandopadhyay	
1999	Gita Krishnankutty	The Eye of God	Deivathinte Kannu	Malayalam	Novel	N.P. Mohammed	
2000	P. Sreenivasa Rao	Bharathipura	Bharathipura	Kannada	Novel	U. R. Ananthamurthy	
2001	Gopa Majumdar	Aparajito	Aparajito	Bengali	Novel	Bibhutibhushan Bandyopadhyay	
2002	Nita Kumar	Mai	Mai	Hindi	Novel	Geetanjali Shree	
2003	(Late) Sujit Mukherjee	Gora	Gora	Bengali	Novel	Rabindranath Tagore	
2004	M. Asaduddin	Lifting The Veil: Selected Writings	Collection of Chughtai	Urdu	Novel	Ismat Chughtai	
2005	Pratik Kanjilal	The Last Wilderness	Antim Aranya	Hindi	Novel	Nirmal Verma	
2006	Mohammed Zakir	Son of the Moment	Ibu-ul-Vaqt	Urdu	Novel	Nasir Ahmed	
2007	Vinay Dharwadkar	Kabir, the Weaver's	Selection	Hindi	Poetry	Kabir	
2008	Meenakshi Shivram	Topi Shukla	Topi Shukla	Hindi	Novel	Rahi Masoom Raza	
2009	Tridip Suhrud	Harilal Gandhi: A Life	Harilal Gandhi	Gujarati	Biography	Chandulal Bhagubhai Dalal	
2010	Ira Pande	T'ta Professor	T'ta Professor	Hindi	Novel	Manohar Shyam Joshi	
2011	Anju Makhija & Hari Dilgir	Shah Abdul Latif: Seeking The Beloved	Shah Jo Risalo	Sindhi	Poetry	Shah Abdul Latif Bhittai	
2012	M. L. Thangappa	Love Stands Alone	Tamil Sangam	Tamil	Poetry	Various authors	
2013	Ranjit Hoskote	I, Lalla: The Poems of Lal Ded	Lalla's Vakhs	Kashmiri	Poetry	Lal Ded	
2014	Padmini Rajappa	Kadambari	Kadambari	Sanskrit	Poetry	Bāṇabhaṭṭa	
2015	Susheela Punitha	Bharathipura	Bharathipura	Kannada	Novel	U.R. Ananthamurthy	
2016	Aniruddhan Vasudevan	One Part Woman	Maadhorubaagan	Tamil	Novel	Perumal Murugan	
2017	Ranjita Biswas	Written In Tears	Selection	Assamese	Short Stories and Novel	Arupa Kalita Patangia	
2018	Subashree Krishnaswamy	The Tamil Story - Through The Times, Through The Tides	Collection	Tamil	Short Stories	Various Authors	
2019	Susan Daniel	Kusumabale	Kusumabale	Kannada	Novel	Devanur Mahadeva	
2020	Shrinath Perur	Ghachar Ghochar	Ghachar Ghochar	Kannada	Novel	Vivek Shanbhag	
2021	Shanta Gokhale	Smritichitre :The Memoirs of a Spirited Wife	Smritichitre	Marathi	Memoir	Lakshmibai Tilak	
2022	N. Kalyan Raman	Poonachi or The Story of a Black Goat	Poonachi	Tamil	Novel	Perumal Murugan	
2023	Nabaneeta Dev Sen	Chandrabati's Ramayan	Chandrabati's Ramayan	Bengali	Epic Poetry	Chandrabati	
2024	Anisur Rahman	Hazaaron Khwahishein Aisi (The Wonderful World of Urdu Ghazals)	Hazaaron Khwahishein Aisi	Urdu	Poetry Collection	Collection of Various Poets	

== See also ==
- List of Sahitya Akademi Award winners for English
