= Tshài-bué-thng =

Taiwanese traditional soup made from leftover banquet dishes

- Alternative names: Leftovers soup
- Type: Soup
- Course: Main
- Place of origin: Taiwan
- Serving temperature: Hot

Tshài-bué-thng (Chinese: 菜尾湯; Tongyong Pinyin: Tsài wěi tāng) is a traditional Taiwanese soup made by combining the leftover ingredients and dishes from a large Taiwanese banquet (known as Pān-toh). The soup typically blends assorted meats, seafood, bamboo shoots, shiitake mushrooms, vegetables, and rich broths into a complex stew-like soup. It is often regarded as the Taiwanese take of the Chinese dish Buddha Jumps Over the Wall and the American dish Mulligan stew.

The dish originated from the frugal and agricultural society of Taiwan in the past, where every bit of food was cherished and respected. At that time, abiding by a zero-waste policy, a host would mix together the dishes left over from a feast and allow relatives and friends to take them home to prepare. Today, however, the dish has become a prized specialty at many restaurants. The dish first gained international attention after being introduced in the novel Taiwan Travelogue by Yang Shuang-zi after it won the 2026 International Booker Prize.

According to a news report from Liberty Times, Huang Wan-ling, a food culture writer who has conducted extensive research into the history of Taiwanese cuisine and authored numerous books on the subject, points out that the name of the dish is misleading. Many people mistakenly assume it is merely a hodgepodge of kitchen scraps. In reality, however, preparing Tshài-bué-thng is a meticulous and labor-intensive process – requiring seven signature dishes to be prepared in precise proportions before being combined into a single pot. These seven dishes include: white radish and pork tripe soup, pickled mustard green and bamboo shoot rib soup, braised napa cabbage with dried flatfish, Five-Willow fish, braised thick soup, fish ball soup, and braised pork belly. If even one dish is missing or the proportions are incorrect, the flavor of the resulting Tshài-bué-thng will not be right. This task is also heavily dependent on weather conditions – for instance, on particularly cold days, the dish must simmer for seven to eight hours to fully bring out its flavor.

== See also ==
- Taiwanese cuisine
- List of soups
- Buddha Jumps Over the Wall
- Mulligan stew
- Bigos
