= Yuka Igarashi =

Editor and writer

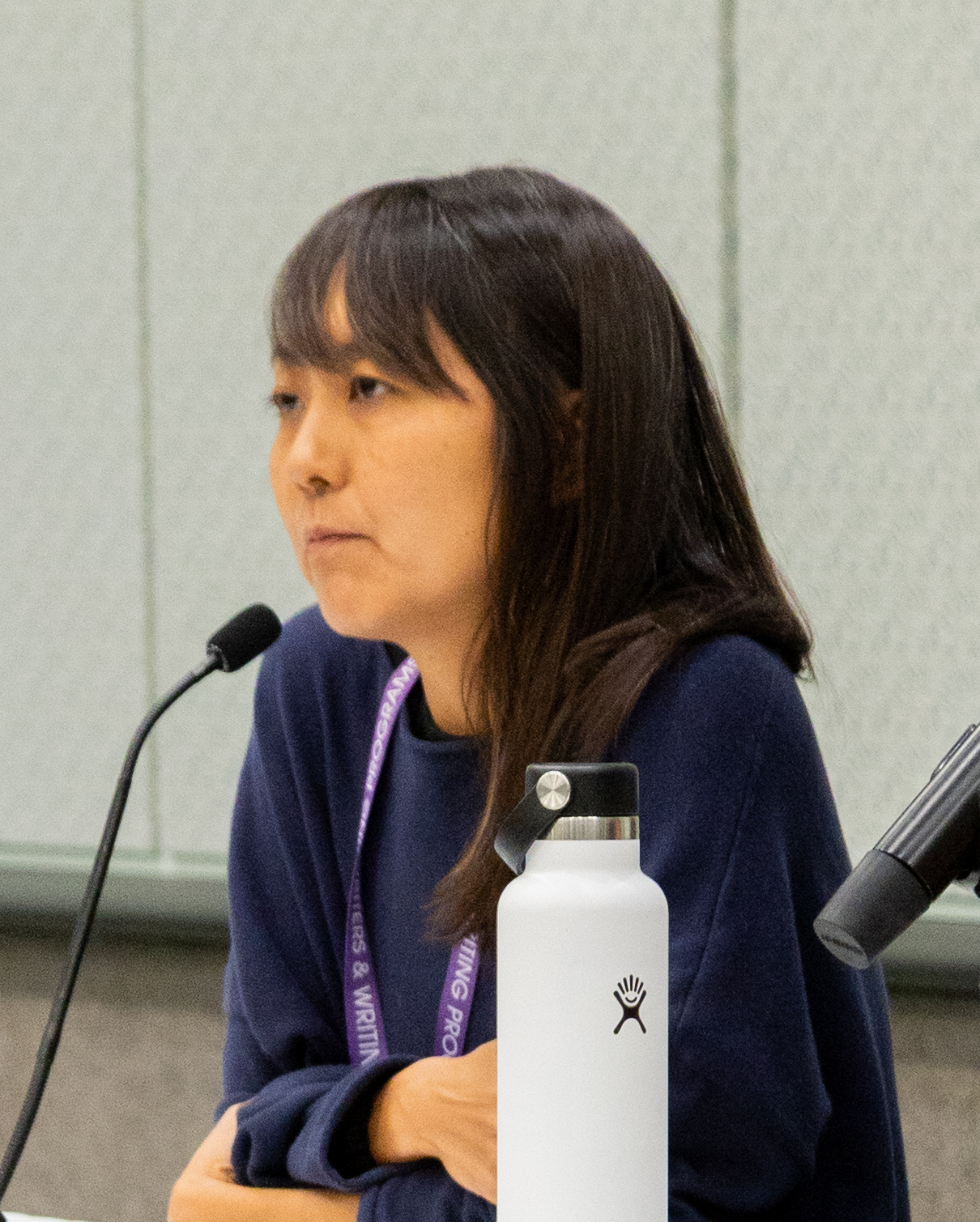
- Igarashi at AWP 2025
- Occupations: Editor, writer
- Employer: Graywolf Press

Yuka Igarashi is an American editor and writer who has held editorial roles at Granta, Soft Skull Press, and most recently Graywolf Press. In 2015, she was a founder and magazine editor for Catapult, and in 2017, she launched the annual Catapult and PEN America anthology, The Best Debut Short Stories.

== Career ==
Early in her career, Igarashi interned at Granta and subsequently became an editor for the publication for five years. In particular, she edited Granta's 127th issue on Japan which featured Japanese authors like Kimiko Hahn, Sayaka Murata, Hiromi Kawakami, Toshiki Okada, and others in translation. She also facilitated interviews with several authors including but not limited to Ruth Ozeki, Tao Lin, Rebecca Solnit, and André Aciman.

In 2015, Igarashi joined Catapult as a founder and magazine editor a few months before its launch in September. It published books, uploaded online content daily, hosted workshops for writers, and facilitated internet community through various programs. In 2016, Catapult merged with Counterpoint and Soft Skull Press. As editor-in-chief, Igarashi became Soft Skull Press' sole editor. In the early 2000s, during her time in college, Igarashi had been a fan of Soft Skull Press. Upon her assumption of leadership there, Igarashi wanted to make use of her position to return to the press' identity as a "staple of the punk underground Lower East Side" from its earlier days by reprinting authors like Eileen Myles and Lynne Tillman and soliciting work from similar lineages of literature. In 2023, Catapult announced that it would be shutting down its magazine and workshop arms in order to focus exclusively on book publishing in its own imprint as well as Counterpoint and Soft Skull Press.

From 2017 to 2022, Igarashi series-edited the annual anthology, The Best Debut Short Stories, which is a collaboration between PEN America, Catapult Books, and the guest judges brought on to read and select from each year's pool of submissions. The first edition, in 2017, had guest judges Kelly Link, Nina McConigley, and Marie-Helene Bertino. Several installments of the series have been featured in Bustle, Bookriot, and other publications.

In 2021, Igarashi left Soft Skull Press and was hired by Graywolf Press as an executive editor. Upon her hiring, longtime publisher Fiona McCrae remarked, "Yuka has been something of a trail blazer in founding Catapult magazine, as well as in her work championing new voices there and at Granta and Soft Skull Press". Since then, Igarashi has acquired and edited numerous works including those by Tsitsi Dangarembga, Shannon Sanders, and Yang Shuang-zi with translator Lin King. Her very first acquisition was Life is Everywhere by Lucy Ives.

Igarashi has been featured in interviews and pieces by Poets & Writers, Epiphany, PEN America, and others.

== Other ==
In a 2021 piece for the New Yorker, Andrea Long Chu speculated that the character Kay, in Tao Lin's novel Leave Society, was based on Igarashi.
