= Susan Daniel =

Susan Daniel may refer to:

- Susan Daniel (chemical engineer)
- Susan Daniel (translator)

== See also ==
- Suzan Daniel, Belgian lesbian activist
