= Colta.ru =

Russian Internet publication

Colta.ru (from Italian colta - "harvesting", "educated, enlightened") is a Russian Internet publication covering contemporary art and culture. The first Russian media outlet fully funded by crowdfunding using the “Share” service on the Planeta.ru website.

== History ==
In June 2012, the owner of the OpenSpace.ru portal Vadim Belyaev announced that the portal would change its concept and edition. The team led by editor-in-chief Maria Stepanova left the editorial office of the OpenSpace.ru portal in full force. The OpenSpace.ru portal in its original form worked until the beginning of July 2012. The old editorial board, headed by Maria Stepanova, decided to register a new domain and work there for several months. The OpenSpace.ru archive has been moved there from May 2008 to July 2012.

The new site Colta.ru was opened on July 16, 2012. Only art critic and editor of the "Art" section Ekaterina Dyogot left the old team.

Mikhail Ratgauz, Deputy Editor-in-Chief of Colta.ru, said regarding the substantive and conceptual difference between Colta.ru and OpenSpace.ru: “We are reducing the number of materials. This is both a compulsory measure and our long-standing desire. This means that the specific gravity of each material increases. We refuse to “beat off” the cultural process, from classical reviewing. That is, we will not write a review of the film, even if we like it very much, but we will make some generalizing material around it. We have ideas, plans for the format, but it's too early to talk about it. We hope that in the autumn we will be able to start implementing them."

On November 13, 2012, an announcement appeared on the site about its upcoming closure on November 19, unless a new source of funding was found before. On November 20, 2012, the editors said goodbye to their readers and stopped the project. Nevertheless, a month later, on December 26, Maria Stepanova announced the reopening of the site from January 14, 2013.

== Site funding model ==
The site began to function at the expense of its employees, who received compensation from OpenSpace.ru upon dismissal and invested this money in the launch of the project (registration, royalties, etc.). At the initial stage of the site's existence - 3 months - the project was funded under the crowdfunding scheme (public funding); at the same time, in the very first weeks of fundraising, 522,500 rubles were transferred to the project account out of the 600,000 required for the three months of the project's existence. As of July 27, 2012, 617,700 rubles were collected. In total, 694,800 rubles were collected, which allowed the project to last four months instead of the planned three On September 18, 2013, the next fundraising campaign was launched, 684,747 were collected, 300,000 were required.

== Special projects ==
On April 13, 2018, the site administration launched a vote "Are there moral authorities in Russia?" The editorial staff compiled an initial list of 61 candidates, which included various public and cultural figures. However, users were given the right to add their own candidates. As a result, the number of candidates exceeded a thousand, but only about half of this number managed to gain more than ten votes. Voting ended at midnight on April 25. According to its results, the first place was taken by video blogger Ilya Maddison, the second - by the IT-entrepreneur Nariman "Abu" Namazov, the owner of the imageboard 2ch.hk, the third - by the opposition politician Alexei Navalny. Russian President Vladimir Putin was also in the top ten, writer Zakhar Prilepin, countercultural figure Sergei "Pakhom" Pakhomov and rock musician Boris Grebenshchikov. The vote aroused the interest of domestic media: Kanobu, "Echo of Moscow" and others.
