= Sasha Dugdale =

British poet, playwright and translator

Sasha Dugdale FRSL
- Born: 1974 (age 51–52); Sussex, England
- Occupations: Poet, playwright, translator
- Writing career
- Notable works: Joy; Deformations; The Strongbox
- Notable awards: Forward Prize; Cholmondeley Award; Lois Roth Award; Runciman Award

Sasha Dugdale FRSL is a British poet, playwright, editor and translator. She has written six poetry collections and is a translator of Russian-language literature.

== Biography ==
Sasha Dugdale was born in 1974 in Sussex.

Dugdale has published six poetry collections with Carcanet Press: Notebook (2003), The Estate (2007), Red House (2011), Joy (2017), Deformations (2020) and The Strongbox (2024). She won the 2016 Forward Poetry Prize for Best Single Poem, entitled Joy; a Cholmondeley Award in 2017; and the Anglo-Hellenic League Runciman Award 2025 for The Strongbox. Chair of judges Sofka Zinovieff described The Strongbox as “an extraordinary collection of poetry” and praised its ability to show “how the rich inheritance of ancient Greek myth and literature continues to inspire the creation of outstanding works of art in the 21st century.”

Dugdale specialises in translating contemporary Russian-language women poets and post-Soviet new writing for theatre. She has worked both in the United Kingdom and the United States on a number of productions, translating modern Russian-language plays. She won English PEN Translates Awards for her translations of collections of poetry by the Russian poet Maria Stepanova.

From 2012 to 2017 Dugdale was the editor of Modern Poetry in Translation, publishing sixteen issues of the magazine as well as its fiftieth anniversary anthology Centres of Cataclysm (Bloodaxe, 2016). From 2015 to 2021 she directed the biennial Winchester Poetry Festival. Between 2018 and 2021 she was poet-in-residence at St John's College, Cambridge.

Dugdale's translation of Maria Stepanova's novel In Memory of Memory was shortlisted for the 2021 International Booker Prize, the 2022 Oxford-Weidenfeld Translation Prize, and the 2022 James Tait Black Memorial Prize. In 2021 it was longlisted for the National Book Award for Translated Literature. In 2022 it won the MLA Lois Roth Award. The judges’ citation noted that "Sasha Dugdale's translation is a living text, the work of a poet, as attuned to the modernist voices of Mandelstam and Akhmatova as to those of Sebald and Barthes, flowing with admirable rhythm and a stunning breadth of vocabulary. In Dugdale's hands, sentence after sentence is quotable, the shadows of the irretrievable past rippling through a complex, many-layered landscape."

Dugdale's poetry has been featured in The Guardian. She was elected a Fellow of the Royal Society of Literature in 2020. In 2025 she was one of the judges of the PEN Heaney Prize.

== Publications ==
=== Poetry ===
- (2024), The Strongbox, Carcanet Press, ISBN 9781800174085
- (2020), Deformations, Carcanet Press, ISBN 9781784108984
- (2017), Joy, Carcanet Press, ISBN 9781784105037
- (2011), Red House, Oxford Poets, ISBN 9781906188023
- (2007), The Estate, Oxford Poets, ISBN 9781903039809
- (2003), Notebook, Oxford Poets, ISBN 9781903039670

=== Translations ===
- (2026), Natalya Vorozhbyt, Three Mates; in Ukraine Unbroken: Five Plays, Nick Hern Books, ISBN 9781839045639
- (2026), Maria Stepanova, The Disappearing Act, Fitzcarraldo Editions (UK), ISBN 9781804272329, New Directions (US), ISBN 9780811239400
- (2024), Maria Stepanova, Holy Winter 20/21, Bloodaxe, ISBN 9781780376950
- (2021), Maria Stepanova, The War of the Beasts and the Animals, Bloodaxe, ISBN 9781780375342
- (2021), Maria Stepanova, In Memory of Memory, Fitzcarraldo Editions (UK), ISBN 9781913097530, New Directions (US), ISBN 9780811228831
- (2017), Natalya Vorozhbyt, Bad Roads, Nick Hern Books, ISBN 9781848427143
- (2009), Natalya Vorozhbyt, The Grainstore, Nick Hern Books, ISBN 9781848420458
- (2008), Elena Shvarts, Birdsong on the Seabed, Bloodaxe, ISBN 9781852247836
- (2004), Vasily Sigarev, Ladybird, Nick Hern Books
- (2004), Tatiana Shcherbina, Life Without: Selected Poetry & Prose 1992-2003, Bloodaxe, ISBN 9781852246426
- (2003), The Presnyakov Brothers, Terrorism, Nick Hern Books
- (2003), The Presnyakov Brothers, Playing the Victim, Nick Hern Books, ISBN 9781854597595
- (2003), Vasily Sigarev, Black Milk, Nick Hern Books
- (2002), Vasily Sigarev, Plasticine, Nick Hern Books, ISBN 9781854596901

== Awards ==
- — (2025), Anglo-Hellenic League Runciman Award, The Strongbox
- — (2024), International Hellenic Prize, The Strongbox, (shortlist)
- — (2022), Lois Roth Award, In Memory of Memory
- — (2020), T. S. Eliot Prize, Deformations, (shortlist)
- — (2017), Cholmondeley Award
- — (2017), Poetry Book Society Choice - Joy
- — (2016), Forward Poetry Prize for Best Single Poem, Joy
- — (2003), Eric Gregory Award
