= Pyre (novel) =

2013 novel by Perumal Murugan

- First edition (Tamil)
- Author: Perumal Murugan
- Original title: Pūkkul̲i
- Translator: Aniruddhan Vasudevan
- Cover artist: Ahlawat Gunjan, copyright Harshad Marathe
- Language: Tamil
- Genre: Domestic Fiction, Novel
- Publisher: Kalachuvadu Publications, Hamish Hamilton (English translation)
- Publication date: 2013
- Publication place: India
- English publication date: 2016
- Media type: Print
- Pages: 216 (English translation)
- ISBN: 978-0-670-08775-4
- OCLC: 1026816496
- Dewey Decimal: PL4758.9.P389 P85 2016

Pyre (Tamil: பூக்குழி, romanized: Pūkkuḻi, lit. 'flower pot') is a novel by Perumal Murugan that describes a love story within social caste-induced hatred. It was originally published in Tamil in 2013 and subsequently translated into English by Aniruddhan Vasudevan in 2016. The novel was longlisted for the DSC Prize for South Asian Literature 2017. It was also selected for the International Booker Prize longlist 2023.

The Tamil version is dedicated to R. Ilavarasan, a young Dalit man who was discovered dead on a railway track after his inter-caste marriage had brought about violence from his community.

== Plot summary ==
The novel is set in Kattuppati, a remote Tamil Nadu village in Southern India. Kumaresan and Saroja, newly married, arrive by bus to live at Kumaresan's house on a rock in the village. Their marriage is an inter-caste one, performed in secret after they eloped from Saroja's house in Tholur, and Kumaresan believes that no one shall know about Saroja's different caste if they deny it. When they reach their house, Marayi, Kumaresan's mother, curses her ill-luck that her son married Saroja. Her dirge attracts the attention of many village residents who flock to the house to see the new bride and tease her about the marriage. They do not believe that a person as fair as Saroja would belong to the same caste as them.

As days pass by, Saroja has to put up with Marayi's constant insults and the village folks' questions and comments about her caste. A visit to Kumaresan's grandparents turns sour as his grandfather hits him and says that he has brought disgrace upon the family. Saroja is reminded about their affair in Tholur where Kumarasen had come to work with Bhai Anna's help. Kumarasen worked in a soda-bottle packing and distributing unit for Soda Bottle Bhai and was Saroja's neighbor. They often stole glances at each other until some soda bottles exploded in Kumaresan's hands and Saroja left him some food. Knowing that her father and brother would never approve of their marriage, Saroja ran away with Kumarasen to get married.

At their village, a council decides to boycott them from any social gathering and a public well. Kumarasen and Saroja are still invited to a coming-of-age ceremony of a distant relative from another village. Kumarasen tries to settle down with a soda-bottle distributing business spread across a few villages. He takes Saroja with him to Virichipalayam, where he has found a shop with money raised from friends. Saroja hopes he would settle down in Virichipalayam and away from his village. They buy a plateful of presents for the ceremony they are invited to. They decide to go directly to the temple where the ceremony will be held rather than walk down with other people from their village. At the ceremony, Kumarasen is humiliated by his uncle and asked to leave immediately.

Back home, Kumarasen discovers that Saroja is pregnant. Saroja believes that a child's coming would convince Kumarasen to leave the village with her. Kumarasen has to leave the village for a couple of days to visit his shop but Saroja urges him to come back at night however late it is. That night, Saroja goes to the bushes near the rock to defecate and overhears Marayi conspiring with other villagers to kill her in Kumaresan's absence. Determined not to get caught, she hides herself deep within the shrubbery. When the villagers realize where she is, they set the bushes alight from all sides with Saroja within it, just as Kumaresan's cycle is heard returning to the village.

== Themes ==
Describing the subject, Aniruddhan Vasudevan, the translator of the novel wrote in the translator's note:

This is a novel about caste and the resilient force that it is, but it is also about how strangely vulnerable caste and its guardians seem to feel in the face of love, and how it often seems to assert itself both in everyday acts of discrimination as well as in moments of most unimaginable violence.

=== Caste intolerance ===
In a society yet to shake off the lingering feudal yesteryear honour, daring to love and live together across caste boundaries, thereby defying and attempting to undo the caste pride is a formidable act that entails its own share of “punishment”, most of the time meted out by none other than the caste councils in the den of casteism, the village system.

— Purnachandra Naik in Love in the Times of 'Caste Killings', Round Table India, September 2, 2016

Penguin India's description of the novel describes its caste theme, "Despite the strident denials of the young couple, the villagers strongly suspect that Saroja must belong to a different caste. It is only a matter of time before their suspicions harden into certainty and, outraged, they set about exacting their revenge. A devastating tale of innocent young love pitted against chilling savagery, Pyre conjures a terrifying vision of intolerance."

A review says that the caste atrocities in the novel indicates "violence and complicity... by the assent of the majority". Throughout the story, Saroja and Kumaresan have to face caste-based humiliations in the form of fiery words and dehumanising physical abuse. Though Saroja's exact caste or its hierarchical relationship with Kumaresan's caste is unknown to the villagers, her fair skin, as opposed to their dark skins, becomes reason enough for them to suspect her caste. The inter-caste marriage becomes a reason for defilement of the caste purity of the entire village from which, therefore, Kumaresan and his family is boycotted.

=== Contrast between city and village life ===
The novel is set in multiple locations and life in the city is often contrasted with life in the village. Through symbols of "hard rocky surface(s)" and a "barren, harsh" landscape, the village describes the "ossified impermeable social structure organised around caste lines which does not allow any social fluidity". In contrast, the city is free, where "[Saroja] can flash a smile and is reciprocated by a smile".

Reviewers have also pointed out the rich evocation of the Kongu land in the story, accepting that Murugan's "eloquent' language and "razor-sharp metaphors" bring nature to life in the village scenes, especially with paragraphs like:

She had never set her bare feet on a rock before. It touched her with the combined sensation of Kumaresan’s soft hands and his rough embrace, the memory of which made her shiver with pleasure every time she walked on the rock’s surface. But she had to be cautious. Even a slight tumble and her toenails might get wrenched out, or she might fall feet first. Eventually, she got used to walking barefoot on the rock. Like a child learning to walk, she carefully placed one foot in front of another.

One review, however, criticizes the representation of country life as bland, something that Murugan has painted as "alien and exotic" in order to engage the reader who has never been to rural India. Another review, which advocates similar concerns, dismisses it as an issue with the setting of the novel, which it claims is set in the 1980s.
