= No Knives in the Kitchens of This City =

2013 novel by Khaled Khalifa

- First edition
- Author: Khaled Khalifa
- Language: Arabic
- Genre: Novel
- Publisher: Al Ain Publishing House
- Publication date: 2013
- Pages: 260
- ISBN: 978-9774-90-222-2

No Knives in the Kitchens of This City (Arabic: لا سكاكين في مطابخ هذه المدينة, romanized: La sakakin fi matabikh hadhihi al-madina) is a novel by the Syrian novelist Khaled Khalifa. The novel was first published in 2013 by Al Ain publishing house in Cairo. The novel was awarded the "Najib Mahfouz Prize for Literature" in 2013, it was included in "Alqaseerah" final list of the 2014 International Prize for Arabic Fiction, known as the "Arab Booker Prize".

== About the novel ==
The title of the novel describes the fear and fragmentation during the half-century that the Arab world has lived. It is a novel about a society that lived with oppression and desires.

Through the biography of a family, they discovered that all their dreams died and turned into ashes, just as the mother's body turned into junk that must be disposed of so that others can continue to live. It is a novel that raises and asks basic questions and tries to reveal the facts of the devastation of Arab life under authoritarian regimes that have insulted and destroyed the lives and dreams of Arab citizens.

Here, Khaled Khalifa writes about everything that is kept secret in Arab life in general and Syrian life in particular. It is a novel about grief, fear, and human death.
