= Lin King =

American writer and translator

- 金翎
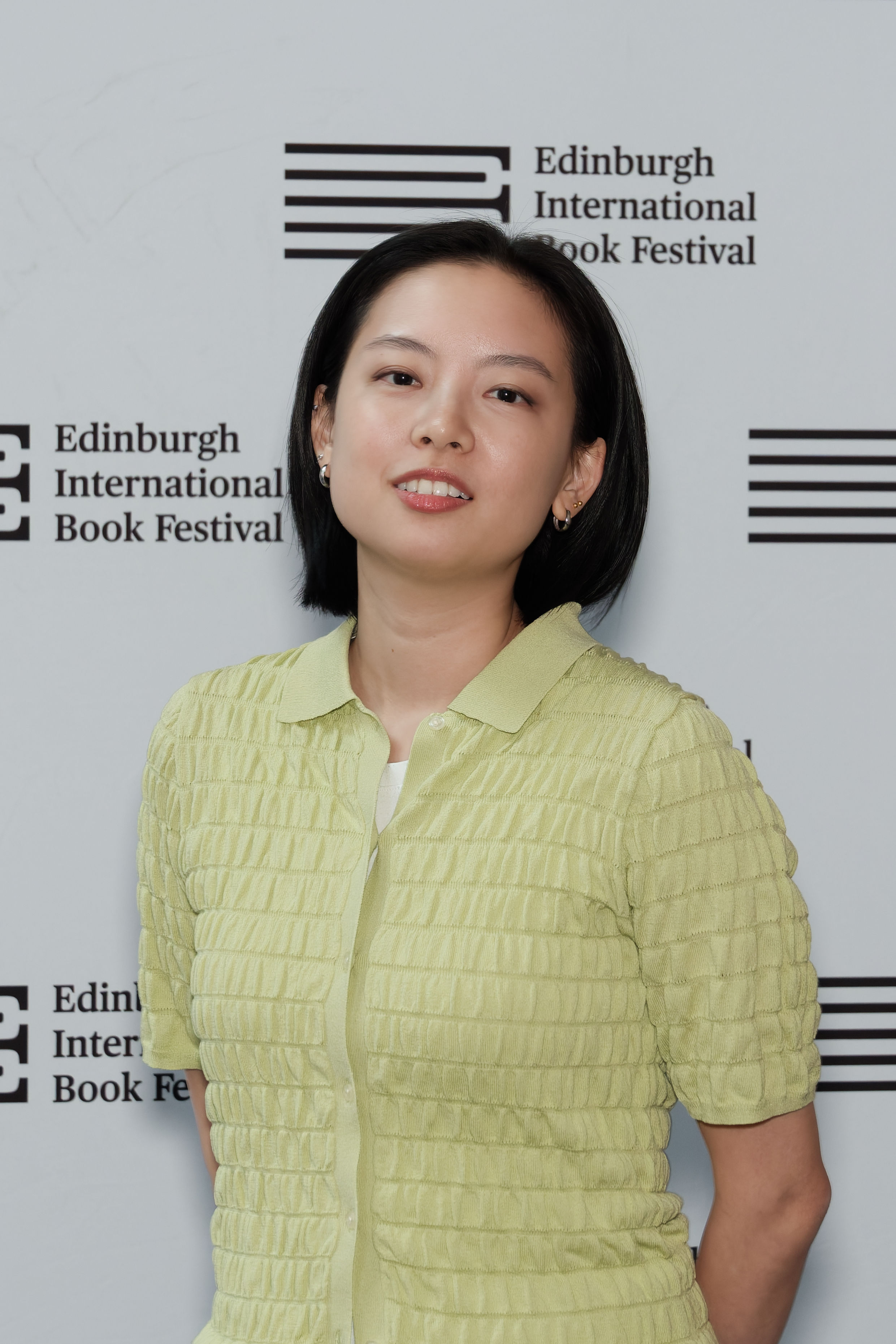
- King in 2026
- Born: December 6, 1993 (age 32); New York, U.S.
- Education: Princeton University (BA); Columbia University (MFA)
- Occupations: Writer, translator
- Awards: Freeman Award; National Book Award for Translated Literature; International Booker Prize
- Website: https://www.lin-king.net/

Lin King (Chinese: 金翎; pinyin: Jīn Líng; born December 6, 1993) is a Taiwanese and American writer and translator. In 2024, King and writer Yang Shuang-zi won the National Book Award for Translated Literature for the English translation of Taiwan Travelogue, before winning the International Booker Prize for it in 2026.

== Early life and education ==
King was born in New York to Taiwanese parents. Both her parents, Kwang-Yu King and Erin C. Shih, worked in architecture firms in New York City for 10 and 8 years, respectively. When King was one year old, she and her parents returned to Taiwan and settled in the capital, Taipei. King grew up in Taiwan roughly seven years after the end of martial law in Taiwan. She holds both Taiwan (ROC) and United States citizenship. She is fluent in Mandarin Chinese, Japanese, and English, with some proficiency in Taiwanese Hokkien.

In Taiwan, King attended the Taipei American School and graduated in 2012. After high school, she returned to the U.S. to attend Princeton University. As an undergraduate at Princeton, she became a writer for The Daily Princetonian. She graduated from Princeton with a Bachelor of Arts in English literature, Creative Writing, and East Asian studies in 2016. She then earned a Master of Fine Arts (M.F.A.) from Columbia University in fiction and literary translation in 2022 under Elissa Schappell and Jeremy Tiang.

== Career ==
King's own writing in English has appeared in numerous publications including Joyland, Boston Review, and others. In 2018, King received the PEN/Robert J. Dau Short Story Prize for Emerging Writers for her short story, "Appetite", published in SLICE. It was subsequently published in that year's edition of The PEN America Best Debut Short Stories.

In 2023, King released an English translation of The Boy from Clearwater: Book 1 (Chinese: 來自清水的孩子) by Yu Pei-Yun and Zhou Jian-Xin, published by Levine Querido. She had read and worked with its translations in Taiwanese, Mandarin Chinese, and Japanese. Booklist, in a starred review, called it "a triumph of translation by gifted polyglot King, who artfully rendered the Taiwanese Hoklo, Mandarin Chinese, and Japanese in the original." It later won a Freeman Award in 2023. The Boy from Clearwater: Book 2 received the same award in 2024.

As a graduate student at Columbia University, King worked on Taiwan Travelogue, after which it was published in 2024 by Graywolf Press. King had met Yang through the Asian American Writers' Workshop where King's translation of an excerpt from Yang's novel Seasons of Bloom appeared. Yang then asked King to read and mull over Taiwan Travelogue in Mandarin Chinese for a possible translation, after which King pitched its English translation to numerous publishers before landing at Graywolf Press. There, King worked with Yuka Igarashi on calibrating the book's execution as a "meta-novel".

In 2024, King and Yang won the National Book Award for Translated Literature for the English translation of Taiwan Travelogue. The following year, King and Yang received the Baifang Schell Book Prize for Outstanding Literature Translated from Chinese Language, presented by the Asia Society's China Books Review. Later in 2025, King's translation won the American Literary Translators Association's First Translation Prize and was shortlisted for the National Translation Award. In 2026, King's translation became the first literary work translated from Mandarin to win the International Booker Prize.
