= Khaled Khalifa =

Syrian writer and scriptwriter (1964–2023)

- Native name: خالد خليفة
- Born: 1 January 1964 Urum al-Sughra, Aleppo Governorate, Syria
- Died: 30 September 2023 (aged 59) Damascus, Syria
- Occupation: Novelist; Screenwriter; Poet
- Years active: 1993–2023
- Notable works: In Praise of Hatred
- Notable awards: Naguib Mahfouz Medal for Literature (2013)

Website
- khaledkhalifa.com

Khaled Khalifa (Arabic: خالد خليفة; 1 January 1964 – 30 September 2023) was a Syrian novelist, screenwriter and poet. He was nominated three times and shortlisted twice for the International Prize for Arabic Fiction (IPAF). Some of his novels have been translated into English, German, French, Spanish and other languages.

His works frequently criticized the Syrian Baathist government, leading to their ban in the country.

== Biography ==
=== Early life ===
Khalifa was born on 1 January 1964 in the village Urum al-Sughra near Aleppo to a Syrian family of olive farmers and agricultural machinery traders. Khalifa’s extended family was engaged in olive cultivation and the production of olive oil, as well as in the trade of spare parts for trucks, cars and agricultural machines. He was the fifth child in a family of nine boys, four girls, two mothers, and a father who worked as a policeman until he retired in 1965. He first studied in the city of Aleppo, where his family lived at the time, and graduated from Al-Mutanabbi High School in 1982. He continued his studies at the University of Aleppo and graduated from the Faculty of Law in 1988.

Khalifa began his literary activity at the age of fifteen by publishing his poems in the Syrian Ba’athist Al-Thawra newspaper. He also participated in the University of Aleppo Forum, one of the famous literature festivals in Syria. This celebration attracted a large audience of students and other citizens before the authorities closed it down in 1988 under the pretext that leftist opposition politicians used its platform to publicize their ideas.

== Works ==
=== Screenwriting ===
As a screenwriter, Khalifa wrote several television dramas, including Rainbow (Kaws Kozah) and Memoirs of Al-Jalali (Arabic: سيرة الجلالي, romanized: Serat Al-Jalali), and various documentaries, short films, as well as the scenario for the feature film The Shrine Door (Arabic: باب المقام, romanized: Bab al-Maqam).

=== Novels ===
Khalifa began writing novels at the age of twenty and continued writing poetry as a way to exercise his literary skills. He wrote his first novel as a university student, but destroyed it immediately thereafter. That novel, he then felt, heavily borrowed other authors’ voices. He thus began searching for his own literary voice. In 1990, soon after graduating and completing his military service in Damascus, he stopped writing poetry and devoted himself completely to novels and screenplays.

His first published novel, Haris al-Khadi'a (The Guard of Deception), appeared in 1993. His second novel, Dafatir al-Qurbat (The Gypsy Notebooks), was suppressed by the Arab Writers Union for four years after its publication in 2000. Khalifa spent thirteen years working on In Praise of Hatred (Madih al-karahiya), his third novel, which told how the lives of one family are affected by the conflict in Hama between the Syrian government and the Muslim Brotherhood. It was published in Damascus in 2006, until it was banned by the Syrian government, and republished in Beirut. In Praise of Hatred was a finalist for the International Prize for Arabic Fiction (IPAF) (2008).

Khalifa had stated these sorts of book bans came from a bureaucracy which does not represent the higher levels of government. Instead, he favoured negotiations between artists and Syrian authorities to ensure freedom of speech and that his work was not intended to advocate any political ideology.

Commenting on his In Praise of Hatred, Khalifa said:

Above all, I wrote this novel in defense of the Syrian people and in order to protest against the suffering they have endured as a result of the religious and political dogmas that have tried to negate their ten-thousand-year civilization.

His fourth novel was La sakakin fi matabikh hathihi al-madina was published in Cairo in 2013 and as No Knives in the Kitchens of this City in English translation by Leri Price. It dealt with the suffering of Syrians under the rule of the Baath party headed by Bashar Al-Assad. This work won the Naguib Mahfouz Medal for Literature and was shortlisted for the IPAF in 2014. His fifth novel, Death Is Hard Work, also translated by Leri Price, was named a finalist for the 2019 National Book Award for Translated Literature. No One Prayed Over Their Graves, Khalifa's sixth novel, was longlisted for the IPAF in 2020. In September 2023, the English translation was longlisted for the National Book Award for Translated Literature.

== Death ==
Khalifa died of cardiac arrest at his home in Damascus, on 30 September 2023, at the age of 59.

== Works ==
- Haris al-Khadi'a, 1993 (The Guard of Deception)
- Dafatir al-Qurbat, 2000 (The Gypsies' Notebooks)
- Madih al-karahiya, 2006 (translated by Leri Price as In Praise of Hatred, 2013)
- La sakakin fi matabikh hadhihi al-madina, 2013 (translated by Leri Price as No Knives in the Kitchens of This City, 2016)
- Al-mawt 'amal shaq, 2016 (translated by Leri Price as Death Is Hard Work, 2019)
- Lam yusil 'alayhum ahad, 2019 (translated by Leri Price as No One Prayed Over Their Graves, 2023)
- Nisr 'ala al-Tawelah al-Mojawerah, 2022 (An Eagle at the Next Table)
- Samak mayet yatanaf qoshour al-Laymoun 2024 (Dead fish breathing lemon peels)

== See also ==
- Syrian national literature since the mid-20th century
