= Maria Stepanova (poet) =

Russian poet, novelist, and journalist (born 1972)

- Мария Степанова
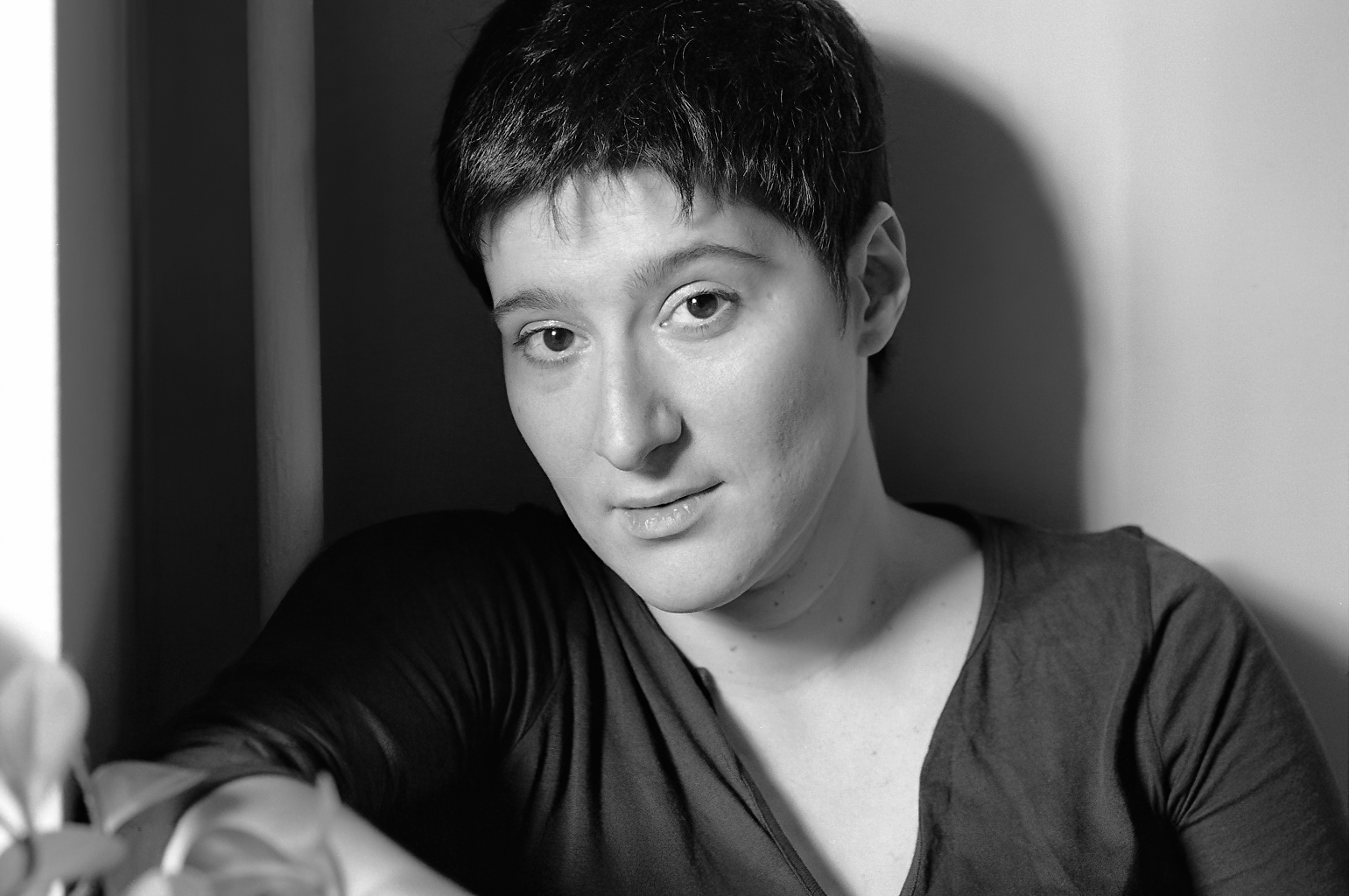
- Stepanova in 2006
- Born: June 9, 1972 (age 54); Moscow, RSFSR
- Education: Maxim Gorky Literature Institute
- Occupation: Poet
- Writing career
- Notable awards: Moscow Account

Maria Mikhailovna Stepanova (Russian: Мари́я Миха́йловна Степа́нова; born June 9, 1972) is a Russian poet, novelist, and journalist. She is the current editor of Colta.ru, an online publication specializing in arts and culture. In 2005, she won the prestigious Andrei Bely Prize for poetry. More recently, she also received the 2017–2018 Big Book Prize for her novel In Memory of Memory (Pamyati pamyati).

== Biography ==
Born in Moscow on June 9, 1972, Stepanova studied at the Maxim Gorky Literature Institute, where she graduated in 1995. She published poetry in Russian-language literary magazines such as Zerkalo, Znamya, Kriticheskaya massa, and Novoe Literaturnoe Obozreniye, as well as in anthologies like Babylon, Urbi, and Ulov. Stepanova won many important Russian literary prizes, including the Pasternak Prize and the Andrei Bely Prize in 2005, and the Moscow Account Prize in 2006, 2009, and 2018.

In 2007, Stepanova founded Openspace.ru, an online magazine dedicated to Russian-language arts and culture. Per Stepanova, The magazine "would provide the audience with modern, up-to-date, passionate view on what is going on in Russian culture and in the outer world." She served as editor-in-chief of Openspace.ru until 2012, when she left the publication along with the majority of her editorial staff due to a withdrawal of funding from private investors. Stepanova disagreed with investor oversight amid the uncertain Russian political landscape; this drove her to found Colta.ru, the first Russian media outlet supported entirely by crowdfunding. Funded using crowdfunding platform Planeta.ru, Colta.ru guaranteed Stepanova more editorial freedom as editor-in-chief. Like Openspace.ru, the new magazine also covers Russian arts and culture.

Stepanova's work has been translated into English, Hebrew, Spanish, Italian, German, Finnish, French and other languages. She was also appointed Siegfried-Unseld Guest Professor at Humboldt Universität in Berlin for the 2018–2019 school year.

In 2023, she was elected as a Royal Society of Literature International Writer.

== Work ==
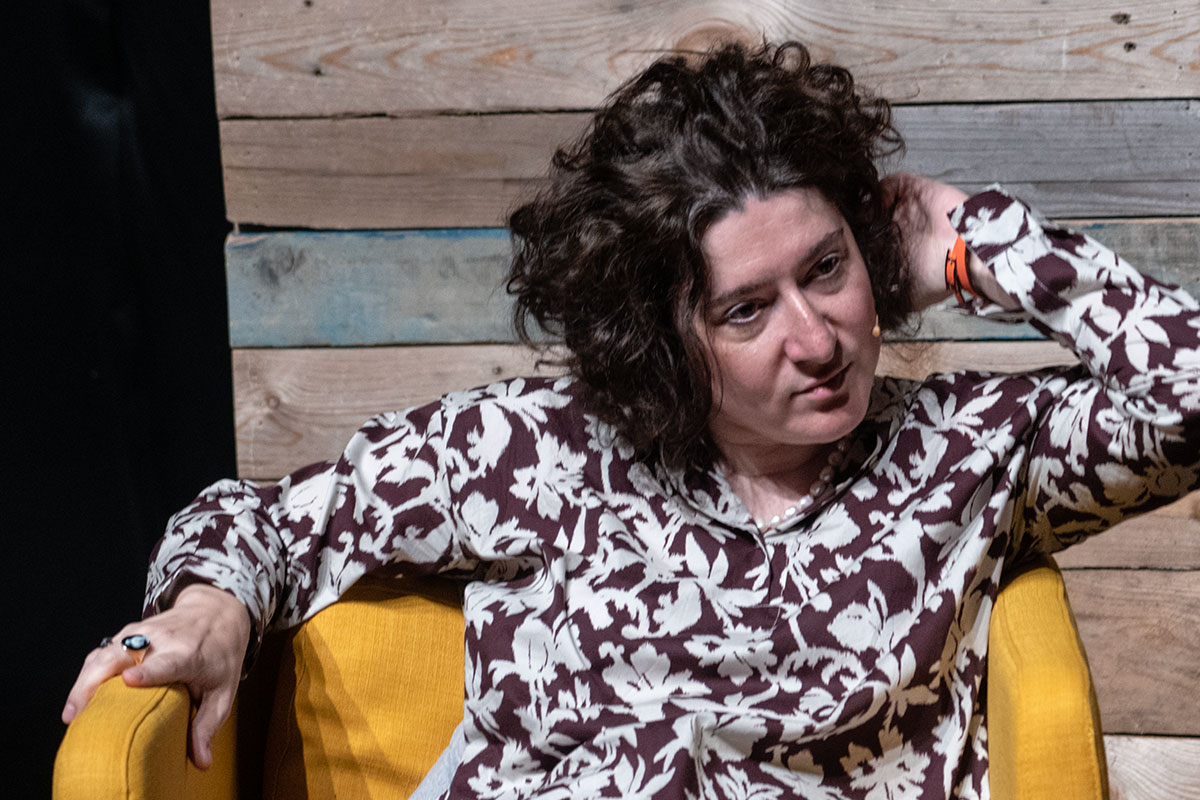
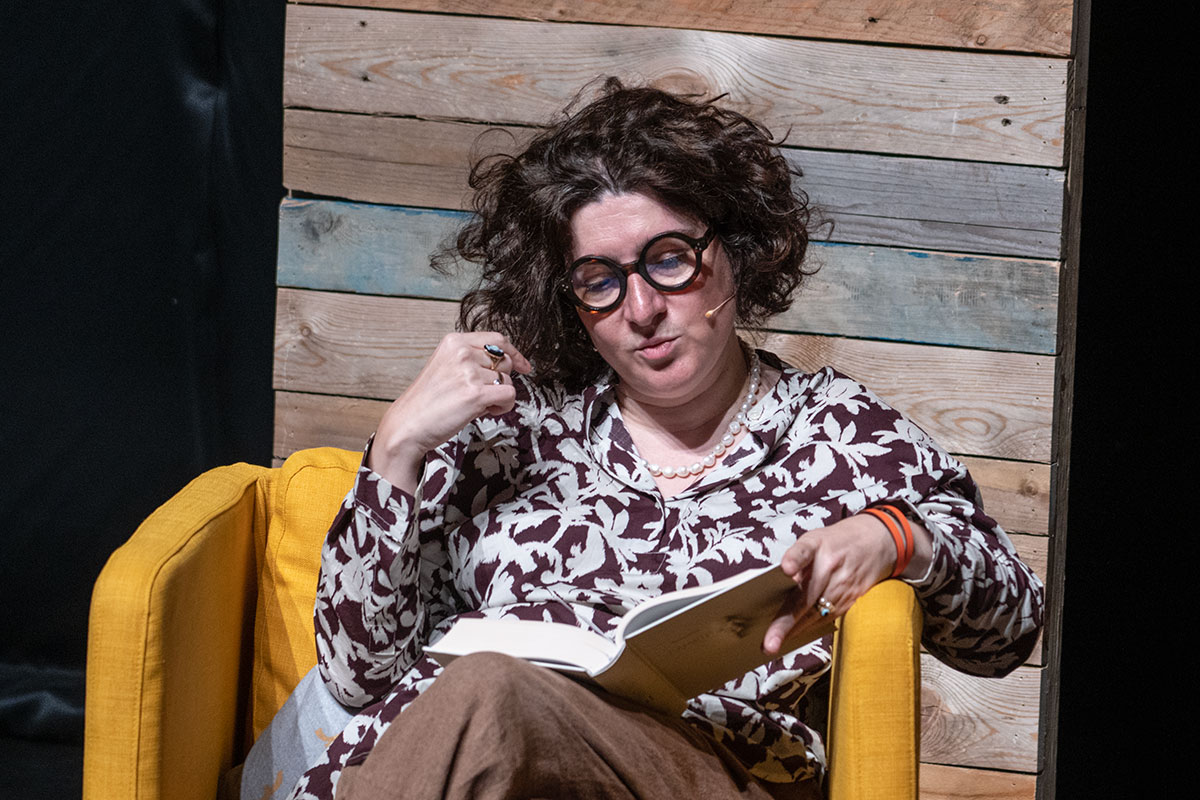
LiteratureXcange Festival in Aarhus (Denmark 2023)

Stepanova's poetry has been highly influential in contemporary Russian literature. She is considered to have repopularized the traditional ballad as a poetic genre, employing and subverting conventional prosody and form. She also frequently uses skaz, a Russian narrative technique featuring fragmentary idiomatic language and unclear narration. Translator Catherine Ciepiela writes: "For [Stepanova] the logic of form trumps all other logics, so much so that she will re-accent or truncate words to fit rigorously observed schemes."

Stepanova herself conceives of poetry as form of resistance, a resistance that often manifests itself in political memory. Specifically, Stepanova coins the term "postmemory", to describe the middle-ground where politics and memory coincide. Translator Sasha Dugdale emphasizes the importance of memory and myth in her work, both poetic and journalistic. This investigation of memory includes her recent highly-acclaimed novel In Memory of Memory, in addition to the Colta.ru 90s Festival, which attempts to dismantle political myths about the 1990s.

== Bibliography ==
Stepanova's writing has been translated into six English-language books, three of which debuted in 2021.

- Relocations: Three contemporary Russian women poets, translated by Catherine Ciepiela and Anna Khasin (Brookline, MA: Zephyr Press, 2013).
- The Flower Dies under a Skin of Glass, translated by Sasha Dugdale (Hong Kong: The Chinese University of Hong Kong Press, 2019).
- In Memory of Memory, translated by Sasha Dugdale (London: Fitzcarraldo; New York: New Directions, 2021).
- The Voice Over, edited by Irina Shevelenko (New York: Columbia University Press, 2021).
- War of the Beasts and the Animals, translated by Sasha Dugdale (Hexham, Northumberland: Bloodaxe Books, 2021).
- The Disappearing Act, translated by Sasha Dugdale (New York, NY: New Directions Publishing, 2026).

Her poetry has also appeared in several English-language literary journals, including Aufgabe, Atlanta Review, Jacket, and Poetry International.
