= In Praise of Hatred =

Syrian novel

- 2014 edition
- Author: Khaled Khalifa
- Language: Arabic
- Publisher: Dar Amisa for Publishing and Distribution
- Publication date: 2006
- Publication place: Syria
- Pages: 391
- Awards: International Prize for Arabic Fiction

In Praise of Hatred (Arabic: مدح الكراهية, romanized: Madih al-Karahiya) is the third novel by the Syrian novelist Khaled Khalifa. However, the novel was published for the first time in Dar Amisa for Publishing and Distribution, specifically in Beirut year 2006. Then, got published again by Dar Al- Adab for Publishing and Distribution in Lebanon. Moreover, (In Praise of Hatred) has been translated into eight more languages, including English, Spanish, French, Italian and German. As it was entered into the "short" list of the international Prize for Arabic Fiction, known as the (Booker Prize). Next, it was longlisted Foreign Fiction Prize, year 2013. It also appeared on at least one list of the 100 best novels of all time.

== About the Novel ==
This novel breaks onto an era in the history of Syria as it raises questions about the conflict between both the fundamentals and authorities. Including the end and the beginning of the seventies and the eighties of the last century as well as it was a culture of hatred almost wiped out everything. In addition, the (In Praise of Hatred) leads readers from Aleppo, women and their secret lives to Afghanistan and passing by Riyadh, Aden, London and many other places.

== Translations ==
This novel has been translated into many languages:

- English, printed by Dar Random and translated by the British translator (Lery Price), year 2012.
- Spanish, printed by Dar Random and translated by (Cora Sepza), year 2012.
- French, printed by Dar Act Sud and translated by the Syrian translator (Rania Samara), year 2011.
- Italian, printed by Dar Bombiani in Milan and translated into Italian by (Francesca Prividello), year 2011.
- German
- Dutch, printed by Dar Dakhous and translated by (Afka Hovik), year 2011.
- Norwegian, printed by Dar Minuskill and translated by (Gayer Yual Sgokseth), year 2011.
- Danish, printed by Dar Corridor, year 2014.
