= One Part Woman =

Novel by Perumal Murugan

- Paperback English edition, 2013
- Author: Perumal Murugan
- Translator: Aniruddhan Vasudevan
- Language: Tamil, English
- Publisher: Kalachuvadu Publications (Tamil), Penguin Books (English)
- Publication date: 1 December 2010
- Publication place: India

One Part Woman (pronounced [mɑːd̪oɾʉbɑːgən]) is a Tamil novel written by Indian writer Perumal Murugan titled "Mathorupagan" (மாதொருபாகன்). Initially published by Kalachuvadu Publications in 2010, it was later translated into English by Aniruddhan Vasudevan and published in 2013 in India by Penguin Books, and in 2018 in the US by Grove Atlantic. Set during the colonial era in the Southern state of Tamil Nadu in India, it deals with the social stigma that a married couple faces due to their childlessness, and the lengths they go to conceive.

== Background ==
The idea for writing the novel came to Murugan on witnessing couples around him suffer due to the inability to have a child. The novel is set in the Tiruchengode town in Tamil Nadu, from which Murugan hails, and its main characters in the book belong to the Kongu Vellalar Gounder caste, which he himself belongs to. The original name of the novel comes from the word Madhorubaagan, the Tamil name for the androgynous form of Lord Shiva in Hindu mythology. In 2005, Murugan was awarded a grant by the India Foundation for the Arts to do the background research for the novel. In the course of his research, he came across a societal practice that existed in the past to deal with childlessness, which he decided to include in the book. The existence of such a practice has been a subject of dispute. Murugan stated in an interview with The Hindu that there was no documentary evidence relating to the custom and that details about it were passed on orally.

== Plot ==
Kali and Ponna are a couple living in Tamil Nadu. Despite having been married for 12 years, they are unable to conceive a child. Their childlessness becomes a source of constant taunts from family members and fellow villagers, who variously attribute it to family curses, God's wrath, or their ancestors' ill behavior. Desperate, the couple try several remedies, prayers and offerings but to no avail. Kali is often encouraged to have a second wife, an idea he considers but ultimately rejects. As a last resort, their families put forward the suggestion that Ponna go to the chariot festival of the androgynous god Ardhanarishvara, where on the 18th day, societal taboo relating to extramarital sex is relaxed and consenting men and women may sleep together. Kali is repulsed by the idea but brings up the subject with Ponna, who responds by saying she would go if he wished so. Kali feels betrayed by her reaction and eventually grows colder to her. The following year, Ponnu's family takes matters into their own hands by luring Kali out of the house, while convincing her that he has given his consent for her to go to the festival. She does so and finds a man she considers "a god" to impregnate her. Meanwhile, Kali returns home to find Ponna gone, leading him to breakdown and curse Ponna.

== Themes ==
One Part Woman deals with the themes of ritual and tradition, and the power these elements have in societies, relationships and individuals. The novel explores how a community's pathological obsession estranges a loving couple and breaks up their happy marriage. It also depicts life in pre-Independence rural India, focusing in particular on the rigid social hierarchy set by the caste system. In the mostly agrarian Gounder caste to which Kali and Ponna belong, the status of the landowner is directly proportional to the number of sons he has. Ponna is pressurized to conceive to improve her husband's social standing and to stop people from bringing up the lack of inheritance for her family's property. Thus, a major portion of the couple's woes come not from their own desire to have a child, but their community's stigmatization towards those who do not have any. The novel also highlights the stratification of Indian society along caste lines, which is brought out through the concept of untouchability. Part of Kali's distress over Ponna attending the festival stems from the thought that his wife might have intercourse with an untouchable.

The novel also examines how patriarchal customs in India turn women into victims of gender essentialism. Women are expected to conform to a fixed female identity, and Ponna's failure to do so results in the repression of her individual self. In connection to this, the novel explores the condition of marriage and gender roles within it. When the couple remains childless for years, Kali is recommended for a second marriage, almost naturally placing the blame on the woman. Murugan has pointed out that marriage in India "is not a democratic institution [...] The man always has and continues to have a wider space in which to function, [while] the woman is constantly constrained." The novel also describes how patriarchy leads to the oppression of female sexuality, by viewing it solely as means to motherhood and the benefit of her husband and progeny alone.

== Reception ==
The novel has garnered critical acclaim. Meena Kandasamy of The Guardian praised Murugan's "unsurpassed ability to capture Tamil speech, [which] lays bare the complex organism of the society he adeptly portrays" as well as Vasudevan's translation for "preserving the mood of the original". The New Yorker called it "a subtly subversive novel [that] considers the constraints of tradition [...] In simple yet lyrical prose, Murugan shows how their standing in the world depends on their offspring." Lucy Scholes of The National summed it up as a "moving, quietly magnificent portrait of a tender, loving marriage that’s buckling under the impossible strain of meddling busybodies and the weight of conventional societal expectations." She opined that the translation was "competent" even though "occasional phrase[s] [that] strike as a little too modern does sneak through." Kirkus Reviews concurred, writing: "Poignant and sweet, the novel suffers only from a certain roughness in the prose; something, it seems, has been lost in translation."

The original Tamil novel was awarded the ILF Samanvay Bhasha Samman in 2015. The English version was awarded The Tamil Literary Garden Award for Translation in 2014, and longlisted for the 2018 National Book Award for Translated Literature. It was also announced as the Sahitya Akademi Translation Prize awardee in 2018, but the High Court of Madras passed a stay order on it after agitators filed a plea against it. Vasudevan consequently declined the award, citing an unwillingness to pursue a legal battle for the same. In the wake of these events, Sahitya Akademi jury member Githa Hariharan filed a counter-affidavit contending that issues within the purview of litterateurs could not be subjected to judicial review.

== Controversy ==
"Author Perumal Murugan has died. He is no god, so he is not going to resurrect himself. Nor does he believe in reincarnation. From now on, Perumal Murugan will survive merely as a teacher, as he has been. [...] Please leave him alone. Thanks to everyone."

— Perumal Murugan, in a Facebook post published in January 2015.

In December 2014, the novel attracted the attention of various caste-based factions in Tamil Nadu, who claimed that the novel's depiction of extramarital sex during the Ardhanarishvara festival insulted their deity and the women of their caste. Nearly 10,000 copies of the controversial portions of the novel were distributed by the protesters in houses and among women to mobilize people against the book. Protests broke out in Tiruchengode, where copies of the book were burned and an official complaint, demanding a ban against the book and the arrest of the publisher and author, was lodged. After a district-wide strike was declared, Murugan issued a clarification that he would remove all references to the place where events in the novel take place. As protests continued, he attended a peace meeting presided over by local administrators, where he was forced to render an unconditional apology and agreed to withdraw the book itself. In the aftermath of these events, he posted what has been called a "literary suicide" note on his Facebook page, withdrawing all his written work and declaring a self-imposed end to his career as a writer.

In 2016, a petition was filed with the Madras High Court to nullify the settlement against publication of the book. Concurrently, multiple criminal complaints were filed against Murugan on the grounds of obscenity, blasphemy, and defamation. The High Court ultimately ruled in favor of the author, invalidating the settlement and dismissing the criminal complaints. In the verdict delivered in July 2015, Chief Justice Sanjay Kishan Kaul held:

The choice to read is always with the reader. If you do not like a book, throw it away. All writings, unpalatable for one section of the society, cannot be labelled as obscene, vulgar, depraving, prurient and immoral. The author and artistes like him cannot be under a constant apprehension that if he deviates from the oft-treaded path, he will face adverse consequences. Let the author be resurrected to what he is best at. Write.

— Excerpts from the Madras High Court ruling, July 2016 (Madras High Court, India 5 July 2016), Text, archived from the original on 7 July 2016.

The judgment was hailed in the press as a landmark victory for free speech in India.

== Sequel ==
In 2014, Murugan wrote two books, அர்த்தநாரி (pronounced [ərt̪t̪ənɑːɾɪˑ]) and ஆலவாயன் (pronounced [ɑːləʋɑːjən]) as "dual sequels" to One Part Woman, both picking up from the end of the original novel but each following different storylines. However, the protests against the original broke out in the time leading up to the printing and release of the books, thus curtailing its publication. Subsequent to the High Court ruling on the matter, the books were translated into English by the original translator, Aniruddhan Vasudevan, as A Lonely Harvest and Trial by Silence respectively, and were released in December 2018 by Penguin Random House. The books were well received by critics, who praised the novels' indigenous writing style, strong characters and the themes they dealt with. The two books were jointly shortlisted for the JCB Prize for Literature 2019.
