= Roque Larraquy =

Argentine writer

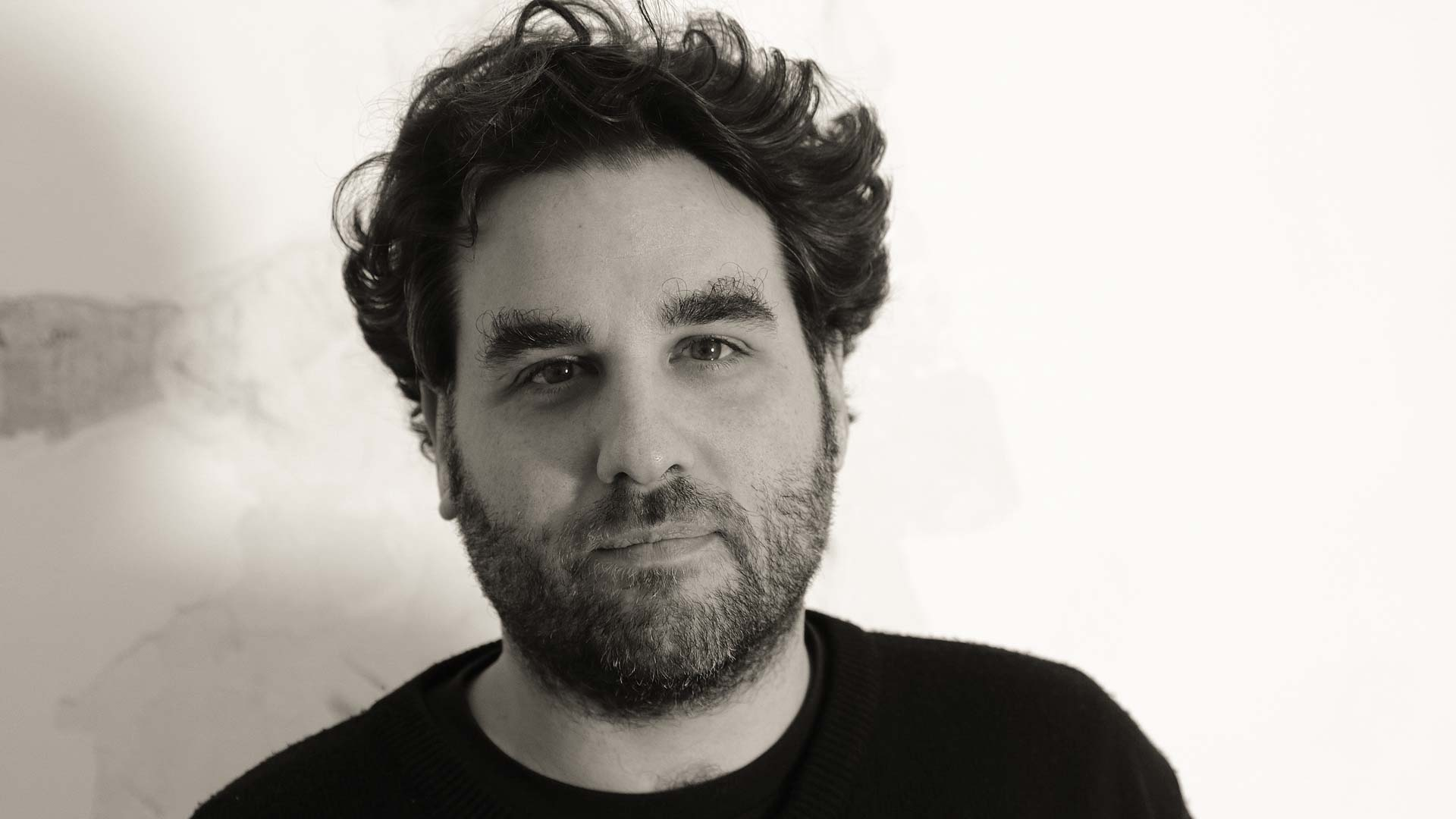
Image of Roque Larraquy

Roque Larraquy (Buenos Aires, 1975) is an Argentine writer and screenwriter. He is the author, among other texts, of the novels Comemadre (2011) translated into English, German, French, Italian, Portuguese, Turkish and Persian, nominated for the National Book Award in the USA and for the Best Translated Book Award in 2018; Informe sobre ectoplasma animal (2014), an illustrated book made in collaboration with the visual artist Diego Ontivero, translated into English and Italian, and La telepatía nacional (2020), selected among the best ten books written in Spanish of 2020 by The New York Times. His literary has received critical acclaim. .

In 2016, he was named the director of Argentina’s first degree-granting program in creative writing, housed at the Universidad Nacional de las Artes. He graduated from the Universidad de Buenos Aires in literary studies. As a professor, he taught audiovisual design at the Universidad de Buenos Aires, film and television screenwriting at the Universidad del Centro de la Provincia de Buenos Aires, and narrative writing at the Universidad Nacional de las Artes.

== Links ==
- Comemadre
- The Horrifying Joy of Roque Larraquy’s "Comemadre"
- BOMB Magazine | Roque Larraquy’s Comemadre
- ¡Pobres guillotinados!
