= Taiwan Travelogue =

2020 novel by Yang Shuang-zi

- Author: Yang Shuang-zi
- Original title: 臺灣漫遊錄
- Translator: Lin King
- Language: Chinese
- Publisher: Graywolf Press
- Publication date: 2020
- Pages: 320 (ebook, 1st edition)
- Awards: Golden Tripod Award (2020); Best Translation Award (2024); National Book Award for Translated Literature (2024); International Booker Prize (2026)
- ISBN: 978-1-64445-315-5

Taiwan Travelogue
- Traditional Chinese: 臺灣漫遊錄
- Simplified Chinese: 台湾漫游录
Transcriptions
Standard Mandarin
- Hanyu Pinyin: Táiwān Mànyóu Lù

Taiwan Travelogue (Chinese: 臺灣漫遊錄; pinyin: Táiwān Mànyóu Lù) is a novel by Taiwanese writer Yang Shuang-zi. Written in Mandarin Chinese, it was first published in 2020 in Taiwan. The book follows fictional Japanese writer Aoyama Chizuko's 1938 visit to Taiwan, then a Japanese colony, and her developing relationship with her Taiwanese translator, whom she knows as Ō Chizuru. The book is framed as Chizuko's autofiction originally published in 1954 and derived from a travelogue she serialized in 1938 during the trip, rediscovered and translated from Japanese into Chinese by Yang in the 21st century.

Taiwan Travelogue, translated into English by Lin King, won the 2024 National Book Award for Translated Literature and the 2026 International Booker Prize.

== Synopsis ==
The novel is presented as an autofiction written by a Japanese author, Aoyama Chizuko (青山 千鶴子), based on her year-long journey through the Japanese-ruled Taiwan at the outset of the Second Sino-Japanese War. Although invited and sponsored by the colonial authorities, Chizuko has little interest in cooperating with the imperialist agenda through propaganda writing about Taiwan. Instead, she finds companionship in her local interpreter, a cultured and multilingual Taiwanese woman known to her as Ō Chizuru (王 千鶴), whom she nicknames Chi-chan. Chizuru shares Chizuko's passion for food and introduces her to Taiwanese cuisine; each chapter is named after a Taiwanese dish.

As their relationship deepens, Chizuko cannot help but feel that Chizuru is also trying to keep her distance. Chizuko becomes increasingly curious about her interpreter's past while struggling to understand the feelings Chizuru carefully conceals. The pair travel across Taiwan, including to Tainan, where they play sleuths investigating a dispute between two students at a girls' school that mirrors their own relationship. After Chizuko repeatedly makes advances and invites Chizuru to abandon her impending marriage and move to Japan with her, Chizuru resigns as her interpreter. Only later does Chizuko come to understand how Chizuru may have felt about her. In the twelfth and final chapter, Chizuko meets Chizuru again. However, the introduction to the book, purportedly written by a Japanese scholar, notes that the chapter did not appear in the original draft, suggesting that what happens in this later addition should instead be understood as Chizuko's wishful thinking.

The book includes footnotes and a translator's note purportedly written by Yang, identified as Yang Jo-hui (楊若暉; Yáng Ruòhuī), who notes that Yang Shuang-zi is a pen name shared with her twin sister Yang Jo-tzu (楊若慈; Yáng Ruòcí). It also includes multiple forewords and afterwords, all fictional, by Chizuko's adopted daughter, Chizuru, and Chizuru's own daughter. In this framing, Chizuko originally serialized a travelogue in Japanese-language publications during her 1938 journey across Taiwan, before writing a fictionalized version published in Japan in 1954 under the title Taiwan Travelogue. After going out of print, it was republished as My Taiwan Travelogue with Tshian-ho̍h. The fictionalized version was first translated from Japanese into Chinese by Chizuru, or Tshian-ho̍h as she is known in Hokkien, in the 1970s, and self-published by Chizuru's daughter in a limited, censored 1990 release following the lifting of martial law in Taiwan, under the title A Japanese Woman Author's Taiwan Travelogue. Jo-hui, together with her elder sister Jo-tzu, discovered the book during a trip to Japan decades later. Despite her illness, Jo-hui produced a new Chinese translation, published in 2020. In addition to these fictional paratexts, the English translation includes non-fictional footnotes and a translator's note by the actual translator, Lin King.

Controversially, when Taiwan Travelogue was first published by Springhill Publishing in Taiwan, the obi credited Chizuko as the author and Yang as the translator, while the cover credited both as co-authors. Despite the copyright page identified the true authorship, the design drew mixed responses, and some readers alleged fraud, having purchased the book under the impression that it was genuinely a rediscovered Japanese travelogue. Since its third print in 2021, the book design of its Taiwanese version only credited Yang as the author and added editor's note before the introduction: "From its first page to its last, this book is a work of fiction by design. Through the guise of a translated text, it seeks to capture the reality of its era."

== Themes ==
One of the main themes of Taiwan Travelogue is colonialism. Yang described the inspiration for the novel as Taiwanese people's feelings towards colonisation:

Both Korea and Taiwan were once colonies of the Japanese Empire, but Koreans seem to feel uniformly resentful of that history, whereas Taiwanese people regard it with a much more conflicted mix of distaste and nostalgia. Using a contemporary Taiwanese lens, I wanted to untangle the complex circumstances that Taiwan's people faced in the past, and to explore what kind of future we ought to strive toward.

In the novel, Chizuko's tour of Taiwan is sponsored by the Japanese government. Although she learns about Taiwan, her narrative is, according to Christopher T. Fan's review in the Los Angeles Review of Books, "told from the partial perspective of a bleeding-heart colonizer", whose opinions are "cartoonish and ethnographic—and smacking of exoticization", complaining about colonization only in private.

Another theme of the book is identity. In the introduction, the fictional scholar Hiyoshi Sagako expresses her concern at being called a "Japanese scholar"; although she is ethnically Japanese, she explains, she was born in Taiwan and is therefore "subpar". Fan on the Los Angeles Review of Books notes that this shows how "colonial hierarchies cut both ways". The relationship between Chizuro and Chizuko raises the question of whether a colonizing Japanese woman and a colonized Taiwanese woman can be equals.

Mu-Hsi Kao Lee, writing in Taiwan Insight, called Taiwan Travelogue a "yuri" novel in which "familiar character tropes and narratives intertwine with the complex identities of coloniser/colonised and the unreliable first-person perspective of Aoyama Chizuko". Chialan Sharon Wang, writing in Taiwan Lit, expands on this, stating that the relationship "reflect[s] the Taiwan-Japan colonial relationship within the conventions of the shōjo shōsetsu (girls' novel) genre", making it "a hybridized form of Taiwan's historical yuri fiction". Apart from the central relationship between Chizuro and Chizuko, there is also the relationship between a Taiwanese and a Japanese student at the Tainan girls' school in chapter six. Here, the Taiwanese student, Tân, subverts the colonial connotations of the term "lí-ya". Literally meaning "hey you" this became used by Japanese to address Taiwanese people. However, Tân uses it as a term of endearment.

Another important theme is food, which the novel uses to describe Taiwanese culture and history. Each chapter is named after a type of food. The Los Angeles Review of Books review describes the novel as "a museum of Taiwanese culture", assisted by the non-fictional footnotes.

Finally, translation and language are major themes. Wang describes the novel as metafiction "rife with literary allusions". These allusions include Japanese colonial period writers such as Mitsuru Nishikawa, Haruo Satō, and Jōkichi Hikage. Meanwhile, the multiplicity of languages creates liminal positions for the characters. Chizuru's name is written Chinese: 王千鶴, which can be read as Wáng Chiēnhò in Mandarin Chinese, Ō Chizuru in Japanese, or Ông Tshian-ho̍h in Taiwanese; Wang states that her "aliases demonstrate her desire to both mimic and appropriate the colonial language" and emphaises "the ethnic and class differences... within the Taiwanese translator herself".

== Reception ==
Taiwan Travelogue received Taiwan's 2021 Golden Tripod Award. The Japanese version was published by Chuokoron-Shinsha in 2023 and won Japan's Best Translation Award in 2024. The English version, translated by Lin King, was published by Graywolf Press in the US in 2024 and by And Other Stories in the UK in 2026. It won the 2024 National Book Award for Translated Literature, the 2025 Baifang Schell Book Prize Award for Outstanding Translated Literature from Chinese Language, and the 2026 International Booker Prize. Natasha Brown, the chair of the Booker Prize jury, said the novel "pulls off an incredible double feat: It succeeds as both a romance and an incisive post-colonial novel." As of May 2026, translation rights to the book have been secured in 22 languages.

Kirkus Reviews called the novel a "moving account of friendship in the shadow of the Japanese Southern Expansion policy". Publishers Weekly stated "Yáng offers rich reflections on colonialism and translation along with delightful depictions of Taiwanese delicacies". The Financial Times wrote that "Taiwan Travelogue is a multi-layered meditation on language and longing, and on the many ways in which we travel only to arrive where we started". Shi Shi wrote in Whynot, an outlet of Radio Free Asia, that in confronting Taiwan's history of Japanese colonial rule, Yang "offered an unconventional answer, and in doing so fulfilled her aspiration of 'liberating women through yuri fiction'".

Christopher Shrimpton reviewed in the Times Literary Supplement that, despite being a "pleasant, well-intentioned novel", Taiwan Travelogue suffers from a thin and inconsequential story, "the central relationship is diffused by a trundling narrative and a fondness for lists [...] and never approaches anything like romantic tension." He noted that "a distractingly cartoonish tone (the author also writes manga), not helped by Lin King's often awkward translation, softens the edges even more".
