= Death Is Hard Work =

2016 novel by Khaled Khalifa

- First edition (Arabic)
- Author: Khaled Khalifa
- Original title: Mawt ʻamal shāqq (الموت عمل شاق)
- Translator: Leri Price
- Language: English, translated from Arabic
- Genre: War Stories, War fiction, Fiction, History
- Publisher: دار نوفل; New York: Farrar, Straus and Giroux, 2019
- Publication date: 2016
- Publication place: Syria
- English publication date: February 12, 2019
- Media type: Print (Hardcover)
- Pages: 180 p. (English 1st ed.)
- OCLC: 1036202550

Death Is Hard Work (Arabic: الموت عمل شاق, romanized: Al-mawt 'amal shaq) is a novel written by Syrian novelist Khaled Khalifa. Published originally in 2016, it was translated from Arabic into English by Leri Price and published in 2019. The story is set in Syria as three siblings — Bolbol, Hussein, and Fatima — journey to complete their dead father's final wish of being buried next to his sister, Layla, in their hometown of Anabiya. The normally short drive turns into a few days' journey full of stress and violence as they must travel through warring territory with constant checkpoints they are stopped at.

The novel was one of the finalists of the National Book Awards and has been notably reviewed by sources like The Wall Street Journal, Kirkus Reviews, and The Los Angeles Times.

== Background ==
Death Is Hard Work was written in light of the ongoing Syrian civil war (2011-current). At this point, the Syrian civil war had set a nation against itself. Multiple military sectors were competing for the upper hand, making civilian life dangerous as towns and roads became war zones.

In 2013, during the difficult and violent conflict, author Khaled Khalifa suffered a heart attack; he was temporarily bed-bound in a hospital. During this time he reflected, with the constant noise of bombs bursting in the background, on the question of what would happen to his body if he were to die during this wartime. His reflections resulted in this novel focused on familial conflict regarding a corpse needing burial within a war zone.

Considerable parallels are seen between the war in Death Is Hard Work and the current Syrian civil war, as both show how war affects normal life.

== Plot summary ==
During the civil war in Syria, a rebel leader by the name of Abdel Latif al-Salim lay dying in a Damascene hospital. Abdel reveals his dying wish to be buried beside his sister Layla in his hometown of Anabiya to his son Bolbol, who steps up and pledges to honor his father's wishes, regardless of the troubles that he may encounter along the way. Bolbol then tells the news of their father's death to his sister, Fatima, and brother, Hussein, who both agree to help Bolbol accomplish his father's wish.

Bolbol sets out with his siblings to cross Syria with Abdel's corpse in tow. This journey proves to be more complex than originally thought; with the addition of military checkpoints every few miles, a few hours journey is turned into a days-long odyssey.

At the first of many military checkpoints, the guards recognize Abdel's corpse, and set out to have his dead body arrested for crimes against the regime. After much discussion with many guards, Bolbol manages to bribe the authorities to permit the body's free passage, allowing the group to continue their voyage. As similar events continue to occur with each passing checkpoint, Bolbol contemplates how easy this journey would be if only they were transporting sacks of cumin rather than a dead body. This leads Bolbol to reminiscence on his past, recalling particular details of his youth, such as the neighborhood he grew up in, and the practical effects of being raised during wartime.

After calling in a favor, the group stops at Bolbol's childhood friend, Lamia's (whom he was passionately in love and wrote poetry to, but could not marry) house after dropping Abdel's body off in the local morgue for the night. Over the course of their stay, Lamia and her husband, Zuhayr, offer to help the group pass the next few checkpoints with relative ease, due to Zuhayr's family connections to the regime. It is also revealed that Lamia continues to be an object of Bolbol's obsession. Bolbol spends the night longing for the old days, when he was in love with Lamia. This leads directly into Bolbol recounting an old story regarding the relationship between Abdel and his second wife, Navine, particularly from when they met, to when they got married after the death of Adbel's first wife and mother to his children.

With the corpse rapidly decaying, the guards at each checkpoint begin to provide leniency to the group more readily, allowing them swifter passage just to be rid of the sight. After the group passes a man's half-eaten corpse, an argument breaks out between Bolbol and Hussein about how easy it would be to simply leave their father's corpse there to be eaten by wolves, and no one would be the wiser. This leads Bolbol to provide backstory on Hussein, explaining his tendencies to overreact and lash out at loved ones, and his long history of causing trouble with family. Meanwhile, the corpse's decay has gotten to the point where the scent can no longer be masked with cologne.

After stopping for the night in their van, the group is attacked by wild dogs after the scent of the corpse, leaving the siblings panicked and increasingly on-edge. At the peak of this panic, Hussein picks a fight with Bolbol, who goes down quite easily with a few punches. The stress of their journey has begun to break the siblings, as they all resolve to sob in silence for the night.

After passing through several more checkpoints, the group is stopped by an extremist group, who end up withholding passage from Bolbol until he completes a "religious reeducation course." Left with no other choice, Hussein and Fatima, who has been struck mute, continue on without Bolbol, even more determined to reach Anabiya now that the corpse shows signs of maggot infestation. The two siblings reach Anabiya before sundown, and meet with a cousin and uncle of theirs: the only surviving relatives in the village. Plans are made to bury the body at morning prayer. Bolbol arrives at the village and rejoins his siblings, having been turned over to his uncle by the extremist group. That night, each sibling reflects on how little they desire to see each other after the burial.

After the burial, Bolbol resolves to be addressed only by his original name, Nabil. Fatima has gone permanently mute from the shock of the journey. Hussein quite uncharacteristically keeps to himself. The siblings begin their journey home, and each show a large degree of relief as they pass through the checkpoints with ease, now that they are not in possession of their father's corpse. Hussein and Fatima drop Bolbol off at his neighborhood in Damascus, and leave without exchanging words. Bolbol contemplates how his house smells of his father's corpse, and how he wants his face to melt under the hot water like his father's corpse had melted away in rot.

== Characters ==
=== Main characters ===
- Abdel Latif al-Salim – Father of Bolbol, Hussein, and Fatima, second husband to Navine. Nicknamed "The Anabiyan" after his hometown, he was a major rebel leader in the civil war. His death and subsequent burial are the driving elements of the novel.
- Bolbol – Middle child, middle son of Abdel and his first wife from Anabiya. Usually described as weak, fearful, and paranoid. At his father's death, Bolbol shows unusual courage and determination to honor his father's wish to be buried in his hometown, Anabiya.
- Hussein – Oldest child, older son of Abdel and his first wife from Anabiya. Hotheaded and temperamental. Enjoys commanding others, especially through the use of aphorisms. Had the dream of being successful and powerful but those plans fell through to leave him as a minibus driver.
- Fatima – Youngest child, only daughter of Abdel and his first wife from Anabiya. Loves gossip, and generally very emotional and empathetic. Feels compelled to reunite the family after her father's death, to keep the peace within the family. Known to have two children, an older son and a younger daughter. She is described to live in a male-dominating life both in marriage and in her intermediate family.

=== Secondary characters ===
- Navine – Second wife to Abdel. Worked as an art teacher before marrying Najeeb. She has two kids with Najeeb- Hitam and Ramy. Her husband Najeeb dies in a road accident on his way to Beirut. After the death of her husband and sons she marries Abdel Latif.
- Layla – Sister to Abdel. Committed suicide by dousing herself in kerosene and setting herself ablaze in order to avoid an arranged marriage to a man she could not love.
- Mamdouh – Fatima's ex-husband. Studied under Abdel during high school years.
- Hiyam – Bolbol's ex-wife. Divorced Bolbol, disappearing with their son, named after Abdel Latif.
- Lamia – Bolbol's childhood friend and ex-lover. Dedicated to helping people in need; known to house upwards of 40 refugees in her house at once. Received letters of poetry from Bolbol, but never pursued the relationship.
- Zuhayr – Lamia's husband. Went to prison before marrying Lamia. Family has ties to the regime, but is sympathetic to the rebel cause.
- Hitam - Navine's oldest son who was a doctor. He along with Navine treated wounded people from the revolution who were turned away from hospitals at their house. He was arrested at an air force Mukhabarat and tortured to death.
- Ramy - Navine's youngest son who graduated with a business degree and went on to serve in the military. After his brother's death, he joins the armed rebellion and fights till his last gasp.
- Naif - Abdel Latif's brother who finally buries Abdel Latif.

== Reception ==
Death Is Hard Work received attention and praise from reviewers, with Middle East Eye calling it "a road trip novel unlike any other." and The Guardian noting how the novel is "robust in its doubts, humane in its gaze and gentle in its persistence."

Elliot Ackerman of The New York Times directly compares Khalifa to American author William Faulkner stating "Many fine American writers have claimed the mantle of Faulkner's successor ... With "Death Is Hard Work," Khaled Khalifa has, intentionally or not, also laid claim to that title." Similar appreciation was given by Nadia Ismail of The Columbia Journal.
