= Oxford Poets =

Oxford Poets is an imprint of the British poetry publisher Carcanet Press.

The imprint was established in March 1999 when the founder and editor of Carcanet Press, Michael Schmidt, acquired the Oxford University Press poetry list. OUP's authors had included such critically acclaimed poets as Fleur Adcock, Joseph Brodsky, Greg Delanty, Alice Oswald, Craig Raine, and Jo Shapcott. Oxford University Press's decision to abandon its poetry list in November 1998 provoked a literary firestorm in the British media.

Though published by Carcanet, the Oxford Poets list has retained an element of editorial independence. Two major contemporary writers, the Irish poet Bernard O'Donoghue and the English poet, editor, and translator David Constantine currently oversee the imprint.
