= Steven Epstein =

Steven or Stephen Epstein may refer to:

- Steven Epstein (music producer), American classical music producer
- Steven Epstein (academic), professor at Northwestern University
- Stephen Epstein (cardiologist), American physician
- Stephen Epstein (Korean studies), Victoria University of Wellington

== See also ==
- Stephan R. Epstein (1960–2007), British economic historian
