= Perumal Murugan =

Indian writer (born 1966)

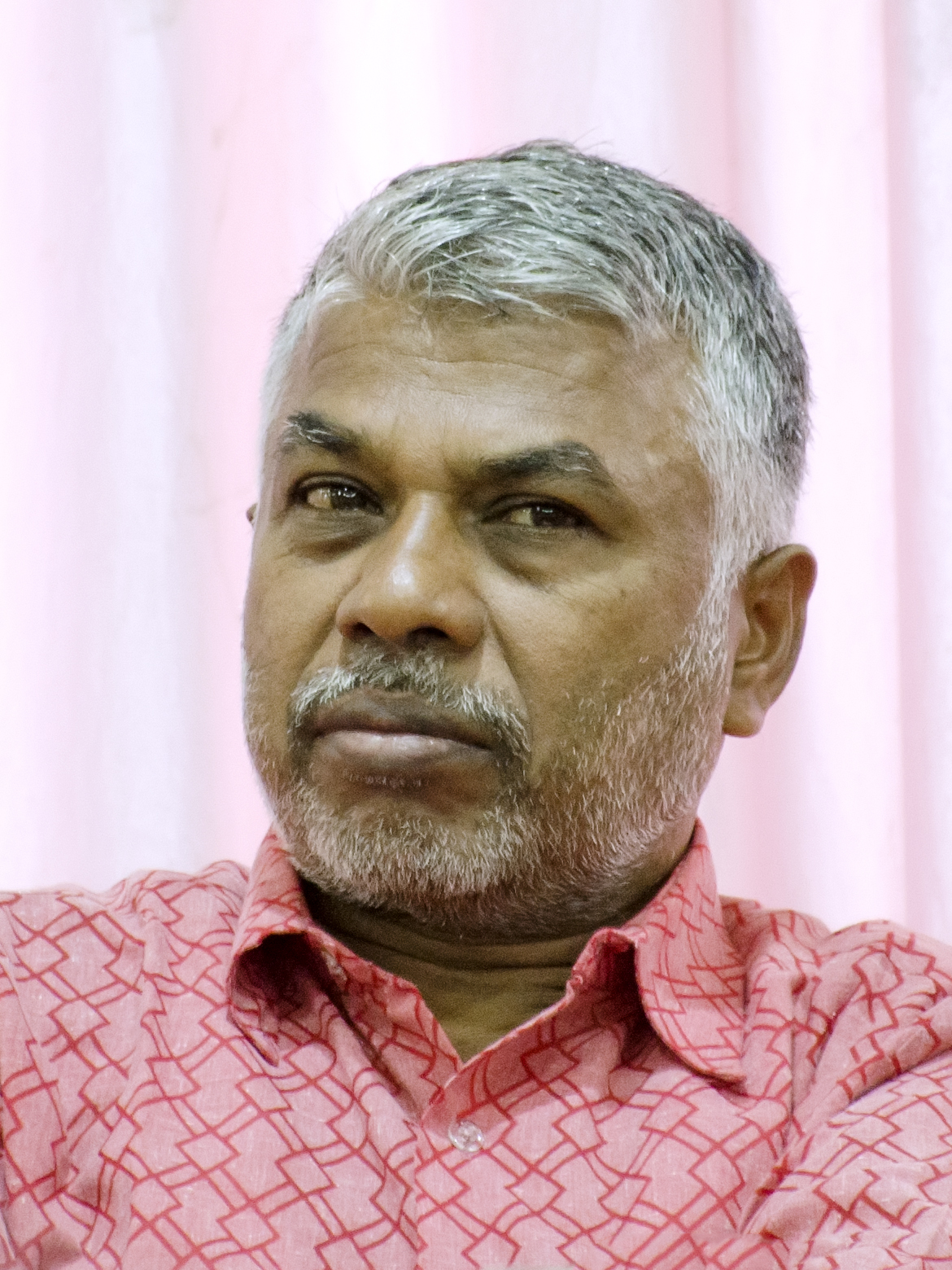
- Born: 15 October 1966 (age 60); Kootapalli, composite Salem district, Madras State (now in Namakkal district, Tamil Nadu), India
- Occupation: Author
- Writing career
- Subject: Tamil
- Notable work: Madhorubagan (novel) Saathiyum Naanum (essays) " Pyre" ( novel)
- Website: perumalmurugan.in

Signature
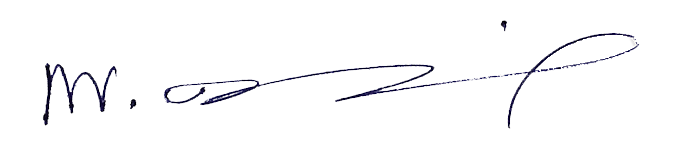

Perumal Murugan (born 1966) is an Indian writer, scholar and literary chronicler who writes in Tamil. He has written twelve novels, six collections of short stories, six anthologies of poetry and many non-fiction books. Ten of his novels have been translated into English: Seasons of the Palm, which was shortlisted for the Kiriyama Prize in 2005, Current Show, One Part Woman, A Lonely Harvest, Trail by Silence, Poonachi or the Story of a Goat, Resolve, Estuary, Rising Heat, and Pyre He was a professor of Tamil at the Government Arts College in Salem Attur and Namakkal.

== Life and education ==
=== Early life ===
Perumal Murugan was born in 1966 to a family of farmers who had small land holdings in Kootapalli near Thiruchengodu, Namakkal district, Tamil Nadu. His father, a farmer, supplemented the family's income by running a soda shop in a cinema theatre in Thiruchengode. Murugan began writing from his early age, and some of his early lyrics of children's songs were featured on programmes broadcast by All India Radio.

=== Education ===
Murugan initially studied Tamil literature both as an undergraduate, in Erode and as a postgraduate in Coimbatore. He went on to obtain an M.Phil. degree from Madras University in Tamil studies, and followed by a Ph.D. His doctoral thesis focused on the works of author R. Shanmugasundaram.

=== Scholarly career ===
As a professor of Tamil literature, Murugan has made several contributions to research and academic study of Tamil literature specific to the Kongunadu region, including building a lexicon of words, idioms and phrases special to Kongunadu. He has also extensively researched and documented Kongu folklore, especially the ballads on Annamar Sami, a pair of folk deities. In addition, Murugan has worked on publishing authoritative editions of classical Tamil texts. He has also republished works of literature relating to the Kongu region. One commentator notes that "In sum, his over 35 books provide a veritable cultural map of the Kongu region." Murugan taught as professor of Tamil at the Government Arts College in Namakkal. but was forced to leave Namakkal following assaults and protests by right-wing Hindu and caste groups, and worked Head of the department of Tamil literature at a government college in Attur, Tamil Nadu. In between, he briefly taught at the Presidency College in Chennai. He Worked as a Principal of Govt. Arts College, Namakkal.

== Literary career and works ==
Murugan is the author of twelve novels, and six collections each of short stories and poems, as well as thirteen books of non-fiction relating to language and literature, in addition to editing several fiction and non-fiction anthologies. Several of his novels have been translated into English, including Seasons of the Palm and Current Show. He has also written a memoir, Nizhal Mutrattu Ninaivugal (2013).

Murugan began his writing career by publishing several short stories in the Tamil journal Manavosai between 1988 and 1991. These stories were later collected and published in a book titled Thiruchengodu (1994). His first novel, Eru Veyyil ('Rising Heat') was published in 1991, and dealt with the problems that a family faced when their land was acquired for the construction of a housing colony, engaging with themes of family, greed, and corruption. His second novel, Nizhal Mutram (1993), translated into English by V Geetha as Current Show (Tara Books, 2004), drew from his personal experience of helping his father run a soda stall in a cinema theatre.

Murugan's third novel, described by the translator and critic N. Kalyan Raman as a 'tour de force' was titled Koolamadari (2000), and was translated by V Geetha as Seasons of the Palm (Tara Books, 2004). The book dealt with the life and travails of its protagonist, Koolaiyan, a young goatherd of the Chakkili (Dalit) caste, who was bonded to work in a Gounder caste family to repay his father's debts. The book dealt with themes of childhood, autonomy, and freedom.

His next novel, Kanganam (Resolve, 2008) dealt with the consequences of sex-selective abortions and female foeticide that caused a skewed sex ratio in the Kongunadu region. It focuses on the protagonist, Marimuthu, unmarried because of the scarcity of women within his caste and society. His novel, Madhurobhagan (2010) translated by Aniruddhan Vasudevan as One Part Woman (Penguin, 2013) dealt with a young childless couple struggling within their marriage, drawing specifically from the community and culture of the Kongunadu region.

One Part Woman is a novel based on a possible ancient cultural practice among people living around Tiruchengode, written by Perumal Murugan. According to historian Romila Thapar, it is the story of a childless couple with a strong desire of having a child, "depicted with admirable sensitivity, anguish and gentleness". Published by Penguin Books, the novel was originally written in Tamil under the name Madhorubagan and then later translated in English by Aniruddhan Vasudevan as One Part Woman. Aniruddhan Vasudevan was awarded Sahitya Akademi Translation Prize (2016) for this book. The book was also included in the longlist for the 2018 National Book Award in the "Translated Literature" category. Recently, his novel Pookkuzhi (Pyre) has been translated to English by Aniruddhan Vasudevan, as well.

His comeback novel (following a brief hiatus following his persecution from right wing forces), Poonachi (The Story Of A Black Goat, 2017) as well as his collection of 10 short stories, Goat Thief, 2017, rooted in rural landscapes were translated by the eminent translator of modern and contemporary Tamil fiction and poetry into English, N Kalyan Raman. Poonachi dealt with the life of a special female goat in the Kongunadu region, focusing on the tragic life of the goat in the hands of a poor old couple. The translation of Poonachi by N Kalyan Raman was awarded the Sahitya Akademi's Translation Prize in 2022. It was also longlisted for the National Book Award (Translated Literature) in 2020, in the US.

In 2017, an anthology of Perumal Murugan's poems, Mayanathil Nitkum Maram (A Tree that Stands in the Crematorium) was published, containing his four previous collections of poetry: Nigazh Uravu, Gomuki Nadhikarai Koozhaangal, Neer Midakkum Kanngal and Velli Shani Bhudhan Nyayaru Vzhyayan Chevvai.

In June 2018, Murugan announced that he was working on a new novel, which examined middle-class families and their relationship with new technology. This novel, titled Kazhimugam (Estuary) was translated by Nandini Krishnan to English and published in 2020.

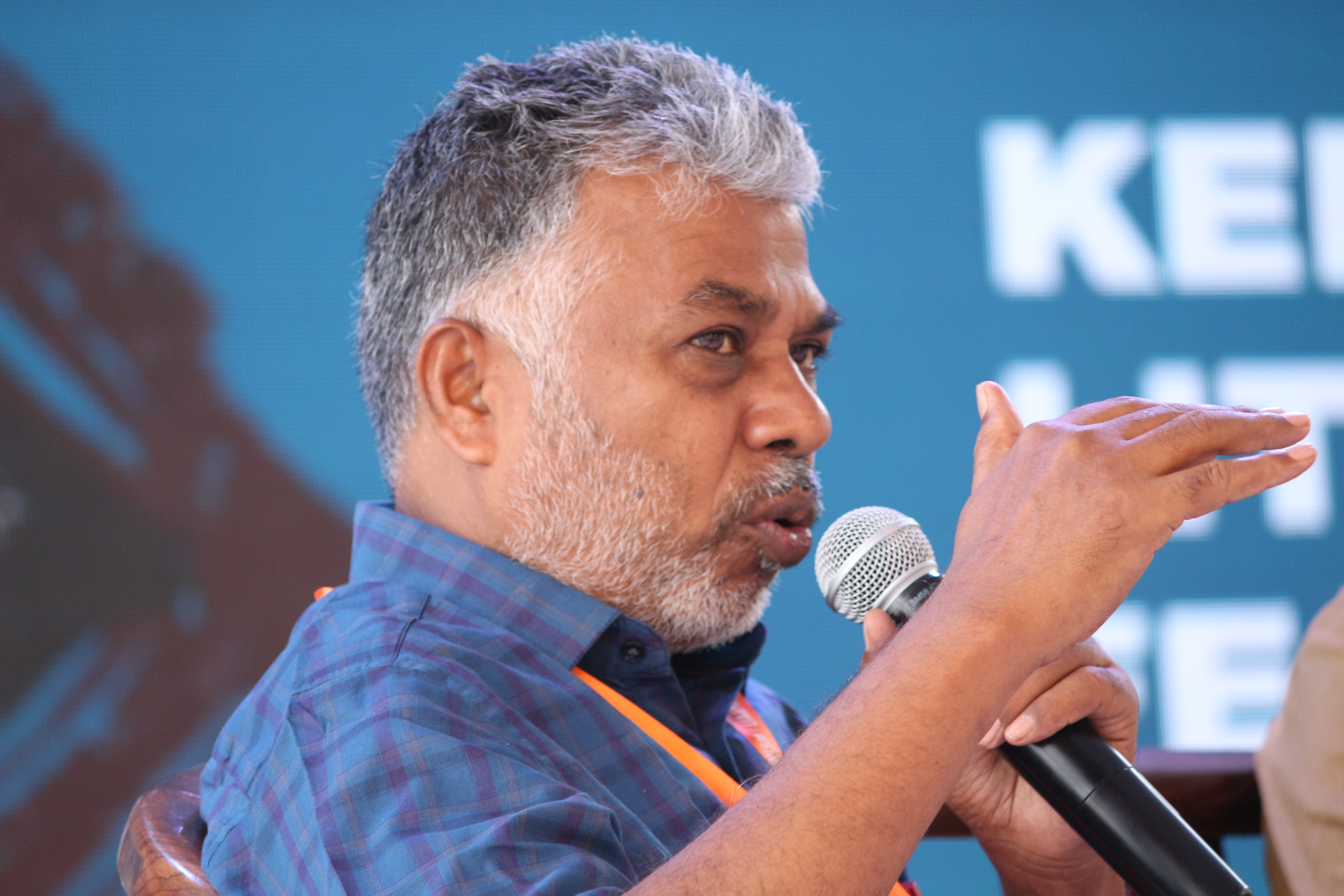
At KLF in 2018

== Controversy ==
Murugan's fifth novel Madhorubhagan (translated as 'One Part Woman') was set in his native town of Thiruchengode, and dealt with a couple, Kali and Ponna, who were the subject of social stigma and humiliation for their inability to have a child. The novel portrays their eventual participation in a chariot festival to honour the god Ardhanareeshwara, during which, for one night every year, the local community in the novel relaxed taboos and allowed free relations between men and women. The novel was published in 2010 and was well-received, but began to attract controversy in 2014 after local caste-based and religious Hindu groups objected to the fictional portrayal of traditions at the Ardhanareeswarar Temple in Tiruchengode, where the eponymous presiding deity is part-Shiva and part-Parvati in one idol. He had further received grants from the Tata Foundation and India Foundation for the Arts headed by Anmol Vellani. The Tamil title of the book, Madhorubagan, is a translation of the name of the deity (Ardha-naree-eswarar), just as the English title, One Part Woman, is an allusion to the deity's form. The protest by some outfits were continued by the local units even after they lost momentum at the state level.

Protests were eventually called off after the local police summoned the protesters and Murugan for a 'peace talk' and compelled him to sign an “unconditional apology” and withdraw all copies of the novel. Murugan in January 2015 announced that he was giving up writing, and said on his Facebook page that "Perumal Murugan the writer is dead. As he is no God, he is not going to resurrect himself. He also has no faith in rebirth. An ordinary teacher, he will live as P. Murugan. Leave him alone."

A series of litigation and suits concerning One Part Woman were instituted before the Madras High Court, and on 5 July 2016 the Madras High Court dismissed the case under citing Article 19(1)(a) of the Constitution of India, ruled that there was no binding force or obligation in the previous state intervention that forced him to apologise and withdraw the books. The court further directed the state to provide appropriate protection when artistic or literary people come under attack, and to form an expert body to help guide the police and local administration to develop sensitivity to the issues involved. Following this judgment, Murugan returned to his literary career with a collection of poetry. This would become Songs of a Coward, Poems of Exile (in Tamil, Kozhaiyin Paadalgal) which chronicles his tormented journey in and out of exile from January 2015 to July 2016.

In 2021, Murugan's picture was included in a political banner created by the Bharatiya Janata Party, in which he along with several other persons were depicted as residents of a local slum. A spokesperson from the BJP apologized for the inclusion; however, Murugan stated "“I myself belong to slums, so I am delighted. I am happy to have featured along with them."

== Bibliography ==
Novels:

- Eru Veyyil (1991)
- Nizhal Mutram (1993)
- Koolamadari (2000)
- Kanganam (2008)
- Maadhorubhaagan (2010)
- Aalandaapatchi (2012)
- Pūkkul̲i (2013)
- Arthanaari (2014)
- Aalavaayan (2014)
- Poonachi: Or the Story of a Black Goat (2016)
- Kazhimugam (2018)
- Neduneram (2022)

Short Story collections:

- Thiruchengodu (1994)
- Neer Vilaiyattu (2000)
- Peekkathaikal (2006)
- Veppennaik Kalayam (2012)
- Perumal murugan short stories (2016)
- Mayam (2020)

Poetry collections:

- Nihaluravu (1992)
- Komugi Nathikkarai Koozhankal(2000)
- Neer Mithakkum Kankal (2005)
- Velli sani pudan ngayiru viyazhan sevvai (2012)
- Kozhaiyin Padalkal (2016)
- Mayanathil Nitkum Maram (2016)

Dictionary:

- Kongu Vattara Chollagarathi (2000)

Research and Criticism

- R.Shanmugasundaraththin Padaippalumai (2000)
- Thuyaramum Thuyara Nimiththamum (2004)
- Pathippugal Maruppathippugal (2011)
- Ketta Varththai Pesuvom (2011)

Essay collections:

- Kariththal Theriyavillaiya Thampi (2007)
- Vaan Kuriviyin Koodu (2012)
- Nizhalmuttraththu Ninaivukal (2012)
- Sagayam Seitha Sagayam (2014)
- Nilamum Nilamum (2018)
- Thonraththunai (2019)
- Manathi Nirkum Manavarkal (2021)
- Mayirthan Pirachchinaiya? (2022)

Interview :

- Maraathu Enru Ethuvummillai (Bezavada Wilson) (2022)

Edited Works:

- Kongu Nadu (T.A. Muthusamy Konar) 2005))
- Paravaikalum Vedanthankalum (M. Krishnan) (2009)
- Ku.Pa.Ra. Sirukathaikal (2014)
- Karuvalaiyum Kaiyum (Ku.Pa.Ra. kavithaikal) (2022)

Collected Works:

== Awards and prizes ==
- In 2005, Perumal Murugan's novel Seasons of the Palm was shortlisted for the Kiriyama Prize.
- In 2017, the English translation of Murugan's novel Madhorubhagan, or One Part Woman, by Aniruddhan Vasudevan, won the Sahitya Akademi's Translation Prize.
- In 2022, the English translation of Poonachi by N Kalyan Raman won the Sahitya Akademi’s Translation Prize.
- In 2022, he got the "Fakir Mohan National Literary Award', from Fakir Mohan University, Odisa.
- In 2023, the English translation of Murugan's novel "Pūkkul̲i", or "Pyre", by Aniruddhan Vasudevan, has been longlisted for the International Booker Prize 2023
- In 2023, his novel ‘Fire Bird’ has won the JCB Prize
