= Yang Shuang-zi =

Taiwanese writer (born 1984)

- 楊双子
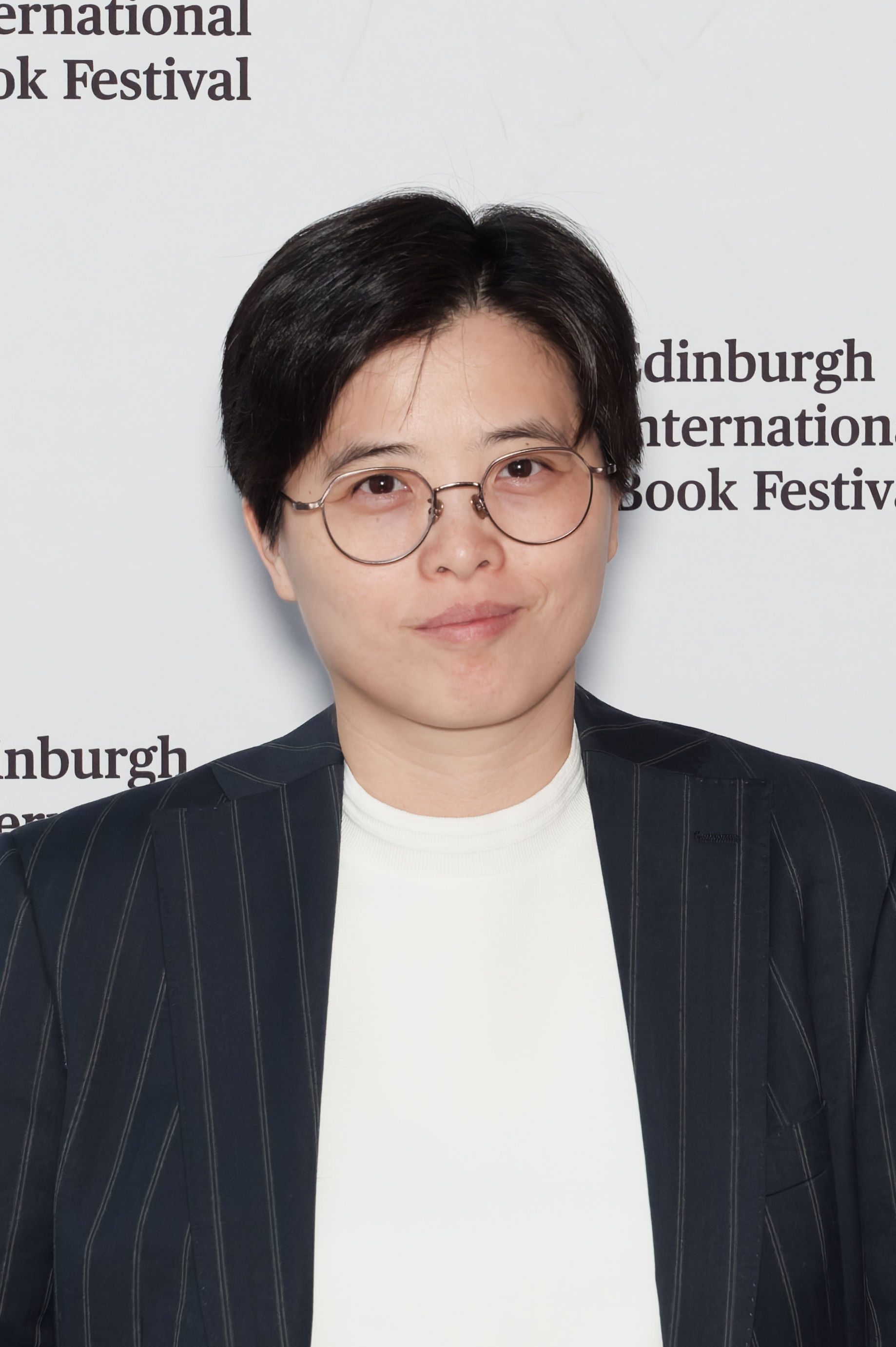
- Yang in 2026
- Born: Yang Jo-tzu (楊若慈); July 10, 1984 (age 42); Wuri, Taichung County, Taiwan
- Education: National Chung Hsing University (BA, MA)
- Notable work: Taiwan Travelogue (2020)
- Awards: Golden Tripod Award (2020); Best Translation Award (2024); National Book Award for Translated Literature (2024); International Booker Prize (2026)

Chinese name
- Traditional Chinese: 楊双子
- Simplified Chinese: 杨双子
Transcriptions
Standard Mandarin
- Hanyu Pinyin: Yáng Shuāngzǐ
- IPA: [jǎŋ ʂwáŋ.tsɹ̩̀]

Yang Shuang-zi (simplified Chinese: 杨双子; traditional Chinese: 楊双子; pinyin: Yáng Shuāngzǐ; born Yang Jo-tzu; simplified Chinese: 杨若慈; traditional Chinese: 楊若慈; pinyin: Yáng Ruòcí; born 10 July 1984) is a Taiwanese writer. Her novel Taiwan Travelogue (2020), translated into English by Lin King, won the 2024 National Book Award for Translated Literature and the 2026 International Booker Prize.

== Name ==
Yang was born "Yang Jo-tzu", the elder of twin sisters alongside Yang Jo-hui (杨若晖; 楊若暉; Yáng Ruòhuī). Jo-tzu grew up interested in literature, while Jo-hui was more interested in history and translation. In 2014, the twins decided to collaborate on historical fiction under the shared pen name Yang Shuang-zi, meaning "twins", with Jo-hui primarily responsible for historical research and Jo-tzu for narrative and plot. Jo-hui was diagnosed with stage three breast cancer in 2009 and died in 2015. Jo-tzu continued writing under the pen name in her sister's memory. Jo-tzu attributed her sister's illness to years of chronic overwork dating back to their difficult upbringing.

The character shuang in the pen name is written as the Japanese kanji 双, which is identical to the simplified Chinese form, rather than the traditional Chinese 雙, in acknowledgement of Jo-hui's deep interest in Japanese history.

== Early life and education ==
Yang and her twin sister were born in a military dependents' village in Wuri, Taichung, on 10 July 1984. After their parents divorced when they were five, their mother remarried; they lived with their father and grandparents. The sisters were primarily cared for by their illiterate grandmother and their father's girlfriend. When they were fourteen, their grandmother died and their father left the family, leaving them debtors, with an uncle with gambling and drug addictions as their sole caretaker, rendering the twins effectively without guardianship. From the age of fifteen, both sisters worked part-time to support themselves. Jo-tzu worked at a fried chicken cutlet shop and a bakery, and Jo-hui at an educational materials company.

Yang spent eight years in night school—three years in the business program at the vocational high school affiliated to Taichung Institute of Technology (now National Taichung University of Science and Technology), followed by five years in a continuing education bachelor's degree program in Chinese language and literature at National Chung Hsing University (NCHU). Throughout those eight years she worked during the day and wrote fiction. She completed her undergraduate degree in 2008 and was admitted for graduate studies in literature at National Cheng Kung University, but withdrew before completing the program. The following year, she enrolled in the Graduate Institute of Taiwan Literature and Transnational Cultural Studies at NCHU. She graduated in 2012 with a thesis on Taiwanese popular romance fiction under the supervision of Kuo-wei Chen.

In her early years, Yang identified with a pan-blue, unificationist outlook. She developed an interest in the Chinese classics as a teenager, particularly the Analects, which led her to study Chinese in college. Her political identity shifted through two student movements. In 2008, shortly after her undergraduate graduation, the Wild Strawberry Movement occurred. During the demonstrations, Taiwanese police suppressed displays of the flag of the Republic of China, which unsettled Yang and motivated her to study Taiwanese literature in graduate school. In 2014, by which point she had leaned toward Taiwanese independence, the Sunflower Student Movement, sparked by the Cross-Strait Service Trade Agreement (CSSTA), made Yang realize that "Taiwan has been facing threats from China" and motivated her to "write something for Taiwan from a perspective only I can see."

== Career ==
From around the age of ten, amid the 1990s wave of Taiwanese comics, Yang intended to become a manga artist. When the local comics industry contracted before it could fully develop, she pivoted at fourteen to writing fiction instead. She began her career as a genre writer in the vein of local popular romance fiction, submitting widely before her first romance novel, Aiqing Dahunzhan (爱情大混战; 愛情大混戰; Àiqíng Dà Hùnzhàn), was published in early 2003 when she was nineteen. In 2005, after publishing four romance novels, she received two consecutive rejections and withdrew to reassess, shifting toward literary fiction and became known for her historical yuri fiction. Yang, with her sister, has also been active in ACG subculture as both a fan and a creator. In 2009, the sisters co-founded a doujinshi society Mao Pin (猫品; 貓品; Māo Pǐn) and jointly published a doujinshi based on Maria Watches Over Us (Marimite).

In 2017, Yang drew notice with her yuri novel Seasons Of Bloom (花开时节; 花開時節; Huā Kāi Shí Jié), in which a modern-day protagonist travels back in time to the 1926 Taiwan. In 2020, her breakthrough novel Taiwan Travelogue was published by Springhill Publishing. It follows Aoyama Chizuko, a Japanese writer who visits Taiwan in 1938, when the island is under Japanese colonial rule, and gradually falls in love with her Taiwanese interpreter and travel companion. Each chapter is themed around a different Taiwanese dish.

=== Taiwan Travelogue ===
Taiwan Travelogue received Taiwan's 2021 Golden Tripod Award. The Japanese version was published by Chuokoron-Shinsha in 2023 and won Japan's Best Translation Award in 2024. The English version, translated by Lin King, was published by Graywolf Press in the US in 2024 and by And Other Stories in the UK in 2026. It won the 2024 National Book Award for Translated Literature, the 2025 Baifang Schell Book Prize Award for Outstanding Translated Literature from Chinese Language, and the 2026 International Booker Prize. Natasha Brown, the chair of the Booker Prize jury, said the novel "pulls off an incredible double feat: It succeeds as both a romance and an incisive post-colonial novel." As of May 2026, translation rights to the book have been secured in 22 languages.

Kirkus Reviews called the novel a "moving account of friendship in the shadow of the Japanese Southern Expansion policy". Publishers Weekly stated "Yáng offers rich reflections on colonialism and translation along with delightful depictions of Taiwanese delicacies". The Financial Times wrote that "Taiwan Travelogue is a multi-layered meditation on language and longing, and on the many ways in which we travel only to arrive where we started". Shi Shi wrote in Whynot, an outlet of Radio Free Asia, that in confronting Taiwan's history of Japanese colonial rule, Yang "offered an unconventional answer, and in doing so fulfilled her aspiration of 'liberating women through yuri fiction'".

Christopher Shrimpton reviewed in the Times Literary Supplement that, despite being a "pleasant, well-intentioned novel", Taiwan Travelogue suffers from a thin and inconsequential story, "the central relationship is diffused by a trundling narrative and a fondness for lists [...] and never approaches anything like romantic tension." He noted that "a distractingly cartoonish tone (the author also writes manga), not helped by Lin King's often awkward translation, softens the edges even more".

== Personal life ==
Yang is married to Lai Ting-ho (Rose), a fashion influencer and writer.

== Books ==
- Taiwan Travelogue
- Seasons of Bloom
- A Foodie's Guide to Old Taichung
- Nº. 1, Siwei Street
