= Planeta.ru =

Russian crowdfunding platform

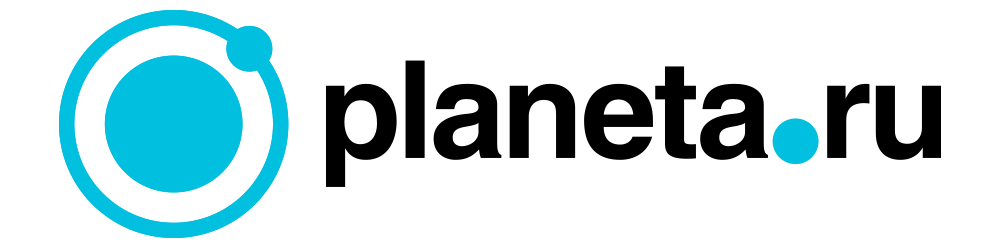
- Website type: Crowdfunding
- Available in: Russian
- Website: planeta.ru
- Commercial: Yes
- Registration: Required
- Users: Over 20000 visitors daily
- Launched: 7 June 2012; 14 years ago
- Current status: Active

Planeta.ru is a Russian crowdfunding platform, one of the first and currently the biggest in the country. It allows to fund creative, scientific, social, entrepreneurial and other projects by raising money from a large number of individuals. From its founding in June 2012 until February 2019 over 4500 projects totaling billion rubles were funded.

The site is similar to English-language sites such as Kickstarter and IndieGoGo.

== History ==
Planeta.ru was founded on 7 June 2012 by three friends - Max Lakmus (bass player from the Bi-2 music band), Fedor Murachkovskiy and Vasily Andruschenko. In the beginning it was envisaged as a service for the music bands albums pre-orders. However, in the process of launching and development Planeta.ru became a crowdfunding platform. Planeta.ru foundation day is considered as a Day of Crowdfunding in Russia.

During the Russian Internet Week - 2013, Planeta.ru organized the first professional conference dedicated to the crowdfunding and crowdinvesting.

There was a charity program "MegaFon helps" on Planeta.ru from 2015 to 2017. Mobile phone operator increased each contribution in certain projects dedicated to several topics: rehabilitation of children with disabilities, social and professional adaptation young people with disabilities and others Also in 2015 the program GOODSTARTER for social entrepreneurs was realized in cooperation with Lipton brand.

In 2016 the platform became one of the initiators of the open-ended project "Bibliorodina" where anybody could finance the scientific publications subscriptions as a gift for one of the Russian libraries.

Reality-show "The battle of technologies" was realized in February 2017 in collaboration with Russian Venture Company and Eva Invest fund. The aim of the project was in selecting 10 best technological start-ups that wanted to raise money by crowdfunding and educating them how to do it properly.

In addition to crowdfunding, Planeta.ru also develops its online-shop.

=== Crowdfunding school ===
In 2015 the experts of Planeta.ru started to organize offline and online educational activities in order to explain how to prepare for the launch of the crowdfunding campaign and run it successfully. These activities have already been undertaken in Siberia, Ural region, Kaliningrad and Volga federal region. 12000 people became students of the Crowdfunding school by March 2017. In October 2017 Planeta.ru launched an online educational course "Crowdfunding in 60 minutes" with short videos explaining the stages of crowdfunding campaign creation.

== See also ==
- Comparison of crowd funding services
