= Susan Daniel (translator) =

Indian translator

- Born: Kerala
- Education: University of Mysore
- Occupation: Translator
- Writing career
- Notable awards: Sahitya Akademi Translation Prize (2019)

Susan Daniel is a Kerala born academic and Kannada-English translator who is settled now in Ooty, Tamil Nadu. For her English translation of Devanura Mahadeva's Kannada novel Kusumabale, she received many awards including the Karnataka Government's Kuvempu Bhasha Bharathi award for best translator and the Sahitya Akademi Translation Prize for the year 2019.

== Early life and education ==
Susan Daniel was born in Kerala and brought up in Karnataka. She studied literature from the University of Mysore.

Although her mother tongue is Malayalam, she studied Kannada and English as a subject from school to college, and Tamil by listening.

== Career ==
She served as a teacher/academician at the University of Mysore, working as a professor of English literature.

While in Tamil Nadu, Daniel ran a press and edited a news magazine for the Nilgiris district, and also edited a translation magazine called Anuvada. She represented the Nilgiris at the 2007 South Asian Association for Regional Cooperation's International Folklore Conference and the International Trade Fair Conference.

Daniel translated Devenoora Mahadeva's critically acclaimed classic Kannada novel Kusumabale into English. The translated version of the novel was released by Oxford University Press in 2015.

== Retirement ==
She settled in Ooty, her husband's hometown, after her retirement.

After retirement, Daniel was involved in cross-cultural studies for students from the US, entrepreneurial activities related to education in the Nilgiris district, and a project to teach communication skills through drama to underprivileged children in Ooty.

== Awards and honors ==
In 2015, Susan Daniel received the Karnataka Government's Kuvempu Bhasha Bharathi award for best translator for her English translation of Devanura Mahadeva's novel Kusumabale from Kannada to English. Susan Daniel has been awarded the 2019 Sahitya Akademi Translation Prize for her translation into English of Kusumabale. She also received many other awards including the Women's Day Award, Nilgiris 2020, and Bharatiya Vidya Bhavan Award 2021.
