= Laura Secor =

American journalist

- Education: Brown University (BA)
- Occupation: Journalist
- Known for: Iran coverage

Laura Secor is an American journalist whose work has focused on Iranian politics and Iran–United States relations. She has written about personal stories, such as the experience of poet Asieh Amini, and has also written a book, Children of Paradise: The Struggle for the Soul of Iran.

== Education and career ==
Secor earned a B.A. in philosophy at Brown University before beginning to cover Iran. After visiting Iran in 2004 she was struck by the vocal dissent there of the people against their government. She began to write about the reform movement there and individuals struggling for change. She also writes about the Iranian diaspora in the US and has documented the case of Sirous Asgari.

== Bibliography ==
=== Books ===
- Children of Paradise: the struggle for the soul of Iran

=== Essays and reporting ===
- Secor, Laura (September 21, 2020). "The man who wouldn't spy : the F.B.I. tried to recruit an Iranian scientist as an informant". A Reporter at Large. The New Yorker. 96 (28): 32–43. (Note: About Sirous Asgari. Online version is titled "The man who refused to spy".)

———————
