= Oxfam Novib/PEN Award =

Literary award

Oxfam Novib/PEN Award for Freedom of Expression is a literary award made in collaboration with PEN International Writers in Prison Committee, the PEN Emergency Fund, and Oxfam Novib (the Dutch affiliate of the international Oxfam organization). The award is to recognize writers who have been persecuted for their work and continue working despite the consequences. Honorees receive €2,500.

The award is one of many PEN awards sponsored by International PEN affiliates in over 145 PEN centres around the world.

== Honorees ==
- 2005
  - Sihem Bensedrine (Tunisia), journalist and human rights activist
  - Neziha Rejiba (Tunisia), journalist and editor
  - Sarah Mkhonza (Swaziland), novelist and columnist
  - Claudia Anthony (Sierra Leone), journalist
  - Dương Thu Hương (Vietnam), novelist
- 2006
  - Simon Mol (Poland), journalist
  - Andrej Dyńko (Belarus)
  - Roya Toloui (Iran/Kurdistan)
  - Faraj Bayrakdar (Syria)
  - Hrant Dink (Turkey)
- 2007
  - Fatou Jaw-Manneh (Gambia), journalist
  - Svetlana Alexievich (Belarus), writer
  - Lydia Cacho Ribeiro (Mexico), writer
  - Ekbal Baraka (Egypt)
- 2008
  - Dejan Anastasijevic (Serbia), journalist
  - Pierre Roger Lambo Sanjo (Cameroon), writer
  - Christopher Mlalazi and Raisedon Baya (Zimbabwe), playwrights
  - Maung Thura and Saw Wei (Burma), poets
- 2009
  - Chi Dang (Vietnam), writer
  - Maziar Bahari (Iranian-Canadian), journalist
  - Irakli Kakabadze (Georgia), writer
  - Sonali Samarasinghe Wickrematunge (Sri Lanka), journalist
  - Daniel Coronell (Colombia), columnist
- 2010 [no award]
- 2011
  - Andrei Nekrasov (Russia), film and journalist
  - Sakit Zahidov (Azerbaijan), journalist and poet
  - Nedim Şener (Turkey), journalist
  - J.S. Tissainayagam (Sri Lanka), journalist
- 2012
  - Asieh Amini (Iran), journalist, blogger and activist
  - Jesús Lemus Barajas (Mexico), journalist and writer
  - Mikhail Bekhetof (Russia), journalist
  - Rachid Nini (Morocco), newspaper editor
  - Alhaj Warrag and Abdul Moniem Suleman (Sudan), newspaper founder/editor; and columnist (respectively)
- 2013
  - Samar Yazbek (Syria), writer and journalist
  - Enoh Meyomesse (Cameroon) Writer, activist
  - Nargess Mohammadi (Iran), journalist activist
  - Deo Namujimbo (Congo), journalist
  - Büşra Ersanlı (Turkey), writer, academic
- 2014
  - Abdiaziz Abdinur Ibrahim (Somalia), freelance journalist
  - Oksana Chelysheva (Russia), journalist, activist
  - Dina Meza (Honduras), journalist, activist
- 2015
  - Bahman Ahmadi-Amouee and Jila Baniyaghoob (Iran), journalists
  - Razan Naiem Almoghrabi (Libya), writer, journalist, and advocate of women's rights
  - Abdelmoneim Rahama (Sudan), poet, writer and journalist
- 2016
  - Amanuel Asrat (Eritrea), poet, writer and editor-in-chief
  - Can Dündar (Turkey), writer and journalist
  - Omar Hazek (Egypt), poet and writer
- 2017
  - Ashraf Fayadh (Saudi Arabia), imprisoned poet
  - Malini Subramaniam (India), journalist
- 2018
  - Eskinder Nega (Ethiopian), journalist
  - Milagros Socorro (Venezuelan), journalist
- 2019
  - Dareen Tatour (Palestinian), poet
  - Gioconda Belli (Nicaraguan), author
  - Roberto Saviano (Italian), journalist
- 2020
  - Stella Nyanzi (Ugandan), academic, writer and feminist activist.
- 2021
  - Tsitsi Dangarembga (Zimbabwean), author
