= Suburban Girl MedER =

- Genre: Medical drama
- Created by: Davit Gogichaishvili
- Based on: Grey's Anatomy
- Developed by: 1
- Written by: Irakli Kakabadze; Nika Tsulukidze; Eka Elieshvili; Keti Elieshvili
- Directed by: Davit Chabashvili
- Starring: Mari Bolkvadze; Tornike Gogrichiani; Zura Tsintskiladze; Ruska Makashvili
- Theme music composer: Giga Mikaberidze
- Composer: Giga Mikaberidze
- Country of origin: Georgia
- Original language: Georgian
- No. of seasons: 2
- No. of episodes: 25

Production
- Executive producer: Irakli Kakabadze
- News editors: Vakho Kakauridze; Ilia Iakobadze
- Production location: Tbilisi

Original release
- Network: Imedi TV
- Release: February 17 – September 21, 2012

Suburban Girl MedER is a Georgian medical drama series, which was shot by Night Show Studio in 2012. The series is a continuation of a soap opera of the same name Suburban Girl . Producers had decided to didn't continue the storyline and the end of season 5 series is over, but the show's success prompted to continue. The series is not the original, it's based on the popular American medical drama Grey's Anatomy.

== Story ==
The story develops in medical hospital called MedER, the owner is a popular businessman called Archil Tsilosani who is in coma, his son, Nika Gegelidze is waiting for the day of his father's health improvement. The hospital has a new training program for the doctors, which leads to the teaching practice in the medical field, one of the contestants is Keta, a girl who develops in the series. Keta recently came in Tbilisi, trying to leave the past problems and start a new life. In the bar, she accidentally meets one guy, with whom she spends one night, but fate has a laugh for her and this guy turns out to be the hospital's main doctor and also head of the trainers, and has just started to work.

== Filming locations and technique ==
Night Show Studio for series specifically preparing a decoration's and shooting was pending different pavilions

=== Main characters ===
Actor	Character	Description
Mari Bolkvadze	Keta Kacharava	"MedER" Intern's doctor
Tornike Gogrichiani	Nika Gegelidze	Archil Tsilosani's son
Zura Tsintskiladze	Archil Tsilosani	"MedER" owner
Ruska Makashvili	Ancho	
Keta Lortkipanidze	Mari Kereselidze	"MedER" administrator
Lasha Jukharashvili	Sandro Kandelaki	"MedER" main doctor, the head of the trainers
Khatia Brachuli	Marika Oragvelidze	"MedER" Intern's doctor Medical University 4-year student
Giorgi Gagloev	Zuriko Machavariani	"MedER" Intern's doctor
Keti Gegeshidze	Tamar Shervashidze	"MedER" doctor's home
Salome Ninua	Tatuka	Keta's half-sister
Nanuka Litanishvili	Nina	Tatuka's mother and Keta's stepmother
Ana Aladashvili	Lela	"MedER" nurse
Elene Zaldastanishvili	Nutsa	Lela's daughter
Giorgi Bochorishvili	Levan	Emergency call driver
Eka Demetradze		"MedER" nurse

== Episode Role ==
- Goga Chkheidze - Giorgi Vachnadze - Resident doctor
- Nuka Margvelashvili - Nanka, Tatukas Friend # 1
- Natia Tsitsilashvili - Anka, Tatukas Friend # 2
- Lali Badurashvili - Liana from the bank
- Davit Velijanashvili
- Giorgi Kapanadze
- Irma Berianidze - Nina's Friend # 1
- Nino Tarkhan-Mouravi - Nina's Friend # 2
