= Controversies surrounding Hassan Sheikh Mohamud =

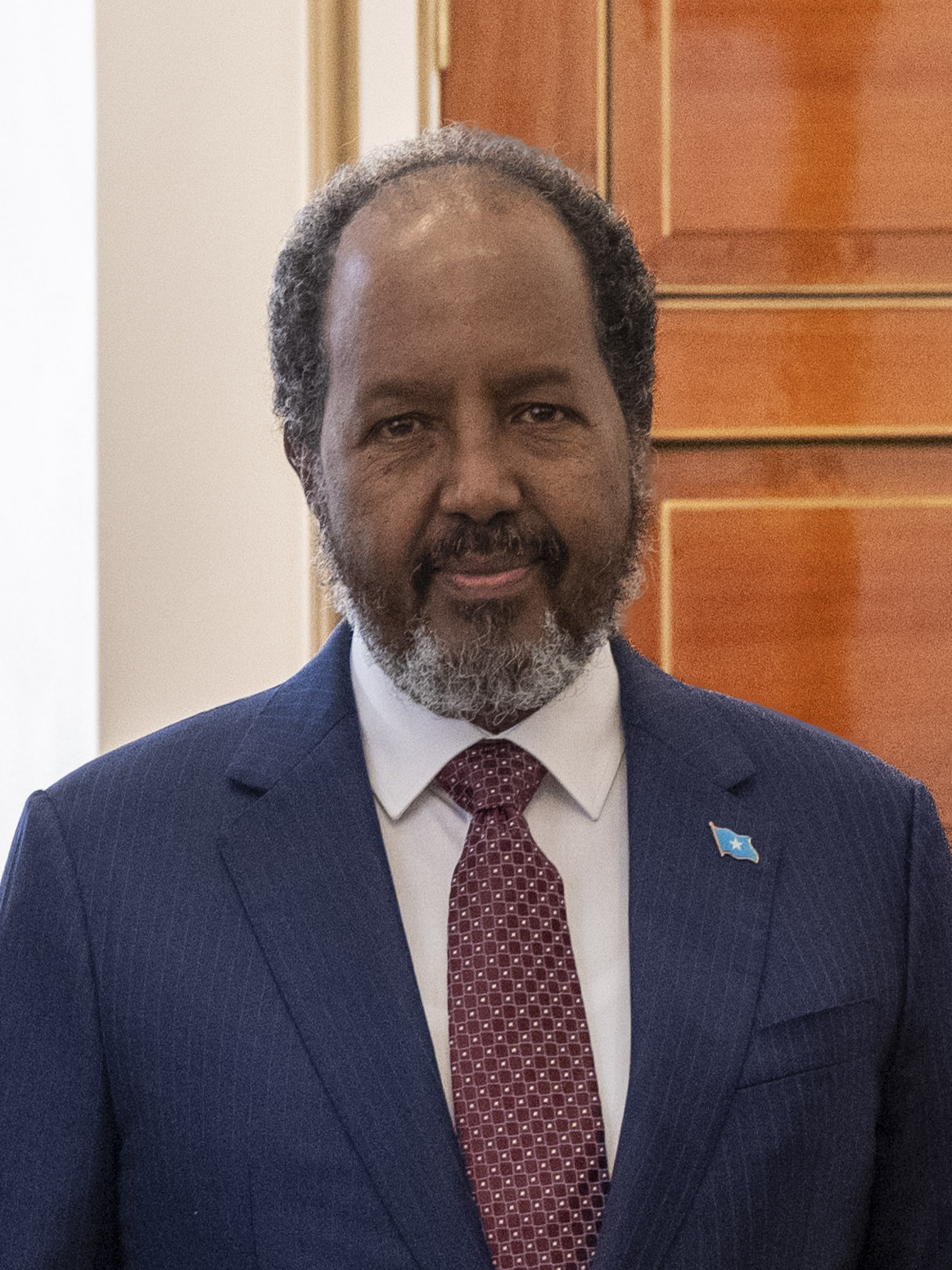
Hassan Sheikh Mohamud

Hassan Sheikh Mohamud, who has served as the 8th president of Somalia following his indirect election victory in May 2022 and previously served from 2012 to 2017, has faced numerous controversies during his political career. These controversies have spanned allegations of corruption, nepotism, attempts at impeachment, no-confidence motions, and criticism over security failures, alongside other governance-related disputes.

During 2014 he controversially welcomed the entry of Ethiopian troops into the African Union mission in the wake of the 2006 invasion. His first administration faced serious criticism for rampant corruption, media restrictions and abuse of power.

== Alleged corruption ==
One of the most persistent controversies surrounding was involves allegations of corruption, particularly during his first term as presidency. UN monitors have accused his administration of mismanaging public funds and engaging in schemes to divert Somalia's scarce resources, a charge that gained international attention through investigative reports.

=== Corruption ===
His first administration that operated from 2012 to 2017 faced serious criticism for rampant corruption, media restrictions and abuse of power. The United Nations Monitoring Group accused the administration of arming al-Shabab. A 2013 report alleged a conspiracy between President Mohamoud and a US law firm to steal public funds. He failed to address the rampant corruption during his first term as President of Somalia.

=== Nepotism ===
In March 2023, President Mohamoud appointed his daughter Jehan Hassan Sheikh Mohamoud as his international affairs advisor. This move, unprecedented in post-1991 Somalia, sparked widespread discussion and controversy across social media platforms. The appointment resulted in a rare resignation from a high-ranking Somali official. Following the 32nd Arab League Summit, which marked Syria's reinstatement after a decade-long suspension, Somalia's ambassador to Saudi Arabia, Salim Ma'ow Haji, resigned from his position. Haji cited insults and violations of diplomatic norms by the President's inner circle, notably led by his cousin, Hinda Culusow, alleging that they had obstructed his participation in the summit. While Ambassador Haji found himself excluded from the summit hall, Jehan Mohamoud was prominently present alongside her father. In response to inquiries regarding his daughter's prominent governmental role and her perceived lack of experience, Mohamoud defended the appointment by asserting that his children and relatives are "citizens just like everyone else."

=== Son's traffic accident ===
On 30 November 2023, the son of the president, Mohamed Hassan Sheikh, killed a Turkish citizen Yunus Emre Göçer while riding a motorcycle in an accident in Istanbul, Turkey. Mohamed caused the accident while driving a vehicle belonging to the Somali Embassy in Ankara. The Turkish police later took him into custody. The victim, a motor courier, died on 6 December 2023. The vehicle belonged to the Somalian embassy and donned diplomatic plates, although the son was not directly connected with the embassy. Although the court initially imposed a two-and-a-half-year prison sentence, it was later commuted to a fine. This decision was influenced, in part, by the remorse demonstrated by the individual during the trial. Additionally, he was prohibited from driving for a period of six months.

=== Corruption tackle committee ===
On 11 July 2023, Horn Observer published a critical document for President Hassan Sheikh Mohamud who faced criticism for not adhering to his own stance on combating corruption. Despite publicly denouncing corrupt officials as a "contagious disease" and urging the public to distance themselves from such individuals, they allgeged president has failed him self to take action against his close allies implicated in a financial scandal.

A key case involves the Ministry of Finance, where US$400,000 intended for the president's canceled trip to London remains unaccounted for. The funds were allegedly taken by State Minister for Presidency Abshir Bukhaari, a close ally of the president, who has not provided any clarification despite repeated requests.

This issue, which surfaced just before the president's trip to the U.S., is compounded by reports of financial mismanagement involving other associates of President Mohamud. The Prime Minister's recent dismissal of Finance Minister Dr. Elmi Mohamud Nur, who had suspended two of the president's associates over corruption. Transparency regarding the president's office budget allocation of over US$11 million remains a matter of contention, with little accountability in how these funds are used.

=== UN monitors' allegations (2014) ===
In July 2014, Reuters reported on a confidential United Nations Monitoring Group report alleging a conspiracy within Mohamud's administration to divert Somali assets recovered from overseas. The report claimed that funds and assets, frozen during Somalia's decades of civil war and held in foreign accounts, were being misappropriated through a scheme involving senior officials and a U.S.-based law firm, Shulman Rogers. According to the Organized Crime and Corruption Reporting Project, the UN monitors "systematic diversion" of these assets, intended to rebuild Somalia's shattered economy, into the hands of politically connected individuals. The report suggested that Mohamud's inner circle, including advisors and allies, benefited from contracts and payments that lacked transparency which raising questions about his oversight and potential complicity in the scheme.

The allegations centered on a deal with Shulman Rogers to recover Somalia's overseas assets, estimated to be worth millions of dollars. The UN report criticized the lack of competitive bidding for the contract and noted that a significant portion of the recovered funds appeared to vanish into opaque channels. Mohamud's government denied the accusations, asserting that the asset recovery process was legitimate and aimed at bolstering national coffers. However, the absence of detailed financial records and the refusal to fully cooperate with UN inquiries fueled skepticism among Somalia's opposition and international donors.

=== Public reaction and aftermath ===
The 2014 allegations eroded trust in Mohamud's leadership, particularly as Somalia relied heavily on foreign aid to fund governance and security operations. Opposition figures, such as former Prime Minister Abdiweli Sheikh Ahmed, accused Mohamud of prioritizing personal gain over national reconstruction. The controversy contributed to perceptions of systemic corruption within the Federal Government of Somalia (FGS), with critics arguing that Mohamud failed to implement promised anti-corruption reforms. During his second term (2022–present), these earlier accusations resurfaced, with detractors claiming that little had changed in his approach to financial accountability.

=== Second term scrutiny ===
Since returning to power in 2022, Mohamud has faced renewed allegations of corruption tied to military contracts and humanitarian aid distribution. Reports from Somali media and diaspora outlets have suggested that funds earmarked for the offensive against Al-Shabaab were diverted to loyalists or misused in patronage networks. While no definitive evidence has been presented as of March 2025 to match the scale of the 2014 UN report, the persistence of these claims has kept corruption a central critique of his presidency.

=== Nepotism ===
Nepotism has been another significant controversy dogging Hassan Sheikh Mohamud's leadership. Critics have accused him of appointing family members and close associates to key government positions, undermining meritocracy in a country desperate for competent governance.

=== Family appointments ===
During his first term, Mohamud faced backlash for allegedly favoring relatives in political and administrative roles. One notable example was the appointment of his son-in-law to a senior position within the Ministry of Foreign Affairs, a move critics labeled as blatant nepotism. Somali parliamentarians and civil society groups argued that such appointments prioritized loyalty over qualifications, exacerbating clan tensions in a nation where balancing regional and familial interests is politically sensitive.

In his second term, similar accusations emerged. Reports circulated in 2023 that Mohamud's administration had placed several relatives in advisory roles or lucrative government contracts, particularly in Mogadishu's reconstruction projects. While specific names and positions remain debated, the perception of favoritism has damaged his credibility among urban elites and rural communities alike, who see these moves as reinforcing a clan-based power structure rather than fostering national unity.

On October 2024, Adam Roble, the son-in-law of President Hassan Sheikh Mohamud who married to Jihaan Hassan Sheikh Mohamud was appointed as the Director General of the Development and Reconstruction Bank of Somalia.

== Freedom of speech ==
Mohamud administration arrested four young TikTok influencers on 16 September 2025, for posting a dance video making fun of him, marking the first such case targeting a high-profile politician.

While the original video has been forcibly removed from the platform, it continues to be widely shared on TikTok and other social media platforms.

This incident has reignited debates over freedom of expression and the regulation of social media in the country.

=== Reporters detentions ===
Mohamud's administration have detained journalist Abdiaziz Abdinur Ibrahim and two others after a woman accused state security forces of raping her. The woman, along with a female acquaintance, was detained by police in January 2013. During interrogations, police pressured the woman to reveal journalists who interviewed her. Abdiaziz, a freelance journalist, was detained after he spoke to the woman about her allegations. Police also searched his home without clear authorization.

This incident seems linked to an Al Jazeera article about rape in displaced persons' camps. The police interrogated Abdiaziz about his role in the article, despite him not working with Al Jazeera. Other journalists and a women's rights worker who assisted the woman were also questioned.

Human Rights Watch condemned the detentions, calling on the Somali government to hold the security forces accountable and protect victims and journalists. The case undermines efforts to combat impunity and sexual violence in the country. The organization urged President Hassan Sheikh Mohamud, who previously pledged to hold security forces accountable, to ensure that the police do not intimidate victims or reporters.

== Forced deportation ==
The president's procedure to engaging with international partners has sometimes been viewed as inconsistent, particularly with Western countries who are significant donors and supporters of Somalia.

On 6 November 2024, Hassan Sheikh Mohamud met German Chancellor Olaf Scholz in Berlin to talk about Germany's "forced" deportation of Somalis. Which caused outrage of the Somali people in Germany. Mohamud said "They are welcome to return to their homeland, be with their families, and rejoin their communities, where they can help Somalia develop and be part of the country's progress."

== Impeachment ==
Efforts to impeach Hassan Sheikh Mohamud have marked some of the most shocking moments of his political career.

=== First term impeachment attempt (2015) ===
In August 2015, a group of Somali parliamentarians initiated an impeachment motion against Mohamud, citing corruption, abuse of power, and failure to address security threats. The motion, supported by over 90 lawmakers, accused him of violating the constitution by extending his influence over independent institutions, including the judiciary and electoral bodies.

The impeachment effort ultimately failed due to procedural hurdles and political maneuvering. Mohamud's allies in parliament rallied to block the motion, and international pressure.

== Constitutional crisis ==
=== 2023 ===
On May 28, 2023, President Hassan Sheikh Mohamud announced plans to shift to universal suffrage, replacing the clan-based election system. This decision followed a conference in Mogadishu where the National Consultative Council (NCC) agreed to implement direct elections by 2024, moving away from the 4.5 clan-based voting system.

Meanwhile, President Mohamud's push for constitutional amendments to expand presidential powers raised concerns about Somalia's stability. Critics argued that the changes were made without sufficient consultation with key political groups, including federal member states like Puntland and Somaliland.

In response, a group of Somali parliamentarians formed the National Correction Caucus in November 2023 to defend the constitution. The proposed amendments include shifting from a parliamentary to a presidential system, abolishing the prime minister position, and introducing direct presidential elections. These changes also limit federal autonomy and require state leaders to seek re-election after five years.

=== Second US security warning ===
On 7 March, Mohamud dismissed reports that the Somali federal government faces a security threat from Al-Shabaab and other terrorists, calling them “foreign propaganda” and a “pro-terrorist group.” His reaction was a response to the security warning issued by the U.S. embassy in Mogadishu after it had cautioned about the possibility of imminent attacks on Mogadishu's airport.

=== Term extension ===
On 15 May, Mohamud broke his constitutional presidential term limit. His four-year constitutional term was expired and ended with no plan for an upcoming election, later three days of talks mediated by the UK and US between the Somali federal government and the opposition Somali Future Council collapses over their legal future and the electoral process.

On 15 June, Puntland President Said Abdullahi Deni accused Mohamud of deliberately dismantling Somalia's federal system and fuelling piracy during the opening of the 58th session of the Puntland House of Representatives.

== Security ==
Security remains the most contentious aspect of Mohamud's leadership, given Somalia's ongoing conflict with Al-Shabaab and other militant groups.

=== First term security failures ===
During his 2012–2017 tenure, Mohamud pledged to defeat Al-Shabaab and restore order to Somalia. However, the group retained control over vast rural areas and launched devastating attacks in Mogadishu, including the 2013 Westgate-style assault on the Turkish embassy compound. citizens accused Mohamud of mismanaging the Somali National Army and relying too heavily on African Union Mission in Somalia forces, rather than building domestic capacity.

=== Al-Shabaab resurgence ===
Since 2022, Mohamud has declared an "all-out war" on Al-Shabaab, mobilizing clan militias and securing U.S. drone support. While initial gains reclaimed some territory, the group's resilience was evident in the October 2022 twin bombings in Mogadishu, which killed over 100 people which caused Mohamud's strategy to lack coherence, with insufficient focus on addressing the root causes of insurgency, such as poverty and governance failures. The rise of Islamic State affiliates in Puntland has added another layer of complexity, prompting accusations that his administration is overstretched and ineffective.

== Diplomatic crisis ==
=== Ethiopia ===
Mohamud's handling of Ethiopian troops in Somalia, part of the AU mission, has also drawn scrutiny. In 2024, he threatened to expel them over Ethiopia's Somaliland port deal, a move critics called reckless given their role in countering Al-Shabaab. His subsequent reconciliation with Ethiopia, mediated by Turkey, mitigated the crisis but left lingering doubts about his diplomatic acumen in managing security partnerships.

=== Kenya ===
On 11 December 2024, Somali forces loyal to Hassan Sheikh launched a failed attack on Jubaland regional forces in the Marnani area near Ras Kamboni. After federal government deployed Somali troops from Mogadishu, Banadir region to Lower Juba region in an attempt to throw out President Ahmed Madobe. At the end of the battle, Jubaland captured hundreds of Somali soldiers and took back Ras Kamboni, Lower Juba.

=== Travel ban ===
In February 2018, Hassan Sheikh Mohamud was denied a visa to Sweden. The visa was not issued because the Swedish Embassy in Ankara, Turkey, refused to stamp it on his passport.

On March 26, 2018, he was also denied a U.S. visa to participate in a lecture organized by the World Council Affairs of Maine (WCM) in the state of Maine was denied a visa under Trump's Executive Order 13769 that restricts admission of citizens from seven countries including six Muslim countries Libya, Syria, Somalia, Sudan,Yemen and Iran to protect the U.S. from foreign terrorists.
