= Malini Subramaniam =

Indian journalist (born c. 1964)

- Occupation: Independent Journalist
- Employer: Contributor to Scroll.in
- Known for: Her reporting on human rights.
- Notable work: https://scroll.in/author/1202
- Style: Ground reporting
- Awards: International Press Freedom Award (2016), Oxfam Novib/PEN International Freedom of speech award (2017)
- Website: https://scroll.in/author/1202

Malini Subramaniam (born c.1964) is an Indian independent journalist and the former head of the Chhattisgarh chapter of the International Committee of the Red Cross. She is a contributor to the Indian digital news outlet Scroll.in, reporting on human rights abuses from where she lived in the city of Jagdalpur in Bastar district of Chhattisgarh state. She was viewed as a supporter of the Maoists and driven from Jagdalpur by anti-Maoists and authorities.

== Career ==
Subramaniam is a contributor to the news website Scroll.In. She has been reporting on human rights issues in Bastar, Chhattisgarh. Her reports contained information on abuses committed by the police and security personnel, sexual violence against women, the illegal jailing of minors, the shutdown of schools, extrajudicial killings and threats against journalists. She was the subject of harassment from police and men in the community.

Malini Subramaniam formerly lived in her Bastar home with her family. Throughout her career she has been interrogated, followed, and harassed by police and members of a pro-police vigilante group.

On the evening of 7 February 2016, a group of approximately twenty individuals congregated in front of Subramaniam's home with a goal to pin her neighbors against her and to provoke them to join in on the attacks. The next morning, 8 February 2016, her home was attacked by a group associated with Samajik Ekta Manch, who are anti-Maoists. They threw stones at her home and car windows shattering the glass of her car. She attempted to gain help through a police investigation but was essentially ignored. On 18 February 2016, Subramaniam and her family were forced to leave her home by eviction notice. It is believed that her landlord was threatened to do so. Through all of the struggle, Subramaniam refuses to give up and plans to go back to Bastar whenever the time is right.

Jagdalpur is shown within India relative to the capital New Delhi.

== Context ==
The harassment of Malini Subramaniam is part of a larger attack on activists, lawyers and journalists standing up against abuses committed by police in the Bastar District. One former Army General called journalists "presstitudes" to feed into the negative climate around 2016. Investigations have been ongoing in the region pertaining to human rights because of a long-running confrontation between government forces and Maoist rebels trying to take over the region. The India Today news channel conducted one investigation that tied police together with Samajik Ekta Manch. Police pressure journalists to serve as information delivers and jail those of report badly on them. Several journalists have been killed in this area for reporting on critical content.

The anti-Maoist organization Samajik Ekta Manch was banned on 15 April 2016, as a result of activities like those directed at Subramaniam

== Reactions ==
The members of the Network of Women in Media, India, strongly expressed their disdain of the attack on Subramaniam.

Joel Simon, CPJ executive director, expressed his reasoning behind honoring Subramaiam with the International Press Freedom Award. He recognized her for risking her life to report to society and global community the critical news events happening around her.

== Awards ==
In 2016, Subramaniam won an International Press Freedom Award from the Committee to Protect Journalists. She won the 2017 Oxfam Novib/PEN Award for Freedom of Expression along with imprisoned Saudi Arabian poet Ashraf Fayadh.
