= Michael R. White (U.S. veteran) =

American U.S. Navy veteran imprisoned in Iran

Michael R. White is an American U.S. Navy veteran from Imperial Beach, California. In July 2018, Iranian authorities arrested him while he was visiting his girlfriend in Iran. News of his detention was first reported by IranWire in January 2019 and confirmed by The New York Times.

== Sentencing and allegations ==
In March 2019, the Iranian judiciary sentenced White to ten years in prison based on two charges: "insulting the country's top leader and posting a private photograph publicly." He was held in Vakilabad Prison in the city of Mashhad.

On March 19, 2020, he was released under a medical furlough on humanitarian grounds to the custody of the Swiss Embassy, conditional upon him staying in Iran.

The news of White's imprisonment was first revealed by a former political prisoner, Ivar Farhadi, who had been imprisoned in Mashhad Central Prison for some time and had seen White there.

== Release ==
In June 2020, right after the U.S. had released Sirous Asgari to Iran, White left his house arrest in Iran for Switzerland.

== See also ==
- List of foreign nationals detained in Iran
