= John Asfour =

Lebanese–Canadian poet, writer, and teacher

John Mikhail Asfour
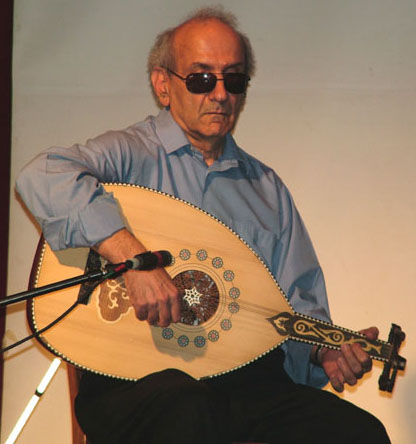
- Born: 1945; Aitanite, Lebanon
- Died: November 2014 (aged 68–69); Montreal, Quebec, Canada
- Occupations: Poet, writer, teacher, translator, activist

John Asfour (Arabic: جون عصفور) was a Lebanese–Canadian poet, writer, and teacher. At the age of 13, a grenade exploded in his face, blinding him during the Lebanese crisis of 1958.

After multiple unsuccessful attempts to restore his sight, he moved to Canada in 1968. After receiving his PhD in poetry from McGill University, he spent his career as a professor of literature and resided in Montreal, Quebec, Canada.

He was the author of 5 volumes of poetry in English, and two in Arabic, he selected, edited and translated into English the landmark anthology When the Words Burn: An Anthology of Modern Arabic Poetry and co-authored with his wife and fellow author Alison Burch a volume of selected poems by Muhammad al-Maghut entitled Joy is not my Profession. Asfour was known for his readings and lectures, which were entirely memorized due to his lack of sight.

Asfour was President of the Canadian Arab Federation from 1996 to 2002, and spoke out against revisions to the anti-terrorism bill C-36 after the September 11 attacks. In 2005 and 2007, he organized and held two conferences on Arab Immigrants, their rights and duties for the Ministry of Immigration of Quebec.

== Awards ==
- F.G. Bressani Literary Prize
- Canada Council for the Arts Joseph Staford Award,
- 2009: Inaugural Writer-in-Residence, Historic Joy Kogawa House, Vancouver B.C.
- 2001–2004: Chair of the Advisory Committee on Arab and Moslem Affairs for the Ministry of Canadian Multiculturalism
- 1996–2002: President of the Canadian Arab Federation

== Publications ==
John Asfour Publications include:

=== Books ===
French

- 2014: Les Yeux Bandés par John Asfour traduit par Jean-Pierre Pelletier, éditions Le Noroît, 95 pp.
- 2009: Nisan: poésie par John Asfour traduit par Nadine Ltaif éditions Le Noroît, 103 pp.

English

- 2016: Faraj Bayrakdar. Mirrors of Absence, Guernica, 2015
- 2012: V6A: Writing from Vancouver's Downtown EastsideEdited by: John Mikhail Asfour and Elee Kraljii Gardiner, foreword by Gary Geddes Arsenal Pulp Press, Vancouver, B.C.
- 2011: Blindfold
- 2009: Thursdays 2: Writings from the Carnegie Centre Edited by: Elee Kraljii Gardiner and John Mikhail Asfour, Otter Press, Vancouver, B.C.
- 1997: Fields of My Blood (poetry), Emperyal Press, Montreal, Quebec, Canada
- 1994: Joy is Not My Profession: Selected Poems of Muhammad al-Maghut, trans. and introd. Co-author A. Burch, Véhicule Press, Montreal, Quebec, Canada
- 1994 and 1995: Corridors: A Concordia Anthology (poetry & fiction), Assoc. Editor. Downtown Press, Montreal.
- 1992: One Fish From the Rooftop (poetry), Cormorant Books, Maxville, Canada. winner of the 1994 F.G. Bressani Literary Prize (Vancouver, B.C.). Trans. into Arabic as Samakah min ala al-sath (see below)
- 1988, 1992: When The Words Burn: An Anthology of Modern Arabic Poetry, & 1993, 1995, 1945 – 1987, selected, translated into English and introd., Cormorant Books, Maxville, Canada. Second ed., 1992.
- Short-listed for the League of Poets Award (1990) and the John Glassco Award for Translation (1990)
- Published for distribution in the Middle East by American Univ. in Cairo Press, Cairo, Egypt (1993), and by Inforium Press, Ankara, Turkey (1995)
- 1981:Land of Flowers and Guns (poetry), introd. Louis Dudek, D.C. Books, Montreal, Quebec, Canada. Trans. into Arabic as Wurud wa-banadiq (see below)
- 1976: N an: A Book of Poetry, Fiddlehead Books, Univ. of New Brunswick Press, Fredericton, Canada

Arabic

- 2000: Wurud wa-banadiq (Flowers and Guns; trans. from English to Arabic). Author & trans. Co-translator Hatim Salman. Bisan Press, Beirut and Damascus.
- 2000: Samakah min ala al-sath (One Fish from the Rooftop; trans. from English to Arabic). Author & trans. Co-translator Abd al-Hakim Ajhar. Bisan Press, Beirut and Damascus.
- 2002: Hariq al-Kalimat (When the Words Burn; trans. from English to Arabic). Trans. Mona Fadel. Amwaj Press, Beirut and Damascus.

=== Articles ===
English

- 2008: Saadi Youssef: a poet in exile, The Montreal Gazette, Montreal Canada
- 2005: Muhammad al-Maghut: the voice of the voiceless, The Montreal Gazette, Montreal Canada
- 1993: Entry for "Muhammad al-Maghut" in the Encyclopedia of World Literature in the Twentieth Century, New York (The Continuum Publishing Company), Vol. V., pp. 402–03. Ed. Steven Serafin & Walter Glanze
- 1989: "Adonis and Muhammad al Maghut: Two Voices in a Burning Land," Journal of Arabic Literature, Glasgow, Scotland, Vol. XX, pp. 10–30.
- 1989: "Muhammad al Maghut and the Surplus Man," Edebiyat, (Univ. of Penn.), New Series Vol. I, No. 2, pp. 23–40. Co-author A. Burch

Poems & Translations
(English)

- 1987 ff.: Poems and translations in:
- North American periodicals—e.g., PRISM international, Zymergy, Mizna, Parnassus, Chelsea, Absynthe
- Newspapers—e.g., The Toronto Star, The Globe and Mail, The Ottawa Citizen, the Gazette
- Anthologies—e.g., The Signal Anthology, Montreal (Véhicule Press, 1993); TransLit Calgary (ATIA, 1994)
- Literary broadcasts—radio (BBC, CJAD, CJFM) and television (CF Cable, CBC)
