= Irakli Kakabadze =

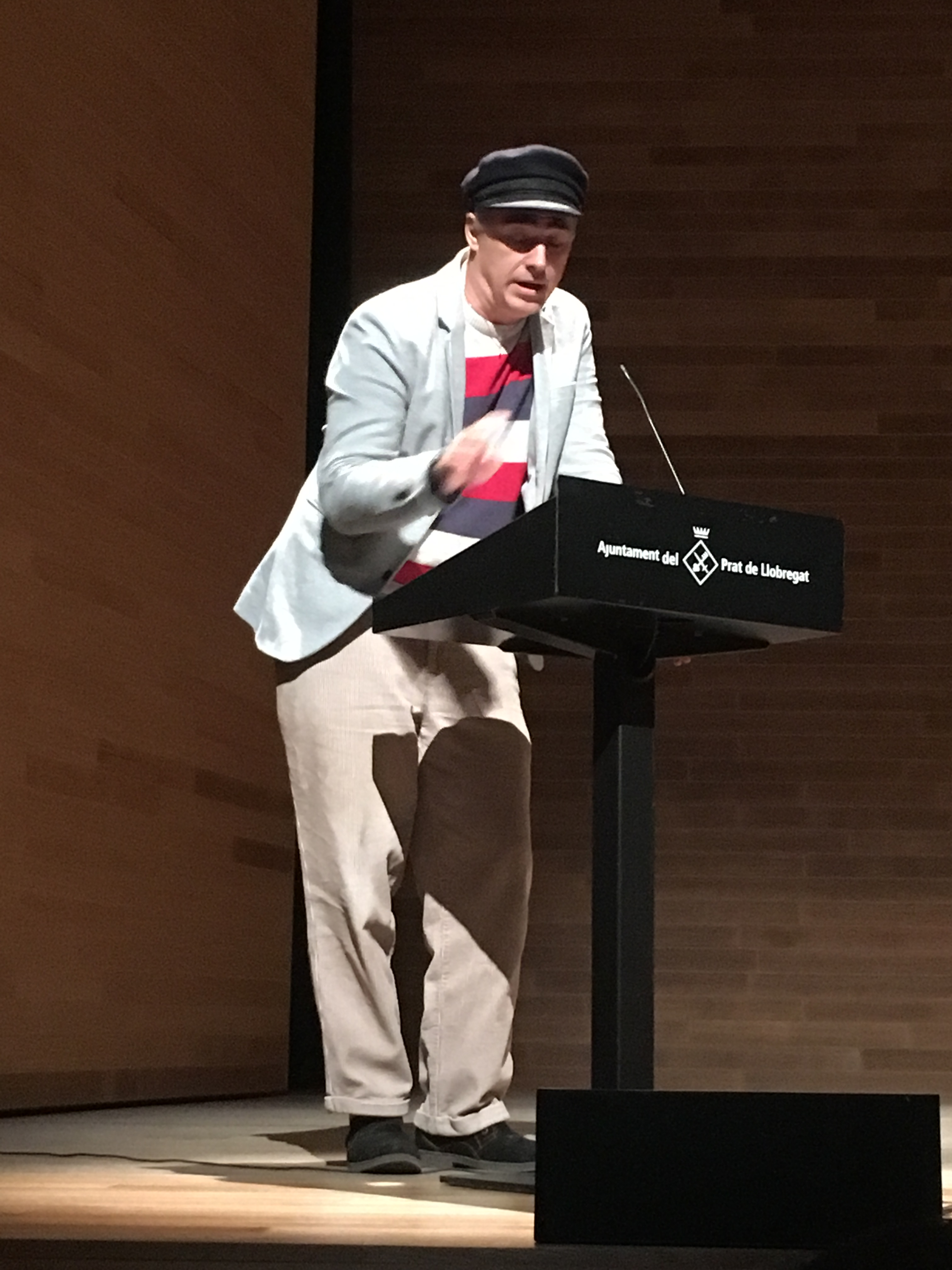
Kakabadze in 2017.

Irakli Kakabadze (Georgian: ირაკლი კაკაბაძე; born 1969) is a Georgian writer, performance artist, peace and human rights activist. In 2009, he was awarded the Oxfam/Novib PEN Freedom of Expression Prize. Kakabadze's articles and stories have been published in Georgian, Russian, and English newspapers and magazines. In 2007 he received the Lilian Hellman/Hammett grant from Human Rights Watch. From 2008 to 2012, Kakabadze was based in Ithaca, NY, where he developed a new method of integrating performing arts and social sciences, called "Rethinking Tragedy" or "Transformative Performance." Kakabadze has also pioneered a multi-lingual and multi-narrative performing style, called Polyphonic Discourse. Irakli Kakabadze's work as an artist-activist is subject of a verite documentary At the Top of My Voice.

== Biography ==
Kakabadze was born in 1969. In his early youth (1987–1990) Irakli Kakabadze was actively involved in the anti-Soviet dissident movement and participated in the National Liberation movement of Georgia. By 1989 he was the youngest member of the National Liberation Committee formed by the first President of Georgia, Zviad Gamsakhurdia. In 1990, at the age of 21 he was elected to the National Forum of Georgia, which included the nine strongest political parties there. Kakabadze was not eligible to run due to his age, but he helped the liberation movement to win October 1990 elections by a wide margin. After the election of Zviad Gamsakhurdia as Georgia's President, Kakabadze quit his political activities and dedicated himself to literature and arts. He moved to the United States in 1990 and then adopted a bilingual writing style. Kakabadze also works in the field of peace studies and conflict resolution. He has been a practitioner of nonviolent social change and conflict resolution for nearly two decades. He was an active participant of two peaceful revolutions in 1989 (as one of the leaders of student movement) and in 2003 (as one of the leaders of civil disobedience committee).

During his work as peace and human rights activist in 1988–2010, Kakabadze was arrested and assaulted a number of times by the Soviet and Georgian police. From 2000 to 2015 he worked as a South Caucasus coordinator for Institute for Multi-Track Diplomacy in Washington, DC. Kakabadze also works in the field of peace studies, nonviolence and conflict resolution. He has been a practitioner of nonviolent social change and conflict resolution for nearly three decades. He was an active participant of two peaceful revolutions in 1989 (as one of the leaders of student movement) and in 2003 (as one of the leaders of civil disobedience committee). During his work as peace and human rights activist in 1988–2017, Kakabadze was arrested and assaulted a number of times by the Soviet and Georgian police. He was first arrested by Saakashvili regime in 2006 and his last arrest happened in December 2015 after protesting the appointment of Mr. Murusidze to the supreme court of Georgia. Irakli Kakabadze was advocating for political, social and economic rights of people in Georgia since 1988. His campaigns included the campaign against death penalty that was implemented in 1998, against 'Death Squads' in 2006 that has also brought some perpetrators to justice in 2013 and now for socio-economic rights. Since 2015 Kakabadze has been actively involved in the movement of homeless and landless in Georgia, who are advocating for their own socio-economic rights as citizens of Georgia.

== Literary career ==
Irakli Kakabadze has published more than 500 short stories and essays in Georgian and English newspapers and magazines. His novel, Allegro or The Chronicle of One Year received the 1990 Best Literary Creation Award from the Georgian magazine Tsiskari. His play “Candidate Jokola” was controversial in Georgia, as it was about a love story between a Georgian presidential candidate and an Abkhaz woman. In 2009, he was awarded the Oxfam/Novib PEN Freedom of Expression Prize. Kakabadze's articles and stories have been published in Georgian, Russian, and English newspapers and magazines. In 2007 he received the Lilian Hellman/Hammett grant from Human Rights Watch. From 2008 to 2012, Kakabadze was based in Ithaca, NY, where he developed a new method of integrating performing arts and social sciences, called "Rethinking Tragedy" or "Transformative Performance." Kakabadze has also pioneered a multi-lingual and multi-narrative performing style, called Polyphonic Discourse. Irakli Kakabadze's work as an artist-activist is subject of an American verite documentary At the Top of My Voice filmed by Indian American Director Sudhir Venkatesh and Larry Kammerman.

== SHMAZI Transformative Performance style ==
The word Shmazi was born in the mid-1990s while Kakabadze was studying at George Mason University in Virginia, USA. Kakabadze integrated performance and conflict resolution sessions in 1997 together with Daniel McFarland and KP-Funk Band. “Shmazi” style of performing art combines performance with facilitated problem-solving workshops. In 1998-99 he took part in Shmazi performances together with American authors, including Yana Djin, Quique Aviles, singer Luci Murphy and musicians Allison Wolfe, and Natalie Avery. Initially, Shmazi events were directed mostly against the bourgeois gentrification policies in the Mount Pleasant neighborhood of Washington, DC. Shmazi became synonymous with political performing arts, challenging the economic order of class domination. But at the same time Kakabadze and his colleagues were facilitating conflict transformation through artistic performances.

After returning to Georgia Kakabadze started to collaborate with one of the leading composers of electronic music Gogi Dzodzuashvili. Dzodzuashvili and Kakabadze created the well-known electronic song “Postindustrial Boys” - one of the popular songs in Europe. Kakabadze developed Polyphonic Discourse that included differing narratives in the same artistic piece. “Tbilisi at the End of 20th” century was one of the first Shmazi performances, featuring multiple narratives. In 2003 Kakabadze together with Giorgi Sikharulidze created “Theater for Change” based on Augusto Boal's facilitation technique. This time the goal was to contribute to social change through artistic action. The work of this theater under the leadership of Giorgi Sikharulidze and Irakli Kakabadze contributed significantly to the non-violent “Rose Revolution’ in November, 2003. Kakabadze has taught this method for years in different universities, including at Cornell University, Hobart & William Smith Colleges, Georgian-American University. Irakli Kakabadze was one of the main organizers of Peace Festivals in Georgia in 2000 and 2014. Together with Irakli Gogia he has invented new style of creative peace building activities called CREATE. Founder of Peace Research Institute Oslo Johan Galtung visited Georgia twice by the invitation of Irakli Kakabadze and have proposed the new peace building solutions for South Caucasus in 2013. New method of creative peace building and nonviolent change called CREATE (Conflict Resolution through Expressive Artistic Transformation and Education) was first elaborated by Kakabadze at Cornell University together with Bruce Levitt in 2010-12 and in 2014-17 together with Georgian Director Irakli Gogia. Kakabadze became a chair of Gandhi Foundation Georgia in July, 2014 and has hosted since number of events teaching Gandhian values and inviting number of well known Gandhian scholars and practitioners to Georgia and Armenia. In 2015 Kakabadze together with Arsen Kharatyan helped to co-found Gandhi Foundation Armenia. Since 1997 Kakabadze has worked tirelessly to bridge Georgian-Abkhaz conflict. In 2016 Gandhi Center of Nonviolence and Peace was founded in Batumi State University that is located in autonomous republic of Adjara, Georgia.

== Polyphonic Discourse ==
Irakli Kakabadze was an Editor-in-Chief of the bi-lingual (Georgian-English) literary-social science magazine “Peace Times” in 2001–2004 in Tbilisi, Georgia. This is where he started to explore multi-lingual and multi-discourse style of writing. The magazine combined the discourse of creative multi-media art with multi-disciplinary peace science. It was at this journal that Kakabadze started to publish Georgian, Russian, English and German texts. Polyphonic discourse as a method originates from traditional Georgian folk music and from the writings of Russian literary scientist Mikhail Bakhtin. Together with his colleague Zurab Rtveliashvili, Kakabadze has used this technique to bring it to writing and performance – articulating different narratives at the same time. In their joint works “The Georgian Humanist Manifesto of 21st Century” (2005) and “Contemporary Dada Manifesto” (2009) they have shown two distinctly different narratives coexisting in the same performance while not breaking up it harmony. A decentralized style of performance and artistic delivery became a signature style of these artists. Many critics connected these polyphonic performances with the advance of multicultural postmodern narrative in the West – but according to authors, this concept has its roots far deeper than simple trend on early 21st century.

In May 2008 Kakabadze shared a stage at PEN World Voices Festival in New York with György Dragomán, Hasan Elahi, Asli Erdogan, Péter Esterházy, Chenjerai Hove, Jenny Marketou, Ivy Meeropol, Francine Prose, and Ingo Schulze, at the Writers and Artists Against the Surveillance State.[20] In November 2008 at the Miami Book Fair Kakabadze shared a stage with Sarah Mkhonza, Russell Banks and Derek Walcott to perform another piece of Polyphonic Blues.[21]

Kakabadze has performed his polyphonic style of poetry at the Frankfurt Book Fair (2009) and “Free the Word” in London (2010) (23). At the 2010 “PEN World Voices” Festival in New York Kakabadze performed Polyphonic Discourse at the Cabaret Show that featured the author with Natalie Merchant, Ben Okri and Ariel Dorfman.

Kakabadze has performed his polyphonic style of poetry at the Frankfurt Book Fair (2009) and “Free the Word” in London (2010) (23). At the 2010 “PEN World Voices” Festival in New York Kakabadze performed Polyphonic Discourse at the Cabaret Show that featured the author with Natalie Merchant, Ben Okri and Ariel Dorfman. He has performed at many literary and peace festivals including in Berlin (2014), Palma De Mallorca (2016), Valencia (2016), ext. His book 'Umberto vs Ernesto' or 'Marginal Delirium' was published and has introduced polyphonic discourse in December 2013. In 2017 publishing house 'Intelekti' has published another book of his essays "Love Doctrine" that is highly influenced by the works of Mahatma Gandhi.

== Books ==
- Times Square - Circle of the Time (1998, Publishing house "Azri") – in Georgian
- Allegro or the Chronicle of One Year - (2002, "Azri") – in Georgian
- Compassionata - (2004, "Siesta") – in Georgian
- Candidate Jokola - (2005, "Siesta") in Georgian & (2010, Vista-Periodista) in English

• Land of Flowers – Liberation Theology – (2010, Vista-Periodista) in English & Georgian • Polyphonic Country – 2010 – Cornell University • Ernesto Ecologist vs Umberto Eco-logist - Marginal Delirium - (2014, Palitra L) in English and Georgian • Doctrine of Love - (2017, Intelekti) - in Georgian • Revolta Permanent - (2017, PEN Catala) - in Georgian, English and Catala

== Articles ==
- http://www.atthetopofmyvoice.com/atv/about.html - At the Top of My Voice by Larry Kamerman and Sudhir Venkatesh
- cornell.edu
- An Interview with IrakliKakabadze | ICORN international cities of refuge network - Articles. Icorn.org. Retrieved on 2009-02-05
- https://www.youtube.com/watch?v=re-1R1Cyl0o - Rtveliashvili-Kakabadze Dada Manifesto in Gotenburg, 2009
- https://web.archive.org/web/20111028003049/http://arcade.stanford.edu/zurab-rtveliashvili-and-shmazi-transformational-street-theater
- https://vistaperiodista.blogspot.com/2010/01/rose-anthempolyphonic-blues.html
- https://web.archive.org/web/20081011111636/http://www.pen.org/viewmedia.php/prmMID/1952/prmID/1582 [1]
- https://web.archive.org/web/20110713091640/http://www.internationalpen.org.uk/index.cfm?objectid=67B5EFC3-3048-676E-2609C868F89AFB1B
- cornell.edu
- https://www.youtube.com/watch?v=y48lgojN7J8
- http://www.imtd.org/pdfs/OP15.pdf
- cornell.edu
