= Detention of Abdiaziz Abdinur Ibrahim =

Mass arresting and detaining of a group journalist incident in Mogadishu, February 2013

- Part of Controversies of Hassan Sheikh Mohamud
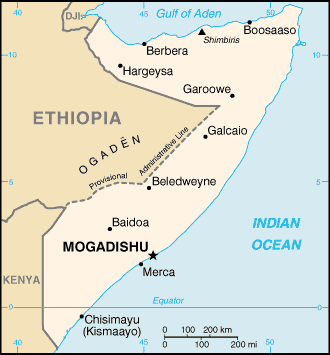
- Date: February 1 – March 17, 2013

The detention of Abdiaziz Abdinur Ibrahim began in February 2013 when journalist Abdiaziz Abdinur Ibrahim interviewed Lul Ali Osman, who claimed that she was raped by government security forces while living in an internally displaced peoples camp in Mogadishu, Somalia. The two were arrested, tried, and sentenced to a year in prison for having allegedly fabricated the story. The trial was described by some human rights groups as politically motivated. Osman was later in the month acquitted following an appeal, and Ibrahim's sentence was reduced to six months. It was concurrently announced that an Independent Task Force on Human Rights had been established, which would review his case to see if due process has been followed. Ibrahim was released from detention the following month, on 17 March 2013.

== Incidents ==
In December 2012, Lul Ali Osman, a 27-year-old mother, claimed to have been gang-raped earlier that year by five security officers employed by the government. The police commissioner, General Sharif Shekuna Maye, stated that there was no evidence that Osman had been raped and dismissed the story as "propaganda". On 6 January 2013, local reporter Abdiaziz Abdinur Ibrahim interviewed Osman regarding her story.

On 10 January 2013, Colonel Abdullahi Hassan Bariise, the head of Somalia's Criminal Investigation Department (CID), detained Osman and used her phone to contact Ibrahim. Upon being interrogated at the CID, Ibrahim admitted to having interviewed Osman, and was detained. A week later, Maye held a press conference in which he charged that Ibrahim had been involved with an Al Jazeera report on sexual violence in IDP camps in the capital. Human Rights Watch asserted that Ibrahim had no connection with Al Jazeera and had not published any of his findings, as did Al-Jazeera.

Ibrahim was charged with "insulting state institutions", and Osman was charged with "insulting a political body". The trial began on 2 February in a court in Mogadishu. The prosecution called upon a midwife who testified that Osman had not been raped. The defense was not permitted to present witnesses or medical evidence to the court. On 5 February, the defendants were sentenced to a year in prison. Osman's sentence was deferred until she had completed breastfeeding her child.

After the sentencing, Kulmiye Radio journalist Daud Abdi Daud spoke out in court, arguing that reporters should have the right to interview other citizens. When he reportedly claimed that he would seek to interview the president's wife, he was arrested. Daud was released after a week in custody.

Ibrahim and Osman appealed their conviction, and appeared in a court in Banaadir on 20 February. Judge Hassan Mohamed Ali heard evidence from their defense attorney, Mohamed Ibrahim, before adjourning the court for one week. On 3 March, Judge Ali upheld Abdiaziz Ibrahim's conviction, stating that he "misled the alleged rape victim into the interview", but reduced his sentence from one year to six months. The court ruled that there was insufficient evidence to convict Osman, and declared her not guilty.

== Responses ==
The National Union of Somali Journalists protested the detention of Ibrahim, and described his upheld conviction as "unjust". Audrey Gaughran, Africa program director at Amnesty International, said that the manner in which the case was handled "risks discouraging victims of rape and other forms of sexual violence and the media from talking about this taboo subject". Daniel Bekele, Africa director of Human Rights Watch, stated that the trial was "flawed by serious violations of due process" and that it suggested the Somali government was "more concerned with deflecting criticism than protecting ordinary citizens." When Ibrahim's conviction was upheld, Bekele said that "the court of appeals missed a chance to right a terrible wrong".

Navi Pillay, the United Nations (UN) High Commissioner for Human Rights, said that it is "deeply disturbing that a woman alleging rape can be penalized for reporting such a crime, and a journalist jailed for investigating it." UN Secretary General Ban Ki-moon issued a statement expressing his disappointment regarding the sentences given to Ibrahim and Osman.

Abdi Farah Shirdon, Somalia's Prime Minister, commented on the issue, saying that he would not intervene because the judiciary and the executive are independent branches of government. He described the work of journalists as "essential", and urged the courts to follow due process throughout the proceedings. After the appeal verdict was announced and Osman was released, Shirdon praised the decision, remarking that "we are a step closer to justice being done." He also indicated that although Ibrahim's sentence was reduced to six months, he had ultimately hoped for the journalist's release since he believed that Ibrahim was simply reporting a story and since freedom of expression is guaranteed in the constitution.

== Task Force ==
Concurrent with the Ibrahim affair, Prime Minister Shirdon launched an Independent Task Force on Human Rights in February 2013 in order to firm up on the protection of individual rights. The 13-member committee of volunteers was formed after extensive consultations with civil society groups and the Speaker of Parliament, Mohamed Osman Jawari. Chaired by prominent human rights attorney Maryam Yusuf Sheikh Ali, one of four women on the panel, the Task Force includes an educator, a peace activist, leaders of Somali women's organizations, senior police officers, a humanitarian campaigner, a religious leader, and a media representative. It is tasked with investigating allegations of human rights abuses and journalist intimidation, including the Ibrahim case in Mogadishu, which it will review to see if due process has been followed. At the end of its three-month mandate, the committee is scheduled to publish a report on its findings and recommended courses of action. The Task Force will eventually give way to a permanent parliamentary Human Rights Commission, which will have the capacity to investigate allegations over a longer period.

== Release ==
On 17 March 2013, Somalia's apex court released Ibrahim from prison and dropped all charges against him. Judge Aidid Abdullahi Ilka-Hanaf cited lack of evidence as the reason for the acquittal. Upon his release, Ibrahim stated "I am happy that I got my freedom back and I thank all those who took part in the effort to bring a just end to this case particularly my lawyers and colleagues."

In 2014, Ibrahim was one of three winners of the Oxfam Novib/PEN Award. The prize is annually presented to recognize writers who have been persecuted for their work and continue working despite the consequences.
