= Samar Yazbek =

Syrian writer and journalist (born 1970)

- سمر يزبك
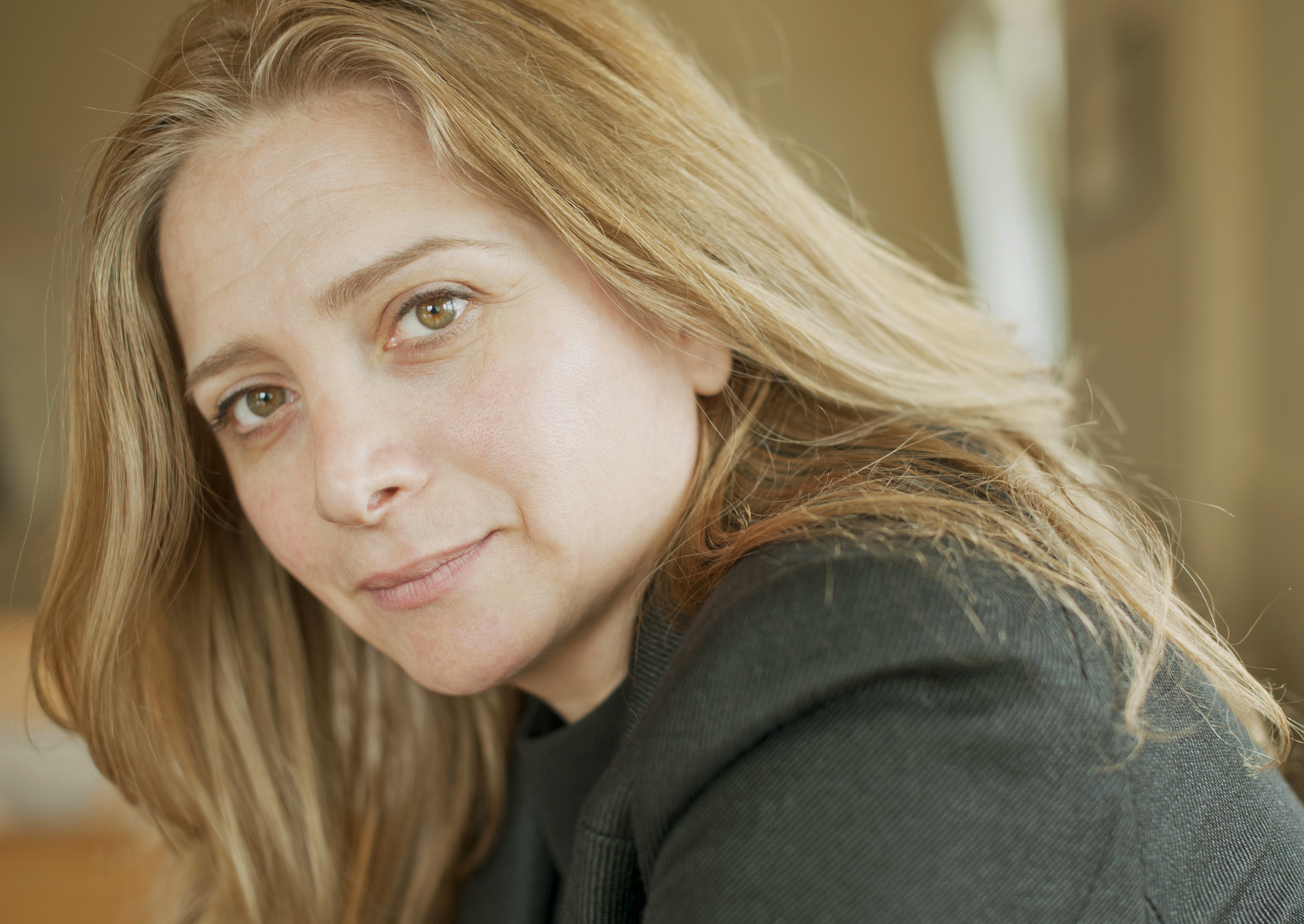
- Samar Yazbek in Istanbul (2013)
- Born: 18 August 1970 (age 56); Jableh, Syria
- Occupation: Writer
- Writing career
- Notable awards: 2016 Best Foreign Book award for “The crossing” (France) 2013 PEN-OXFAM Novib award for “A Woman in the Crossfire: Diaries of the Syrian Revolution” (The Netherlands) 2012 PEN Tucholsky award for “A Woman in the Crossfire: Diaries of the Syrian Revolution” (Sweden) 2012 PEN Pinter award for “A Woman in the Crossfire: Diaries of the Syrian Revolution” (UK) 2010 Selected in the “Beirut 39, Hay festival” selection of outstanding writers under 40 (Beirut) 2000 UNICEF, Best literary scenario award for “A falling sky” (TV script)
- Movement: Women Now for Development

Samar Yazbek (Arabic: سمر يزبك, born 1970 in Jableh, Syria) is a Syrian writer and journalist. She studied Arabic literature at Tishreen University (Latakia). She has written in a wide variety of genres including novels, short stories, film scripts, television dramas, film and TV criticism, and literary narratives. Several of her works have been translated from the Arabic original into other languages.

== Biography ==
Yazbek was born in Jableh to an Alawite family. In 2010, Yazbek was selected as one of the 39 most promising authors under the age of 40, by Beirut39, a contest organized by the Hay Festival. In 2011, she took part in the popular uprising against the Assad regime, and was forced into exile a few months later. In 2012, she was chosen for the prestigious PEN/Pinter Prize International writer of courage award, in recognition of her book A Woman in the Crossfire: Diaries of the Syrian Revolution. She was also awarded the Swedish Tucholsky Prize and the Dutch Oxfam/PEN prize in the same year. In 2016, Yazbek's literary narrative The Crossing was awarded the French “Best Foreign Book” prize. In 2024, the English translation by Leri Price of Where the Wind Calls Home was longlisted for the National Book Award for Translated Literature.

Yazbek also participated in the Syrian cultural caravan, which was an artistic and cultural movement led by Syrian artists that started with a project called "Freedom for the Syrian People" and involved a road trip across Europe.

== Works ==
Yazbek has been a prominent voice in support of human rights and more specifically women's rights in Syria. In 2012, she launched Women Now for Development, an NGO based in France that aims at empowering Syrian women economically and socially.

Year	Publications	Genre	Countries
2018	19 women: Tales of resilience from Syria	Literary narrative	France-Sweden-Italy
2017	Al-Mashāʾa [The one who walks (female)]	Novel	Translated to Danish ("Du må ikke dø")-Swedish ("Hon som vandrar")
2017	The Blue Pen	Novel	France-Sweden-Norway-Germany-Lebanon
2015	The Crossing	Literary narrative	France-Sweden-Norway–UK-Lebanon-Spain-Portugal-Poland-Malaysia-Greece-Romania-India-China-Italy-Japan
2012	A Woman in the Crossfire: Diaries of the Syrian Revolution	Literary narrative	France-UK-Netherlands-Switzerland-Turkey
2010	In Her Mirrors	Novel	Italy-Lebanon
2008	The Mountain of Lilies	Novel	Syria
2008	The Scent of Cinnamon	Novel	France-Sweden-Norway-Italy-UK-Switzerland-Lebanon
2005	Planet of Clay	Novel	Egypt
2002	A Girl from Heaven	Novel	Syria
2000	Words of Women	Short stories	Syria-Lebanon
1999	Autumn Flowers	Short stories	Syria

== Awards and distinctions ==
- 2022 Royal Society of Literature International Writer
- 2016 Best Foreign Book award for The crossing (France)
- 2013 PEN-OXFAM Novib award for A Woman in the Crossfire: Diaries of the Syrian Revolution (The Netherlands)
- 2012 PEN Tucholsky award for A Woman in the Crossfire: Diaries of the Syrian Revolution (Sweden)
- 2012 PEN Pinter award for A Woman in the Crossfire: Diaries of the Syrian Revolution (UK)
- 2010 Selected in the Beirut 39, Hay festival selection of outstanding writers under 40 (Beirut)
- 2000 UNICEF, Best literary scenario award to “A falling sky” (TV script)

== Other publications ==
- "Silence", PEN Atlas, February 2014
- "I write with blind eyes and forty fingers", Index on Censorship (UK), December 2014
- "On two and a half years of massacre in Syria", SvD (Sweden) & FAZ (Germany), September 2013
- "Syria’s inferno", Le Nouvel Observateur, bibliobs (France), September 2013
- "The novelist vs. the revolutionary: My own Syrian debate2, Washington Post (USA), September 2013
- "In the shadow of Assad’s bombs", The New York Times, OpEd (USA), August 2012
- "Two men", The Guardian (UK), August 2011
