= Amanuel Asrat =

Eritrean poet and journalist (born 1971)

- Born: 1971 (age 54–55)
- Occupations: Poet and journalist
- Awards: Oxfam Novib/PEN Award (2016); PEN Pinter Prize International Writer of Courage Award (2020)

Amanuel Asrat (Tigrinya: ኣማኑኤል ኣስራት; born 1971) is an Eritrean poet and former editor-in-chief of Zemen.

== Biography ==
A graduate of the University of Asmara, he is "largely credited for the Eritrean poetry resurgence of the early 2000s", as reported by The Guardian. In 2001, Amanuel together with two colleagues set up a grassroots literary club, and similar clubs were soon established across the country.

Asrat was arrested on 23 September 2001, along with 16 other journalists that year in the wake of a crackdown on the press in Eritrea, and is believed to be detained in a maximum security prison, although his whereabouts and state of health remain unknown.

In 2016, he was the recipient of an Oxfam Novib/PEN Award, accepted on his behalf by Eritrean-born Dutch journalist Habtom Yohannes.

In 2020, poet and activist Linton Kwesi Johnson, who was that year's winner of the PEN Pinter Prize (launched in 2009 by English PEN, a charity that defends freedom of expression and celebrates literature, in memory of playwright Harold Pinter), named Asrat as the "International Writer of Courage" with whom he chose to share the award.

== Awards ==
- 2016: Oxfam Novib/PEN Award
- 2020: PEN Pinter Prize International Writer of Courage Award
