= Sania Saleh =

Syrian poet (1935–1985)

- Born: 1939; Masyaf, Hama Governorate, Syria
- Died: 1995 (aged 55–56); Paris, France
- Education: University of Damascus
- Occupations: Poet, writer
- Years active: 1964-1982
- Known for: Modern Arabic poetry
- Spouse: Muhammad al-Maghut

Sania Saleh, also written Saniyah Saleh, (Arabic: سنية صالح; 1939–1995) was a Syrian short story writer and poet. In her lifetime, she published three poetry collections and one volume of short stories in Arabic. Considered a notable author of modern Arabic poetry by fellow poets and literary critics, she was awarded distinctions by Arabic magazines and newspapers.

Several of her poems have been translated into English by Marilyn Hacker and Robin Moger and published in literary online magazines.

== Biography ==
Saleh was born in the city of Masyaf, in the Hama Governorate to Ismaili parents. In the 1950s, she met the writer and poet Muhammad al-Maghut at the house of the poet Adonis in Beirut. In the late 1960s, she married al-Maghut, while she was still a student at the college of literature of the University of Damascus. They had two daughters, named Sham and Salafa, for whom she wrote a poem that was translated as You Will Go Out of the Body’s Walls.

In 1985, Saleh died at a hospital in Paris after a long illness.

== Works ==
- The Narrow Age (original title: al-Zaman al-Dayeq), (1964)
- Execution Ink, (original title: Hebr al-Idam), (1970)
- Dust (original title: al-Ghubar), (1982)
- Remembrance of Flowers (original title: Zikr al-Ward), (1988)
- Collected Poems

=== Poetry translated into English ===
- Autumn of Freedom
  Republished in Marilyn Hacker (ed.) Blazons: New and Selected Poems, 2000-2018
- The Deluge (Original and translation)
- The War of Memory (Original and translation)
- You Will Go Out of the Body’s Walls (excerpts)
- The Sadnesses of the Sparrows
- The Wound and the Vision
- The Roots of the Winds
- Eyes of Grass
- Final Death
- The Condemned Lakes
- The Straits of Air

== Awards ==
- Award for Best Modern Poem (The Sky’s Body) by An-Nahar newspaper (1961)
- Award for Short Stories by Hawaa magazine (1964)
- Award for Poetry by Al Hasnaa magazine (1967)

== Reception ==
The Egyptian poet Iman Mersal was under the impression that there were no modern Arab female poets for her – until she read Saleh's poems. In a 2016 interview, Mersal commented on Saleh's poetic style and imagery:

Saniya Saleh’s voice does not capture the listener’s ear because it represents a poetic movement with forebears, founders and imitators, nor because it is gifted a silence in which to be heard. It is because it is an individual voice, unique amid poetic ostentation, able to survive with its distinctive tone and pierce you, though hemmed round by prophets, heroes, martyrs and leaders

— Iman Mersal, Interview with the Egyptian poet Iman Mersal: Crossing a universal threshold

In 2023, Syrian poet Rasha Omran acknowledged Saleh's importance for Syrian women's poetry:

[Saniya Saleh] wrote a unique prose poem that was free from the influence of her husband, Muhammad Al-Maghout, and free from the Adonisian modernist perspectives [...]. Her poetry reflected her own self, but it was also a reflection of the feminine self, full of pain and extended genius that reaches back to the beginning of time. It embodied the pain and genius of the womb as the creator of the universe, in addition to its deep and indirect impact on Syrian feminist poetry.

— Rasha Omran, Women recommending Women, ArabLit & ArabLit Quarterly

== See also ==
- Modern Arabic literature
- Syrian literature
