= PEN Pinter Prize =

Annual British literary award

The PEN Pinter Prize and the Pinter International Writer of Courage Award both comprise an annual literary award launched in 2009 by English PEN in honour of the late Nobel Literature Prize-winning playwright Harold Pinter, who had been a Vice President of English PEN and an active member of the .International PEN Writers in Committee (WiPC).

The award is given to "a British writer or a writer resident in Britain of outstanding literary merit who, in the words of Pinter’s Nobel speech ['Art, Truth and Politics'], casts an 'unflinching, unswerving' gaze upon the world and shows 'a fierce, intellectual determination … to define the real truth of our lives and our societies'."

The Prize is shared with an "International Writer of Courage," defined as "someone who has been persecuted for speaking out about [his or her] beliefs," selected by English PEN's Writers at Risk Committee in consultation with the annual Prize winner, and announced during an award ceremony held at the British Library, on or around 10 October, the anniversary of Pinter's birth.

The PEN Pinter Prize is one of the many PEN literary awards sponsored by PEN International affiliates in "more than 200" PEN International Centers located around the world.

== Recipients ==
=== 2009 ===
- PEN Pinter Prize: Tony Harrison, poet and playwright
- International Writer of Courage Award: Zarganar (Maung Thura), Burmese artist

=== 2010 ===
- PEN Pinter Prize: Hanif Kureishi
- International Writer of Courage Award: Lydia Cacho, Mexican journalist and human rights activist

=== 2011 ===
- PEN Pinter Prize: David Hare, playwright
- International Writer of Courage Award: Roberto Saviano, Italian writer and journalist

=== 2012 ===
- PEN Pinter Prize: Carol Ann Duffy, poet
- International Writer of Courage Award: Samar Yazbek, Syrian writer

=== 2013 ===
- PEN Pinter Prize: Tom Stoppard, playwright
- International Writer of Courage Award: Iryna Khalip, Belarusian journalist

=== 2014 ===
- PEN Pinter Prize: Salman Rushdie, novelist
- International Writer of Courage Award: Mazen Darwish, Syrian lawyer and journalist

=== 2015 ===
- PEN Pinter Prize: James Fenton
- International Writer of Courage Award: Raif Badawi, Saudi activist

=== 2016 ===
- PEN Pinter Prize: Margaret Atwood
- International Writer of Courage Award: Ahmedur Rashid Chowdhury, Bangladeshi publisher

=== 2017 ===
- PEN Pinter Prize: Michael Longley
- International Writer of Courage Award: Mahvash Sabet, Iranian poet and teacher

=== 2018 ===
- PEN Pinter Prize: Chimamanda Ngozi Adichie
- International Writer of Courage: Waleed Abulkhair, Saudi lawyer and human rights activist

=== 2019 ===
- PEN Pinter Prize: Lemn Sissay
- International Writer of Courage Award: Befeqadu Hailu, Ethiopian writer and blogger

=== 2020 ===
- PEN Pinter Prize: Linton Kwesi Johnson
- International Writer of Courage Award: Amanuel Asrat, Eritrean poet

=== 2021 ===
- PEN Pinter Prize: Tsitsi Dangarembga
- International Writer of Courage Award: Kakwenza Rukirabashaija, Ugandan novelist

=== 2022 ===
- PEN Pinter Prize: Malorie Blackman
- International Writer of Courage Award: Abduljalil al-Singace

=== 2023 ===
- PEN Pinter Prize: Michael Rosen
- International Writer of Courage Award: Rahile Dawut, Uyghur imprisoned academic

=== 2024 ===
- PEN Pinter Prize: Arundhati Roy
- International Writer of Courage Award: Alaa Abd El-Fattah, British-Egyptian writer and activist

=== 2025 ===
- PEN Pinter Prize: Leila Aboulela

== See also ==
- Prison literature
