= Cheers to You, Nation =

Syrian radio and theatre play

Cheers to You, Nation (Arabic: كاسك يا وطن) pronounced "Kasak Ya Watan" is a Syrian, sociopolitical tragicomic play performed in 1978. Starring the famous Arab actor Duraid Lahham, it is considered one of the most famous Arabic-language plays, and been played and broadcast in different Arabic states. The play was written by Muhammad al-Maghut and directed by Khaldoun al-Malehh.

== Characters ==
- Ghawar: Father of Ahlam and the main character of the story. Ghawar was a character in Maghut's play October Village (1974) who died.
- Ahlam: daughter of Ghawar, who died in hospital because of careless staff
- Radiyeh: Ghawar's wife
- The presenter: the only presenter of the radio

Many other characters make short appearances.

== Actors ==
- Duraid Lahham: Ghawar
- Omar Hajjo
- Hala shawkat
- Sabah Al-Jazza'iri: the presenter
- Shaker Brikhan
- Suzan Fakhri: Radiyeh
- Hiyam To'eme
- Hussam Tahhsin Bek
- Samir Hhelmi
- Salma Al-Masri
- Omar Badrakhat

== Plot ==
The play is a reproduction of a radio broadcasting, from the RAC (Radio Arab Carlo), a parody of the popular Radio MonteCarlo at the time. The main show on the radio is Ahlam (Arabic for "Dreams"), which is also the name of one of the characters. In this program, Ghawar tries to do his best to provide his child Ahlam with the best of everything, but everything goes wrong because of bureaucracy and corruption. After checking the hospital months before the birth for ambulance and food and room, his wife ends giving birth at home because there is no fuel for the ambulance that day.

Ghawar, who is a son of a martyr and carries his decoration all the time, has great faith in the government's efforts to reduce poverty and unemployment, and dreams of a bright future for his daughter. But all this goes away when months later his daughter dies because the doctor let her wait while receive a more important patient.

Ghawar's quest to justice takes him through different adventures including prison. By the end of the play, he sells his other three children and, abandoned by his wife, he becomes an alcoholic.

The last episode of the program include a conversation between Ghawar and his dead father, who assume that 40 years after his sacrifice, Arab lands are united again and Palestine is returned to its people, but Ghawar, who first manages his father's feelings, is unable to withhold truth any longer and tell the shameful state of the Arabian countries to his father, who feels that he died for nothing.

The program is interrupted by different songs and advertisement on the so-called RAC, each of them criticizing the state of the Arabs in the late 1970s, including arts, politics, and social issues.
