= Faraj Bayrakdar =

Syrian poet and former political prisoner, born 1951

- فرج بيرقدار
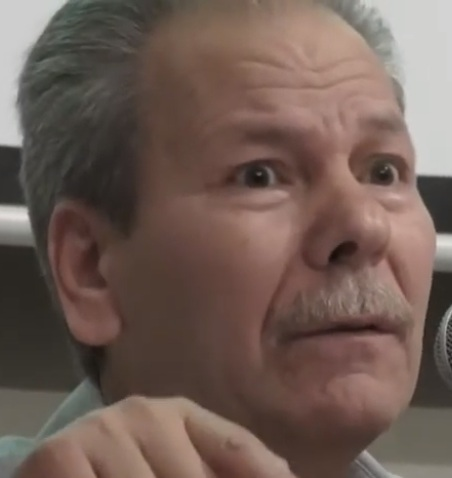
- Faraj Bayrakdar in 2017
- Born: 1951 (age 74–75) near Homs, Syria
- Occupations: poet, writer
- Years active: 1979 to present
- Notable work: A Dove in Free Flight, poetry collection

Faraj Bayrakdar (Arabic: فرج بيرقدار, romanized: Faraj Bayraqdār; born 1951 in Tir Maaleh near Homs, Syria) is a Swedish-Syrian poet and writer. He was a political prisoner in his home country for almost 14 years. After an international campaign for his release and a presidential amnesty in 2000, he went into exile in Sweden in 2005. He is best known for his poetry collection A Dove in Free Flight, that was published without the author's knowledge while still in a Syrian prison. These poems were first published in Arabic and later translated into French and English. His work is part of contemporary Syrian prison literature.

== Biography ==
Bayrakdar began writing poetry during his school years and started a short-lived literary magazine with his friends while studying Arabic literature at Damascus University. He was arrested twice in connection with his work on the magazine, but was soon released again. He made his debut as a poet with the 1979 poetry collection wa-mā anta waḥdaka (You Are Not Alone). Since then, nine collections of his Arabic poetry have been published.

=== Imprisonment ===
In the early 1980s, Bayrakdar became active in the Syrian Communist Party, and on March 31, 1987, he was arrested again, this time because he was suspected of being a member of the banned Labour Communist Party. He was imprisoned without trial for almost seven years, tortured by the security police and denied medical care. It was not until 1993 that he was charged with belonging to an "unlawful political society", and on 17 October 1993, he was sentenced to 15 years in prison. His wife was also imprisoned as a member of the Communist Party for four years.

During his years in captivity, Bayrakdar was imprisoned in three different prisons, but still managed to secretly write poems on cigarette paper. The poems had been secretly smuggled out of the prison and published collectively in Beirut by the New York Translation Collective without the author's knowledge. They were first published in Arabic in 2002 and later translated into English as A Dove in Free Flight. The Lebanese writer Elias Khoury wrote an introductory essay, calling this collection "one of the instruments of pressure on the Syrian authorities to mobilize international, intellectual opinion, particularly in France, in order to set the poet free." The main theme of the poems was his fear of abandonment and being forgotten, which brought him worldwide attention: in 1998 he was one of the political prisoners awarded the Human Rights Watch's Hellman-Hammett Award, and in 1999 he received the PEN International Freedom to Write Award.

=== Release ===
After an international campaign for his release, he was released on 16 November 2000 under an amnesty issued by Syrian president Bashar al-Assad. By then, Bayrakdar had served close to 14 of the 15 years he was sentenced to. On November 28, 2000, he published a text in which he thanked those who supported him and announced his plans for the future: "After writing so much to death, I would now like to write to her sister, life."

=== Life in Sweden ===
Since 2005 Bayrakdar has lived in Sweden, where he was hosted by the Stockholm City of Refuge programme.

== Reception ==
A Dove in Free Flight, only published in English nineteen years later, was first translated into French in 2012 by the Moroccan poet Abdellatif Laabi, also a former political prisoner in his home country. His collection Mirrors of Absence was translated and published in Italian, German, Swedish and Slovenian.

Inspired by Schubert's Winterreise, Swedish composer Svante Henryson set several of Bayrakdar's poems to music. Performances of this work were staged at theaters in Sweden in autumn 2017.

== Awards ==
- 1998 – Hellman-Hammett Award
- 1999 – Freedom to Write Award
- 2004 – Oxfam Novib/PEN Award
- 2007 – Tucholsky Prize

== Poetry collections ==
- Mirrors of Absence. (2015) Translated by John Asfour, Toronto: Guernica, ISBN 9781550719727.
- Alcalay, Ammiel; Taleghani, Shareah, eds. (2021). A Dove in Free Flight. Upset Press. ISBN 978-1-937357-00-9.

== See also ==
- Modern Arabic poetry
- Syrian literature - Modern poetry
