= Muhammad al-Maghut =

Syrian writer (1934–2006)

- محمد الماغوط
- Born: 12 December 1934; Salamiyah, Syria
- Died: 3 April 2006 (aged 71); Damascus, Syria
- Occupations: poet, playwright, columnist
- Spouse: Saniya Salih
- Writing career
- Language: Arabic
- Period: 1955-2006
- Genres: poetry, theatre plays movie scenarios, essays
- Notable works: A Room with Millions of Walls, October Village; I will betray my homeland, The Borders, The Report
- Notable awards: Order of Civil Merit of the Syrian Arab Republic, 2005
- Movement: Modern Arabic literature

Muhammad al-Maghut, also written Mohammad Al-Maghout, (Arabic: محمد الماغوط; 12 December 1934 – 3 April 2006) was a Syrian poet, writer for the theatre and movies, columnist and satirist. His works include six books of poetry, prose, plays and film scripts in Arabic. His poems have been translated into various languages, including English, French, Spanish and German.

Al-Maghut is considered one of the founders of prose poetry in modern Arabic literature and is one of the best-known authors of 20-th century Syrian literature. He expressed the experience of political oppression in poetic and accessible language.

== Live and career ==
=== Early years ===
Al-Maghut was born in 1934 in Salamiyya, in the Hama Governorate, into an Ismaili family. The son of a farmer, he grew up in poverty. After completing his primary education in Salamiyya, he moved to Damascus at the age of 14 and attended a boarding school to prepare for a career in agriculture.

During a nine-month imprisonment in 1955 for his membership of the Syrian Social Nationalist Party (SSNP), al-Maghut began writing socially critical poems on cigarette paper. Having received no higher education, his literary career was largely self-taught. Al-Maghut fled to Lebanon in the late 1950s and joined the influential literary group Shi'r, known among others by the Syrian poet Adonis. It was there that he met his future wife, the poet Saniya Salih. Already then, he was regarded as an unconventional innovator of prose poetry.

=== Literary career ===
Al-Maghut revitalised Arabic poetry by breaking with traditional forms and employing colloquial language – at times with an absurd sense of humour. He is regarded as one of the founders of free Arabic prose poetry, and his poems are characterised by an accessible, often satirical language that combines existential experiences with political criticism. Central themes of his poetry include political oppression and alienation, isolation and fear, exile and the individual’s experience within an authoritarian state. Al-Maghut understood his role as a poet as follows: "[...] the daily blotting paper that dries the thousands of bloody pages in our everyday lives." Well-known collections of his poetry include Huzn fi daw al-qamar (Sadness in the Moonlight), Ghurfa bi-milyun judran (A Room with a Million Walls) and Al-farah laysa mihnati (Joy Is Not My Profession).

In addition to his poetry, al-Maghut wrote for the theatre, television and cinema. His plays and screenplays combine satire with criticism of social deprivation, authoritarian regimes and moral decay in the Arab world. He drew on his vivid imagination, his eloquence and his satirical imagination to craft his dramatic works. His first theatre production, Al-ousfour al ahdab (The Hunchbacked Bird), was originally a long poem he wrote while hiding in a small room with a low ceiling. The poem developed into a dialogue and was later performed in the theatre. This was followed by the play al-Muharej (The Clown), in which a troupe of down-and-out actors attempt to perform Shakespeare’s Othello in a café. In the 1970s and 1980s, Al-Maghut collaborated with the renowned Syrian actors Duraid Lahham and Nehad Qalei, creating some of the region’s most popular plays and television films, including Kasak ya Watan (A Toast to the Fatherland), Ghorbeh (Alienation) and Dayat Tishreen (The Village in October).

=== Journalism and relation with the government ===
Al-Maghut enjoyed a good personal relationship with President Hafez al-Assad, which meant he was able to criticise poverty, corruption, the powerlessness of the Arab states and the tragedies in Palestine and Lebanon without censorship, though without making direct reference to Syria. As a journalist, al-Maghut worked for the official government newspaper Tishreen (October), writing a daily column from 1975 onwards in rotation with another writer. For the Paris-based Lebanese weekly Al-Mustaqbal (The Future), he wrote the column Alīs fi balad al-ajaʿb (Alice in Wonderland). In 2005, al-Maghut was awarded the Syrian Order of Merit by Bashar al-Assad.

=== Private life and death ===
Al-Maghut and his wife Saniya Saleh, who died in 1995 at the age of 56, had two daughters. In April 2006, Al-Maghut died in Damascus at the age of 72. The Syrian news agency commented on his death, saying, “Syria and the Arab world have lost a giant [of Arab literature].”

== Selected works ==
In 1998, the Damascus-based publishing house Dar al-Mada published a complete edition of his works published up to that point, comprising just under 600 pages.

=== Poetry ===
- Huzn fi daw’a al-qamar (Sadness in the moonlight), Beirut: Dar Majallat Shiʿr, 1959.
- Gurfa bi malayin al-judrán (A room with millions of walls), Damascus: Muʾassasat al-Nuri, 1961.
- Al-farah laysa mihnati (Joy is not my profession), 1970.
- Sayaf al-zohour (The rose slayer), 2001.
- Sharq Adan, Gharb alaah (East of Eden, West of God), 2005.
- Al-badawi al-ahmar (The Red Bedouin), 2006.
- Al-aʿmāl aš-šiʿrīya (The Poetic Works), Dar al-Mada, Damascus, 2013.

=== Prose ===
- Sa akhoun watani (I will betray my homeland), 1987. Essays
- Ightisāb kāna wa akhawāteha (The rape of "Kāna" and her sisters), Damascus: Dar al-Balad, 2002. Interviews

=== Theatre ===
- Al-ousfour al ahdab (The hunchback bird), 1967.
- Al-muharij (The Clown), 1973.
- Da'yat Tishrin (October Village), 1973.
- Ghorbeh (Exile), 1975.
- Kasak ya watan (Cheers to you, Nation), 1978.
- Shaqaeq al-nomaan (Poppies), 1989.
- Kharej al-sareb (Outside the flock), 1999.

=== TV ===
- Hakaya al-layl (The night tales)
- Wayn al-ghalat (Where is the mistake)
- Wadi al-misk (The musk valley)

=== Movies ===
- Al-hudood (The borders), 1984.
- Al-taqreer (The report), 1987.

=== Translations ===
- Joy is not My Profession, translated by John Asfour and Alison Burch, Signal Editions, Montreal, 1994
- A Fan of Swords: Poems, edited by Salma Khadra Jayyusi, Three Continents Press, Washington D.C., 1991

Bilingual edition in German:

- Muḥammad al- Māġūṭ (2021). Khalid al-Maaly (ed.). Geht auf Zehenspitzen, denn die Heimat liegt im Sterben! / Wasīrū ʿalā ruʾūs aqdāmikum fālwaṭan yuḥtaḍar!. Berlin/Tübingen: Schiler & Mücke. ISBN 978-3-89930-386-5.

== Awards ==
- 2005: Order of Civil Merit of the Syrian Arab Republic (Excellence Class)
- 2005: Prize for Poetry – Al Owais Award, administered by the Sultan Bin Ali Al Owais Cultural Foundation.
- 2000: Medal of the Experimental Theater – Cairo.
- 1973: Said Akl Prize for Theater.
- 1950: Prize For Poetry – An-Nahar Newspaper.

== Reception ==
Al-Maghut’s work has attracted attention both in the Arab world and internationally. His poems have been translated into several languages, including English, French, Spanish, Swedish and German. One of his poems was set to music in 1977 as a song by the Israeli composer Tsippi Fleischer, with the English title ‘Girl butterfly girl’.

According to the German Arabist and translator of al-Maghut's poetry Stephan Milich, he is regarded as a key figure of Arabic prose poetry, alongside Syrian poet and cultural theorist Adonis. Milich wrote the following comments in his afterword to an anthology in German: "His poems, published in Syria and Lebanon in the late 1950s, were at the centre of heated debates surrounding the prose poem (qaṣīdat an-naṯr), as many recognised in them the most radical and convincing attempt at Arabic prose poetry to date. With his first three volumes of poetry, he quickly rose to become one of the best-known modernist Arab poets, and with the numerous plays, screenplays for film and television, socio-political columns and satirical commentaries he wrote from the 1970s onwards, al-Maghut was soon celebrated as one of the most prominent exponents of political satire."

In his PhD-thesis The New Austerity in Syrian Poetry, literary scholar Daniel Behar examined modern Arabic poetry, using the works of Syrian poets as case studies. In this context, Behar described al-Maghut’s poetic work as one of the "central voices". A particular emphasis was given to al-Maghut’s ability to express the experience of political oppression in a language that is both poetic and accessible. By bringing literary Arabic closer to Syrian colloquial speech, al-Maghut created, according to Behar, "sincere" literature, that expresses ‘"a matter of people and places".

== See also ==
- Arabic literature
- Syrian literature
