= 2013 Mogadishu Turkish embassy attack =

Terrorist Attack

- Part of Somali Civil War (2009–present)
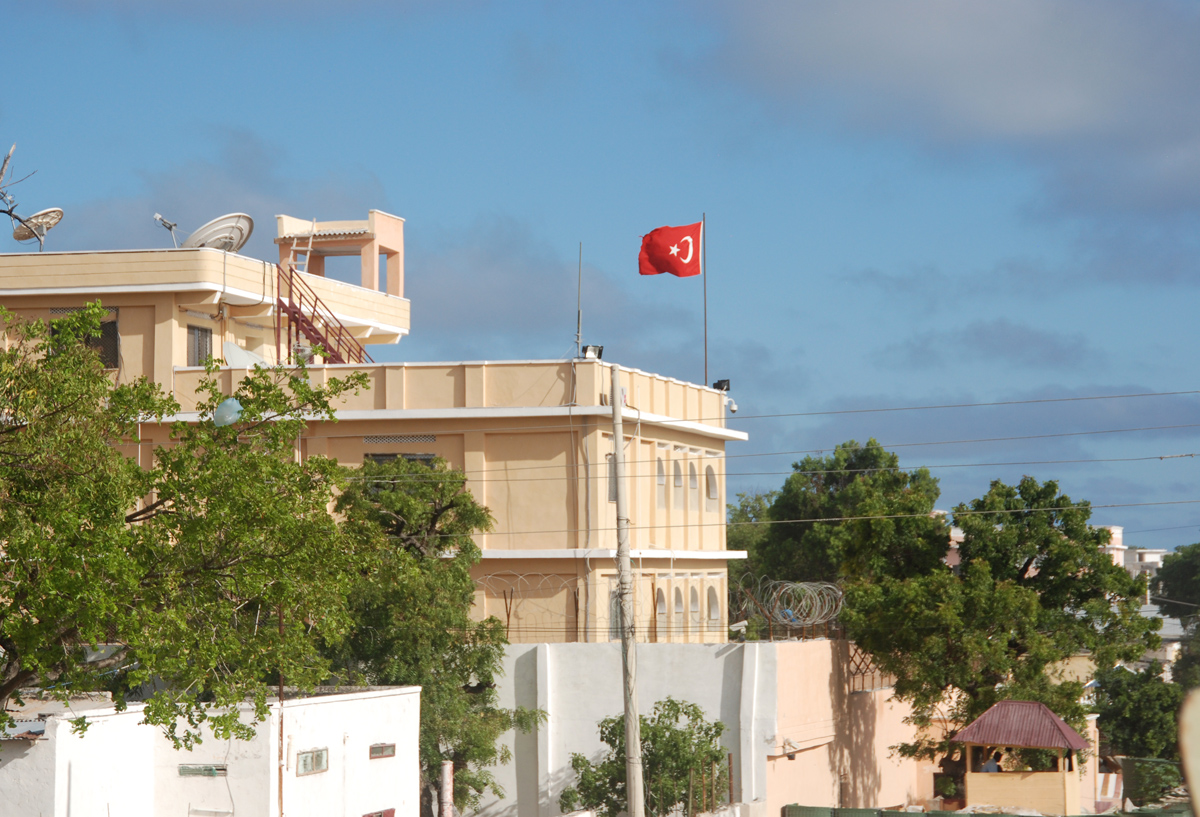
- Turkish embassy in Mogadishu
- Location: 2°02′11.0″N 45°21′16.8″E
- Date: 27 July 2013
- Target: Turkish embassy
- Weapon: Suicide car bomb
- Deaths: 6 (including 3 attackers)
- Injuries: 9
- Perpetrator: Al-Shabaab

The 2013 Mogadishu Turkish embassy attack occurred on 27 July 2013 when al-Shaabab militants attacked the Turkish embassy in the Somali capital of Mogadishu, killing 3 people and injuring 9 others. At around 5:00 p.m. a minivan rigged with explosives detonated near the embassy compound. The explosion was followed by three armed militants attempting to storm the compound on foot, but they were repelled and killed by Turkish and Somali security guards.

Al-Shabaab claimed responsibility for the attack in a statement. saying “Mujahideen forces in Mogadishu have just carried out an operation targeting a group of Turkish diplomats in Hodan district.” The U.S. State Department labeled the attack a "cowardly act" while the United Nations Security Council released a statement condemning it in "strongest terms."

== See also ==
- June 2013 Mogadishu attack
- 2009 African Union base bombings in Mogadishu
- 2015 Ministry of Higher Education attack
