= Ashraf Fayadh =

Palestinian artist, art curator and lyricist

- أشرف فياض
- Born: 1980 (age 45–46); Saudi Arabia
- Occupations: Artist and poet
- Criminal charges: apostasy
- Criminal penalty: Beheading (original sentence; 2015; commuted); Eight-year prison term with 800 lashes (subsequent replacement sentence)
- Awards: Oxfam Novib/PEN Award for Freedom of Expression (2017)

Ashraf Fayadh (Arabic: أشرف فياض; born 1980 in Saudi Arabia) is an artist and poet of Palestinian origin. He is the son of refugees from Khan Yunis in the Gaza Strip and lives in Saudi Arabia. He was active in the British-Arabian arts organization, Edge of Arabia, and organized exhibitions of Saudi art in Europe and Saudi Arabia.

In November 2015, he was sentenced to death by beheading for apostasy. The Saudi court overturned the death sentence three months later, imposing an eight-year prison term with 800 lashes.

== Conviction for apostasy ==
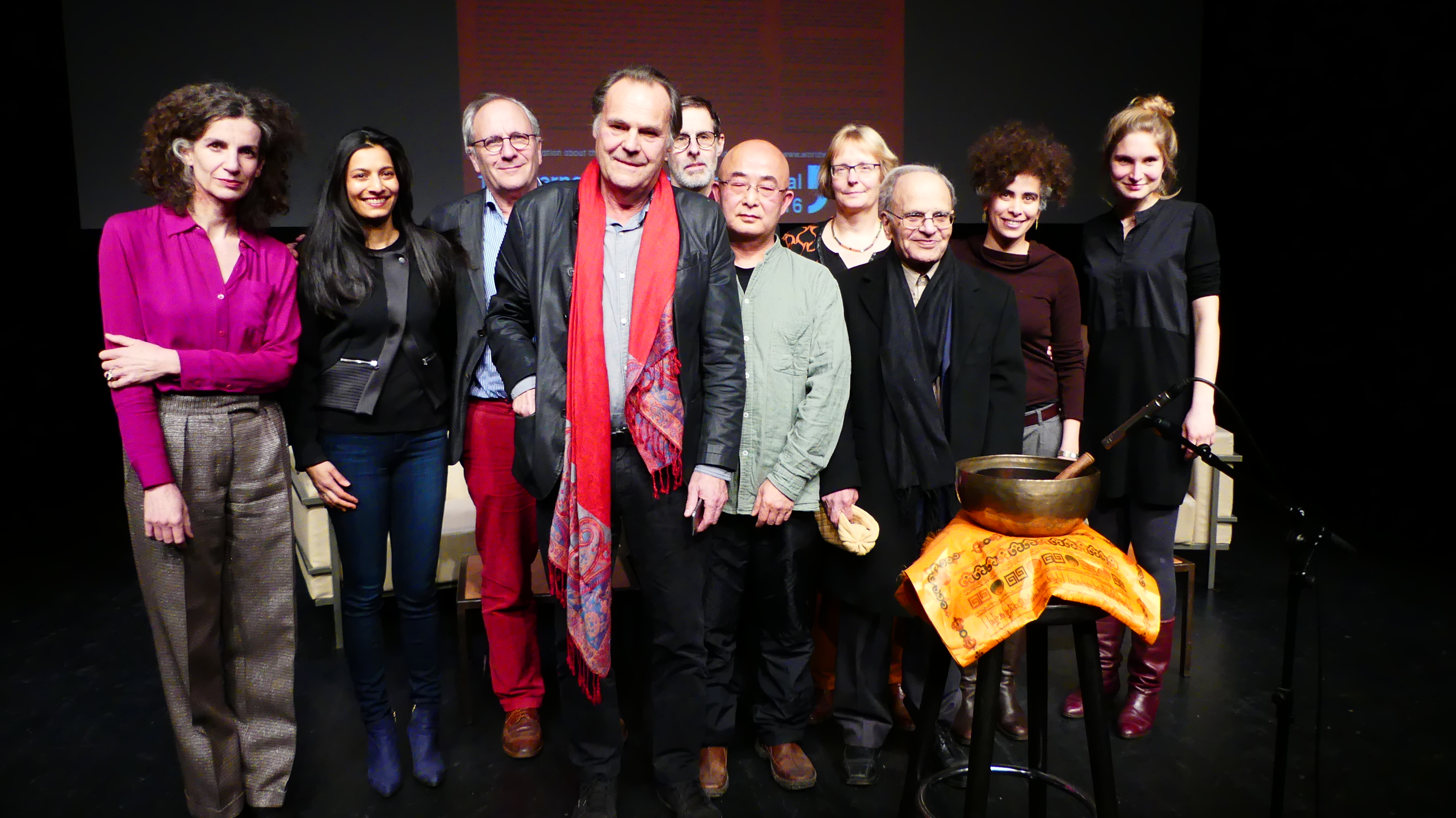
Worldwide Reading for Ashraf Fayadh on 14 January 2016

After an argument at a café, Fayadh was detained by religious police in Abha, Saudi Arabia, released on bail, then rearrested and tried in early 2014. He was sentenced to four years in prison and 800 lashes. A Saudi appeals court returned the case to the lower court where a new judge was assigned to the case.

On 17 November 2015, Fayadh was sentenced to death by beheading for apostasy. Evidence included several poems within his 2008 book Instructions Within, Twitter posts, and conversations Fayadh had in an Abha coffee shop, in which he was accused of having promoted atheism.

In December 2015, Fayadh became Honorary Member of German PEN, combined with a new protest note. In November 2015, the Berlin International Literature Festival published an appeal to support Ashraf Fayadh with a Worldwide Reading on 14 January 2016. Adam Coogle, a Middle East researcher for Human Rights Watch, said Fayadh's death sentence showed Saudi Arabia's "complete intolerance of anyone who may not share government-mandated religious, political and social views."

Following the international outcry, Fayadh's death sentence was commuted to eight years in prison and 800 lashes. Fayadh was also required to repent through an announcement in official media.

In January 2017, Fayadh shared the Oxfam Novib/PEN Award for Freedom of Expression with Malini Subramaniam.

On August 23, 2022, Fayadh was released from prison after eight years and eight months.

== See also ==
- Apostasy in Islam
