= Razan Naiem Almoghrabi =

Libyan writer and feminist

Razan Naiem Almoghrabi (Arabic: رزان نعيم المغربي), also seen as Razan Naim Moghrabi, is a Libyan writer and feminist.

== Education ==
Razan Naiem Almoghrabi studied accountancy before turning to a literary career.

== Career ==
Almoghrabi has been publishing her work in Libyan newspapers since 1991 and was managing editor for a cultural magazine called Horizons. Her published works include several collections of short stories, among themIn Exile and Horses Devour the Sea (2002), Texts with a Lost Signature (2006), An In-between Man (2010), and Soul for Sale (2010); two novels (Migration to the Tropic of Capricorn in 2004 and Women of Wind in 2010) and one volume of poetry.

Her novel Women of Wind (Nisa al rih), in which a Moroccan servant in Tripoli seeks a smuggler to arrange her passage to Europe, was longlisted for the Arabic Booker Prize (International Prize for Arabic Fiction) in 2011. In 2015, Almoghrabi was recognized with an Oxfam Novib/PEN Award for her efforts at freedom for writers and journalists in Libya.

Almoghrabi organized Tripoli's first women's rights conference in 2012, and signed a Statement of Solidarity with the women of Syria, at the Forum on Women’s Rights, Peace and Security in Istanbul. In 2013, she spoke before the United Nations Commission on the Status of Women about women's rights in Libya. Her public feminism, including her choice not to wear a veil, has made her the target of death threats and religious violence; in 2013 the entrance to her home was shot at by several members of the militia.
