= Dareen Tatour =

Palestinian Israeli poet, photographer and activist

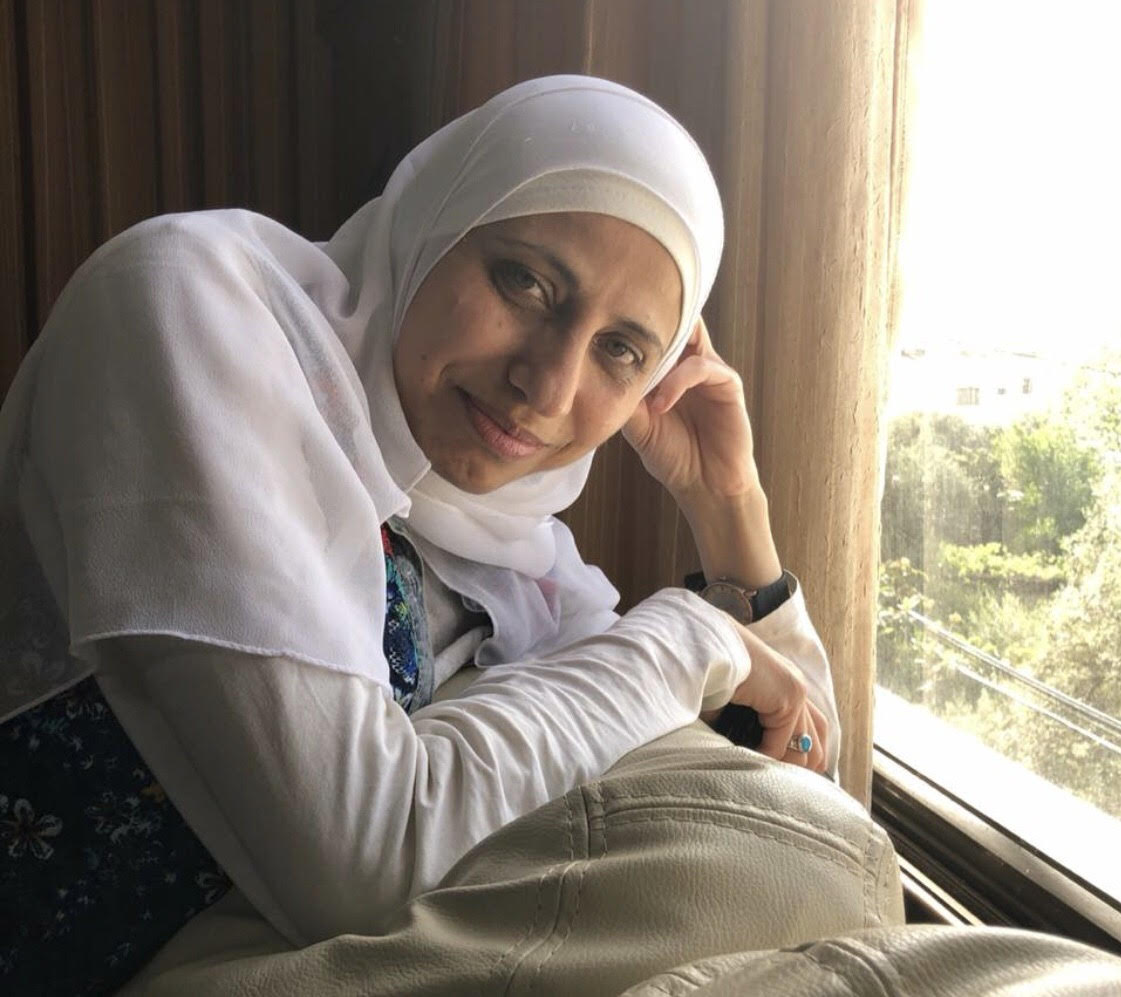
Dareen Tatour

Dareen Tatour (Arabic: دارين طاطور, romanized: Dārīn Ṭāṭūr; born 16 April 1982 in Reineh) is a Palestinian poet, photographer, and social media activist from Reineh, Israel, who writes in Arabic, her mother tongue. She was tried, convicted, and sentenced to five months in prison by an Israeli court in 2018 for "inciting violence" and "supporting a terrorist organisation" in postings on social media, one of which was a video that included a reading of her poem. Following her appeal, the conviction for the post containing the poem was overturned the following year, but the conviction for her other posts was upheld.

In 2019, she received an Oxfam Novib/PEN Award for Freedom of Expression.

== Social media posts and arrest ==
She has published her work on Facebook, and YouTube.

In October 2015, Tatour published a poem on YouTube and Facebook titled "Qawem Ya Shaabi Qawemahum" ("Resist my people, resist them"), where the words were cited as the soundtrack to images of Palestinians in violent confrontations with Israeli troops. This led to her arrest and indictment for incitement to violence and for support of a terrorist organization. A full translation of the poem as made by a police officer is cited in the indictment document. The rest of the indictment relates to three Facebook publications: (i) the picture of Israa Abed, a woman from Nazareth, laid on the ground of the central bus station in Afula after she was shot by Israeli soldiers and guards; (ii) a profile picture with the Arabic writing "Ana Al-Shahid Al-Jay" ("I am the next martyr"); and (iii) a post citing the call by Islamic Jihad for Intifada in the West Bank and calling for Intifada inside the green line for Al-Aqsa.

=== Reactions ===
Tatour's poem was viewed more than 200,000 times before her trial.

The posts coincided with the so-called "Knife Intifada", a wave of daily Palestinian stabbings which had begun in 2015, had killed dozens of Israelis in a matter of months, and had been widely attributed to social-media encouragement. Israeli investigators asserted that: "The content, its exposure and the circumstances of its publication created a real possibility that acts of violence or terrorism will be committed."

At the same time, Tatour's prosecution elicited widespread international condemnation. According to the BBC, by 2018 "the poet's case has become a cause celebre for free speech advocates and has drawn attention to a recent rise in Israeli arrests - of Israeli Arabs and Palestinians in the occupied West Bank - accused of incitement or planning attacks online" The PEN American Center condemned her arrest and sentencing in 2016, organized letter-writing campaigns on her behalf, and following her conviction in May 2018 stated that the conviction “relies on a wanton mischaracterization of her work and is an unacceptable attack on freedom of expression in Israel”. Her arrest was also condemned by the American anti-Zionist organization Jewish Voice for Peace.

== Trial, sentence and successful appeal ==
Tatour initially denied authoring the posts and poem, but after switching attorneys she admitted to having done so, and instead began claiming the poem had been mistranslated.

The prosecution's argument emphasized her denial, reversal, and subsequent blaming of others, asserting that a person "confident of the justice of his path and purity of his intentions consistently admits to publishing the things attributed to him, and explains the underlying intentions."

Tatour's defense argued that she was being tried to "intimidate and silence Palestinians in Israel" and that "criminalization of poetry… derogates from the cultural richness of all society."

She was convicted on May 3, 2018, and on 31 July 2018 sentenced to five months' imprisonment. She was released in September, 2018.

In May 2019, the Nazareth District Court overturned her conviction for the poem, though not the convictions for other social media posts. The court ruled that the poem did not "involve unequivocal remarks that would provide the basis for a direct call to carry out acts". The court noted that Tatour was known as a poet and that "freedom of expression is accorded added weight when it also involves freedom of artistic and creative [expression]".
