= Death of Yunus Emre Göçer =

2023 death in Istanbul, Turkey

- Part of Controversies of Hassan Sheikh Mohamud
- Date: 30 November 2023; 2 years ago
- Location: Kennedy Avenue, Fatih, Istanbul, Turkey
- Cause: Traffic collision
- Deaths: Yunus Emre Göçer
- Convicted: Mohamed Hassan Sheikh Mohamud
- Charges: Negligent homicide (TPC, Art. 85)
- Convictions: $900 (fined)
- Sentence: The court initially sentenced him to two-and-a-half years in prison, but converted this to a fine

On November 30, 2023, Mohamed Hassan Sheikh Mohamud, the son of the President of Somalia Hassan Sheikh Mohamud, hit Yunus Emre Göçer, a motorcycle courier, on the Kennedy Avenue highway, causing his death. The release of Mohamud after the accident caused outrage in Turkey.

== Incident ==
On November 30, 2023, motorcyclist Yunus Emre Göçer was rear-ended by a car after he stopped his motorcycle in the right lane while driving in traffic at the Aksaray exit of the Eurasia Tunnel in Istanbul. Göçer was found seriously wounded by the medical teams arriving at the scene, He was taken to Samatya Training and Research Hospital and taken under treatment. According to the traffic accident footage, the car involved in the accident was a consular vehicle. The driver was identified as Mohamed Hassan Sheikh Mohamud, a Somali diplomat and son of Somali President Hassan Sheikh Mohamud. According to the lawyer of Göçer's family, according to the accident report prepared by the traffic police, no fault was stated for the driver and Mohamud was released after his statement was taken at the police station. The police told Emre Göçer's family that the incident was a suicide when the incident first occurred and until the records emerged.

On December 6, 2023, Göçer died in the hospital where he was being treated in intensive care.

=== Aftermath ===
After the accident, the son of the Somali President was detained by the police. After a short period of detention, Mohamud was released, and a travel ban was imposed on him. Following the incident, Mohamud was determined to be primarily at fault and an arrest warrant was issued for him. On December 8, 2023, police went to Mohamud's home to detain him. Mohamud could not be caught because he had gone abroad on December 2, 2023. Upon this, Göçer`s wife said, "The son of president [Mohamud] was able to escape under immunity armor because the police kept an incorrect report. The authorities say they will do what is necessary, but I cannot believe what they say."

Turkish Minister of Justice Yılmaz Tunç interrupted a journalist's question about Mohamud's escape from the country on December 10, saying, "The agenda is Palestine... Look, the agenda is Palestine... OK?" When journalists tried to ask the question for the second time, he said, "The agenda is Palestine, my friend... Look at my friend Palestine." He did not answer the questions again. The incident caused great reactions on social and mainstream media.

On December 10, 2023, hundreds of motorcycle drivers gathered in front of Çağlayan Courthouse to express a demand for justice for Göçer, and organized a protest march starting from Zincirlikuyu metrobus bridge. Couriers criticized the escape and release of Mohamud and called for "Justice for Yunus" with slogans and banners. In his speech in front of the courthouse, a motorcycle courier said, "We are here today for justice for Yunus. We do not want to die anymore. We have families waiting at our homes. We are calling out to the authorities; we do not want to die."

The family's lawyer, Iyaz Çimen, criticized the way the case was handled by the justice system and emphasized the need for transparency in the process. Republican People's Party Istanbul Provincial Chairman Çelik described the incident as "not a traffic accident but a murder" and called on the authorities.

Öznur Göçer: “I have a 15-year-old daughter who is a high school student. I have an 8-year-old child with autism. My child was excluded from his social life because he was sick. My husband and I were working tooth and nail to rehabilitate him. Now we are left alone," she said.

According to Kanal D News, Mohamud said in his statement at the police station, "He suddenly hit the brakes without signaling. He made a right turn. [Göçer] was not wearing a helmet. I pressed the brakes but could not stop." However, in a video, Göçer was driving in his own lane, while Mohamud did not slow down without applying the brakes. Mohamud accused Göçer of trying to turn back on the road of no return. Göçer, a father of two children, was reportedly not turning in the footage. According to the expert report, it was concluded that Mohamud was at fault.

== Investigation ==
It was determined that Mohamud, who fled after the incident, was released after the statement procedures at the police station because "the motor courier was shown at fault" in the police report, but was found to be "primarily at fault" in the expert report prepared. Although the Istanbul Chief Public Prosecutor's Office issued an arrest warrant for Mohamud, he fled abroad on 2 December 2023.

Öznur Göçer, the wife of motorcyclist Yunus Emre Göçer, said in a statement to Cumhuriyet newspaper, "The authorities say that the necessary will be done, but I cannot be convinced by these statements." Stating that the authorities questioned whether Göçer was a novice after the accident, Öznur Göçer said, "The police told us that my husband committed suicide until the footage came out. If my husband's motorcyclist friends and the public did not show pressure, maybe they would have said that my husband committed suicide and closed the incident."

On November 30, 2023, an investigation was launched against the police officers involved in the accident.

The Istanbul Chief Public Prosecutor's Office launched an ex officio investigation into the allegations on social media and the law enforcement officers who issued a "no fault" report on the incident. The Chief Public Prosecutor's Office stated the following in its statement:

On November 30, 2023, motorcycle driver Yunus Emre Göçer was injured and subsequently died on December 6, 2023. An investigation was initiated ex officio regarding the law enforcement officers who made the first determinations regarding the fault and gave a fault report and the allegations on social media that the police officers called the deceased's wife and told her that he had committed suicide.

Minister of Justice Yılmaz Tunç stated that they were waiting for a final report from the Forensic Medicine Institution following the second report received. Emphasizing that everyone is equal before the law, Tunç stated that all processes, including international procedures, are being meticulously carried out to catch the suspect and that the investigation is being carried out in all aspects.

== Reactions ==
- On December 7, 2023, Minister of Justice Yılmaz Tunç, responded to journalists asking questions about the incident: "If there is a fault, regardless of the title, it will be followed up."
- On December 7, 2023, Ekrem İmamoğlu, the Mayor of Istanbul Metropolitan Municipality, stated on his X account that he would follow the death of Yunus Emre Göçer and reacted to the decision to release Mohamud. On December 8, 2023, he posted: "... the suspect left Turkey with his arms waving his arms. The pain of the victim's family has multiplied even more. Unfortunately, the mentality that condones and allows this escape means that it is incapable of defending the rights of its own citizens in its own country."
- On December 8, 2023, Democracy and Progress Party Istanbul MP Mustafa Yeneroğlu wrote on his social media account, "In a state of law, everyone is equal before the law. But in Turkey, this promise only applies to our 'ordinary' citizens." Emphasizing that Mohamud caused the death of Yunus Emre Göçer, who was working as a courier, and left Turkey despite being found to be at fault in the accident, the statement said: "I wish God's mercy to our brother Yunus Emre and patience to his family and friends."
- On December 10, 2023, CHP Istanbul Provincial Chairman Özgür Çelik stated that they "will not let go of the unlawfulness shown to Yunus Emre Göçer, a son of the motherland who was killed by the fugitive son of the President of Somalia and who led an honorable life and raised two children". "Every step of this disgrace, It is nothing but the oppression of tyrants who are disconnected from the people". Çelik emphasized that "this persecution is an injustice to the minds, consciences, people and especially to the aggrieved Göçer family."
- On December 10, 2023, Democrat Party Istanbul MP Cemal Enginyurt, on his X account, stated that the fugitive son of the Somali President was a Turkish citizen and expressed his sorrow over the death of the motor courier. Enginyurt emphasized that the killer's escape will not solve the problems and those responsible should be arrested and demanded justice.
