= Sarah Mkhonza =

Swazi writer

- Born: 7 May 1957 (age 69)
- Education: PHD from Michigan state University
- Occupations: Writer, educator, women's rights activist and journalist
- Awards: Hammett Hellman Award Oxfam Novibo Award

Sarah Mkhonza (born Sarah Thembile Du Pont; 7 May 1957) is a Swazi writer, educator and women's rights activist living in the United States.

Mkhonza received a PhD from Michigan State University. She worked as a journalist for the Times of Swaziland and The Swazi Observer and taught English and Linguistics at the University of Swaziland. Because her writing was critical of the authorities in Swaziland, she was ordered to stop writing. Subsequent threats and assaults led her to seek political asylum in the United States in 2005.

Mkhonza co-founded the Association of African Women and the African Book Fund Group at Michigan State University. She has taught at the Africana Studies and Research Center at Cornell University, at Boston University and at Stanford University.

In 2002, she received a Hammett-Hellman Award from Human Rights Watch. Mkhonza has also received an Oxfam Novib/PEN Award.

== Selected works ==
- What the Future Holds (1989)
- Pains of a Maid (1989)
- Two Stories (2007)
- Woman in a Tree (2008, poetry)
- Weeding the Flowerbeds (2008, memoir)
- Teaching English in Swaziland: Essays on the Life of Gordon James Thomas (2011)
- The Beadmakers (2015)
