= Sirous Asgari =

Iranian scientist

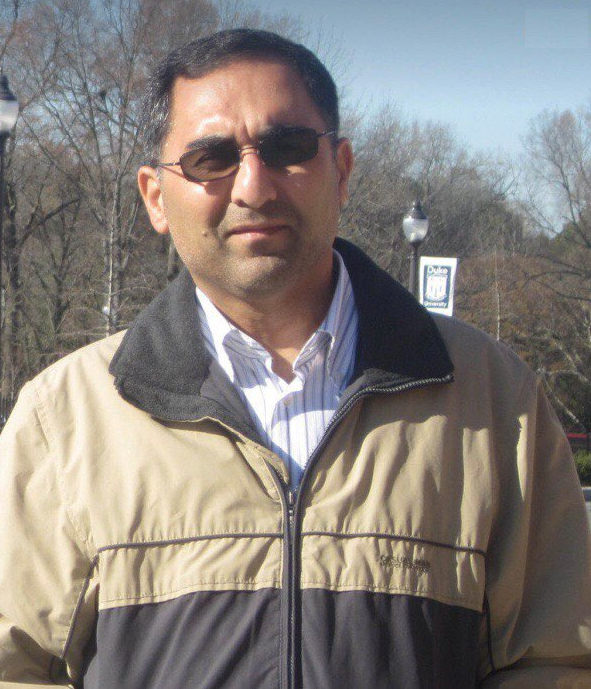
- Born: Sirous Asgari; 7 August 1960 (age 66); Masjed Soleyman, Iran

Academic background
- Education: University of Tehran; Drexel University
- Thesis: Structure and strain hardening of low stacking fault energy FCC alloys at large strains (1997)
- Doctoral advisor: Roger D. Doherty

Academic work
- Discipline: Material Science and Engineering
- Sub-discipline: High-performance components for Lithium Ion Batteries
- Institutions: Sharif University of Technology

Sirous Asgari (Persian: سیروس عسگری, born 7 August 1960) is an Iranian materials scientist and academic known for his research in lithium ion batteries, phase transformation and diffusion in solid materials. He is currently a full professor in the Department of Materials Science and Engineering at Sharif University of Technology, Iran.

According to a report by The New Yorker, Asgari was detained and charged in the United States after the Federal Bureau of Investigation (FBI) tried to recruit him as an informant and he refused the offer.

== Background and academic career ==
Asgari was born in Masjed Soleyman, Iran. He is a professor in the Department of Materials Science and Engineering, Sharif University of Technology, Iran. He received his Ph.D. in materials Science and Engineering (1997) at Drexel University. Prior to moving to the US, he obtained a MSc in Materials Science and Engineering from the Department of Metallurgical and Materials Engineering, University of Tehran in 1992. He then returned to Iran and became a Professor, Department of Engineering and Material Science, Sharif University of Technology where he taught Structure of Materials, Electronic Properties of Materials, Phase Transformations, Physical Metallurgy, Materials characterization Techniques, Diffusion in Solids and Advanced Materials. He is known for being an instructor with high impact teaching skills and his compendium for the course Physical Properties of Materials was said to be the best in the field among the material science students in Iran. While working at Sharif University, he kept in touch with American scientists and in 2011, 2012 and 2013 he visited American academic institutions. He was arrested in 2013 by the FBI on charges of stealing trade secrets, among others.

== Publication ==
Agari published tens of scholarly articles within materials science and engineering field in peer-reviewed journals cited over a thousand times by the technical community. A book he authored later became known as a standard text within the field. To gain control over the performance of novel energy conversion systems, Asgari extensively researched on heat treatment of materials in quest for tailored properties specifically for crystalline structures. In 1997 he suggested a novel strain hardening regime during large strain compression of low stacking fault energy Face-centered cubic alloys. Asgari together with colleagues formulated this hardening regime by microstructural evolution of the crystals and showed that such regime could lead to the formation of deformation twins, an observation that is instrumental in heat treatment of cubic center alloys.

== Legal case in the US ==
While working at the Case Western Reserve University in 2013 on a project paid for by the U.S. Navy Office of Naval Research, to create and produce anti-corrosive stainless steel through a heating process, Prof. Asgari was charged with stealing trade secrets, employment, and visa fraud and arrested by the FBI. He was then tried at a Federal Court where he was acquitted from all charges.

The Associated Press reported on 4 April 2018 that an FBI agent misled a magistrate judge to obtain a search warrant in a trade secrets case according to the federal judge. Sirous Asgari's emails cannot be used at trial because FBI agent Timothy Boggs "knowingly or recklessly made material omissions" in obtaining a search warrant for them in 2013, U.S. District Judge James Gwin ruled. However, later an appeals court (6th U.S. Circuit) ruled that the FBI agent did not significantly omit important information and was not misleading the legal system.

The FBI accused Asgari of being connected to the Iranian government due to a paper published by a PhD student at the same university but in a different campus. The judge, however, believed that “Connecting Asgari to the Iranian government because of this paper would be akin to connecting a chemistry professor at the Ohio State University’s Columbus campus to the American government because an astronomy graduate student at Ohio State’s Mansfield campus once did commercial telescope research that NASA could conceivably use”. The Federal judge, Mr. Gwin, also wrote that “mere employment as a professor at a state and privately supported university does not create probable cause”, and that Asgari's November 2012 visa application also stated his visit was, at least in part, for business reasons.

== Detention in the US ==
Although the US government lost its case charges (trade secret stealing and visa fraud), Immigration and Customs Enforcement (ICE) continued detaining him after the trial. Talking to The Guardian, he expressed an imminent fear for his life due to the spread of COVID-19 virus and no precautionary measures at ICE detention facility in Louisiana. In March 2020 ProPublica reported that in a 10-day span, ICE flew Asgari across the country nine times. He was allegedly shuttled from Louisiana to Texas, New Jersey and back on chartered flights full of migrants. Iran urged US to release Asgari after The Guardian's coverage. On a supplementary coverage, The Guardian reported on 4 April 2020 that Asgari and other detainees at the Winn Correctional Center in Louisiana expressed that ICE has isolated 44 of them together after they were possibly exposed to COVID-19.

=== COVID-19 contraction ===
On 28 April 2020, The Guardian reported that Prof. Asgari eventually contracted COVID-19 after pleading for release. ICE told Asgari’s lawyers he would only be released to a hospital if he was struggling to breathe.

=== Release ===
On 1 June 2020, Asgari was released and sent back to Iran. Immediately after, Iran permitted American prisoner Michael White, who had been convicted of "insulting the country’s top leader and posting a private photograph publicly" while traveling in Iran, to leave Mashhad prison for Switzerland.

== See also ==
- U.S. Immigration and Customs Enforcement
- Immigration detention
- Standard Minimum Rules for the Treatment of Prisoners
