= 2013 United Nations compound attack in Mogadishu =

Attack on an international organization compound

United Nations compound attack in Mogadishu
- Part of Somali Civil War (2009–present)
- 2013 United Nations compound attack in Mogadishu (Somalia) Mogadishu
- Location: Mogadishu, Somalia
- Date: 19 June 2013; 11:30 a.m. (EAT)
- Target: United Nations compound
- Attack type: Terrorist attack
- Deaths: 22 (including 7 attackers)
- Injuries: 20+
- Perpetrator: Al-Shabaab
- Motive: Islamic extremism

On 19 June 2013, al-Shabaab, a Somali jihadist organization, attacked a United Nations compound in Mogadishu using suicide bombers, and gunmen who stormed the compound on foot, killing 15 and injuring at least 20. According to the UN, a pickup truck filled with explosives detonated outside the main gate of the compound located near Aden Adde International Airport at 11:30 a.m., which was followed by several gunmen assailing the area on foot, engaging in a gunfight with Somali security forces that lasted an hour and a half. Numerous blasts could be heard as Somali troops fought with at least seven militants.

Four foreigners working for the United Nations Development Programme were killed in the assault, as well as numerous Somali security forces and civilians. Al-Shabaab claimed responsibility for the attack in a statement which called the UN a "merchant of death." It was the first attack on the UN since the organization relaunched its operations in the country.

== See also ==
- 2009 African Union base bombings in Mogadishu
- 2009 Beledweyne bombing
- 2015 Central Hotel attack
- 2008 Hargeisa–Bosaso bombings
