= Asieh Amini =

Iranian poet and journalist

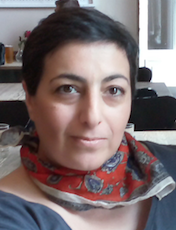
Amini in 2019

Asieh Amini (Persian: آسیه امینی; born 14 September 1973) is an Iranian poet and journalist currently residing in Trondheim, Norway. She is a women's rights activist fighting against the death penalty in general and specifically against the stoning of women and minors in Iran.

== Early life ==
Amini grew up in the Mazandaran Province in northern Iran. She was the third of four sisters. Her family originated from the gentry of feudal times. Her father was a teacher. She and her sisters spent a lot of time reading, writing and painting. She started visiting an afternoon poetry circle at a local library. Asieh wanted to become a painter or writer.

Amini's life changed after the Iranian Revolution. She hated the mandatory black hijab all girls had to wear and cried when she put it on. Her mother explained to her that it was a rule no one could disobey.

== Career ==
Amini started studying journalism at Tabataba'i University in Tehran in 1993. While still studying she started writing for newspapers. Later, she moved on to the larger newspaper Iran. When a colleague was supposed to interview a poet that Amini liked he took her along. The poet invited her into his writer's circle. The newspaper Iran started a youth supplement and Amini became the cultural editor. For these times in Iran, a woman being in such a senior position was unusual.

When Mohammad Khatami was elected president in 1997, the bans were lifted a little and more daring publications emerged. More women entered journalism. Amini took up a job at the newspaper Zan, which covered women's affairs. Although Amini opposed the idea of segregating news by gender, she took on the job. The newspaper Zan was banned. Subsequently, Amini took on freelancer work. After giving birth Amini started working as the social editor of the newspaper Etemaad. She also ran a website called Women in Iran.

After the presidential election in 2009, many journalists and activists were arrested and the situation in Iran became too dangerous for her. Amini decided to leave the country. Through a friend, she got the opportunity to become a guest writer within the ICORN network in Trondheim, Norway, from 2010 until 2012. She stayed in Norway and completed a master's degree in Equality and diversity at the Norwegian University of Science and Technology.

Amini is a member of the Norwegian PEN Board of Directors.

== Activism ==
Amini founded the 'Stop Stoning Forever Campaign' in October 2006. She worked together with a well known feminist from Iran and two writers from outside the country who could publish without censorship. She is fighting gender-based injustices in Iran's judicial system and is advocating for an end to stoning as a form of execution.

She started her activism when she met a 16-year-old girl named Atefeh Sahaaleh who had endured a lifetime of sexual abuse. As a result of that abuse, she was eventually sentenced for to death by stoning for crimes against chastity. Amini felt compelled to write about and investigate the practice of stoning. During her investigations she found out that despite Iran's commitment to the international community to abolish the practice stoning was still going on in secret. In 2002, Iran's chief justice declared a moratorium on stoning. Amini tried to publish her story but was soon after fired from her newspaper. The editor-in-chief of her newspaper said that it was impossible for them to publish the story as she was fighting Sharia law and the Iranian judicial system. She sent the story to another newspaper but they declined. After a long search, a women's publication agreed to publish an edited version.

Soon after the publishing of the story of Atefeh Amini heard of another similar story concerning the fate of Leyla, a nineteen-year-old with the mental age of an eight-year-old who was supposed to be hanged for chastity. Amini found out that the girl was still alive in a prison in Arak and decided to help her. The girl had first been put out for prostitution by her own mother at the age between five and eight. From then onward her mother prostituted her and lived from the money. Leyla gave birth to her first child at age nine and received a 100 lashes sentence for chastity for the first time. She was sentenced to death for incest among other things as her brothers had been among the townsmen who had raped her. Amini visited the judge who had sentenced Leyla and he said that the law is the law and that he was just applying it. He further stated, under Amini's account, that if the society was an apple Leyla was a worm. Amini wrote a story about Leyla in the magazine Zanan. The story echoed internationally. Even the Norwegian prime minister Kjell Magne Bondevik wrote a letter to Iranian president Khatami. Eventually, Leyla had a second trial. With the help of a friend of Shadi Sadr, her human rights attorney, Amini was able to have Leyla removed from prison and put in a social organization that provided her with private lessons and helped her to learn to read and to write. In 2007 Amini was arrested and imprisoned.

After this experience, Amini founded the 'Stop Stoning Forever Campaign'. She fights to have to practice of stoning stopped, researches cases of women who have been sentenced to death by stoning, and shares their stories with the public. After the re-election of Mahmoud Ahmadinejad in 2009 the situation of human rights activists became dangerous in Iran. Amini's phone calls were wiretapped, and her e-mail messages were surveilled. Four months after the re-election Amini went to exile in Norway. In Norway, she continued to be a contributor to a newspaper. She was also a guest writer in Trondheim City of Refuge from 2010 to 2012.

== Family ==
At the newspaper Zan, Amini met Javad Montazeri, a photographer from the Mazandaran region like her. After eight months they decided to get married. After giving birth to her daughter Ava her husband encouraged her to continue to work. When she became pregnant for a second time, she tried to take medicine that would induce a miscarriage, which would make it possible to go to an emergency room in a hospital and have the fetus removed. This was necessary because abortion is illegal in Iran. However, the medicine didn't work and Amini thought that she had damaged the fetus irreparably. So she proceeded to have an illegal abortion with complications but was able to return to work afterwards.

== Awards ==
- Hellman/ Hammett Award by Human Rights Watch in 2009
- Best Iranian poet by UNESCO's office in Tehran in 2005
- Oxfam Novib/ PEN award
- Ord i Grenseland Award in 2014

== Writings ==
- "Hey, ... You Who Have Gone "
- "Kom ikke til mine drømmer med gevær" ("Do not come into my dream with a gun")
- "Jeg savner å savne deg" ("I miss missing you")
- "Election Fallout- (Participated writer), Directed by Marcus Michaelsen"
