= Ross Benjamin =

American translator

Ross Benjamin is an American translator of German literature and a 2015 Guggenheim Fellow. His most recent translation is The Diaries of Franz Kafka.

He has won the Helen and Kurt Wolff Translator's Prize for his translation of Michael Maar's Speak, Nabokov. He also received a commendation from the judges of the Schlegel-Tieck Prize for his translation of Thomas Pletzinger's Funeral for a Dog. He is a graduate of Vassar College and a former Fulbright scholar.

His translation of Daniel Kehlmann's novel Tyll (2017) was shortlisted for the 2020 International Booker Prize.

Benjamin has written for the Times Literary Supplement, The Nation, etc. He lives in Nyack, New York.

The Times of London referred to Benjamin as a "comic virtuoso" for his work on Tyll by Daniel Kehlmann.

He is the son of attorney Jeff Benjamin and LCSW Betsy Benjamin.

== Translations ==
- Speak, Nabokov by Michael Maar
- Funeral for a Dog by Thomas Pletzinger
- Hyperion by Friedrich Hölderlin
- Close to Jedenew by Kevin Vennemann
- Job: The Story of a Simple Man by Joseph Roth
- The Frequencies by Clemens J. Setz (National Endowment for the Arts Literature Fellowship)
- And Then Life Happens: A Memoir by Auma Obama
- The Cusanus Game by Wolfgang Jeschke
- The Lone Assassin by Helmut Ortner
- When I Fell from the Sky by Juliane Koepcke
- War Games: A History of War on Paper by Philipp von Hilgers
- We Are All Stardust by Stefan Klein
- Indigo by Clemens J. Setz
- You Should Have Left by Daniel Kehlmann
- Tyll by Daniel Kehlmann
- The Diaries of Franz Kafka
- The Director by Daniel Kehlmann
