= Kleist Prize =

German literary award

The Kleist Prize is an annual German literature prize. The prize was first awarded in 1912, on the occasion of the hundredth anniversary of the death of Heinrich von Kleist the year before. The Kleist Prize was the most important literary award of the Weimar Republic, but was discontinued in 1933.

In 1985 the prize was awarded for the first time in over fifty years. Between 1994 and 2000 it was awarded biennially. Since 2026, a monetary sum of €30,000 accompanies the award; previously the amount was €20,000.

== Winners ==
Listings of the Kleist Prize winners are maintained by the Kleist-Archiv Sembdner. and Kleist Gesellschaft

=== 1912–1932 ===
- 1912 Hermann Burte and Reinhard Sorge
- 1913 Hermann Essig and Oskar Loerke
- 1914 Fritz von Unruh and Hermann Essig
- 1915 Robert Michel and Arnold Zweig
- 1916 Agnes Miegel and Heinrich Lersch
- 1917 Walter Hasenclever
- 1918 Leonhard Frank and Paul Zech
- 1919 Anton Dietzenschmidt and Kurt Heynicke
- 1920 Hans Henny Jahnn
- 1921 Paul Gurk
- 1922 Bertolt Brecht
- 1923 Wilhelm Lehmann and Robert Musil
- 1924 Ernst Barlach
- 1925 Carl Zuckmayer
- 1926 Alexander Lernet-Holenia and Alfred Neumann (Rahel Sanzara did not accept her prize), Honorable Mention: Martin Kessel
- 1927 Gerhard Menzel and Hans Meisel
- 1928 Anna Seghers
- 1929 Alfred Brust and Eduard Reinacher
- 1930 Reinhard Goering
- 1931 Ödön von Horvath and Erik Reger
- 1932 Richard Billinger and Else Lasker-Schüler

=== 1933–1984 ===
Discontinued

=== 1985–present ===
- 1985 Alexander Kluge for Die Macht der Gefühle
- 1986 Diana Kempff for Der Wanderer
- 1987 Thomas Brasch for Robert, ich, Fastnacht und die anderen
- 1988 Ulrich Horstmann
- 1989 Ernst Augustin for Der amerikanische Traum
- 1990 Heiner Müller for Hamletmaschine
- 1991 Gaston Salvatore for Lektionen der Finsternis
- 1992 Monika Maron for Stille Zeile Sechs
- 1993 Ernst Jandl for life works
- 1994 Herta Müller for Herztier
- 1996 Hans Joachim Schädlich for Der Kuckuck und die Nachtigall
- 1998 Dirk von Petersdorff for Wie es weitergeht & Zeitlösung
- 2000 Barbara Honigmann for Alles, alles Liebe!
- 2001 Judith Hermann for Sommerhaus, später
- 2002 Martin Mosebach for Eine lange Nacht, Der Nebenfürst & Das Grab der Pulcinellen
- 2003 Albert Ostermaier for Vatersprache
- 2004 Emine Sevgi Özdamar for Seltsame Sterne starren zur Erde. Wedding – Pankow 1976/77
- 2005 Gert Jonke for Seltsame Sache & Die versunkene Kathedrale
- 2006 Daniel Kehlmann for Ich und Kaminski & Die Vermessung der Welt
- 2007 Wilhelm Genazino for Mittelmäßiges Heimweh
- 2008 Max Goldt for life works
- 2009 Arnold Stadler (destined by Péter Esterházy) for Einmal auf der Welt. Und dann so
- 2010 Ferdinand von Schirach for Verbrechen
- 2011 Sibylle Lewitscharoff for Blumenberg
- 2012 Navid Kermani for life works
- 2013 Katja Lange-Müller for life works
- 2014 Marcel Beyer for life works
- 2015 Monika Rinck
- 2016 Yoko Tawada
- 2017 Ralf Rothmann
- 2018 Christoph Ransmayr
- 2019 Ilma Rakusa
- 2020 Clemens J. Setz
- 2021 not awarded
- 2022 Esther Kinsky
- 2023 Thomas Kunst
- 2024 Sasha Marianna Salzmann
- 2025 Daniela Seel
- 2026 Thomas Melle

== See also ==
- German literature
- List of literary awards
- List of years in literature
- List of years in poetry
