= Petrinum =

Petrinum may refer to:

== Religion ==
- Munus petrinum, the concept of the Primacy of the Roman Pontiff in the Church of Christ

== History ==
- The ancient village Petrinum on the site of the contemporary town of Mondragone, Italy

== Educational institutions ==
- Bischöfliches Gymnasium Petrinum, a private school established in 1896 in Linz, Austria
- Gymnasium Petrinum Brilon, a state funded school established in 1655 in Brilon, Germany
- Gymnasium Petrinum Dorsten, a state-funded school established in 1642 in Dorsten, Germany
- Gymnasium Petrinum Recklinghausen, a state-funded school established in 1421 in Recklinghausen, Germany
