= You Should Have Left =

2020 horror film by David Koepp

- Official release poster
- Directed by: David Koepp
- Screenplay by: David Koepp
- Based on: You Should Have Left by Daniel Kehlmann
- Produced by: Jason Blum; Dean O’Toole; Kevin Bacon
- Starring: Kevin Bacon; Amanda Seyfried; Avery Essex
- Cinematography: Angus Hudson
- Edited by: Derek Ambrosi
- Music by: Geoff Zanelli
- Production company: Blumhouse Productions
- Distributed by: Universal Pictures (Note: Had a limited release in theaters, but was primarily released on home video)
- Release date: June 18, 2020 (United States)
- Running time: 93 minutes
- Country: United States
- Language: English
- Budget: $4 million

You Should Have Left is a 2020 American psychological horror film written and directed by David Koepp, based on the 2017 book by Daniel Kehlmann. It stars Kevin Bacon and Amanda Seyfried. Jason Blum served as a producer through his Blumhouse Productions banner.

Originally intended to be theatrically released, the film was released digitally via Premium VOD on June 18, 2020, by Universal Pictures. It received mixed reviews from critics.

== Plot ==
Theodore Conroy is a retired banker married to Susanna, a young actress, and they have a daughter named Ella. The family books a vacation in Wales, but there is something strange about the house—time passes unusually fast, and everybody experiences nightmares while staying there. The couple also discovers that neither one of them made the booking, each thinking the other did it.

One night, Ella sees the shadow of a man on the wall. The next morning, she asks Susanna why people dislike Theo. Susanna reluctantly explains that Theo's first wife drowned in the bathtub, and people suspected that he killed her, though he was acquitted at trial. While in town for supplies, the shopkeeper asks if Theo has met Stetler, who Theo presumes is the home owner. He mysteriously gives Theo a drafting triangle and tells him to measure the right angles, leaving Theo confused.

Theo has a dream that night and sees someone has written in his meditation journal: "You should leave. Go now." The following morning, Theo discovers Susanna has been hiding a secret phone from him. He confronts her, and she admits having an affair with an actor. Theo asks her to leave for the night, and she goes into town to stay at an inn.

He returns to his journal to see that someone has now written "You should have left. Now it's too late." Upon discovering an anomaly in the angle between the wall and floor, Theo and Ella measure the kitchen and find that it is larger inside than outside. They get separated, and they experience separate visions in the dream world. Once reunited, Theo calls Susanna, wanting her to come back and take him and Ella away from the house, but her phone is turned off. He then calls the shopkeeper, inquiring whether he knows of any cab services in the area. The shopkeeper replies that there are none and speaks of the house cryptically, saying that the Devil collects souls from there.

Desperate to escape the house, Theo and Ella decide to go to town on foot, but see a shadowy figure observing them from inside as they walk away from it. After some time, they find they have circled back to the house. Seeing no other option, they stay there for the night, but Theo enters the dream world again and sees his and Susanna's past selves as they first arrived at the house. He then meets Stetler. Theo asks Stetler to let Ella go, and Stetler says Theo is the one who is keeping her here.

The next day, Susanna returns to the house. Theo finally confesses to the true circumstances surrounding the death of his first wife: he did not directly kill her, but did not help when she was drowning; he simply watched her die because he had been miserable with her for so long. He accepts that he belongs in the house, and lets Ella go with Susanna. Theo's spirit is then seen trapped inside the house, revealing he had been the figure watching himself and Ella leave the night before, having tried to warn his past self by writing the messages in his journal. The shopkeeper's voice says that some people do not leave the house and that "the place finds them anyway."

== Cast ==
- Kevin Bacon as Theo Conroy/Stetler
- Amanda Seyfried as Susanna
- Avery Essex as Ella
- Colin Blumenau as Shopkeeper
- Lowri Ann Richards as Welsh Woman

== Production ==
In March 2018, it was announced Kevin Bacon would star in the film, with David Koepp directing and writing, based on the novel of the same name by Daniel Kehlmann; Koepp and Bacon had previously collaborated on the 1999 film Stir of Echoes. Jason Blum served as a producer under his Blumhouse Productions banner. In June 2018, Amanda Seyfried joined the cast of the film.

Filming took place at various locations in Wales, including at the Life House in Llanbister, Radnorshire. Shooting also took place in Cresskill and Jersey City, New Jersey.

== Music ==
The film's score was composed by Geoff Zanelli. Back Lot Music released the soundtrack on June 18, 2020, coinciding with the film's streaming release.

== Release ==
You Should Have Left was released digitally via PVOD on June 18, 2020, by Universal Pictures. Universal decided to forego the film's originally scheduled theatrical release in the United States and Canada due to movie theater closures since mid-March, because of COVID-19 pandemic restrictions.

== Reception ==
=== VOD sales ===
In its first weekend, the film was the second-most rented on FandangoNow and the iTunes Store. In its second weekend, it fell to number three and number six, respectively. In its third weekend the film placed sixth on FandangoNow, but ranked second on Spectrum's weekly chart, then the following weekend placed fifth on both services. Over the weekend of July 31, Universal lowered the price of the film from $19.99 to $5.99, and You Should Have Left finished second on FandangoNow and fifth at Apple TV.

=== Critical response ===
On Rotten Tomatoes, the film holds an approval rating of 41% based on 110 reviews, with an average rating of 4.9/10. The site's critics consensus reads, "You Should Have Left hints at a genuinely creepy experience, but never quite manages to distill its intriguing ingredients into a consistently satisfying whole." At Metacritic, the film has a weighted average score of 46 out of 100, based on 27 critics, indicating "mixed or average reviews".

Kate Erbland of IndieWire gave the film a "B−" and said, "when You Should Have Left is at its best, it's unconcerned with mapping out such easy clarifications and leans into the raw madness of corrosive guilt and a house made to punish people who dare come inside its walls." Critic Terry Mesnard wrote that the larger-than-it-seems house in the film felt "ripped" from the 2000 novel House of Leaves by Mark Z. Danielewski.
