= Wissenswertes über Erlangen =

Single by Foyer des Arts

from the album Von Bullerbü nach Babylon
- Released: 1982
- Genre: Neue Deutsche Welle
- Length: 4:43
- Label: Warner Music Group
- Songwriters: Max Goldt, Gerd Pasemann

"Wissenswertes über Erlangen" is a 1982 song by the Berlin-based band Foyer des Arts, considered being part of the Neue Deutsche Welle. The music was written by Max Goldt and Gerd Pasemann, the lyrics by Max Goldt. The song caricatures a sightseeing tour around a rather normal city.

== Background ==
Max Goldt, having worked previously as tour guide for sightseeing tours in West Berlin, reflects on his thereby gathered experiences . The song appeared on the album Von Bullerbü nach Babylon and was also released as a single.

== Music ==
The instrumentation depends on simple musical aspects. There is a simple drum backbeat, the bassline, and a string instrument riff as well as a trumpet fanfare. The song is in 4/4 time and characterized by the constant change between B minor and A major chords. Ironically, the song starts with seagulls screeching and a fog horn, which is an inappropriate introduction considering Erlangen's inland location.

== Content ==
The song is spoken rhythmically, from the perspective of a tour guide, showing German-speaking tourists around Erlangen, but from an outside perspective, without any useful information about what makes the city unique. ("Here on the left is the church / It was built in the past [...] / Now we're approaching the marketplace / in the local dialect they call it "das Stadtzentrum (city center)") And trite, unoriginal statements such as ("This place is unknown for miles around." or "Here are the past and present joined."). In the refrain, Max Goldt imitates a feminine tourist group, singing "That is a nice young man / He knows everything about this! / There are so many useful facts about Erlangen!"; the first syllable of the word "Erlangen" is stretched out.

The lyrics portray a philistine chat between the tourists and the tour guide about German places, regions, and tours, with Goldt playing every role himself. First the city-dwellers reply with praise, ("I love the Erlangers' humor, [...] and Erlanger is so hospitable."), then the tone shifts gradually rougher, with the tour group outraged at long-haired, the Jeans-wearing tour guide, and the cigarette butts littering on the street. The result of the discussion is the tourists boasting about their respective hometowns, ("Well Martha, In Bielefeld, everything oh so clean." -"I'm from Wolfsburg, there everything is oh so beautiful.")

== Reception ==
The song reached #36 on the German Single Charts, making Wissenswertes über Erlangen the most commercially successful song the band has ever made. Foyer des Arts performed the song, among others, in music shops and on the ZDF Hit Parade. In 2001 Bürger Lars Dietrich published a cover version.
