= The Director (Kehlmann novel) =

2023 novel by Daniel Kehlmann

- German cover
- Author: Daniel Kehlmann
- Original title: Lichtspiel
- Translator: Ross Benjamin
- Language: German
- Publisher: Rowohlt Verlag, riverrun
- Publication date: 2023
- English publication date: 2025

The Director (German: Lichtspiel, lit. 'Play of light' (Note: Lichtspiel is an old-fashioned term in German meaning "cinema".)) is a 2023 novel by German-Austrian author Daniel Kehlmann. The novel is a fictionalization of the life of the 20th-century German director G. W. Pabst. The novel was met with positive reception, both in Germany and internationally; it made several best-of lists in 2025, and in 2026 it was shortlisted for the 2026 International Booker Prize.

== Plot ==
The novel is divided into three parts. The first part, Outside, is set in the 1920s and 1930s, and chronicles Pabst's career in the Weimar Republic and his filming of A Modern Hero in America, which turns out to be a flop. The second part, Inside, focuses on Pabst's career in Nazi-era Germany and his filming of the lost film Der Fall Molander. The third part, After, focuses on Pabst's life after the war.

== Reception ==
Adam Soboczynski of Die Zeit called The Director a "great work about moral failure"; Gerrit Bartels of Der Tagesspiegel called the novel a ""marvel". Carsten Otte of Die Tageszeitung gave a mixed review, praising individual scenes of the book, but criticizing the characters for their lack of psychological depth and the prose; he concluded that "successful individual scenes do not make for a convincing novel".

The Director received starred reviews from Kirkus Reviews and Publishers Weekly. Nina Allan, writing for The Guardian, called The Director "Kehlmann's best work yet"; J. Hoberman in his review for the New York Times wrote that The Director was "a marvelous performance" and praised Benjamin's translation.

The Director was released in English and French in 2025; it was named in several best-of lists of that year - New York Times named it among the ten best books of 2025, the BBC named it among the 25 best books of that year, The Guardian named it as among the best translated fiction released that year and Le Monde as one of the best novels of 2025. In 2026, it was shortlisted for the International Booker Prize.
