= Measuring the World (film) =

- Theatrical release poster
- Directed by: Detlev Buck
- Written by: Detlev Buck; Daniel Nocke; Daniel Kehlmann
- Based on: Measuring the World by Daniel Kehlmann
- Produced by: Detlev Buck; Claus Boje
- Starring: Florian David Fitz; Albrecht Schuch
- Cinematography: Sławomir Idziak
- Edited by: Dirk Grau
- Music by: Enis Rotthoff
- Production companies: Boje Buck Filmproduktion; Lotus-Film
- Distributed by: Warner Bros. Pictures
- Release date: 25 October 2012
- Running time: 119 minutes
- Countries: Germany; Austria
- Language: German
- Box office: $7,930,771

Measuring the World (German: Die Vermessung der Welt) is a 2012 German-Austrian 3D film directed by Detlev Buck, based on the eponymous novel by Daniel Kehlmann.

== Plot ==
The movie, based on the partly authentic, partly fictional book, tells the life story of mathematician Carl Friedrich Gauß and the biologist Alexander von Humboldt. While Humboldt travels the world to research flora and fauna, Gauß focuses on advancing in the field of mathematics.

== Cast ==
- Florian David Fitz as Carl Friedrich Gauß
- Albrecht Schuch as Alexander von Humboldt
- Jérémy Kapone as Aimé Bonpland
- Vicky Krieps as Johanna Gauß
- Katharina Thalbach as Dorothea Gauß (mother)
- Guntbert Warns as Gerhard Dietrich Gauß (father)
- David Kross as Eugen Gauß (son)
- Sunnyi Melles as Marie Elizabeth von Humboldt (mother)
- Karl Markovics as Lehrer Büttner
