= Paul Zech =

German expressionist writer and poet

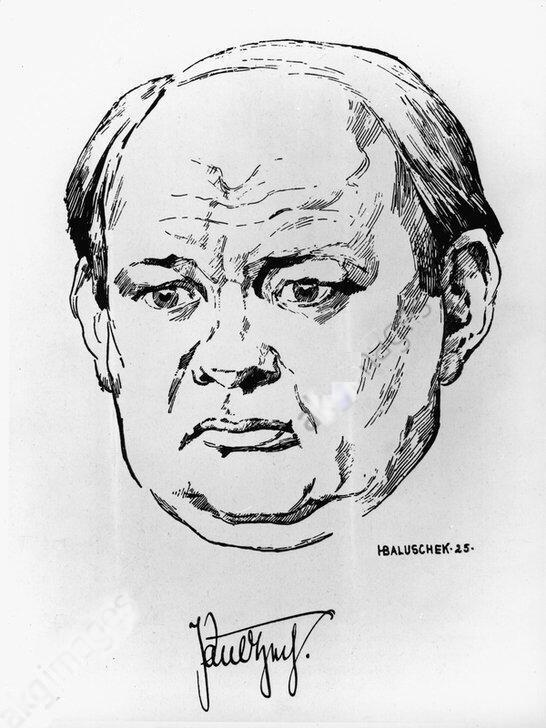
- Illustration of Paul Zech by Hans Baluschek
- Born: February 19, 1881; Briesen, West Prussia
- Died: September 7, 1946 (aged 65); Buenos Aires, Argentina
- Occupations: Poet, novelist, dramatist, translator, journalist
- Writing career
- Notable awards: Kleist Prize
- Movement: Expressionism

Paul Zech (19 February 1881 – 7 September 1946) was a German expressionist writer and poet.

== Biography ==
Paul Zech came from the large family of a craftsman as the eldest of six surviving children. At the age of 5, he was entrusted to his maternal grandparents. He attended school until the age of 14 and then began an apprenticeship in baking which was unsuccessful. He then left for Belgium to work in the coal mines of the Charleroi basin, in 1898. Back in Germany he married Helene Siemon, a shoemaker's daughter in July 1904, whom he had a child with.

Zech began writing his first poems in 1901. His poems were published in local or regional magazines. In 1907, he took part in the annual Cologne poetry competition and received “honorable mention”. From 1910 he lived in Berlin and turned to poetry. He published in Herwarth Walden's expressionist journal Der Sturm and founded his own publication Das neue Pathos. His poems earned him the Kleist Prize in 1918. While keeping a classic form, his poems reveal a tendency towards expressionism through the themes of the city, mines, oppression, and alienation.

At the start of the First World War, in 1914 Zech wrote patriotic poems but by 1915, his enthusiasm for the war gave way to skepticism. He participated in the battles on the Western Front, notably at the Battle of Verdun and the Battle of the Somme. In the summer of 1916 he was seriously injured when he was buried in a trench. He was decorated with the Iron Cross. In 1917, he was assigned to the rear of the front. He then wrote propaganda texts for the army. Under the pseudonym Michel Michael, he published pacifist poems in 1919.

The years immediately after the war were the high point of the literary career. In 1918 he was again awarded the Kleist Prize for his poetry. His financial wealth allowed him to acquire a small house near Lake Bestensee to the southeast of Berlin. Severe mental problems forced him to spend several months in a psychiatric hospital. He subsequently led a double life. He had a relationship with singer Hilde Herb, which led to financial setbacks.

Despite his many difficulties, he was extremely creative in the post-war years. In 1921, he published anonymously erotic poems (Allegro de Plaisir), including sonnets inspired by his relationship with the young Hilde Herb. He also wrote autobiographical stories such as The Mad Heart (1925), The Journey of Pain (1925). He also wrote essays and literary dramas. He adapted Le Bateau ivre by Arthur Rimbaud for the theater in 1926.

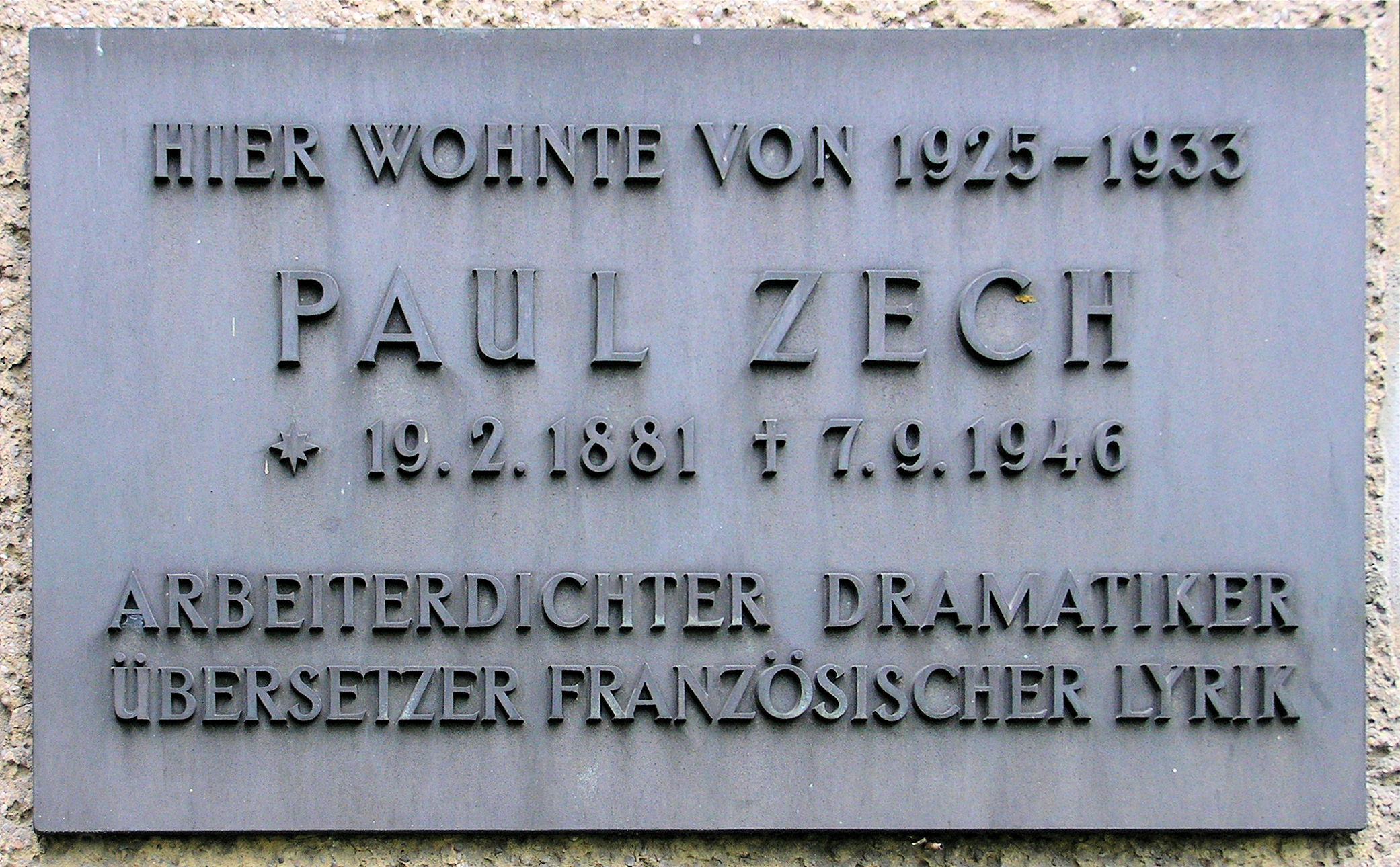
Memorial plaque

At first in August 1933, suspected of embezzlement and theft, he left Berlin for Vienna and Trieste and embarked there for Montevideo, Buenos Aires. As a supporter of the SPD and prominent left-wing intellectual, Zech did not return to Nazi Germany. He became popular with the German anti-Nazi community in Argentina. At the end of the Second World War, he decided to return to Germany but was not able to do so because of his financial difficulties. He died in Buenos Aires after suffering an illness in September 1946.

His urn was moved to the Städtischer Friedhof III cemetery in Berlin-Friedenau in 1971. The grave is one of the honorary graves of the state of Berlin.

== Works ==
=== Original works ===
Die Liste allein der Buchpublikationen Zechs umfasst viele Dutzend Titel.

- Das schwarze Revier. Gedichte. A. R. Meyer, Berlin 1912.
- Das törichte Herz, Berlin: J. H. W. Dietz Nachf., 1925, DNB-IDN: 578466139
- Der feurige Busch : Neue Gedichte (1912–1917), München: Musarion-Verlag, 1919, DNB-IDN: 578466058
- Nachmittagstraum eine Fauns / Stéphane Mallarmé L' Aprés-midi d'un faune. Deutsche Nachdichtung von Paul Zech, Berlin, 1922, DNB-IDN: 577271687

=== Posthumous publications ===
- Ausgewählte Werke Hrsg. […] von Bert Kasties. 5 Bände, Aachen: Shaker, 1998–1999. Band I enthält (S. 8–42) eine vorzügliche biografische Einführung, die allerdings durch die jüngsten Forschungen Alfred Hübners schon wieder korrekturbedürftig ist.
- Die lasterhaften Balladen und Lieder des François Villon. Nachdichtung von Paul Zech. Mit einer Biographie über Villon. München, dtv, 1962 u.ö., ISBN 3-423-00043-0 (Es handelt sich um eine stark überarbeitete Neuausgabe von Die Balladen und lasterhaften Lieder des Herrn François Villon in deutscher Nachdichtung von Paul Zech, Weimar 1931)
- Vom schwarzen Revier zur Neuen Welt – Gesammelte Gedichte. 1983, ISBN 3-446-13576-6.
- Deutschland, dein Tänzer ist der Tod. Ein Tatsachen-Roman. Greifenverlag, Rudolstadt, 1981; wieder Fischer, Frankfurt 1984, ISBN 3-596-25189-3 (Reihe: Verboten und verbrannt)
- Michael M. irrt durch Buenos Aires. Greifen, Rudolstadt 1985.
- Von der Maas bis an die Marne. Ein Kriegstagebuch. Greifen, Rudolstadt 1986.
- Der schwarze Baal. Novellen. Hrsg. und mit einem Nachwort von M. Martínez. Göttingen 1989, ISBN 3-89244-007-7.
- Paul Zech Lesebuch. (= Nylands Kleine Westfälische Bibliothek. 12). Zusammengestellt und mit einem Nachwort versehen von Wolfgang Delseit. Köln 2005, ISBN 3-936235-13-9 Online-Ausgabe des Lesebuchs
- Wuppertal. Bergische Dichtungen/Begegnungen mit Else Lasker-Schüler. Hrsg. und mit einem Nachwort von Christoph Haacker. Arco, Wuppertal 2013, ISBN 978-3-938375-28-0.
- Was wird hinter dem Dunkel sein? Die schönsten Gedichte von Paul Zech. Herausgegeben von Oliver Fehn. Pandämonium, Söhrewald 2017, ISBN 978-3-944893-15-0.
- Trunkenes Schiff. Szenische Ballade um Arthur Rimbaud. Berlin 2022, ISBN 978-3-945980-67-5. PDF
