= Agnes Hürland-Büning =

German politician (1926–2009)

Member of the Bundestag
- In office 13 December 1972 – 20 December 1990

Agnes Hürland-Büning (born Agnes Oleynik: 17 May 1926 – 9 March 2009) was a German politician with strong local roots. She was a member of the Bundestag (Germany's "national parliament") for nearly twenty years between 1972 and 1991. She chaired the local Recklinghausen CDU party between 1977 and 1983, and served between 1979 and 1983 as deputy party chair for the CDU regional party executive in Westfalen-Lippe. Between 1987 and 1991 she was a parliamentary secretary of state in the West German Defence Ministry.

It later emerged that she had become entangled, as an industry lobbyist, in the CDU donations scandal. The prosecutors' office in Düsseldorf launched an investigation against her in respect of allegations involving serious fraud, false statements and tax evasion, but by 2007 she was seriously ill and the case was suspended. It was dropped in 2008 on account of Hürland-Büning's "permanent incapacity to deal with matters" ("wegen dauernder Verhandlungsunfähigkeit der Angeklagten").

== Biography ==
=== Early years ===
Agnes Oleynik was born into a Roman Catholic family in Holsterhausen, a small town on the western fringes of Dorsten (into which it was formally subsumed in 1943), a mid-sized mining and industrial town north of Essen, a short distance to the east of the Dutch frontier and Nijmegen. She was enrolled at the local Catholic school in 1932. War broke out when she was 13 and troops were stationed at the school: teaching immediately became more "irregular" ("... sehr unregelmäßig"), especially after the children were sent to take part in combined classes at one of the two nearby protestant schools. She completed her schooling young, with others in her cohort, in the spring of 1940, and was conscripted into the Labour Service ("Reichsarbeitsdienst"). She was later sent to work in a munitions factory. After war ended, in May 1945, she worked as a volunteer nurse before moving on to complete an apprenticeship as a carer at the "Westfalia Welfare College" ("Westfälische Wohlfahrtsschule") in Münster.

Sources are for the most part silent about her marriage, but by 1960, when she returned to the labour market, it was as Agnes Hürland, the mother of four or five children. She was employed, till 1968, as a secretary / senior support worker ("Chefassistentin") with an industrial business. She worked for two years for the national labour agency. After that there were two years as a rehabilitation counsellor. There are also references to her having worked as an insurance and real-estate broker ("Immobilienmaklerin") during the 1960s and / or early 1970s. By 1969 her marriage had ended in divorce: there is a mention of her husband having been affected by alcoholism.

=== Politics ===
After a brief flirtation with the centre-left Social Democratic Party (SPD) – "because I confused 'social' with 'social democratic'" (Note: "weil ich sozial und sozialdemokratisch verwechselte") – Agnes Hürland-Büning joined the centre-right CDU in 1964. She served as a local councillor in Dorsten between 1969 and 1975, taking a particular interest in social policy. Her career as a national politician started only when she was. Her inclusion on the CDU candidate list for North Rhine-Westphalia resulted, according to one unsympathetic source, from the party's introduction of gender quotas. As a result, she found herself elected to the Bundestag in 1972. Nationally the election result was a close one, and many commentators were surprised when, following coalition negotiations, the SPD's Willy Brandt returned to power as Chancellor, while the CDU remained in opposition. Hürland-Büning became a member of the Bundestag Committee for Labour and Social Affairs, in which she took a particular interest in to the needs of the disabled.

Helmut Kohl took over as CDU party leader in 1973. Apart from her committee work she maintained a low profile in the Bundestag. Kohl nevertheless valued her as a loyal party stalwart and when, in 1982, power finally passed to the CDU, Chancellor Kohl appointed her as "party business leader" (" Fraktions-Geschäftsführerin") in the chamber. She became known for her humanity, warmth, and willingness to reach out and make informal alliances with members of rival parties. Even so, evidence of her political impact was limited. Described by colleagues and observers – sometimes admiringly and sometimes disparagingly – as "the mother of the CDU/CSU party Bundestag group", one underwhelmed commentator suggested that she was at her happiest when organising the annual early summer asparagus lunch for the CDU Bundestag faction. Yet even if some commentators thought her something of a political lightweight, the parliamentary group's leader at the time, Alfred Dregger, made it known that behind the scenes he greatly valued her qualities, especially her "reliability and her political antennae" ("Ihre Zuverlässigkeit und ihr Fingerspitzengefühl").

Directly after the 1987 election Chancellor Kohl made Hürland-Büning his secretary of state for defence. She had no great specialist knowledge of defence matters, but many felt that her human qualities more than compensated for a lack of technical expertise. Her grandmotherly manner, on display when she visited young recruits and junior officers, provided a reassuring picture. Indeed, her appointment found support not just within the governing coalition parties but also from the SPD which was the principal opposition party. She was the first woman to hold the post. She paid particular attention to the welfare of the junior ranks. One development that she oversaw was a pilot project for the recruitment of female soldiers (on a volunteer basis). She continued to enjoy a close political relationship with Helmut Kohl. She believed in him. In a prescient remark during a visit to the Knesset in Jerusalem she noted that if anyone could achieve German reunification, it was Helmut Kohl. Commentators also note that her position within the Ministry of Defence meant that military contracts worth million of marks crossed Agnes Hürland-Büning's desk.

1990 was the year of German reunification, and the first general election of the newly unified country took place on 2 December 1990. By now approximately six months short of her sixty-fifth birthday, Hürland-Büning did not stand for re-election. She accordingly retired from the Bundestag early in 1991, ahead of the new parliamentary session. She retired with her reputation in robust good order, awarded (among other honours) the Order of Merit ("Große Bundesverdienstkreuz der Bundesrepublik") and the Order of Olga. In June 1992 she was elected to chair a newly reconvened independent military Staff Appraisal Commission ("Personalgutachterausschuss"), which this time comprised fifteen independent members and was mandated by the West German Defence Ministry to determine which soldiers from the old East German National People's Army (" Nationale Volksarmee" / NVA) could be taken into the army of the newly reunified Germany ("Bundeswehr").

=== Investigations ===
In May 1999 Agnes Hürland-Büning accepted appointment to the so-called Weizsäcker Commission, set up under the leadership of former president Richard von Weizsäcker by the Schröder government to identify Germany's security risks and interests, and to provide recommendations acceptable to the main parties on how the German army should be configured in order to best fulfill its role in the context of a comprehensive security and defence policy. However, the name of Agnes Hürland-Büning hit the headlines towards the end of that year in connection with the emerging CDU donations scandal: more details of her alleged involvement in those events, most of which dated back to 1992, appeared in Der Spiegel in January 2000. Hürland-Büning resigned her membership of the Weizsäcker Commission on 20 January 2000, a few days after the Spiegel piece appeared. Her involvement in transferring members of the old East German People's Army to the Bundeswehr was also abruptly terminated when she was dismissed by means of a telephone call from Defences Minister Scharping.

According to the report of a parliamentary committee of enquiry, after retiring from her position with the Ministry of Defence, Agnes Hürland-Büning concluded several high-value "dubious consultancy agreements". Just two of the agreements, those with Thyssen AG and Elf Aquitaine, yielded fees amounting to eight and a half or nine and a half million Marks. (Sources differ.) What she had to do for all this money never became entirely clear. According to one report, she told the enquiry committee that she was to her influence with the regional government of Saxony-Anhalt to ensure the blocking of a pipeline construction project linking the port of Wilhelmshaven with the oil refinery at Leuna: it was suggested that the pipeline, if built, would have reduced the attractiveness of the Leuna oil refinery which was being acquired by Elf Aquitaine in a murky deal allegedly involving Helmut Kohl. However, investigators felt that this may have amounted, at best, to an incomplete explanation, especially given that eight years later the pipeline construction in question had never taken place, apparently for unrelated reasons. Investigators appear never fully to have plumbed the suspected depths of the so-called Leuna affair, which sources imply may have been focused not so much on the personal enrichment of top politicians as on the garnering of funds to cover the political expenses incurred by the CDU. Investigators felt that the massive fees received by Hürland-Büning were completely disproportionate to anything that she might have done to earn them. There was also widespread speculation that even if she had received the fees stated, it had never been intended that she should be the ultimate recipient. The suspicion persisted that she had passed on the funds in the wider context of the Leuna affair and of the associated CDU donations scandal. One member of the parliamentary committee was Friedhelm Julius Beucher of the SPD. He described Hürland-Büning as a "living money-laundering system for the [Christian Democratic] Union (CDU). I think the lady's involvement was as the suitcase carrier" (eine "lebende Geldwaschanlage der Union. Ich glaube, die Dame war als Kofferträgerin aktiv."). In the words of one commentator, the suspected contents of the suitcase were "black money for Kohl's black coffers" ("schwarzes Geld für Kohls schwarze Kassen"). Nevertheless, it was clear from much of the media comment that many suspected that Hürland-Büning had also enriched herself along the way. It was reported that shortly after the conclusion of her consultancy agreement, her younger son Norbert had opened a real estate business on the edge of town, and that she had invested capital in the business, although the allegations implied by the much of press reporting remained resolutely imprecise.

As it became known that the prosecutors' office in Düsseldorf had launched a criminal investigation against her concerning various matters such as allegations of a bogus consultancy contract with a former subsidiary of the Thyssen Group, she became the target of an intensifying feeding frenzy by the popular press, identified in headlines variously as "Germany's greediest politician" and "Frau Raffzahn" (an untranslatable dialect insult). Investigations by the prosecutors' office were followed by the issuance of charges in December 2003. Meanwhile, further financial woes surfaced closer to home when the Dorsten local council, noting that the tax office had determined that Hürland-Büning's activities as a consultant had amounted to operating a business, and not merely involved her supporting herself as a self-employed worker such as a country doctor or tax advisor working from home. Once her consultancy activities had been defined as a business it became liable for substantial arrears of unpaid business tax to the municipality.

=== Final years ===
During her final years, with the threat of legal sanctions hanging over her, and a new generation of leaders controlling the CDU, there are indications that Hürland-Büning felt abandoned by those who had previously been friends. Her former mentor Helmut Kohl increasingly withdrew from public life after the CDU donations scandal became public, especially following the tragic death of his first wife in 2001. Within the little town of Dorsten there emerges a sense, from some sources, that family members and remaining friends felt that the work she had been able to do for individual citizens with problems, for Dorsten businesses, and for the town more generally, were all too quickly forgotten. Meanwhile, at her criminal trial matters took a new twist in September 2004 when her defence lawyer submitted a doctor's certificate attesting that the 78 year old defendant's deteriorating health meant that she was no longer sufficiently fit to enable a fair trial take place. Although it would take more than three more years for the court to reach a final decision in respect of the medical evidence, it was becoming increasingly likely that Agnes Hürland-Büning would go to the grave unconvicted but without her name ever being cleared. That was indeed the position on 9 March 2009 when she died following a major operation. Only her family and a small number of close friends were present at her burial. Her parliamentary colleagues were represented by a wreath that arrived from the Bundestag. Since then she has been commemorated each year by a further wreath, sent on All Saints' Day, and decorated with the black/red/gold sash of the CDU/CSU, on behalf of her Bundestag former party colleagues and their successors in Berlin.

=== Posthumous insolvency proceedings ===
In 2011 insolvency proceedings were launched against the estate of Agnes Hürland-Büning in respect of around €200,000 in unpaid business taxes payable to the municipality of Dorsten at the time of her death. By 2011 the debt had been reduced to around €170,000 by means of monthly payments of €1,000. The city maintained its claim for the balance through the bankruptcy. The business tax claim by the municipality had already been the subject of major disagreements within the council as far back as 2002. At that point CDU councillors, with their controlling majority, had agreed to a compromise deal with their high-profile debtor, freezing the debt and hoping, by means of the agreement, at least to secure monthly repayments of €1,000. SPD and Green Party councillors had opposed the settlement while the FDP councillors had abstained in the vote.

The CDU share of the votes in the local council election slipped below 50% in 2009, although they remained the largest single party, with 22 of the 44 council seats. In 2012, during an interview concerning the state of municipal finances, a reporter asked the Dorsten town treasurer – another CDU councillor – about the prospects of recovering the unpaid business taxes of former CDU Bundestag member Agnes Hürland-Büning. The prospects remained unclear. The treasurer declined to speculate on how much money would become available at the conclusion of the insolvency proceedings.

== Autobahn Exit 37½ ==
Bundesautobahn 31 runs parallel with the Dutch frontier, linking Emden in the north with Bottrop to the south. The section passing to the west of Dorsten was completed and opened in 1989. Between Junctions 37 and 38 there is an unmarked junction, without signage and without a junction number. The unmarked junction was not included in the plans for the road, and only those with local knowledge are aware that it can be accessed by leaving or joining the Autobahn where maps and signs indicate a parking area ("Parkplatz Dorsten-Holsterhausen"). The limited access junction only permits traffic to join the Autobahn in a southerly direction, towards Bottrop (and, indirectly, Bonn) or to leave the Autobahn travelling north (from Bottrop and, indirectly, Bonn). Locally it is often identified as the "Hürland junction" ("Hürlandausfahrt") which is a reference to the persistent belief that the junction was added at the last minute, shortly before the new road section was opened, in order to facilitate the drive between Agnes Hürland-Büning's home, which was very near the junction, and her work at the Bundestag and the Defence Ministry (which till 1990 were located in Bonn). The rumour gained added traction after the name of the former secretary of state began to appear in press reports connecting her with the CDU donations scandal. Der Spiegel gave it national coverage in 2000 and repeated it in 2002.

In 2009 the pupils in class 9a at the Gymnasium St. Ursula (secondary school) undertook what turned out to be an award winning investigation into the origins of the "Hürlandausfahrt". Arnold Erwig, their politics teacher, admitted that at the outset he had always assumed the rumours were true. The children conducted interviews. It was a mark of the continuing controversy surrounding Agnes Hürland-Büning, nearly twenty years after her retirement, that many who might have been able to provide information refused to do so, while others only responded to the pupil's questions on condition that their contributions should be recorded without attribution. Only a few were prepared to have their voices recorded. Nevertheless, from those who did agree to answer questions there was confirmation that the hidden junction had "always been used" by Hürland-Büning when she used to drive home "with Mr. [Helmut] Kohl" (Note: "Die kam ja immer mit dem Herrn (Helmut) Kohl hier ‘runter gefahren. Das war ja für beide ...") However, research into the minutes of council meetings and other documents to which the city authorities provided access disclosed a more nuanced story than the one implied by the press rumours. The town council had indeed objected to the Autobahn plans which had specified a junction at the hamlet of Schembeck, to the north, and a junction at Dorsten-West, some distance to the south. The motorway plans had replaced a long-standing but never implemented project for a little ring-road round Dorsten which would also have enjoyed full access to and from Dorsten-Holsterhausen, and in that respect the Autobahn would provide inferior access to that envisaged for the never constructed ring road. The city father demanded an extra Autobahn junction, but without success. They then invoked their local representative in the Bundestag. Through her relationship with Chancellor Kohl, it turned out that Agnes Hürland-Büning did enjoy more influence with the transport planners than might have been expected. Even her lobbying powers were not sufficient to provide for a complete additional junction, but the unmarked junction, accessible through the parking area, represented a compromise for which the city council at the time was appreciative. Those with the necessary local knowledge were able to save themselves time by using the "secret" junction: at the time that did indeed includes Agnes Hürland-Büning herself.
