= Fame (novel) =

2009 novel by Daniel Kehlmann

- First edition cover
- Author: Daniel Kehlmann
- Original title: Ruhm
- Translator: Carol Brown Janeway
- Language: German
- Publisher: Rowohlt Verlag
- Publication date: 16 January 2009
- Publication place: Austria; Germany
- English publication date: 2010
- Pages: 208
- ISBN: 3-498-03543-6

Fame (German: Ruhm) is a 2009 novel by the Austrian-German writer Daniel Kehlmann. The narrative consists of nine loosely connected stories about technology, celebrity, identity, alienation and the Internet. The book has the subtitle "A novel in nine episodes" ("Ein Roman in neun Geschichten"). A movie has been created about it called Glory: A Tale of Mistaken Identities (2012).

== Reception ==
Gregory Leon Miller of the San Francisco Chronicle called the book "a darkly comic masterpiece, a rare and thrilling example of a philosophical novel as pleasurable as it is thought-provoking." Miller wrote that "Kehlmann insightfully explores fame's spell", and "The novel's more somber existential propositions are leavened by Kehlmann's penchant for offhand absurdity. ... Other books have gained more attention this season. None are more deserving." Edmund Gordon of The Observer wrote that "if there is a criticism to be made of Fame, it is that the impression it gives – of this wildly successful young author shaking his head at the Kafkaesque lifestyle his reputation has foisted upon him – can seem rather irritating". Gordon also argued that the book is not a novel but a short story collection, and assumed it was marketed as a novel only because "short story collections do not sell". Gordon wrote: "This mild deception doesn't affect the simple elegance of Kehlmann's writing or the brilliance of his wit. But his willingness to package his work in a way that makes it more marketable (and a writer with so many sales behind him must have had some say in the matter) suggests a level of collusion with that bitch villain of his new book."

The book was longlisted for the Independent Foreign Fiction Prize.

== See also ==
- 2009 in literature
- German literature
