= Else Gabriel =

German artist (born 1962)

- Born: 1962; Halberstadt, East Germany
- Known for: Performance art, Photography

Else Gabriel (b. 1962) is a German performance artist and educator.

== Biography ==
Else Gabriel was born in Halberstadt, East Germany in 1962. She studied at the Dresden Academy of Fine Arts. Else was a key artist in the alternative arts scene that formed by late 1980s. Along with Micha Brendel, Rainer Gorb, and Via Lewandowsky. She was a member of Autoperforatsionsartisten (Auto perforation artists). The Autoperforatsionsartisten, an East German performance art group, combined fluxus and neodada with body art and installations in a multimedia spectacle. In addition to performance art, Else is known for her photographs, in which she combined personal text with images. Though this format did not appear to be logically tied, her intent behind this is to produce an associative, sensual frame of reference. In 1989, six weeks before the Fall of the Berlin Wall, Gabriel married West-Berlin writer Max Goldt in order to leave the GDR.

Since 1991, she has been a part of the group (e.) Twin Gabriel with her partner Ulf Wrede. Gabriel was included in the 1991 exhibition Berlin Divided: Sissel Tolas, Milovan Markovic, Else Gabriel, Rolf Julius at MoMA. In 2019 she was included in the exhibit The Medea Insurrection: Radical Women Artists Behind the Iron Curtain at Wende Museum in Culver City, California.

She has taught at the ArtCenter College of Design in Pasadena, California and lectured at the University of Hamburg, the University of Kassel, the University of Kiel and Saarland University. Since 2009 she has taught in Berlin at Kunsthochschule Berlin-Weißensee, in the Sculpture Department.
