= Von Bullerbü nach Babylon =

Studio album by Foyer des Arts
- Released: 1982
- Genre: Pop, new wave
- Label: WEA

Foyer des Arts chronology
Die seltsame Sekretärin (1981)	Von Bullerbü nach Babylon (1982)	Die Unfähigkeit zu Frühstücken (1986)

Von Bullerbü nach Babylon ("from Bullerbü to Babylon") is the second album of the German pop duo Foyer des Arts. The title is derived from Bullerbü, the German name for the village in The Six Bullerby Children).

Foyer des Arts was signed by WEA after their 1981 local hit "Eine Königin mit Rädern untendran" ("A Queen with Wheels Below"). The album spawned two more singles, "Wissenswertes über Erlangen" ("Things Worth Knowing about Erlangen") and "Trends / Hubschraubereinsatz". The former was Foyer des Arts' only hit, reaching number 36 in the Media Control Charts.

Long out of print, the album was re-edited and re-released on CD in 2003 with a slightly different track listing.

== Original edition ==
Side A:

1. "Wissenswertes über Erlangen" (4'42)
2. "Steps Into the Ministry" (3'35)
3. "Komm in den Garten" (4'52)
4. "Toulouse-Lautrec" (4'19)
5. "Wolfram Siebeck hat recht" (1'59)
6. "Little Girls" (3'10)

Side B:

1. "Eine Königin mit Rädern untendran" (3'50)
2. "Olympia" (4'35)
3. "Trends" (3'24)
4. "Familie und Beatmusic" (1'48)
5. "Schön bunt" (4'59)
6. "Hubschraubereinsatz" (1'59)

== CD edition ==
1. "Von Bullerbü nach Babylon" (2'03)
2. "Steps Into the Ministry" (3'35)
3. "Komm in den Garten" (4'52)
4. "Toulouse-Lautrec" (4'19)
5. "Einer vom Theater" / "Vom Kriege" (3'23)
6. "Eine Königin mit Rädern untendran" (5'30)
7. "Comment and Create" (2'47)
8. "Trends" (3'24)
9. "Wolfram Siebeck hat recht" (1'59)
10. "Olympia" (4'35)
11. "Hubschraubereinsatz" (1'59)
12. "Wissenswertes über Erlangen" (4'42)

The new edition omits "Little Girls", "Familie und Beatmusic" and "Schön bunt" in favor of "Von Bullerbü nach Babylon" (until then never issued), "Comment and Create" (B-side from the first edition of Eine Königin... 7") and "Einer von Theater" / "Von Kriege" (B-side from Wissenwertes... 7"). "Eine Königin" is an extended remix with a repetition of the middle section, and a slightly longer fade-out. The cover art is also different.
