= Tyll (novel) =

2017 novel by Daniel Kehlmann

- First edition (Rowohlt, 2017)
- Author: Daniel Kehlmann
- Translator: Ross Benjamin
- Language: German
- Genre: Historical
- Publisher: Rowohlt Verlag
- Publication date: October 2017
- Publication place: Germany
- English publication date: 6 February 2020
- Media type: Print (hardback)
- Pages: 473
- ISBN: 978-3-498-03567-9
- OCLC: 1006404492
- Dewey Decimal: 833/.914
- LC Class: PT2671.E32 T95 2017

Tyll is a 2017 novel, written in German, by the Austrian-German writer Daniel Kehlmann. The book is based, in part, on the folkloristic tales about Till Eulenspiegel, a jester who was the subject of a chapbook in 16th century Germany, as well as on the history of the Thirty Years' War. The book was first published in October 2017 in the original German by Rowohlt Verlag. An English translation by Ross Benjamin was published in the United States by Pantheon Books, a division of Penguin Random House, New York, in February 2020. Between its initial publication in 2017, and its publication in English, Tyll had sold almost 600,000 copies in Germany.

== Plot ==
Kehlmann does not narrate Tyll's story in a linear fashion. The chapter "Shoes" that serves as the novel's prologue tells a tale from the middle of the jester's life.

"Shoes." Deep into the Thirty Years' War Tyll Ulenspiegel arrives in a town where the war had not yet come, along with Nele, an old woman, and the donkey. The inhabitants of the town recognize Tyll from his widespread fame, even though they had never seen him before. Tyll and Nele perform to great applause. The performance culminates in a high-wire act, through which Tyll initiates a prank that causes violent upheaval.

"The Lord of the Air." This chapter presents the actual beginning of the narrative. The reader encounters his father Claus Ulenspiegel, the miller of their town, who is not like the others: he is able to read, loves books, and desires to study the mysteries of the world. Tyll's father is accused of witchcraft, which results in his trial, conviction, and execution. Knowing his prior life is now gone, Tyll asks Nele to join him as they leave the village forever.

"Zusmarshausen." It is nearly the end of the war, and it has come to the Emperor's attention that the "famous jester" (i.e. Tyll) has found shelter in the heavily damaged Andechs Abbey. The Emperor gives the task of finding Ulenspiegel and bringing him back to Vienna to the not quite 25 years old Martin von Wolkenstein.

"Kings in Winter." Elizabeth Stuart and her husband have suffered an ill fate as the King and Queen of Bohemia. During her and Friedrich's exile in The Hague in the Netherlands, a jester (Tyll) and his female companion (Nele) appear and ask for employment.

“Hunger.” After leaving their home village, Tyll and Nele are traveling with the cruel Pirmin, who is teaching the children the trade of a performer.

“The Great Art of Light and Shadow.” Kircher, a court mathematician, and an assistant join a quest for dragon's blood.

“In the Shaft.” A commandant tells Tyll he must join a unit of soldiers. Feeling he would be safe from bullets underground, Tyll chooses to become a miner.

“Westphalia.” The Winter Queen appears in Osnabrück to reclaim the electoral dignity of the Palatinate for her son.

== Characters ==
- Tyll Ulenspiegel, the son of Claus Ulenspiegel, the village miller, and Agneta. As a child, he teaches himself tightrope walking. He has to flee the village of his birth after his father has been executed for practicing witchcraft, and his friend Nele follows him. Being a natural, but also learning from the minstrel Gottfried and the crooked traveling artist Pirmin, Tyll fashions himself into a legendary jester, known all over the German-speaking lands.
- Nele, the baker's daughter. Tyll's artistic partner and travel companion.
- Origenes, a donkey Tyll taught to speak (presumably through ventriloquism) in the Winter King's stable. Tyll and Nele took him to be part of their traveling show. He and Tyll stayed together after Nele left, but separated after a later quarrel. He is now writing a book.
- Agneta, Tyll's mother
- Claus Ulenspiegel, Tyll's father. A miller.
- Dr. Athanasius Kircher, a questionable German Jesuit polymath.
- Oswald Tesimond, an English Jesuit, involved in the Gunpowder Plot in 1605. Traveling Germany together with Dr. Kircher.
- Tilman, torturer and hangman. He is also a man of healing who shows kindness to the condemned, in hopes of forgiveness.
- Gottfried, kind-hearted balladeer who is not good at his trade. He is present at the trial and execution of Claus. Later he encounters Nele and Tyll in the forest. They travel with him until reaching the next market town, where they abandon him.
- Pirmin, the traveling artist. As they are traveling and performing with the minstrel Gottfried, Tyll convinces Nele to follow Pirmin, because he believes that they are able to learn a lot from the artist. When Pirmin's abuse becomes unbearable to them, Nele poisons Pirmin with a dish of mushrooms.
- Frederick V. of the Palatinate, King of Bohemia, "the Winter King."
- Elizabeth Stuart, his wife, "the Winter Queen". The daughter of King James VI and I, ruler of Scotland, England & Ireland.
- Adam Olearius, a German scholar, widely traveled during his lifetime. Court mathematician of the Duke of Holstein-Gottorp. Accompanies Kircher on a mission to track down the last dragon, in order to find a cure for the plague. Kircher disappears quickly on the journey after an encounter with Tyll who recognizes him as one of the men responsible for the wrongful indictment and death of Tyll's father.
- Paul Fleming, Olearius’s assistant. A doctor who becomes an acclaimed German language poet.
- Martin von Wolkenstein, "the corpulent Duke." A fictional character, crafted by Kehlmann. The Duke is a writer, to which his name and his fictional lineage (being a descendant of Oswald von Wolkenstein) refers. In the last year of the war, the Emperor in Vienna tasks Martin with finding the famous jester in his hiding place at the monastery of Andechs and bringing him to safety at the Imperial court. Tyll ends up saving Martin von Wolkenstein's life during the Battle of Zusmarshausen.
- Martha, a twelve year old girl in the prologue. Tyll and Nele perform in her town, and Tyll plays the prank with the shoes from the "4th History" of the chap book.

== Critical reception ==
The reception of the novel upon its publication in the German-speaking countries was largely positive. Roman Bucheli of the Neue Zürcher Zeitung called Kehlmann's novel a "masterpiece". The critic claims that the book is "more than a novel" because it has chosen "wit and reason," as well as "art and knowledge" as its allies.

Equally enthusiastic was Christoph Bartmann of the Süddeutsche Zeitung Munich, who sees in Kehlmann's Tyll his best book since his bestselling novel Measuring the World, that appeared in 2005, twelve years earlier.

The novel was published in the United States in a translation by Ross Benjamin, a translator known for translations of novels by Friedrich Hölderlin and Joseph Roth, as well as the diaries by Franz Kafka.

Simon Ings of The Times denotes Tyll as "a laugh-outloud-then-weep-into-your-beer comic novel about a war." He goes on to emphasize the parallels between Kehlmann's novel, which the writer bases on transferring Till Eulenspiegel's story into the era of the Thirty Years' War, and another novel actually written about that exact same era and published twenty years after the end of the war, Simplicius Simplicissimus by Hans Jakob Christoffel von Grimmelshausen (1668).

Reviewing Kehlmann's novel for the Washington Post, the novelist Jon Michaud comments on the structure of Tyll: "Each chapter functions as a self-contained short story or novella with recurring themes and characters tying the whole together. Some are more successful than others, and the best are transfixing."

== Awards ==
- 2018: Friedrich-Hölderlin-Preis: "Sein Roman Tyll macht die legendäre Gauklerfigur des Eulenspiegel zum Zeitzeugen des Dreißigjährigen Krieges und schafft damit eine epische Studie über Religion, Aberglauben, Machtpolitik und Krieg sowie einen abgründig komischen Künstlerroman: ein sprachmächtiges, ernstes und leichtfüßiges Meisterwerk, das der Historie neue, bis in die Gegenwart weisende Erkenntnisse abliest." (Engl. "[Kehlmann's] novel Tyll turns Eulenspiegel, the legendary jester figure, into a historical witness to the Thirty Years' War, and thereby creates an epic study on religion, superstition, power politics, and war, as well as into an inscrutably comical artist's novel: a linguistically powerful, profound, and lightly flowing masterpiece which gains new insights from history which reach as far as the present day.")
- 2020: Longlist of the International Booker Prize for Ross Benjamin's English translation of Kehlmann's Tyll.
