= Foyer des Arts =

German pop band

- Origin: Germany
- Genres: Neue Deutsche Welle; New wave
- Years active: 1978–1995
- Labels: WEA (Warner Music); Fünfundvierzig
- Past members: Max Goldt; Gerd Pasemann

Foyer des Arts was a German experimental pop duo founded in 1981 consisting of Max Goldt (vocals, lyrics) and Gerd Pasemann (instruments). They released four original albums between 1981 and 1995, but were on hiatus for most of that time. Today, they are primarily remembered for their minor hit "Wissenswertes über Erlangen" (1982) as well as being the springboard for the career of Max Goldt, who emerged as a successful humorous writer in the 1990s.

== Discography ==
=== Albums ===
- 1981: Die seltsame Sekretärin
- 1982: Von Bullerbü nach Babylon
- 1986: Die Unfähigkeit zu frühstücken
- 1988: Ein Kuß in der Irrtumstaverne
- 1989: Was ist super?
- 1995: Die Menschen
- 2000: Könnten Bienen fliegen – Das Beste von Foyer des Arts
- 2022: Die John-Peel-Session (EP)

=== Singles ===
- 1981: "Eine Königin mit Rädern untendran"
- 1982: "Wissenswertes über Erlangen"
- 1982: "Trends"
- 1984: "Ein Haus aus den Knochen von Cary Grant"
- 1985: "Schimmliges Brot"
- 1986: "Gleichzeitig? Das kann ich nicht"
- 1988: "Penis → Vagina"
