= Ulrich Horstmann =

German literary scholar and writer (born 1949)

Ulrich Horstmann (born 31 May 1949 in Bünde) is a German literary scholar and writer who has also written under the pseudonym Klaus Steintal. Frequently described as a philosopher in the tradition of philosophical pessimism, he is perhaps most notorious for his view, often regarded as extreme even among other pessimist philosophers, that voluntary human extinction ought to be achieved by way of intentional global thermonuclear annihilation. Horstmann developed an idea of anthropofugal (from greek "anthropo" - human, "fuga" - fleeing) thinking in his philosophical essay "Das Untier" (1983) (literally meaning "The Beast").

== Life ==
Ulrich Horstmann finished his studies of English and Philosophy in 1974 with a doctoral thesis on Edgar Allan Poe. He was a lecturer at the University of South Africa in Pretoria. After habilitation in 1983 he lectured at the University of Münster until 1987. Since 1991 he has been a professor of English and American literature at the University of Giessen. He lives in Marburg.

Since 1976 Ulrich Horstmann has published, alongside scientific work, essays, novels and plays of his own, as well as translations from English. In 1983 he became known for his treatise The Beast, in which he promoted a philosophical position which was diametrically opposed to the peace movement Zeitgeist of those years: He advocated a philosophy of "escape of mankind" which aims for an early self-destruction of the human race by means of the accumulated nuclear weapons found in arsenals around the world. He pushed the pessimism and misanthropy of his intellectual forebear Schopenhauer to the extreme. It has been proved by the author's subsequent publications which are written with an attitude of nihilism and extreme distaste for the world, that The Beast was in no way, as suspected by some critics, a particularly bitter satire.

Ulrich Horstmann is a member of PEN Germany and received the Kleist Prize in 1988 after being nominated by Günter Kunert.

== Thought ==
Horstmann puts forth the theory that mankind has been pre-programmed to eliminate itself in the course of history—and also all its memory of itself—through war (thermonuclear, genetic, biological), genocide, destruction of its sustaining environment, etc. “The final aim of history is a crumbling field of ruins. Its final meaning is the sand blown through the eye-holes of human skulls.” Through his analysis of history, he has concluded that our species is engaged in a constant process of armament, with the eventual end goal of wiping itself out through war. History, for him, is nothing more than a slaughterhouse . . . “the place of a skull and charnel house of a mad, incurably bloodthirsty slaughtering, flaying and whetting, of an irresistible urge to destroy to the last.” Although inspired by the already extreme philosophy of Philipp Mainländer, Horstmann ends up with an even more explicit solution regarding the problem of human existence. In his book The Beast he actually goes so far as to suggest the use of nuclear weapons in order to bring forth the extinction of the human race. For him only the annihilation of life would give rise to a universal redemption in which we would once again achieve the existential peace of inorganic matter. According to Horstmann’s apocalyptic vision, the true Garden of Eden is desolation:

Die Geschichte des Untiers ist erfüllt, und in Demut harrt es des doppelten Todes — der physischen Vernichtung und des Auslöschens der Erinnerung an sich selbst. The history of the Beast is fulfilled, and in humility it awaits a double death — the physical annihilation and the obliteration of the recollection to itself.
— Das Untier (The Beast)

== Works ==
- Ansätze zu einer technomorphen Theorie der Dichtung bei Edgar Allan Poe, Bern 1975. ISBN 3-261-01741-4. Approaches to a Technomorph Theory of Edgar Allan Poe’s Poetry.
- Wortkadavericon oder kleine thermonukleare Versschule für jedermann, Cologne 1977. ISBN 3-88097-052-1. Wordcadavericon or Small Thermonuclear Verse School for Everyone.
- Steintals Vandalenpark. Erzählung, Siegen 1981. ISBN 3-922524-04-4. Steintal's Vandal Park. Narrative.
- Ästhetizismus und Dekadenz. Zum Paradigmakonflikt in der englischen Literaturtheorie des späten 19. Jahrhunderts, Munich 1983. ISBN 3-7705-2098-X. Aestheticism and Decadence. On the Paradigm Conflict in Late 19th-Century English Literary Theory.
- Parakritik und Dekonstruktion. Eine Einführung in den amerikanischen Poststrukturalismus, Würzburg 1983. ISBN 3-88479-131-1. Paracriticism and Deconstruction: An Introduction to American Poststructuralism.
- Das Untier, Vienna 1983. ISBN 3-88602-075-4. (Reprint Warendorf 2004. ISBN 3-936345-47-3.) The Beast. Outlines of a Philosophy of Human Flight.
- Hirnschlag. Aphorismen, Abtestate, Berserkasmen, Göttingen 1984. ISBN 3-88694-501-4. Brain Stroke. Aphorisms, Abtestates, Berserkasms.
- Das Glück von OmB'assa, Phantastischer Roman. Frankfurt am Main 1985. ISBN 3-518-37588-1. The Luck of OmB'assa, Fantastic Novel.
- Der lange Schatten der Melancholie. Versuch über ein angeschwärztes Gefühl, Essen 1985. ISBN 3-924368-24-4. The Long Shadow of Melancholy. An Essay on a Blackened Feeling.
- Schwedentrunk. Gedichte, Frankfurt am Main 1989. ISBN 3-596-22362-8. Swedish Drink. Poems.
- Patzer. Roman, Zurich 1990. ISBN 3-251-00165-5. Blunder. Novel.
- Ansichten vom Großen Umsonst, Gütersloh 1991. ISBN 3-579-01114-6. Views from the Great Freebie.
- Infernodrom: Programm-Mitschnitte aus dreizehn Jahren, Paderborn 1994. ISBN 3-927104-82-5. Infernodrom: Programme Recordings from Thirteen Years.
- Altstadt mit Skins. Gedichte, Paderborn 1995. ISBN 3-927104-96-5. Old Town with Skins. Poems.
- Konservatorium: Geschichten über kurz oder lang, Paderborn 1995. ISBN 3-89621-017-3. Conservatory: Stories About Short or Long.
- Beschwörung Schattenreich, Paderborn 1996. ISBN 3-89621-036-X. (Collected plays and radio plays from 1978 until 1990). Summoning Shadow Realm.
- Einfallstor. Neue Aphorismen, Oldenburg 1998. ISBN 3-89621-065-3. Gateway. New Aphorisms.
- Jeffers-Meditationen oder die Poesie als Abwendungskunst, Heidelberg 1998. ISBN 3-930978-10-5. Jeffers-Meditations or Poetry as the Art of Distraction.
- Abdrift: Neue Essays, Oldenburg 2000. ISBN 3-89621-103-X. Drift: New Essays.
- Göttinnen, leicht verderblich. Gedichte, Oldenburg 2000. ISBN 3-89621-106-4. Goddesses, Easily Perishable. Poems.
- J. Ein Halbweltroman, Oldenburg 2002. ISBN 3-89621-138-2. J. A Demi-Monde Novel.
- Ausgewiesene Experten: Kunstfeindschaft in der Literaturtheorie des 20. Jahrhunderts, Frankfurt am Main 2003. ISBN 3-631-50887-5. Renowned Experts: Hostility Towards Art in 20th-Century Literary Theory.
- Picknick am Schlagfluß. Gedichte, Oldenburg, 2005. ISBN 3-89621-204-4. Picnic by the Stroke. Poems.
