= Carol Brown Janeway =

Scottish editor and literary translator into English (1944 – 2015)

- Born: 1 February 1944 Edinburgh, Scotland, UK
- Died: 3 August 2015 (aged 71) New York City
- Occupation: Editor, translator

Carol Janet Brown Janeway (1 February 1944 – 3 August 2015) was a Scottish-American editor and literary translator into English. She is best known for her translation of Bernhard Schlink's The Reader.

== Biography ==
Carol Janet Brown was born in Edinburgh, Scotland. Her father Robin Brown was a chartered accountant, while her mother was a director of the Ranfurly Library, specialising in the translation of medieval French and German lyrics. She attended St George's School, Edinburgh and went on to study modern and medieval languages at Girton College, Cambridge. After graduating with a first-class degree, she worked at John Farquharson, a literary agency in London.

In 1970 she moved to New York, where she joined the publisher Alfred A. Knopf. She became a senior editor, responsible for purchasing publishing rights from international publishers, and began her parallel career in literary translation, mainly from German.

Among the authors Janeway edited was George MacDonald Fraser. She also published Heinrich Böll, Imre Kertész, Thomas Mann, José Donoso, Ivan Klima, Yukio Mishima, Elsa Morante, Robert Musil and Patrick Süskind.

An early translation by Janeway was Das Boot by Lothar-Günther Buchheim. Her translations of The Reader by Bernhard Schlink and Embers by Sandor Marai were lauded.

== Personal life ==
Her first marriage to William H. Janeway was dissolved. Later, she married Erwin Glikes, who died in 1994.

== Death ==
She died of cancer on 3 August 2015, aged 71, in New York City.

== Selected translations ==
=== From German ===
- My Prizes, by Thomas Bernhard
- The Reader, by Bernhard Schlink
- Summer Lies, by Bernhard Schlink
- Embers, by Sándor Márai
- Crime, by Ferdinand von Schirach
- Guilt, by Ferdinand von Schirach
- Measuring the World, by Daniel Kehlmann
- Fame, by Daniel Kehlmann
- F, by Daniel Kehlmann
- Me and Kaminski, by Daniel Kehlmann
- Fragments: Memories of a Wartime Childhood, by Binjamin Wilkomirski
- Ostend: Stefan Zweig, Joseph Roth, and the Summer Before the Dark, by Volker Weidermann

=== From Yiddish ===
- Yosl Rakover Talks to God, by Zvi Kolitz.

=== From Dutch ===
- The Storm, by Margriet de Moor

=== From French ===
- Desolation, by Yasmina Reza
- Dawn Dusk or Night: My Year With Nicolas Sarkozy, by Yasmina Reza

== Awards ==
- 2013 Friedrich Ulfers Prize for translations of German literature.
- 2014 Ottaway Award for the Promotion of International Literature.
