= Max Goldt =

German satirical author and musician (born 1958)

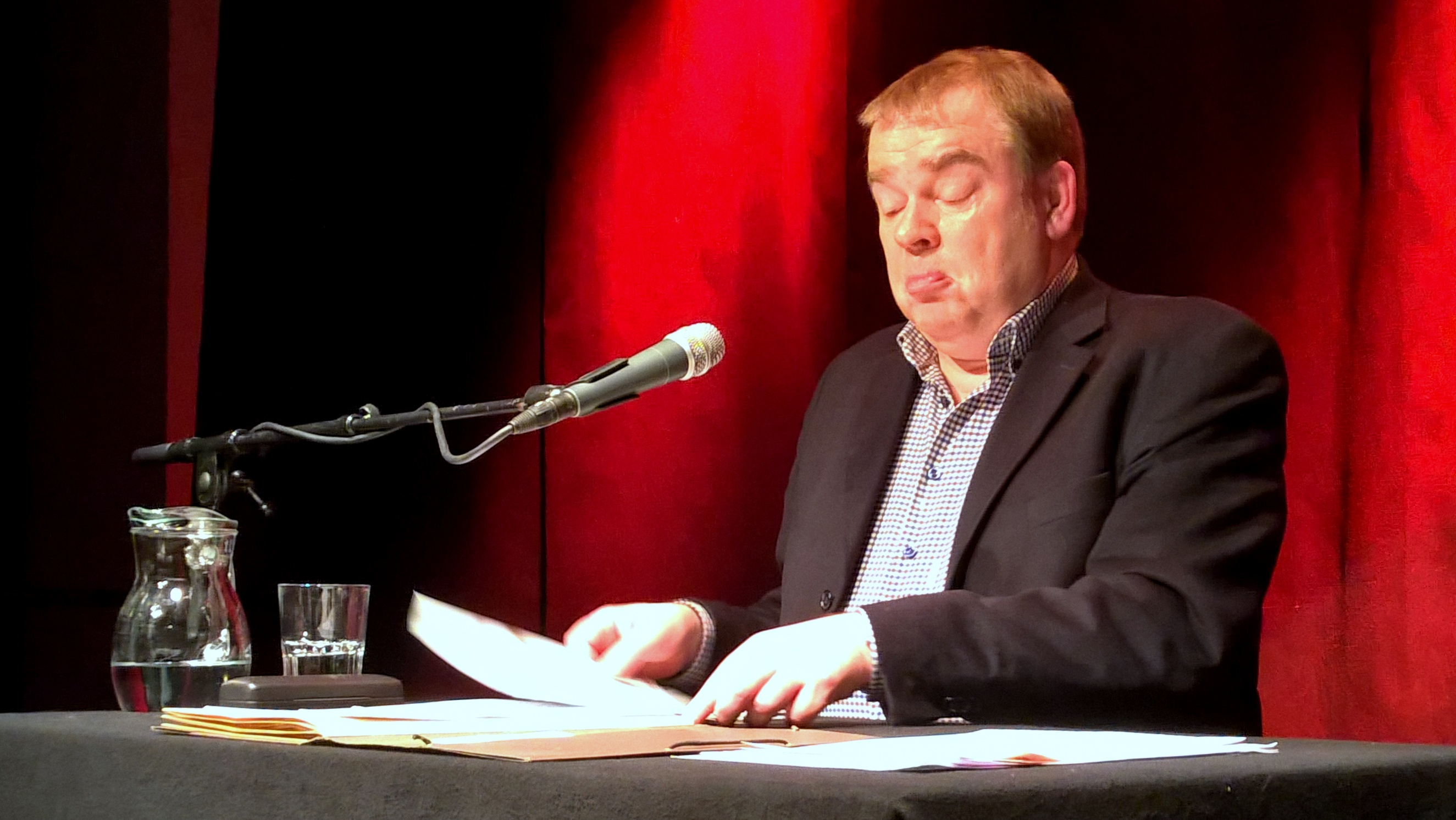

Background information
- Born: Matthias Ernst; 23 November 1958 (age 67)
- Origin: Germany
- Occupations: Author, singer

Max Goldt (pseudonym of Matthias Ernst) (born 23 November 1958) is a German writer, columnist and musician.

== Early life ==
Goldt was born in the town of Weende, now Göttingen, to working-class parents originally from Silesia. In 1977, he moved to West Berlin to avoid conscription. He started training as a photographer, but soon turned to making music full-time, working in various daytime jobs to support himself, including as a tourist guide. It was during this time that he chose the pseudonym Max Goldt. In 1989, Goldt married East German performance artist Else Gabriel, enabling Gabriel to leave the GDR.

== Career ==
In 1978, Goldt joined Gerd Pasemann to form the core of the underground band Aroma Plus, who issued two self-released albums before disbanding. In 1981 Goldt and Pasemann formed the duo Foyer des Arts, with Goldt providing lyrics and vocals. Foyer des Arts was signed by Warner Music's German branch WEA and enjoyed moderate commercial during the New German Wave. Their only hit (#36 on the West German singles chart) was Wissenswertes über Erlangen ("Things Worth Knowing About Erlangen"), a satirical take at Goldt's experience as a tourist guide (1982). Although Foyer des Arts did not formally disband until 1995, they were on hiatus most of the time and Goldt started to home record solo albums with experimental, often instrumental music and as well as Sprechgesang and spoken word tracks with background music and various effects. Goldt also published much of the (often quite bizarre) lyrics as books.

From 1987, Goldt had a regular column in the Berlin underground magazine Ich und mein Staubsauger ("Me and my vacuum cleaner"), in which he wrote more "straightforward" yet humorous essays with a distinctive style. After the magazine's demise in 1988, Goldt's column began to appear in Titanic, Germany's premier satirical magazine, on a monthly basis. The change marked the beginning of Goldt's second career as a writer of essays. The column appeared under varying headlines (Aus Onkel Max’ Kulturtagebuch ["From Uncle Max's cultural diary"], Diese Kolumne hat vorübergehend keinen Namen ["This column is temporarily without a name"], Manfred Meyer berichtet aus Stuttgart ["Manfred Meyer reporting from Stuttgart"], and Informationen für Erwachsene ["Information for adults"]. Regularly reprinted (some in revised form) in book format, these essays established Goldt as a major author. Goldt regularly travels the German-speaking areas reading from his books, often drawing large crowds. Recordings from these performances have been released on a series of compact discs. Apart from that, he continues to record music (in the broadest sense), solo and with Stephan Winkler (as NUUK).

In 1998, Goldt suspended his regular contributions to Titanic, although one-off articles continued to appear, but eventually resumed them in 2005. Since 1996, Goldt has cooperated with cartoonist Stephan Katz as the cartoon duo Katz & Goldt. Their comic strips have appeared in Titanic, Die Zeit and in a series of books. In 2008, on the recommendation of Daniel Kehlmann, he was awarded the Kleist Prize. Since the 2010s, Goldt suffers from writer's block but continues to write comic scenarios.

== Style ==
Max Goldt's writing style is characterised by an ironic perspective on familiar aspects of everyday life; creative use of language, often combined with a critique of linguistic conventions in journalese and everyday language; frequent references to pop culture; ambiguity as to whether or not the narrator is relating the first-hand experience, opinions and sentiments of the author.

== Awards ==
- 1997 Kassel Literary Prize
- 2008 Kleist Prize
- 2008 Hugo Ball Prize

== Solo discography ==
see Foyer des Arts for more

=== Music ===
- Die majestätische Ruhe des Anorganischen, ARO 007, 1984
- Restaurants, Restaurants, Restaurants. Zweiundzwanzig hysterische Miniaturen, TEAM records, 1986
- Die Radiotrinkerin & Die legendäre letzte Zigarette, Fünfundvierzig, 1990
- Nirgendwo Fichtenkreuzschnäbel, überall Fichtenkreuzschnäbel, Fünfundvierzig, 1993
- Musik wird niemals langsam (with Michael Dubach und Nino Sandow), Fünfundvierzig, 1994
- Ende Juli, Anfang August (streng limitiertes Schlauchalbum mit Heimaufnahmen 1982 – 1989), LP, Hidden Records, 1994
- Alte Pilze (Historische Heimaufnahmen 1981 – 1992 Volume II, LP, Hidden Records, 1996
- Legasthenie im Abendwind (Historische Heimaufnahmen 1981 – 1995 Volume III), LP, Hidden Records, 1997
- Nuuk (Stephan Winkler and Max Goldt): Nachts in schwarzer Seilbahn nach Waldpotsdam, Traumton (CD) / Hidden Records (Vinyl), 1998
- Bundesratsufer. Instrumentals, Captain Trip Records, 1999

=== Spoken word recordings ===
- Die sonderbare Zwitter-CD (Lese-Live Eins), Fünfundvierzig, 1993
- Die CD mit dem Kaffeeringecover (Lese-Live Zwei), Fünfundvierzig, 1994
- Weihnachten im Bordell (Lese-Live Drei), Fünfundvierzig, 1995
- Objekt mit Souvenircharakter (Lese-Live Vier), Fünfundvierzig, 1996
- Schöne Greatest Lese Live Oldies – Komische Appläuse Motor, 1997
- Das kellerliterarische Riesenrad (mit Ditterich von Euler-Donnersperg), Fünfundvierzig, 1998
- Die Aschenbechergymnastik, Raben Records/Heyne 2000
- Der Krapfen auf dem Sims, Heyne Hörbuch, 2001, ISBN 3-453-19096-3
- Okay Mutter, ich nehme die Mittagsmaschine., Hörbuch München, 2002, ISBN 3-453-16783-X
- Wenn man einen weißen Anzug anhat und anderes, Hörbuch Hamburg, 2003, ISBN 3-89903-118-0
- Für Nächte am offenen Fenster. Luxusprosa aus den neunziger Jahren, Hörbuch Hamburg, 2003, ISBN 3-89903-123-7
- Für Nächte am offenen Fenster. Zweite Folge-besser als die erste, Hörbuch Hamburg, 2004, ISBN 3-89903-156-3
- Ein Leben auf der Flucht vor der Koralle , Hörbuch Hamburg, 2005, ISBN 3-89903-186-5
- Vom Zauber des seitlich dran Vorbeigehens, Hörbuch Hamburg, 2005, ISBN 3-89903-187-3
- 'ne Nonne kauft 'ner Nutte 'nen Duden. Dreizehn Texte 1991–2005 , Hörbuch Hamburg, 2006, ISBN 3-89903-236-5
- QQ – Quiet Quality, Hörbuch Hamburg, 2007, ISBN 978-3-89903-409-7
- Nichts als Punk und Pils und Staatsverdruß, Hörbuch Hamburg, 2008, ISBN 978-3-89903-490-5

== Books ==
=== Essays and prose ===
- Mein äußerst schwer erziehbarer schwuler Schwager aus der Schweiz, a-verbal, 1984, ISBN 3-88999-003-7
- Ungeduscht, geduzt und ausgebuht, a-verbal, 1988, ISBN 3-88999-006-1
- Die Radiotrinkerin (Foreword by Robert Gernhardt), Haffmans Verlag, 1991, ISBN 3-251-01112-X
- Quitten für die Menschen zwischen Emden und Zittau, Haffmans Verlag, 1993, ISBN 3-251-30008-3
- Schließ einfach die Augen und stell dir vor, ich wäre Heinz Kluncker, Haffmans Verlag, 1994, ISBN 3-251-30044-X
- Die Kugeln in unseren Köpfen, Haffmans Verlag, 1995, ISBN 3-251-00275-9
- Der Sommerverächter, Delius & Company, 1996, ISBN 3-931870-10-3 (Literacard Nr. 11)
- Ä, Haffmans Verlag, 1997, ISBN 3-251-30065-2
- Ein gelbes Plastikthermometer in Form eines rotten Plastikfisches (Typography by Martin Z. Schröder), Revonnah Verlag, 1998, ISBN 3-927715-87-5
- 'Mind-boggling' – Evening Post. Kolumnen Nr. 96 – 108, some other stuff, acht unpaginierte Farbseiten, etliche s/w-Abbildungen sowie zwei Zeichnungen von Katz und Goldt, Haffmans Verlag, 1998, ISBN 3-251-00405-0
- Erntedankfäscht (zusammen mit Gerhard Henschel), Haffmans Verlag, 1998, ISBN 3-251-00389-5
- (ed.) Der Rabe – Magazin für jede Art von Literatur – Nummer 57, Haffmans Verlag, 1999, ISBN 3-251-10057-2
- Der Krapfen auf dem Sims – Betrachtungen, Essays u. a., Alexander Fest Verlag, Berlin 2001, ISBN 3-8286-0156-1
- Okay Mutter, ich nehme die Mittagsmaschine – Beste Kolumnen und beste Nicht-Kolumnen in einem Band, Haffmans Verlag, 2001, ISBN 3-251-00458-1
- Wenn man einen weißen Anzug anhat. Ein Tagebuch-Buch, Rowohlt, 2002, ISBN 3-498-02493-0
- Für Nächte am offenen Fenster. Die prachtvollsten Texte von 1988 – 2002, Rowohlt, 2003, ISBN 3-498-02496-5
- Ein Leben auf der Flucht vor der Koralle, Rowohlt, 2004, ISBN 3-499-23540-4
- Vom Zauber des seitlich dran Vorbeigehens, Rowohlt, 2005, ISBN 3-498-02497-3
- QQ, Rowohlt Berlin, 2007, ISBN 3-87134-581-4

=== Comic books ===
(with Stephan Katz, "Katz und Goldt")

- Wenn Adoptierte den Tod ins Haus bringen, Jochen Enterprises, 1997, ISBN 3-930486-30-X
- Koksen um die Mäuse zu vergessen, Jochen Enterprises, 1998
- Ich Ratten, Jochen Enterprises, 1999
- Oh, Schlagsahne! Hier müssen Menschen sein. Carlsen Comics, 2001, ISBN 3-551-75823-9
- Das Salz in der Las Vegas-Eule, Carlsen Comics, 2002, ISBN 3-551-75825-5
- Adieu Sweet Bahnhof, Rowohlt Verlag 2004, ISBN 3-499-23896-9
- Das Malträtieren unvollkommener Automaten, Rowohlt Verlag 2006, ISBN 3-499-24134-X
- Der Globus ist unser Pony, der Kosmos unser richtiges Pferd, Edition Moderne 2007, ISBN 3-03731-015-4
- Wellness rettet den Bindestrich, Edition Moderne 2008, ISBN 978-3-03731-037-3
- Unglück mit allerlei Toten. Edition Moderne 2010, ISBN 978-3-03731-068-7.
- Katz und Goldt sowie der Berliner Fernsehturm aus der Sicht von jemandem, der zu faul ist, seinen Kaktus beiseite zu schieben. Edition Moderne 2012, ISBN 978-3-03731-094-6.
- Der Baum ist köstlich, Graf Zeppelin. Edition Moderne 2014, ISBN 978-3-03731-123-3.
- Lust auf etwas Perkussion, mein kleiner Wuschel? Edition Moderne 2016, ISBN 978-3-03731-151-6.
- Das vierzehnte Buch dieser beiden Herren, Edition Moderne 2018, ISBN 978-3-03731-183-7.
- Ohrfeige links, Ohrfeige rechts – Flegeljahre einer Psychotherapeutin, Edition Moderne 2020, ISBN 978-3-03731-204-9.
