= Me and Kaminski (film) =

2015 film

- German theatrical release poster
- German: Ich und Kaminski
- Directed by: Wolfgang Becker
- Screenplay by: Thomas Wendrich
- Based on: Me and Kaminski by Daniel Kehlmann
- Produced by: Uwe Schott; Wolfgang Becker
- Starring: Daniel Brühl; Jesper Christensen; Amira Casar; Denis Lavant; Jördis Triebel; Geraldine Chaplin
- Cinematography: Jürgen Jürges
- Edited by: Peter R. Adam
- Music by: Lorenz Dangel
- Production companies: X-Filme Creative Pool; ED Productions Sprl
- Distributed by: X Verleih
- Release date: 17 September 2015 (Germany)
- Running time: 124 minutes
- Countries: Germany; Belgium
- Language: German

Me and Kaminski (German: Ich und Kaminski) is a 2015 comedy drama film directed by Wolfgang Becker from a screenplay by Thomas Wendrich, based on the 2003 novel by Daniel Kehlmann. It tells the story of a young writer who hopes to make his reputation and fortune by publishing a biography of one of the greatest 20th-century painters, now blind and living in total seclusion. It was released in Germany on 17 September 2015 by X Verleih.

== Plot ==
Sebastian Zöllner, a cocky young writer, travels to the Swiss Alps to interview Manuel Kaminski, a legend among 20th-century painters, who knew everybody in the art world but lost his sight and withdrew from all contact. Zöllner's idea is to have a biography ready the moment Kaminski is dead.

Kaminski is looked after by a wary daughter Miriam, who insists on being at interviews, and a dim housekeeper. While the daughter is out, Zöllner bribes the housekeeper to leave the house and he starts exploring. In the desk he finds letters to Kaminski from friends like Matisse and Picasso, and pockets some. In the basement he finds a secret studio with huge self-portraits, two of which he rolls up and keeps.

But he needs to get Kaminski on his own, so he tells the old man that his great love Therese, who the world thought dead, is in fact living in the north. Kaminski gives him the keys to his Jaguar and the two set off, but at a service station the car is stolen (and hidden in it the paintings Zöllner had stolen). Continuing by taxi, they stop at a shabby hotel where Kaminski, free of Miriam's control, orders a huge meal and a prostitute.

Arriving at the house of the ancient Therese, all she wants to talk about is grandchildren and TV programs. She does however admit that she spoke extensively to another writer, who has a biography of Kaminski ready for publication. As the disappointed pair leave, Miriam is outside in the recovered Jaguar, into which she bundles her father. Zöllner asks if he can quickly say a private goodbye to the old man and, as soon as Miriam gets out, roars off with Kaminski.

The old man says he'd like to go to the seaside, and the two paddle happily in the surf. Relaxing afterwards on the sand, after signing the two canvases Zöllner had stolen, Kaminski hints that the young man should give up his quest and leave him alone. Zöllner takes the hint and, after throwing his notes, tapes, and camera into the sea, disappears with the canvases over the dunes. The solitary old man on the beach slowly changes into one of his self-portraits.

== Cast ==
- Daniel Brühl as Sebastian Zöllner
- Jesper Christensen as Manuel Kaminski
- Amira Casar as Miriam Kaminski
- Geraldine Chaplin as Therese
- Denis Lavant as Karl-Ludwig
- Bruno Cathomas as Golo Moser
- Jördis Triebel as Elke
- Jan Decleir as Holm
- Karl Markovics as Komponistenzwillinge
- Viviane de Muynck as Anna
- Milan Peschel as Eugen Manz
- Stefan Kurt as Bogovich
- Josef Hader as Zugbegleiter
- Patrick Bauchau as Prof. Megelbach
