= Dorsten =

- Town
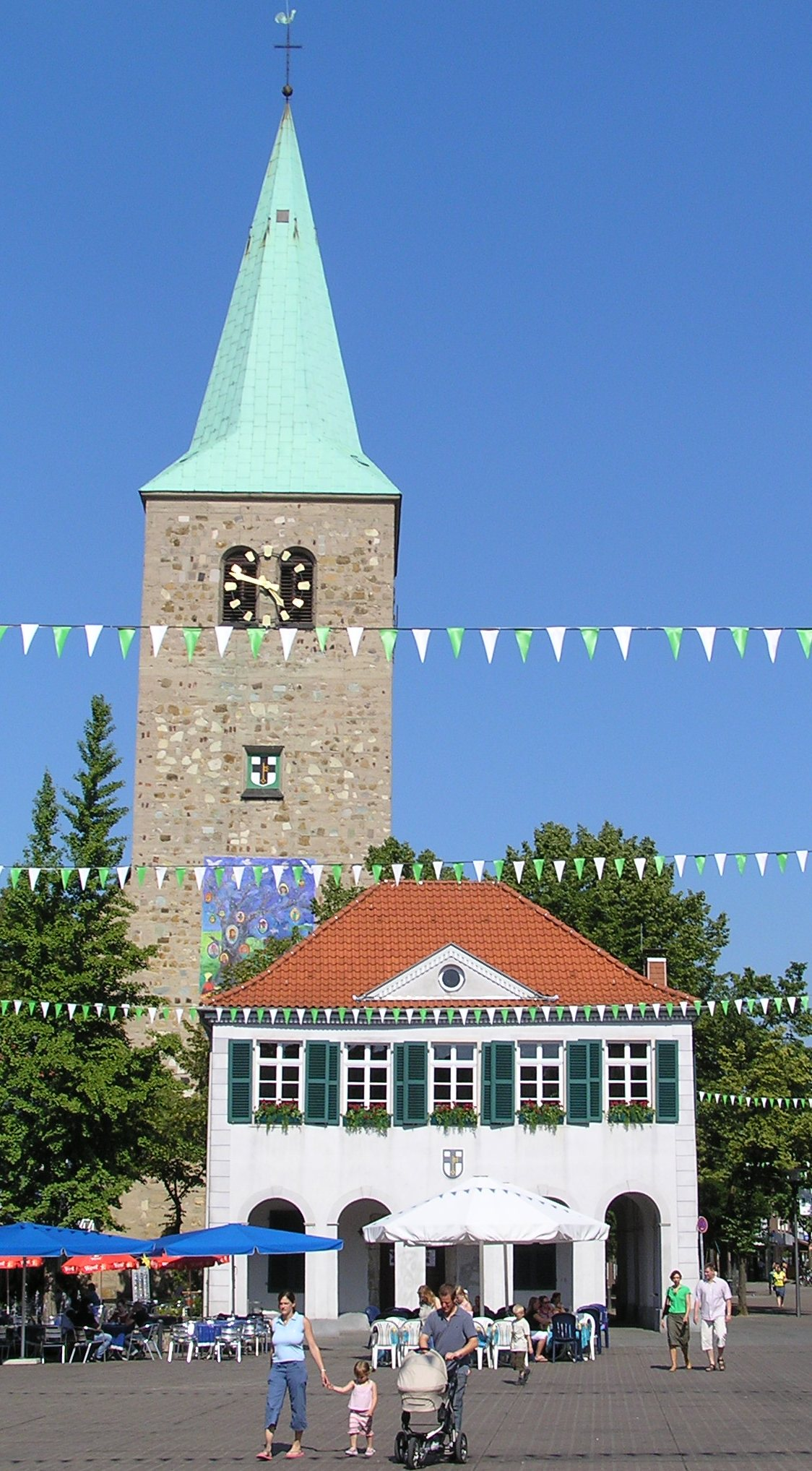
- Historical town hall and St. Agatha cathedral

- Coat of arms

- Location of Dorsten within Recklinghausen district
- Interactive map of Dorsten
- Location within Germany Location within North Rhine-Westphalia
- Coordinates: 51°39′36″N 6°57′51″E
- Country: Germany
- State: North Rhine-Westphalia
- Admin. region: Münster
- District: Recklinghausen

Government
  - Mayor (2025–30): Tobias Stockhoff (CDU)
  - Governing parties: CDU

Area
  - Total: 171.2 km^{2} (66.1 sq mi)
- Elevation: 74 m (243 ft)

Population (2025-12-31)
  - Total: 74,783
  - Density: 436.8/km^{2} (1,131/sq mi)
- Time zone: UTC+01:00 (CET)
  - Summer (DST): UTC+02:00 (CEST)
- Postal codes: 46282, 46284, 46286
- Dialling codes: 02362, 02369, 02866
- Vehicle registration: RE
- Website: www.dorsten.de

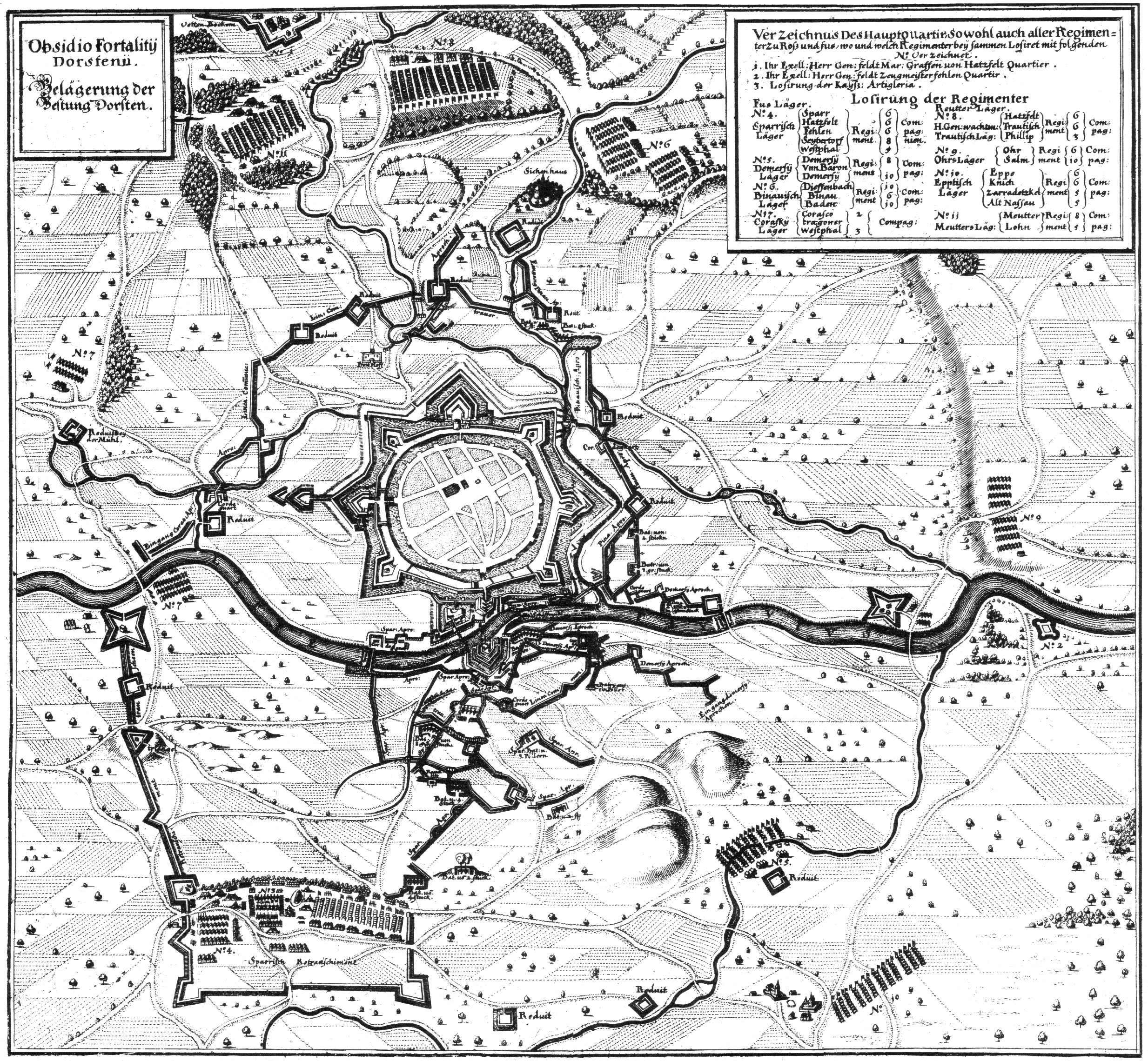
Dorsten in 1641

Dorsten (German pronunciation: [ˈdɔʁstn̩]; Westphalian: Dössen) is a town in the Recklinghausen district of the German state of North Rhine-Westphalia. Dorsten has a population of about 75,000.

Dorsten is situated on the western rim of Westphalia bordering the Rhineland. Its historical old town lies on the south bank of the river Lippe and the Wesel–Datteln Canal and was granted city rights in 1251. During the twentieth century, the town was enlarged in its north by the villages of the former Herrlichkeit Lembeck. While Dorsten's northern districts are thus shaped by the rural Münsterland with its many historical castles, just south of the town the Ruhr region begins, Germany's largest urban agglomeration with more than seven million inhabitants.

The exact linguistic derivation of the word "Dorsten" is unknown, leaving the meaning of the town's name unclear.

== History ==
Archaeological findings show that the area was already populated during the Neolithic and Bronze Ages, from about 4000 BC onwards. The Romans established a military camp in Dorsten-Holsterhausen in 11 BC and Varus passed through it in 9 BC on his way to the Battle of the Teutoburg Forest.

From around 700 AD onwards, the Archbishopric of Cologne began to evangelise the area around Dorsten. Archbishop Konrad von Hochstaden, together with the Count of Cleves, granted Dorsten the city rights in 1251. Due to its economically favourable position on the river Lippe, the town became a member of the Hanseatic League of international trading cities and turned into the richest town in the Vest Recklinghausen.

In 1488, Franciscan friars established a friary which continues to exist today as the world's oldest permanently existing cloister of this order. The monks founded Gymnasium Petrinum in 1642 and in 1699 the Ursulines set up a cloister including a boarding school for girls. However, the Thirty Years' War (1618–48), the Hessian War and the continuous occupation by various forces badly derogated Dorsten's medieval wealth. On 9 February 1633, Hesse-Cassel captured the town of Dorsten without resistance from the Electorate of Cologne and the Vest of Recklinghausen and, in the years that followed, it was turned into the strongest fortress in the region. As a result, attempts were made to recapture it. The first siege in 1636 was unsuccessful, but in 1641, a second Siege of Dorsten resulted in considerable destruction of the town and the eventual surrender of the garrison.

It was only during the Industrial Revolution of the nineteenth century that Dorsten returned to its former prosperity. Spinning, weaving and metal casting industries found their way into town and in 1912, the first coal mine opened. Between 1929 and 1975, surrounding villages became districts of the gradually enlarging town of Dorsten. Only a few days before the end of the Second World War, the historical old town was almost completely destroyed in an Allied air raid. 319 people died in the air raids on Dorsten and 700 families were made homeless. However, after 1945, the town's centre was rebuilt on its historical foundations and thus still resembles its medieval shape today.

Dorsten is widely known today for its Jewish Museum of Westphalia which was established in 1987. In 2001, the last coal mine closed and the town celebrated its 750th jubilee with a festival in the old town.

== Population ==
Historical population

Year	Pop.	±% p.a.
1965	52,438	—
1970	58,238	+2.12%
1975	65,707	+2.44%
1980	70,275	+1.35%
1985	72,946	+0.75%
1990	78,035	+1.36%
1995	80,735	+0.68%

Year	Pop.	±% p.a.
2000	81,063	+0.08%
2005	79,639	−0.35%
2010	76,775	−0.73%
2015	75,431	−0.35%
2020	74,515	−0.24%
2025	74,783	+0.07%

Source: Landesdatabank Nordrhein-Westfalen

== Gallery ==
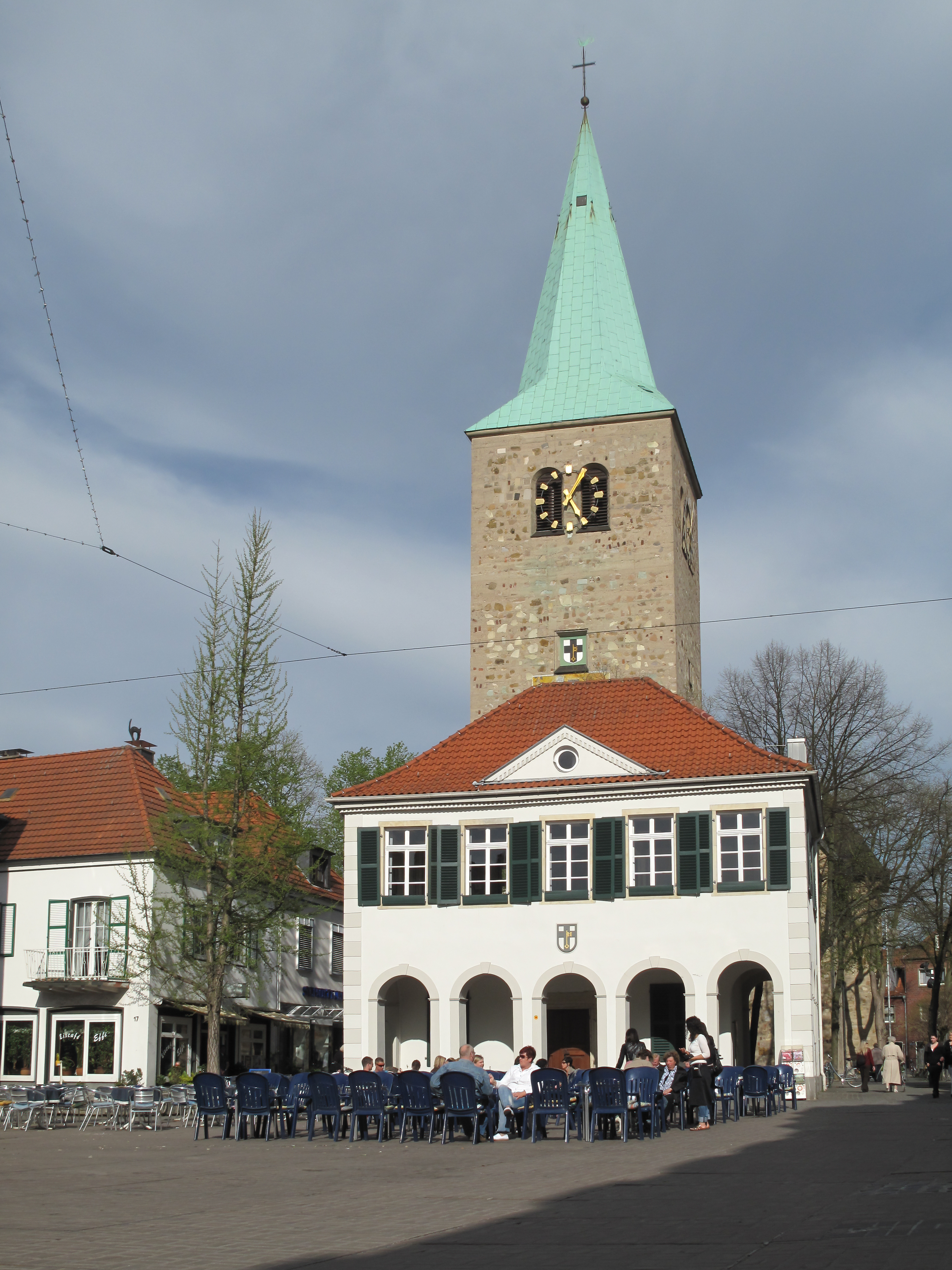
Dorsten, church: Sankt Agatha Kirche and das Alte Rathaus

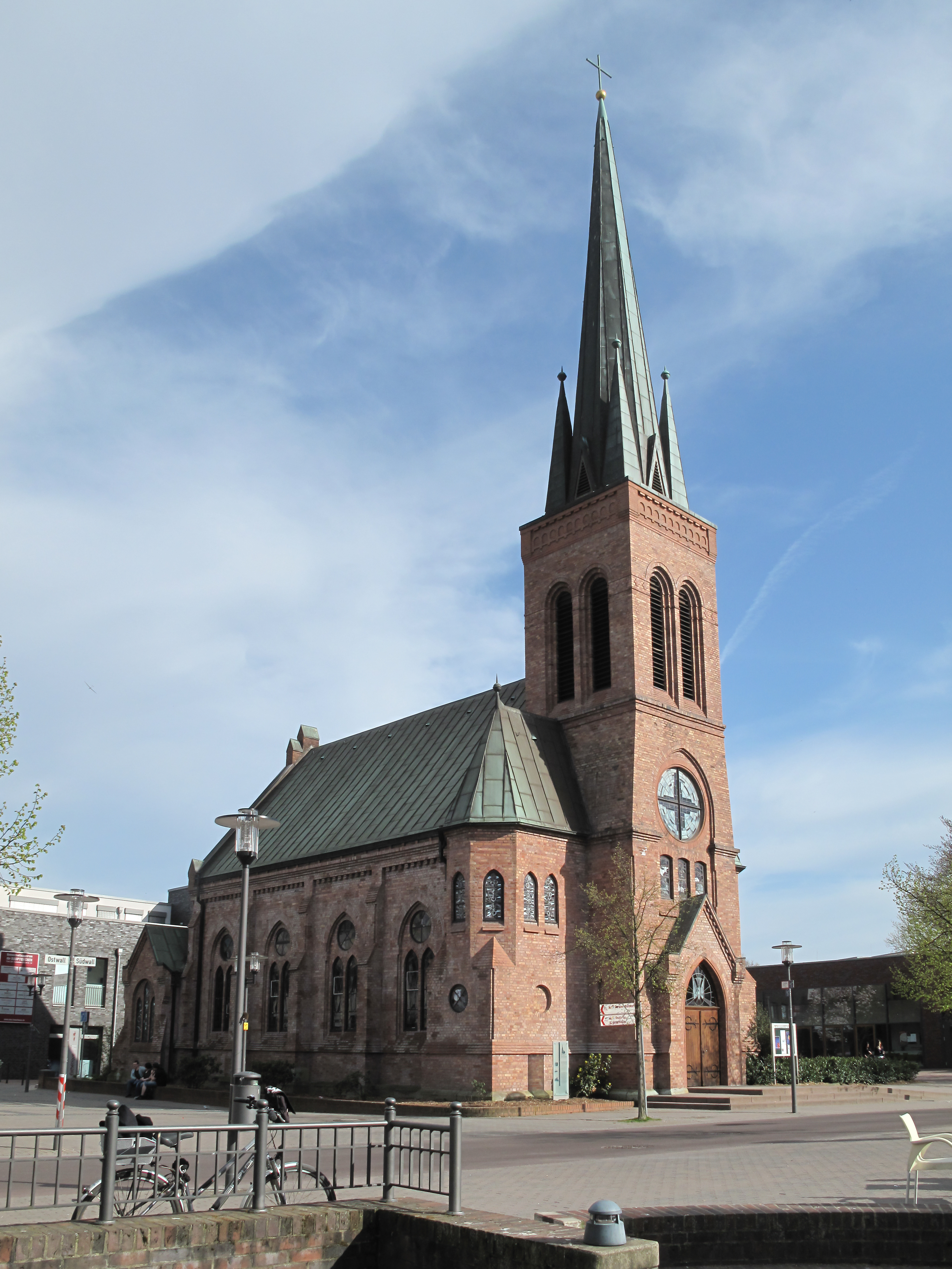
Dorsten, church

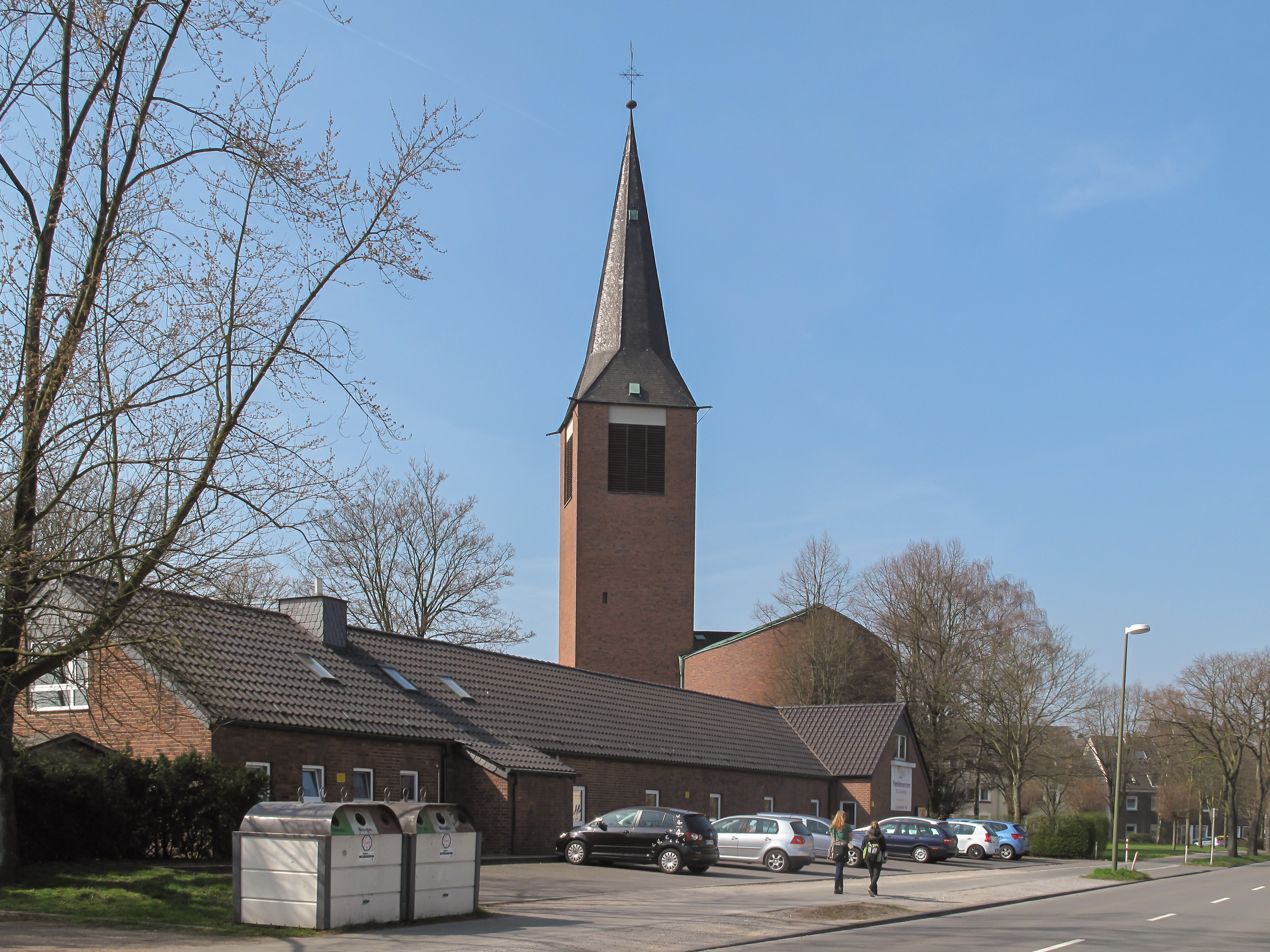
Dorsten, other church in the street

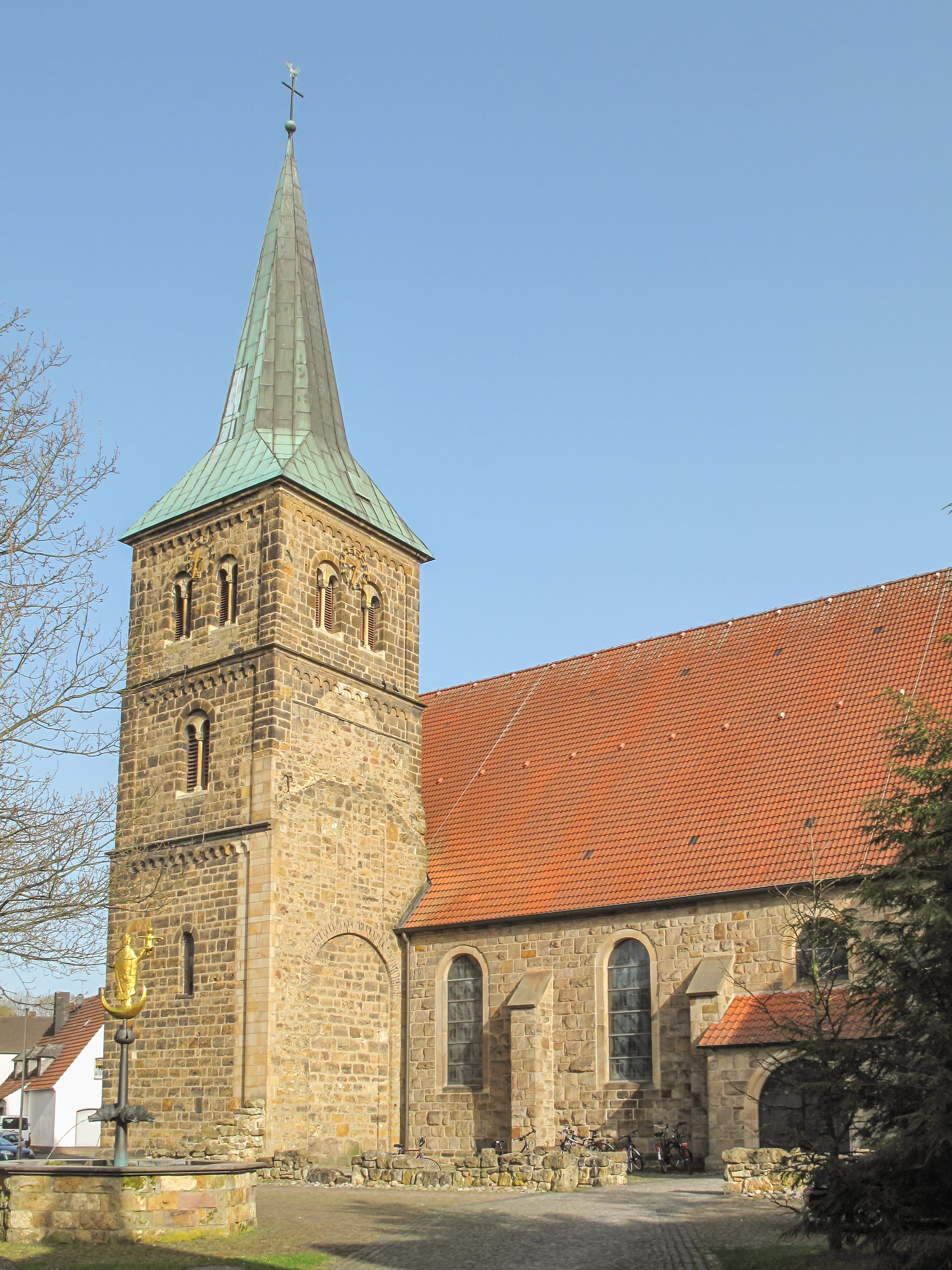
Wulfen, church: Pfarrkirche Sankt Matthäus und Marienbrunnen

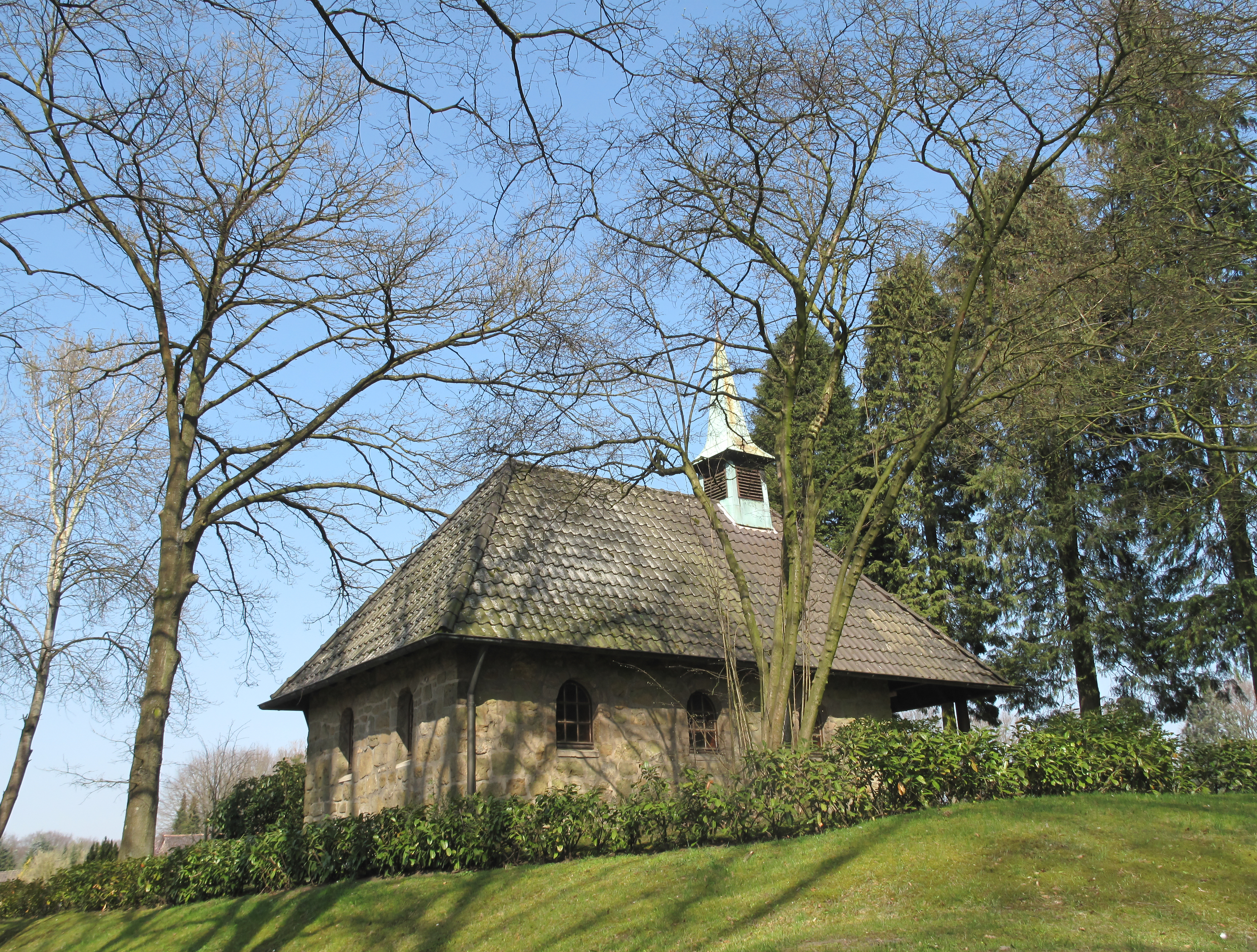
Wulfen, chapel

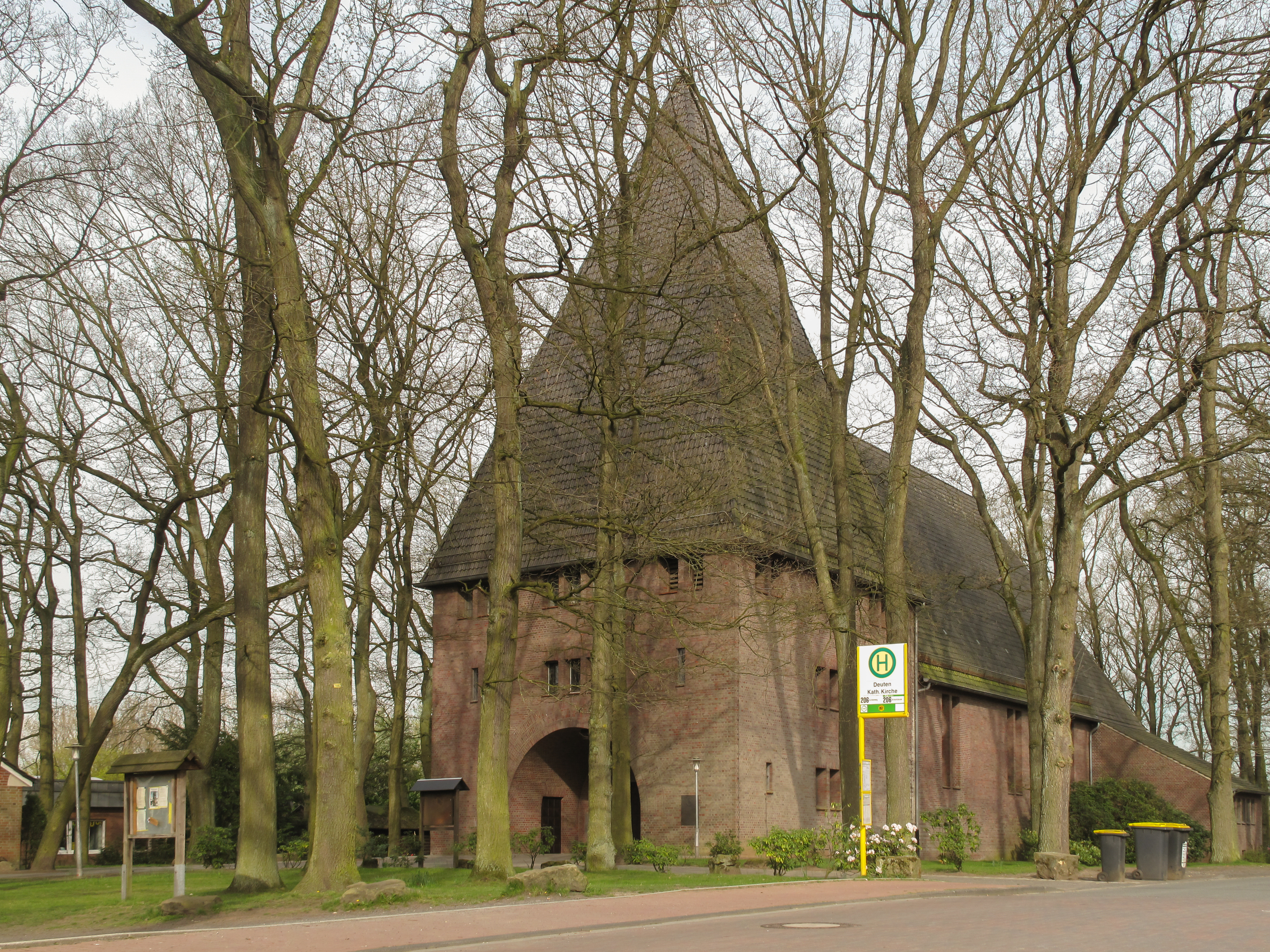
Deuten, chapel: Herz Jesu Kirche

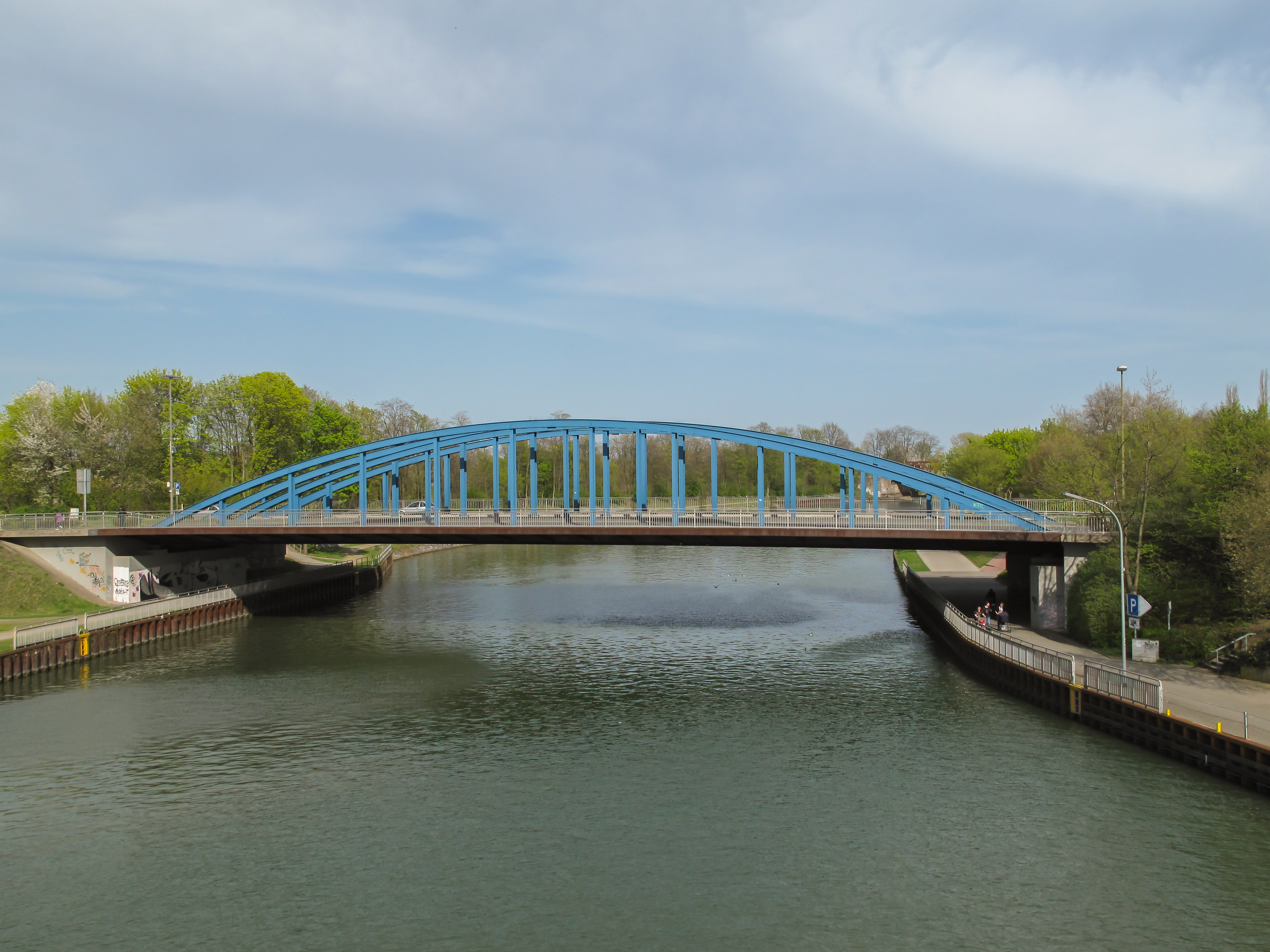
Dorsten, bridge across Wesel-Datteln Kanal

== Main sights ==
- Lembeck castle
- Historical Town Hall
- Jewish Museum of Westphalia
- Historical Tüshaus Mill

== Transport ==
Dorsten has its own airfield. The airfield has a grass strip with a runway of 800 metres (2,600 feet) and one government-sponsored hangar being used by the local gliding club.

Dorsten station is on the Duisburg–Quakenbrück and the Gelsenkirchen-Bismarck–Winterswijk railways and is served by regional services to Gladbeck, Bottrop, Essen, Dortmund, Borken (Westf) and Coesfeld (Westf).

== Ammunition depot ==
German Bundeswehr maintains an ammunition depot close to the suburb of Wulfen. The depot also provides storage space for the British Army Germany.

== Notable people ==
- Dirk Balster (born 1966), rowing world champion 1989–1991
- Franz Bronstert (1895–1967), engineer and painter
- Dorothee Feller (born 1966), politician
- Cornelia Funke (born 1958), children's and young people's book author
- Agnes Hürland-Büning (1926–2009), controversial politician (CDU)
- Julia Lohmann (born 1951), painter and sculptor
- Winfried Nachtwei (born 1946), politician (The Greens) and Member of Bundestag 1994–2009
- Manfred Nielson (born 1955), admiral
- Günter Pröpper (born 1941), footballer
- Thorsten Streppelhoff (born 1969), rowing world champion in 1991 and 1993
- Winfried Toll (born 1955), conductor, singer and composer of classical music
- Kevin Vennemann (born 1977), writer

== Twin towns – sister cities ==
Dorsten is twinned with:

- Crawley, England, United Kingdom
- Dormans, France
- Ernée, France
- Hainichen in Germany
- Hod HaSharon, Israel
- Newtownabbey, Northern Ireland, United Kingdom
- Rybnik, Poland
- Waslala, Nicaragua
