= You Should Have Left (novella) =

2016 novella by German writer Daniel Kehlmann

- First edition (German)
- Author: Daniel Kehlmann
- Translator: Ross Benjamin
- Language: German
- Publisher: Rowohlt Verlag; Riverrun, UK
- Publication date: 2016
- Publication place: Germany
- Pages: 113
- ISBN: 978-1101871928

You Should Have Left (Original title: Du hättest gehen sollen) is a 2016 novella by German writer Daniel Kehlmann. Originally written in German, it was later translated by Ross Benjamin into English. The novella is the diary of a screenwriter attempting to write a sequel, Besties 2, to follow his earlier success, Besties. He is on a deadline for the production studio and includes events from his daily life in his screenplay.

== Plot ==
December 2: An unnamed narrator rents a house through Airbnb to stay in on vacation with his wife, Susanna, and daughter, Esther. He also spends that time writing the sequel for his screenplay, which Susanna disapproves of. This starts fights between them.

December 3: The narrator experiences abnormalities in the house. He gets lost while looking for the bedroom. He blames it on him still getting used to the house's layout and starts creating the plot for his screenplay.

December 4: The narrator recalls a nightmare. It involves a woman with narrow eyes close to the root of her nose and yellow teeth. He was trapped by fear of her and could not move until she stepped away from him, allowing him to wake up. He later realizes the woman was from a photo in the laundry room. Needing groceries, he drives to the local town, nearly having an accident at every turn. In the store, the clerk does not speak much and struggles to retrieve every item on the shopping list. Before the narrator leaves, the clerk gives him a plastic triangle ruler and tells him to try the right angle. The narrator returns to the house and transcribes this interaction into his screenplay. He notices halfway through that he has no reflection and even sees items directly behind him. The phenomenon is dismissed as his imagination. The narrator checks for the photo in the laundry room but does not find one, nor does he find evidence that a nail had been in the wall.

December 5: It becomes increasingly difficult for the narrator to tell whether he is dreaming or awake. He discovers his wife has been cheating on him with someone named David. When he confronts her about it, Susanna tells him to think of Esther. The narrator then uses the ruler, discovering when he would draw a right angle it makes a 40x42 angle. Creating a rectangle made a diamond with a 49x51 angle equaling 100 degrees. Susanna returns, and the two fight until she leaves with the car. He goes back through his notebook to recollect how much Susanna and David had been talking to each other without him knowing. He instead sees Get Away written there in his handwriting twice. He suspects his wife wrote it but is unsure how she perfectly fit her words between the words he actually wrote. The narrator hears a high-pitched voice through the baby monitor and checks on his daughter. Seeing that there is nothing abnormal about her or the room, he returns to the kitchen where the monitor shows him hovering over his daughter. Esther sits up and screams at the Narrator's figure. He hears a voice in the monitor say, “You should have left. Now it’s too late.” He moves his daughter to the living room couch to protect her. Even with his daughter beside him, the monitor still shows her sleeping in the room with someone singing to her. He rechecks the triangle ruler and creates a figure 39x41 degrees.

December 6: The next morning, the narrator wishes to escape by paying for whatever taxi he could buy to leave. He calls the convenience store and asks the clerk what happened at the house. Apparently, a vacationer disappeared and was never found again. The clerk says the building that had been there before the house was a tower built by the devil, and a wizard destroyed it with God's help. Or that a wizard built the tower, and God destroyed it. The narrator then loses phone service. He tries to leave the locked living room only to have the door lead back to the living room. He writes in his notebook with the hope someone will find it. He then tries walking backward out of the house, thinking it might help him.

December 7: The narrator tries his idea of walking backward with Esther and manages to escape. Esther notices a figure standing in a window of the house, and the narrator pretends it is not there. He walks down the road using his phone's flashlight as the only source of light. Esther complains about the cold and clings to him for safety. At the end of the road, they see a light; it belongs to the house. The narrator walks back into the house, telling Esther to fall asleep. Susanna returns and apologizes for the affair, saying it was a mistake. The narrator tells her to take Esther and get away while they can. He returns to the house alone.

== Critical reception ==
The novella has been well received by critics because of the author's ability to blur the lines between reality and imagination. Ulf Zimmerman complimented Kehlmann for demonstrating how to get his readers "to believe pretty much anything" and referenced the novel to have inspiration from Stephen King's The Shining. The Brooklyn Rail called the novel "a masterful experiment about the limits of literary realism" and credited Kehlmann's use of unreliable first-person narration.

=== Award nominations ===
- International Dublin Literary Awards 2019

== Film adaptation ==
The book was adapted into a film, with American actor Kevin Bacon starring and David Koepp directing and writing, for production company Blumhouse Productions. Originally scheduled for a theatrical release, the film was released through video on demand on June 18, 2020, by Universal Pictures.
