= Measuring the World =

2005 novel by Daniel Kehlmann

- First edition (German)
- Author: Daniel Kehlmann
- Original title: Die Vermessung der Welt
- Translator: Carol Brown Janeway
- Language: German
- Genre: Novel
- Publisher: Rowohlt Verlag; Pantheon Books
- Publication date: September 2005
- Publication place: Germany
- English publication date: November 7, 2006
- Pages: 304 (German hardcover edition); 272 (English hardcover edition)
- ISBN: 3-498-03528-2 (German hardcover edition); ISBN 0-375-42446-6 (English hardcover edition)
- OCLC: 61714982
- LC Class: PT2671.E32 V47 2005

Measuring the World (German: Die Vermessung der Welt) is a novel by German-Austrian author Daniel Kehlmann, published in 2005 by Rowohlt Verlag, Reinbek. The novel re-imagines the lives of German mathematician Carl Friedrich Gauss and German geographer Alexander von Humboldt—who was accompanied on his journeys by French explorer Aimé Bonpland—and their many groundbreaking ways of taking the world's measure, as well as Humboldt's and Bonpland's travels in America and Humboldt's meeting with Gauss in 1828. One subplot fictionalises the conflict between Gauss and his son Eugene; while Eugene wanted to become a linguist, his father decreed that he study law. The book was a bestseller; by 2012, it had sold more than 2.3 million copies in Germany alone.

A film version directed by Detlev Buck was released in 2012.

== Translations ==
The English translation is by Carol Brown Janeway (November 2006).

Rosa Pilar Blanco translated the book into Spanish.
