= Daniel Kehlmann =

German-language novelist (born 1975)

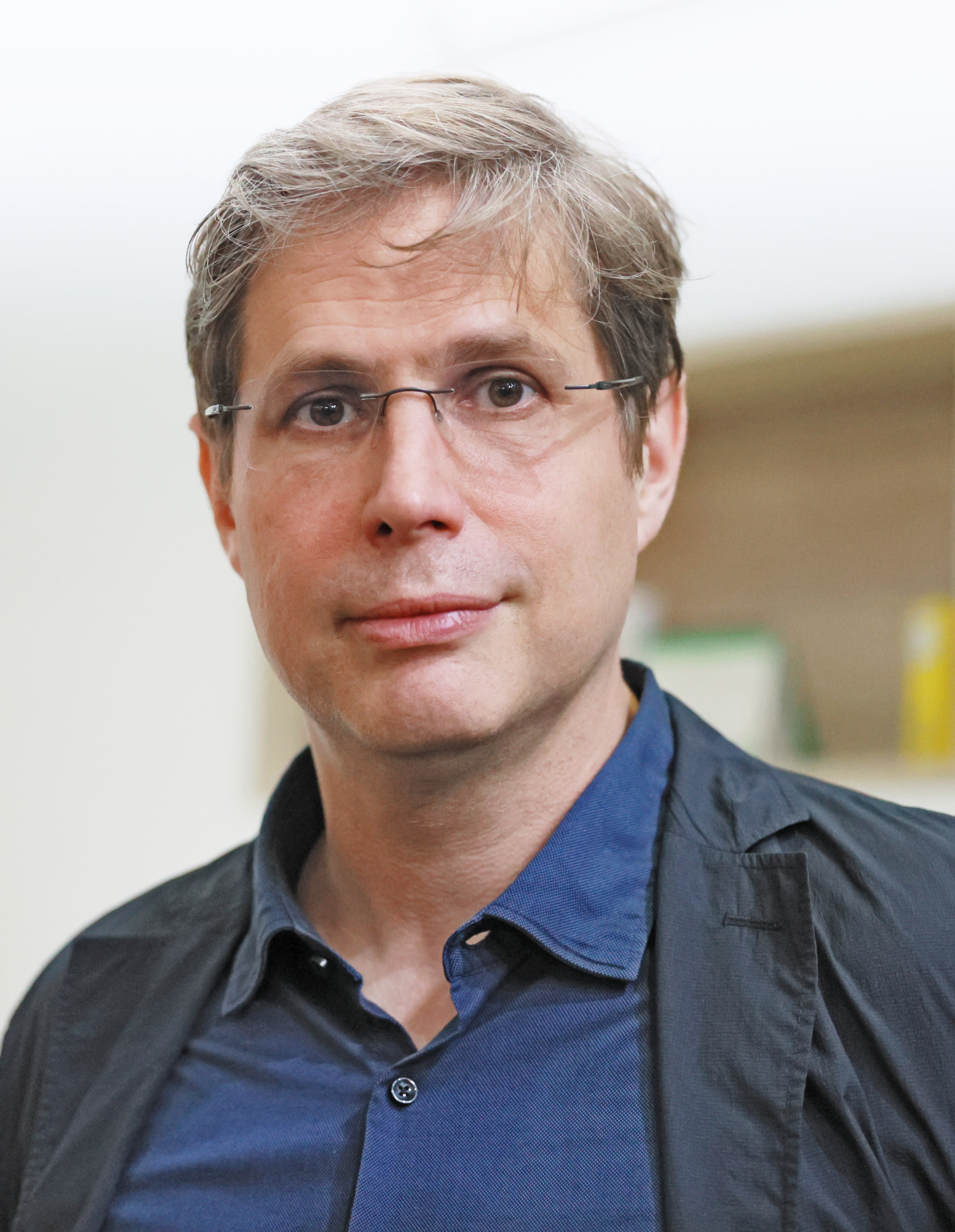
- Kehlmann in 2023
- Born: 13 January 1975 (age 51); Munich, West Germany
- Occupation: Writer
- Writing career
- Notable works: Measuring the World (2005); You Should Have Left (2016); Tyll (2017)

Daniel Kehlmann (German: [ˈdaːni̯eːl ˈkeːlman, -ni̯ɛl -]; born 13 January 1975) is a German-language novelist and playwright of both Austrian and German nationality.

His novel Die Vermessung der Welt (translated into English by Carol Brown Janeway as Measuring the World, 2006) is the best-selling book in the German language since Patrick Süskind's Perfume was released in 1985. In an ironic way, it deals with Alexander von Humboldt, one of the world's best-known naturalists of the 18th and 19th centuries, and Humboldt's relationship with the mathematician Carl Friedrich Gauss. According to The New York Times, it was the world's second-best selling novel in 2006.

All Kehlmann's subsequent novels reached the number-one spot on Germany's Spiegel bestseller list and were translated into English. He collaborated with Jonathan Franzen and Paul Reitter on Franzen's 2013 book The Kraus Project.

Kehlmann's play The Mentor, translated by Christopher Hampton, opened at Theatre Royal, Bath, in April 2017 starring F. Murray Abraham and transferred to the London West End in July 2017. In October 2017, his play Christmas Eve, also translated by Christopher Hampton, premiered at the Theatre Royal. His novella You Should Have Left (2016) was adapted into a movie starring Kevin Bacon and Amanda Seyfried. Kehlmann's highly praised novel Tyll (2017), which sold more than 600,000 copies in German alone and was published in the US in February 2020, is currently being adapted into a TV series for Netflix by the makers of Dark. The novel was shortlisted for the 2020 International Booker Prize. Kehlmann's play Die Reise der Verlorenen was adapted for BBC radio by Tom Stoppard under the title The Voyage of the St. Louis.

In 2026, The Director, Ross Benjamin's English translation of Kehlmann's 2023 novel Lichtspiel, was shortlisted for the International Booker Prize.

== Life and career ==
Kehlmann was born in Munich, West Germany, the son of the television director Michael Kehlmann and the actress Dagmar Mettler. His family moved to his father's hometown Vienna when Daniel was six years old. His paternal grandparents were born Jewish, and his father was in a concentration camp during WWII. Kehlmann lives in Berlin.

Since 2015, Kehlmann has held the Eberhard Berent Chair at New York University. He is a member of the Deutsche Akademie für Sprache und Dichtung.

From 2016 to 2017, he was a fellow at the New York Public Library's Cullman Center for Writers and Scholars.

The novel Tyll was shortlisted for the International Booker Prize.

Kehlmann also works as a screenwriter and wrote the script for the television film Das letzte Problem. He adapted Thomas Mann's novel Confessions of Felix Krull Confidence Man for an upcoming movie.

Kehlmann is married and has a son.

== Awards and honors ==
- 2006: Kleist Prize
- 2007: Welt-Literaturpreis
- 2007: Grand Prix du livre des dirigeants
- 2008: Thomas Mann Prize
- 2008: P.O. Enquists pris
- 2010: Prix Cévennes du roman européen
- 2012: Nestroy Theatre Prize, Best play – Authors prize for Geister in Princeton
- 2018: Friedrich-Hölderlin-Preis
- 2018: Frank-Schirrmacher-Preis
- 2019: Anton Wildgans Prize
- 2019: Schubart-Literaturpreis
- 2021: Elisabeth-Langgässer-Literaturpreis
- 2022: Marbacher Schillerrede
- 2024: Ludwig Börne Prize
- 2025: New York Public Library Library Lion

== Bibliography ==
=== Novels ===
- Beerholms Vorstellung (1997).
- Unter der Sonne (1998).
- Mahlers Zeit (1999).
- Der fernste Ort (2001).
- Ich und Kaminski (2003). Me and Kaminski, translated by Carol Brown Janeway (Pantheon, 2008).
- Die Vermessung der Welt (2005). Measuring the World, translated by Carol Brown Janeway (Pantheon, 2006).
- Requiem für einen Hund (2008).
- Leo Richters Porträt (2009).
- Ruhm. Ein Roman in neun Geschichten (2009). Fame. A Novel in Nine Stories, translated by Carol Brown Janeway (Pantheon, 2010).
- Lob: Über Literatur (2010).
- F. (2013). F. A Novel. Translated by Carol Brown Janeway (Pantheon, 2014).
- Du hättest gehen sollen (2016). You Should Have Left, translated by Ross Benjamin (Pantheon, 2016).
- Tyll (2017). Tyll, translated by Ross Benjamin (Pantheon, 2020).
- Lichtspiel (2023). The Director, translated by Ross Benjamin (2025)
- Afrika (2026).

=== Plays ===
- Geister in Princeton (2013).
- Der Mentor (2014). The Mentor, translated by Christopher Hampton (Faber and Faber, 2017).
- Heilig Abend (2017). Christmas Eve, translated by Christopher Hampton (Faber and Faber, 2017).
- Die Reise der Verlorenen (2018)

== Filmography ==
- Unter der Sonne (directed by Baran bo Odar, 2006; short story) OCLC 916382915
- Glory: A Tale of Mistaken Identities (Isabel Kleefeld, 2012; novel) OCLC 1184562954
- Measuring the World (Detlev Buck, 2012; novel and screenplay) OCLC 840926671
- Me and Kaminski (Wolfgang Becker, 2015; novel) OCLC 1028611447
- Das letzte Problem (Karl Markovics, 2019; screenplay) OCLC 1139691886
- You Should Have Left (David Koepp, 2020; novel) OCLC 1288125241
- Verhör in der Nacht (Matti Geschonneck, 2020; screenplay, based on Kehlmann's stageplay Christmas Eve) OCLC 1226659233
- Confessions of Felix Krull (Detlev Buck, 2021; screenplay) OCLC 10397655225
- Nebenan (Daniel Brühl, 2021; screenplay) OCLC 1553107199
