= Me and Kaminski =

2003 novel by Daniel Kehlmann

- First edition (German)
- Author: Daniel Kehlmann
- Original title: Ich und Kaminski
- Translator: Carol Brown Janeway
- Language: German
- Publisher: Suhrkamp Verlag
- Publication date: 2003
- Publication place: Austria; Germany
- English publication date: 2008
- Pages: 173
- ISBN: 978-0-307-37744-9

Me and Kaminski (German: Ich und Kaminski) is a 2003 novel by the Austrian-German writer Daniel Kehlmann. It tells the story of a "klutzy journalist" who goes on a journey with an elderly painter he is writing a biography about.

== Reception ==
Jake Kerridge wrote in The Daily Telegraph: "It is over a century since George Gissing described the whole business of biography as 'a farce'. That is the view Kehlmann takes, not only in the sense that the biography industry is trivial and contemptible, but also that it is so absurd as to be a source of entertainment. Hence this sparkling and consistently amusing comedy, by turns broad and sophisticated."

== Adaptions ==
The novel was adapted to stage by Anna Maria Krassnigg as Ich und Kaminski premiering on June 25, 2008. A film adaptation directed by Wolfgang Becker and starring Daniel Brühl as the biographer and Jesper Christensen as Kaminski, premiered on September 17, 2015, in Germany.

== See also ==
- 2003 in literature
- German literature
