= Gymnasium Petrinum Dorsten =

Coordinates: 51°39′54″N 6°57′48″E

Location
- Im Werth 17; Dorsten, North Rhine-Westphalia, 46282; Germany

Information
- School type: State School
- Founded: 1642; 384 years ago
- Headmaster: Vera Merge
- Grades: 5–13 (Abitur)
- Enrollment: approx. 1400
- Language: German
- Website: http://www.petrinum-dorsten.de

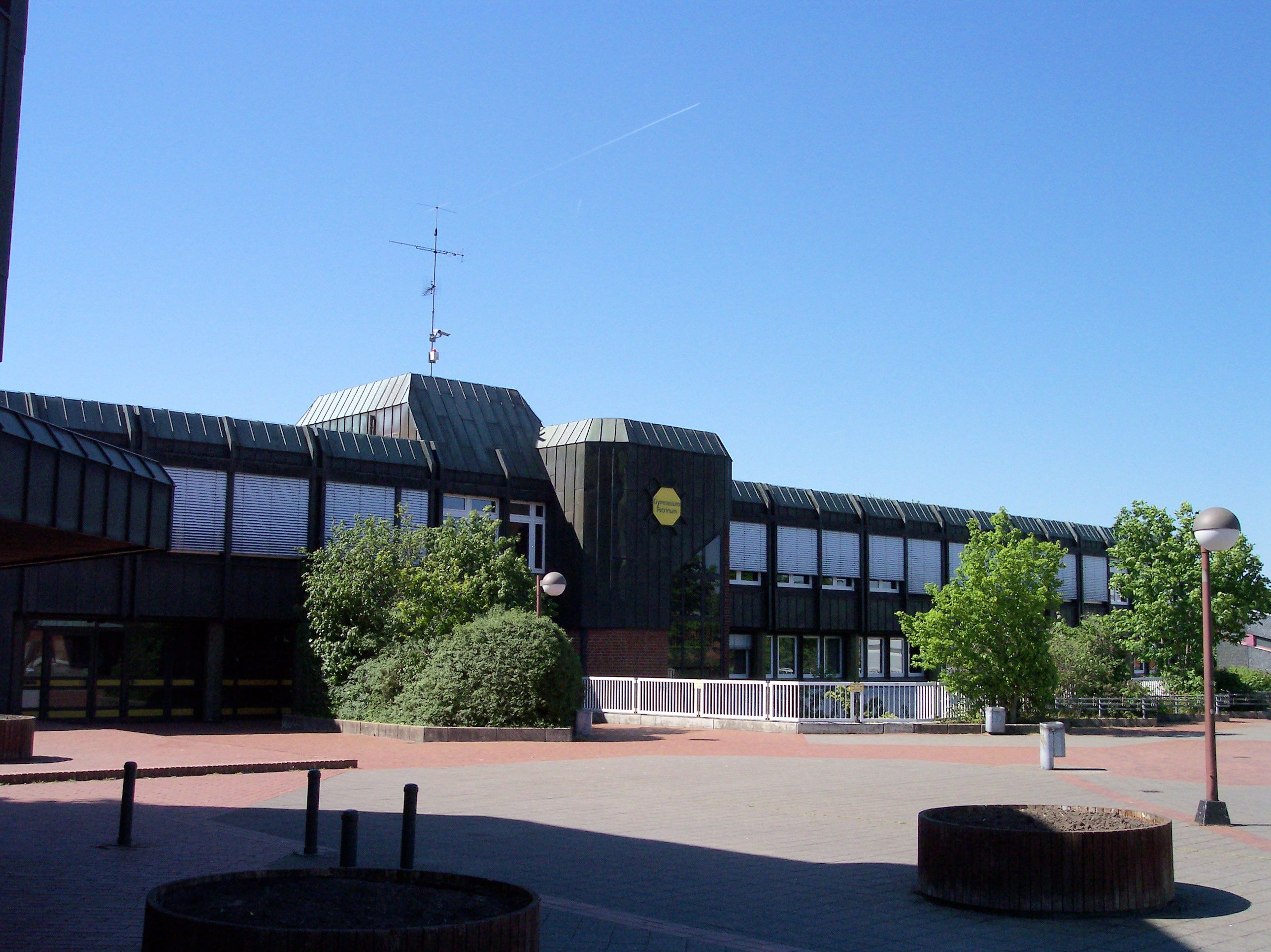
Gymnasium Petrinum Dorsten

Gymnasium Petrinum is a state-funded secondary school and the oldest Gymnasium in the German town of Dorsten, North Rhine-Westphalia.

== History ==
The Westphalian town of Dorsten is host to Germany's oldest continuous cloister of the Franciscan Order, founded in 1488. Out of this cloister, Petrinum was established as a Latin school in 1642. Although the Thirty Years' War (1618–48) had badly derogated Dorsten's medieval wealth and status as a member of the Hanseatic League of international trading cities, the town council mobilised support for the clerics' efforts.

In 1823 the Latin school became a Progymnasium, meaning that a more encompassing list of subjects was taught. The last Franciscan headmaster died in 1837 and in 1898 the school was made a full Gymnasium. Petrinum subsequently moved to a new building in 1902 and in 1904 the first Abitur exam was conducted at the school now officially named "Catholic Gymnasium (with compensatory education in Greek) at Dorsten". During the Occupation of the Ruhr in 1923 the school building served as headquarters for Belgian troops, which meant that teaching had to take place in another building.

After heavy disruptions during the Second World War, instruction returned to normal in 1948 although the school building still had to be shared with a Volksschule. Due to the continuing shortage of teaching rooms, the building was extended, completely overhauled and re-opened in 1963. In 1978 the first girls took the Abitur exam at the former boys' school and in 1982 Petrinum moved to a completely new building by the Wesel-Datteln Canal. The building was further extended by a new tract in 2003.
