= Kevin Vennemann =

German author (born 1977)

Kevin Vennemann (born 1977) is a German author.

Vennemann was born in Dorsten, North Rhine-Westphalia, in 1977. He began writing short fiction while studying comparative literature at Cologne University. However, he made no effort to publish his stories until he had enough for a collection, which he then took to the small Cologne publisher Tropen Verlag, which immediately published the collection as Wolfskinderringe. It got little attention, and Vennemann went on to study history and American and Scandinavian Studies at colleges and universities in Vienna, Innsbruck, and Berlin before completing his first novel, Close to Jedenew. Unusual in being a consideration of the Holocaust at a time when young German writers had generally ceased such discussion, it was an immediate sensation and drew critical praise, leading to its subsequent publication across the continent by some of Europe's leading publishing houses. Vennemann currently lives in Los Angeles, California, where he teaches German at Scripps College.

== Works ==
- Wolfskinderringe (Tropen, 2002)
- Close to Jedenew (Suhrkamp 2005) / English translation by Ross Benjamin (Melville House Publishing, 2009)
- Mara Kogoj (Suhrkamp, 2007)
- Sunset Boulevard. Vom Filmen, Bauen und Sterben in Los Angeles (Suhrkamp, 2012)
