= Thomas Pletzinger =

German writer and translator (born 1975)

Thomas Pletzinger (born 1975 in Münster) is a German writer and translator. He is best known for his debut novel Bestattung eines Hundes, which was published in 2008 to wide acclaim. It has been translated into English as Funeral for a Dog. Pletzinger served as the writer-in-residence in the German department at Grinnell College in 2010 and again in 2014.

== Works ==
- Pletzinger, Thomas (2008). Bestattung eines Hundes : Roman (in German). Köln: Kiepenheuer & Witsch. ISBN 978-3-462-03968-9. OCLC 213960776.
- —— (2012). Gentlemen, wir leben am Abgrund (in German). Köln. ISBN 978-3-462-04369-3. OCLC 725270230.
- —— (2019). The great Nowitzki das außergewöhnliche Leben des großen deutschen Sportlers (in German). Köln: Verlag Kiepenheuer & Witsch. ISBN 978-3-462-04732-5. OCLC 1062344079.
- —— (2021). The Great Nowitzki : das außergewöhnliche Leben des großen deutschen Sportlers (in German). München: btb Verlag. ISBN 978-3-442-77028-1. OCLC 1245337801.

=== English translations ===
- Pletzinger, Thomas; Benjamin, Ross (2011). Funeral for a dog : a novel. New York: W.W. Norton. ISBN 978-0-393-33725-9. OCLC 601107847.
