= Independent Foreign Fiction Prize =

British literary award (1990–2015)

- Description: British literary award honoring contemporary fiction in translation published in the United Kingdom
- Country: United Kingdom
- Presented by: The Independent / BookTrust (from 2011)

The Independent Foreign Fiction Prize (1990–2015) was a British literary award. It was inaugurated by British newspaper The Independent to honour contemporary fiction in translation in the United Kingdom. The award was first launched in 1990 and ran for five years before falling into abeyance. It was revived in 2001 with the financial support of Arts Council England. Beginning in 2011 the administration of the prize was taken over by BookTrust, but retaining the "Independent" in the name. In 2015, the award was disbanded in a "reconfiguration" in which it was merged with the Man Booker International Prize.

Entries (fiction or short stories) were published in English translation in the UK in the year preceding the award by a living author. The prize acknowledged both the winning novelist and translator, each being awarded £5,000 and a magnum of champagne from drinks sponsor Champagne Taittinger.

== Winners, shortlists and longlists ==
=== 1990 ===
Award	Author	Country	Language	Translator	Title Original title
Winner	Orhan Pamuk	Turkey	Turkish	Victoria Holbrook	The White Castle; Beyaz Kale

=== 1991 ===
Award	Author	Country	Language	Translator	Title Original title
Winner	Milan Kundera	Czechia; France	Czech	Peter Kussi	Immortality; Nesmrtelnost

=== 1992 ===
Award	Author	Country	Language	Translator	Title Original title	Notes
Winner	Simon Leys	Belgium	French	Patricia Clancy	The Death of Napoleon; La Mort de Napoléon	
Shortlist	Slavenka Drakulić	Croatia	Croatian	Ellen Elias-Bursać	Holograms of Fear; Hologrami straha	
Shortlist	Paweł Huelle	Poland	Polish	Antonia Lloyd-Jones	Who Was David Weiser? Weiser Dawidek	
Shortlist	Yaşar Kemal	Turkey	Turkish	Thilda Kemal	To Crush the Serpent; Yılanı Öldürseler	
Shortlist	Ivan Klíma	Czechia	Czech	A. G. Brain	Judge on Trial; Soudce z milosti	
Shortlist	Dacia Maraini	Italy	Italian	Dick Kitto; Elspeth Spottiswood	The Silent Duchess; La lunga vita di Marianna Ucrìa	
Shortlist	Carlo Mazzantini	Italy	Italian	Simonetta Wenkert	In Search of a Glorious Death; A cercar la bella morte	
Shortlist	Érik Orsenna	France	French	Jeremy Leggatt	Love and Empire; L'Exposition coloniale	
Shortlist	Giorgio Pressburger	Italy	Italian	Piers Spence	The Law of White Spaces; La legge degli spazi bianchi	
Shortlist	Jean Rouaud	France	French	Ralph Manheim	Fields of Glory; Les Champs d'honneur	
Shortlist	Leonardo Sciascia	Italy	Italian	Joseph Farrell; Marie Evans	The Knight and Death; Il cavaliere e la morte	
Shortlist	Antonio Tabucchi	Italy	Italian	Tim Parks	Vanishing Point; Il filo dell'orizzonte	

=== 1993 ===
Award	Author	Country	Language	Translator	Title Original title	Notes
Winner	José Saramago	Portugal	Portuguese	Giovanni Pontiero	The Year of the Death of Ricardo Reis; O Ano da Morte de Ricardo Reis	
Shortlist	Juan Goytisolo	Spain	Spanish	Helen Lane	Makbara	
Shortlist	Günter Grass	Germany	German	Ralph Manheim	The Call of the Toad; Unkenrufe	
Shortlist	Ismail Kadare	Albania	Albanian	Barbara Bray (translation from French)	The Palace of Dreams; Pallati i ëndrrave	
Shortlist	Ivan Klíma	Czechia	Czech	Paul Wilson	My Golden Trades; Moje zlatá řemesla	
Shortlist	A. B. Yehoshua	Israel	Hebrew	Hillel Halkin	Mr. Mani מר מאני	

=== 1994 ===
Award	Author	Country	Language	Translator	Title Original title	Notes
Winner	Bảo Ninh	Vietnam	Vietnamese	Frank Palmos; Phan Thanh Hảo	The Sorrow of War; Nỗi buồn chiến tranh	
Shortlist	Shūsaku Endō	Japan	Japanese	Van C. Gessel	Deep River 深い河	
Shortlist	Margriet de Moor	Netherlands	Dutch	Paul Vincent	First Grey, Then White, Then Blue; Eerst grijs dan wit dan blauw	
Shortlist	Isabel Allende	Chile	Spanish	Margaret Sayers Peden	The Infinite Plan; El plan infinito	
Shortlist	Amos Oz	Israel	Hebrew	Nicholas de Lange	Fima המצב השלישי	
Shortlist	Italo Calvino	Italy	Italian	Tim Parks	The Road to San Giovanni; La strada di San Giovanni	

=== 1995 ===
Award	Author	Country	Language	Translator	Title Original title
Winner	Gert Hofmann	Germany	German	Michael Hofmann	The Film Explainer; Der Kinoerzähler

=== 1996 to 2000 ===
Prize in abeyance.

=== 2001 ===
Award	Author	Country	Language	Translator	Title Original title	Notes
Winner	Marta Morazzoni	Italy	Italian	Emma Rose	The Alphonse Courrier Affair; Il caso Courrier	
Shortlist	Marc Dugain	France	French	Howard Curtis	The Officers' Ward; La chambre des officiers	
Shortlist	Michel Houellebecq	France	French	Frank Wynne	Atomised; Les particules élémentaires	
Shortlist	Antonio Tabucchi	Italy	Italian	Margaret Sayers Peden	The Missing Head of Damasceno Monteiro; La testa perduta di Damasceno Monteiro	
Shortlist	May Telmissany	Egypt; Canada	Arabic	Roger Allen	Dunyazad دنيا زاد	
Shortlist	Hans-Ulrich Treichel	Germany	German	Carol Brown Janeaway	Lost; Der Verlorene	

=== 2002 ===
Award	Author	Country	Language	Translator	Title Original title	Notes
Winner	W. G. Sebald	Germany	German	Anthea Bell	Austerlitz	
Shortlist	Agnès Desarthe	France	French	Adriana Hunter	Five Photos of My Wife; Cinq photos de ma femme	
Shortlist	Dai Sijie	France	French	Ina Rilke	Balzac and the Little Chinese Seamstress; Balzac et la Petite Tailleuse chinoise	
Shortlist	Andrey Kurkov	Ukraine	Russian	George Bird	Death and the Penguin; Смерть постороннего	
Shortlist	Hanan al-Shaykh	Lebanon	Arabic	Catherine Cobham	Only in London انها لندن يا عزيزي	
Shortlist	H.M. van den Brink	Netherlands	Dutch	Paul Vincent	On the Water; Over het water	

=== 2003 ===
Award	Author	Country	Language	Translator	Title Original title	Notes
Winner	Per Olov Enquist	Sweden	Swedish	Tiina Nunnally	The Visit of the Royal Physician; Livläkarens besök	
Shortlist	Frédéric Beigbeder	France	French	Adriana Hunter	99 Francs	
Shortlist	Peter Stephan Jungk	Austria	German	Michael Hofmann	The Snowflake Constant; Tigor	
Shortlist	Mario Vargas Llosa	Peru	Spanish	Edith Grossman	The Feast of the Goat; La fiesta del Chivo	
Shortlist	José Saramago	Portugal	Portuguese	Margaret Jull Costa	The Cave; A Caverna	
Shortlist	José Carlos Somoza	Spain	Spanish	Sonia Soto	The Athenian Murders; La caverna de las ideas	
Longlist	Umberto Eco	Italy	Italian	William Weaver	Baudolino	
Longlist	Jens Christian Grøndahl	Denmark	Danish	Anne Born	Lucca	
Longlist	Norbert Gstrein	Austria	German	Anthea Bell	The English Years; Die englischen Jahre	
Longlist	Milton Hatoum	Brazil	Portuguese	John Gledson	The Brothers; Dois Irmãos	
Longlist	Michel Houellebecq	France	French	Frank Wynne	Platform; Plateforme	
Longlist	Milan Kundera	Czechia; France	French	Linda Asher	Ignorance; L'Ignorance	
Longlist	Amin Maalouf	Lebanon; France	French	Barbara Bray	Balthasar's Odyssey; Le Périple de Baldassare	
Longlist	Patrícia Melo	Brazil	Portuguese	Clifford E. Landers	Inferno	
Longlist	Arturo Pérez-Reverte	Spain	Spanish	Margaret Sayers Peden	The Nautical Chart; La carta esférica	
Longlist	Atiq Rahimi	Afghanistan; France	Dari	Erdağ Göknar	Earth and Ashes خاکستر و خاک	

=== 2004 ===
Award	Author	Country	Language	Translator	Title Original title	Notes
Winner	Javier Cercas	Spain	Spanish	Anne McLean	Soldiers of Salamis; Soldados de Salamina	
Shortlist	Juan Marsé	Spain	Spanish	Nick Caistor	Lizard Tails; Rabos de lagartija	
Shortlist	Elke Schmitter	Germany	German	Carol Brown Janeway	Mrs Sartoris; Frau Sartoris	
Shortlist	Ricardo Piglia	Argentina	Spanish	Amanda Hopkinson	Money to Burn; Plata quemada	
Shortlist	Luther Blissett	Italy	Italian	Shaun Whiteside	Q	
Shortlist	Mahi Binebine	Morocco	French	Lulu Norman	Welcome to Paradise; Cannibales	
Longlist	Lars Saabye Christensen	Norway; Denmark	Norwegian	Kenneth Stevens	The Half Brother; Halvbroren	
Longlist	Gil Courtemanche	Canada	French	Patricia Claxton	A Sunday at the Pool in Kigali; Un dimanche à la piscine à Kigali	
Longlist	Turki al-Hamad	Saudi Arabia	Arabic	Robin Bray	Adama العدامة	
Longlist	Javier Marías	Spain	Spanish	Esther Allen	Dark Back of Time; Negra espalda del tiempo	
Longlist	Sten Nadolny	Germany	German	Ralph Freedman	The Discovery of Slowness; Die Entdeckung der Langsamkeit	
Longlist	Per Petterson	Norway	Norwegian	Anne Born	In the Wake; I kjølvannet	
Longlist	Shan Sa	China; France	French	Adriana Hunter	The Girl Who Played Go; La joueuse de go	
Longlist	Fred Vargas	France	French	David Bellos	Have Mercy on Us All; Pars vite et reviens tard	
Longlist	Ye Zhaoyan	China	Mandarin	Michael Berry	Nanjing 1937: A Love Story 一九三七年的爱情	
Longlist	Akira Yoshimura	Japan	Japanese	Mark Ealey	One Man's Justice 遠い日の戦争	

=== 2005 ===
Award	Author	Country	Language	Translator	Title Original title	Notes
Winner	Frédéric Beigbeder	France	French	Frank Wynne	Windows on the World	
Shortlist	Chico Buarque	Brazil	Portuguese	Alison Entrekin	Budapest; Budapeste	
Shortlist	Irina Denezhkina	Russia	Russian	Andrew Bromfield	Give Me (Songs for Lovers); Дай мне!	
Shortlist	Xiaolu Guo	China; United Kingdom	Chinese	Cindy Carter	Village of Stone 我心中的石头镇	
Shortlist	Orhan Pamuk	Turkey	Turkish	Maureen Freely	Snow; Kar	
Shortlist	Elif Şafak	Turkey; United Kingdom	Turkish	Müge Göçek	The Flea Palace; Bit Palas	
Longlist	David Albahari	Serbia	Serbian	Ellen Elias-Bursać	Götz and Meyer; Gec i Majer	
Longlist	Merete Morken Andersen	Norway	Norwegian	Barbara J. Haveland	Oceans of Time; Hav av tid	
Longlist	Mia Couto	Mozambique	Portuguese	David Brookshaw	The Last Flight of the Flamingo; O Último Voo do Flamingo	
Longlist	Edgardo Cozarinsky	Argentina	Spanish	Nick Caistor	The Bride from Odessa; La novia de Odessa	
Longlist	Viktor Yerofeyev	Russia	Russian	Andrew Reynolds	Life with an Idiot; Жизнь с идиотом	
Longlist	Turki al-Hamad	Saudi Arabia	Arabic	Paul Starkey	Shumaisi الشميسي	
Longlist	Torgny Lindgren	Sweden	Swedish	Tom Geddes	Hash; Pölsan	
Longlist	Enrico Remmert	Italy	Italian	Aubrey Botsford	The Ballad of the Low Lifes; La ballata delle canaglie	
Longlist	José Saramago	Portugal	Portuguese	Margaret Jull Costa	The Double; O Homem Duplicado	
Longlist	Carlos Ruiz Zafón	Spain	Spanish	Lucia Graves	The Shadow of the Wind; La sombra del viento	

=== 2006 ===
Award	Author	Country	Language	Translator	Title Original title	Publisher	Judges	Notes
Winner	Per Petterson	Norway	Norwegian	Anne Born	Out Stealing Horses; Ut og stjæle hester	Harvill Secker	Boyd Tonkin; Paul Bailey; Margaret Busby; Maureen Freely; Kate Griffin	
Shortlist	Paweł Huelle	Poland	Polish	Antonia Lloyd-Jones	Mercedes-Benz: From Letters to Hrabal; Mercedes-Benz: Z listów do Hrabala	Serpent's Tail	Boyd Tonkin; Paul Bailey; Margaret Busby; Maureen Freely; Kate Griffin	
Shortlist	Tahar Ben Jelloun	Morocco	French	Linda Coverdale	This Blinding Absence of Light; Cette aveuglante absence de lumière	Penguin Books	Boyd Tonkin; Paul Bailey; Margaret Busby; Maureen Freely; Kate Griffin	
Shortlist	Imre Kertész	Hungary	Hungarian	Tim Wilkinson	Fatelessness; Sorstalanság	Harvill Secker	Boyd Tonkin; Paul Bailey; Margaret Busby; Maureen Freely; Kate Griffin	
Shortlist	Magda Szabó	Hungary	Hungarian	Len Rix	The Door; Az ajtó	Harvill Secker	Boyd Tonkin; Paul Bailey; Margaret Busby; Maureen Freely; Kate Griffin	
Shortlist	Dubravka Ugrešić	Croatia	Croatian	Michael Henry Heim	The Ministry of Pain; Ministarstvo boli	Saqi Books	Boyd Tonkin; Paul Bailey; Margaret Busby; Maureen Freely; Kate Griffin	
Longlist	Tonino Benacquista	France	French	Adriana Hunter	Someone Else; Quelqu'un d'autre	Bitter Lemon Press	Boyd Tonkin; Paul Bailey; Margaret Busby; Maureen Freely; Kate Griffin	
Longlist	Stefan Chwin	Poland	Polish	Philip Boehm	Death in Danzig; Hanemann	Secker & Warburg	Boyd Tonkin; Paul Bailey; Margaret Busby; Maureen Freely; Kate Griffin	
Longlist	Philippe Claudel	France	French	Adriana Hunter	Grey Souls; Les Âmes grises	Weidenfeld & Nicolson	Boyd Tonkin; Paul Bailey; Margaret Busby; Maureen Freely; Kate Griffin	
Longlist	Marie Darrieussecq	France	French	Ian Monk	White	Faber & Faber	Boyd Tonkin; Paul Bailey; Margaret Busby; Maureen Freely; Kate Griffin	
Longlist	Karen Duve	Germany	German	Anthea Bell	This Is Not a Love Song; Dies ist kein Liebeslied	Bloomsbury	Boyd Tonkin; Paul Bailey; Margaret Busby; Maureen Freely; Kate Griffin	
Longlist	David Grossman	Israel	Hebrew	Jessica Cohen	Lovers and Strangers בגוף אני מבינה	Bloomsbury	Boyd Tonkin; Paul Bailey; Margaret Busby; Maureen Freely; Kate Griffin	
Longlist	Judith Hermann	Germany	German	Margot Bettauer Dembo	Nothing but Ghosts; Nichts als Gespenster	Fourth Estate	Boyd Tonkin; Paul Bailey; Margaret Busby; Maureen Freely; Kate Griffin	
Longlist	Ellen Mattson	Sweden	Swedish	Sarah Death	Snow; Snö	Jonathan Cape	Boyd Tonkin; Paul Bailey; Margaret Busby; Maureen Freely; Kate Griffin	
Longlist	Haruki Murakami	Japan	Japanese	Philip Gabriel	Kafka on the Shore 海辺のカフカ	Vintage Books	Boyd Tonkin; Paul Bailey; Margaret Busby; Maureen Freely; Kate Griffin	
Longlist	Dai Sijie	China; France	French	Ina Rilke	Mr. Muo's Travelling Couch; Le complexe de Di	Chatto & Windus	Boyd Tonkin; Paul Bailey; Margaret Busby; Maureen Freely; Kate Griffin	

=== 2007 ===
Award	Author	Country	Language	Translator	Title Original title	Publisher	Notes
Winner	José Eduardo Agualusa	Angola	Portuguese	Daniel Hahn	The Book of Chameleons; O Vendedor de Passados	Arcadia Books	
Shortlist	Per Olov Enquist	Sweden	Swedish	Tiina Nunnally	The Story of Blanche and Marie; Boken om Blanche och Marie	Vintage	
Shortlist	Vangelis Hatziyannidis	Greece	Greek	Anne-Marie Stanton-Ife	Four Walls; Οι τέσσερις τοίχοι	Marion Boyars	
Shortlist	Javier Marías	Spain	Spanish	Margaret Jull Costa	Your Face Tomorrow 2: Dance and Dream; Tu rostro mañana 2: Baile y sueño	New Directions	
Shortlist	Eva Menasse	Austria	German	Anthea Bell	Vienna	Phoenix	
Shortlist	Dag Solstad	Norway	Norwegian	Sverre Lyngstad	Shyness and Dignity; Genanse og verdighet	Graywolf Press	
Longlist	Kader Abdolah	Iran; Netherlands	Dutch	Susan Massotty	My Father's Notebook; Spijkerschrift	Canongate	
Longlist	Niccolò Ammaniti	Italy	Italian	Jonathan Hunt	Steal You Away; Ti prendo e ti porto via	Canongate	
Longlist	Javier Cercas	Spain	Spanish	Anne McLean	The Speed of Light; La velocidad de la luz	Bloomsbury	
Longlist	Edgardo Cozarinsky	Argentina	Spanish	Nick Caistor	The Moldavian Pimp; El rufián moldavo	Harvill Secker	
Longlist	Jenny Erpenbeck	Germany	German	Susan Bernofsky	The Old Child; Geschichte vom alten Kind	Portobello	
Longlist	Faïza Guène	France	French	Sarah Adams	Just Like Tomorrow; Kiffe kiffe demain	Chatto & Windus	
Longlist	Ismail Kadare	Albania	Albanian	David Bellos (translation from French)	The Successor; Pasardhësi	Canongate	
Longlist	Ma Jian	China; United Kingdom	Chinese	Flora Drew	Stick Out Your Tongue 亮出你的舌苔或空空荡荡	Chatto & Windus	
Longlist	Ngũgĩ wa Thiong'o	Kenya	Kikuyu	Ngũgĩ wa Thiong'o	Wizard of the Crow; Mũrogi wa Kagogo	Harvill Secker	
Longlist	Leonardo Padura	Cuba	Spanish	Peter Bush	Havana Black; Paisaje de otoño	Bitter Lemon	
Longlist	Atiq Rahimi	Afghanistan; France	Dari	Sarah Maguire; Yama Yari	A Thousand Rooms of Dream and Fear هزار خانه خواب و اختناق	Chatto & Windus	
Longlist	José Saramago	Portugal	Portuguese	Margaret Jull Costa	Seeing; Ensaio sobre a Lucidez	Harvill Secker	
Longlist	Elif Şafak	Turkey; United Kingdom	Turkish	Brendan Freely	The Gaze; Mahrem	Marion Boyars	
Longlist	Linn Ullmann	Norway	Norwegian	Barbara Haveland	Grace; Nåde	Picador	

=== 2008 ===
Award	Author	Country	Language	Translator	Title Original title	Notes
Winner	Paul Verhaeghen	Belgium	Dutch	Paul Verhaeghen	Omega Minor	
Shortlist	Paweł Huelle	Poland	Polish	Antonia Lloyd Jones	Castorp	
Shortlist	Daniel Kehlmann	Germany; Austria	German	Carol Brown Janeway	Measuring the World; Die Vermessung der Welt	
Shortlist	Bengt Ohlsson	Sweden	Swedish	Silvester Mazzarella	Gregorius	
Shortlist	Lars Saabye Christensen	Norway; Denmark	Norwegian	Don Barlett	The Model; Modellen	
Shortlist	Marlene van Niekerk	South Africa	Afrikaans	Michiel Heyns	The Way of the Women; Agaat	
Longlist	Alaa Al Aswany	Egypt	Arabic	Humphrey Davies	The Yacoubian Building عمارة يعقوبيان	
Longlist	Jenny Erpenbeck	Germany	German	Susan Bernofsky	The Book of Words; Wörterbuch	
Longlist	Bi Feiyu	China	Chinese	Howard Goldblatt	The Moon Opera 青衣	
Longlist	Ismail Kadare	Albania	Albanian	David Bellos (translation from French)	Agamemnon's Daughter; Vajza e Agamemnonit	
Longlist	Sayed Kashua	Israel	Hebrew	Miraim Shlesinger	Let It Be Morning ויהי בוקר	
Longlist	Erwin Mortier	Belgium	Dutch	Ina Rilke	Shutterspeed; Sluitertijd	
Longlist	Alan Pauls	Argentina	Spanish	Nick Caistor	The Past; El pasado	
Longlist	Peter Pišťanek	Slovakia	Slovak	Peter Petro	Rivers of Babylon	
Longlist	Laura Restrepo	Colombia	Spanish	Natasha Wimmer	Delirium; Delirio	
Longlist	Yasmina Traboulsi	France	French	Polly McLean	Bahia Blues; Les enfants de la Place	
Longlist	Enrique Vila-Matas	Spain	Spanish	Jonathan Dunne	Montano's Malady; El mal de Montano	

=== 2009 ===
Award	Author	Country	Language	Translator	Title Original title	Notes
Winner	Evelio Rosero	Colombia	Spanish	Anne McLean	The Armies; Los ejércitos	
Shortlist	Céline Curiol	France	French	Sam Richard	Voice Over; Voix sans issue	
Shortlist	Ma Jian	China; United Kingdom	Chinese	Flora Drew	Beijing Coma 北京植物人	
Shortlist	Ismail Kadare	Albania	Albanian	David Bellos (translation from French)	The Siege; Kështjella	
Shortlist	Juan Gabriel Vásquez	Colombia	Spanish	Anne McLean	The Informers; Los informantes	
Shortlist	A. B. Yehoshua	Israel	Hebrew	Stuart Schoffman	Friendly Fire אש ידידותית	
Longlist	Sjón	Iceland	Icelandic	Victoria Cribb	The Blue Fox; Skugga-Baldur	
Longlist	José Eduardo Agualusa	Angola	Portuguese	Daniel Hahn	My Father's Wives; As Mulheres de Meu Pai	
Longlist	Dag Solstad	Norway	Norwegian	Sverre Lyngstad	Novel 11, Book 18; Ellevte roman, bok atten	
Longlist	Yōko Ogawa	Japan	Japanese	Stephen Snyder	The Diving Pool 妊娠カレンダー	
Longlist	Eshkol Nevo	Israel	Hebrew	Sondra Silverston	Homesick ארבעה בתים וגעגוע	
Longlist	Linn Ullmann	Norway	Norwegian	Sarah Death	A Blessed Child; Et velsignet barn	
Longlist	Thomas Glavinic	Austria	German	John Brownjohn	Night Work; Die Arbeit der Nacht	
Longlist	György Dragomán	Hungary	Hungarian	Paul Olchvary	The White King; A fehér király	
Longlist	Alexander Ahndoril	Sweden	Swedish	Sarah Death	The Director; Regissören	
Longlist	Saša Stanišić	Bosnia and Herzegovina; Germany	German	Anthea Bell	How the Soldier Repairs the Gramophone; Wie der Soldat das Grammofon repariert	

=== 2010 ===
Award	Author	Country	Language	Translator	Title Original title	Publisher	Notes
Winner	Philippe Claudel	France	French	John Cullen	Brodeck's Report; Le Rapport de Brodeck	MacLehose Press	
Shortlist	Julia Franck	Germany	German	Anthea Bell	The Blind Side of the Heart; Die Mittagsfrau	Harvill Secker	
Shortlist	Pietro Grossi	Italy	Italian	Howard Curtis	Fists; Pugni	Pushkin Press	
Shortlist	Alain Mabanckou	Congo; France	French	Helen Stevenson	Broken Glass; Verre cassé	Serpent's Tail	
Shortlist	Sankar	India	Bengali	Arunava Sinha	Chowringhee চৌরঙ্গী	Atlantic Books	
Shortlist	Rafik Schami	Syria; Germany	German	Anthea Bell	The Dark Side of Love; Die dunkle Seite der Liebe	Arabia Books	
Longlist	Boris Akunin	Russia	Russian	Andrew Bromfield	The Coronation; Коронация, или Последний из романов	Weidenfeld & Nicolson	
Longlist	Ketil Bjørnstad	Norway	Norwegian	Deborah Dawkin; Erik Skuggevik	To Music; Til musikken	Maia Press	
Longlist	Hassan Blasim	Iraq; Finland	Arabic	Jonathan Wright	The Madman of Freedom Square مجنون ساحة الحرية	Comma Press	
Longlist	Elias Khoury	Lebanon	Arabic	Humphrey Davies	Yalo يالو	MacLehose Press	
Longlist	Jonathan Littell	United States; France	French	Charlotte Mandell	The Kindly Ones; Les Bienveillantes	Chatto & Windus	
Longlist	Javier Marías	Spain	Spanish	Margaret Jull Costa	Your Face Tomorrow 3: Poison, Shadow and Farewell; Tu rostro mañana 3: Veneno y sombra y adiós	Chatto & Windus	
Longlist	Yōko Ogawa	Japan	Japanese	Stephen Snyder	The Housekeeper and the Professor 博士の愛した数式	Harvill Secker	
Longlist	Claudia Piñeiro	Argentina	Spanish	Miranda France	Thursday Night Widows; Las viudas de los jueves	Bitter Lemon	
Longlist	Bahaa Taher	Egypt	Arabic	Humphrey Davies	Sunset Oasis واحة الغروب	Sceptre Press	

=== 2011 ===
Award	Author	Country	Language	Translator	Title Original title	Publisher	Notes
Winner	Santiago Roncagliolo	Peru	Spanish	Edith Grossman	Red April; Abril rojo	Atlantic Books	
Shortlist	Marcelo Figueras	Argentina	Spanish	Margaret Jull Costa	Kamchatka	Atlantic Books	
Shortlist	Alberto Barrera Tyszka	Venezuela	Spanish	Howard Curtis	The Sickness; La enfermedad	MacLehose Press	
Shortlist	Jenny Erpenbeck	Germany	German	Susan Bernofsky	Visitation; Heimsuchung	Portobello Books	
Shortlist	Orhan Pamuk	Turkey	Turkish	Maureen Freely	The Museum of Innocence; Masumiyet Müzesi	Faber & Faber	
Shortlist	Per Petterson	Norway	Norwegian	Charlotte Barslund; Per Petterson	I Curse the River of Time; Jeg forbanner tidens elv	Harvill Secker	
Longlist	Véronique Olmi	France	French	Adriana Hunter	Beside the Sea; Bord de mer	Peirene Press	
Longlist	David Grossman	Israel	Hebrew	Jessica Cohen	To the End of the Land אשה בורחת מבשורה	Jonathan Cape	
Longlist	Daniel Kehlmann	Germany; Austria	German	Carol Brown Janeway	Fame; Ruhm	Quercus	
Longlist	Juan Gabriel Vásquez	Colombia	Spanish	Anne McLean	The Secret History of Costaguana; Historia secreta de Costaguana	Bloomsbury	
Longlist	Michał Witkowski	Poland	Polish	W. Martin	Lovetown; Lubiewo	Portobello Books	
Longlist	Jáchym Topol	Czechia	Czech	David Short	Gargling with Tar; Kloktat dehet	Portobello Books	
Longlist	Juli Zeh	Germany	German	Christine Lo	Dark Matter; Schilf	Harvill Secker	
Longlist	Shuichi Yoshida	Japan	Japanese	Philip Gabriel	Villain 悪人	Harvill Secker	
Longlist	Per Wästberg	Sweden	Swedish	Tom Geddes	The Journey of Anders Sparrman; Anders Sparrmans resa	Granta	

=== 2012 ===
Award	Author	Country	Language	Translator	Title Original title	Publisher	Notes
Winner	Aharon Appelfeld	Israel	Hebrew	Jeffrey M. Green	Blooms of Darkness פרחי האפלה	Alma Books	
Shortlist	Judith Hermann	Germany	German	Margot Bettauer Dembo	Alice	Clerkenwell Press	
Shortlist	Yan Lianke	China	Chinese	Cindy Carter	Dream of Ding Village 丁庄梦	Corsair	
Shortlist	Sjón	Iceland	Icelandic	Victoria Cribb	From the Mouth of the Whale; Rökkurbýsnir	Telegram Books	
Shortlist	Diego Marani	Italy	Italian	Judith Landry	New Finnish Grammar; Nuova grammatica finlandese	Dedalus Books	
Shortlist	Umberto Eco	Italy	Italian	Richard Dixon	The Prague Cemetery; Il cimitero di Praga	Harvill Secker	
Longlist	Haruki Murakami	Japan	Japanese	Jay Rubin	1Q84 (Book 1 and 2)	Harvill Secker	
Longlist	Steve Sem-Sandberg	Sweden	Swedish	Sarah Death	The Emperor of Lies; De fattiga i Łódź	Faber & Faber	
Longlist	Tristan Garcia	France	French	Marion Duvert; Lorin Stein	Hate: A Romance; La meilleure part des hommes	Faber & Faber	
Longlist	Matthias Politycki	Germany	German	Anthea Bell	Next World Novella; Jenseitsnovelle	Peirene Press	
Longlist	Péter Nádas	Hungary	Hungarian	Imre Goldstein	Parallel Stories; Párhuzamos történetek	Jonathan Cape	
Longlist	Shin Kyung-sook	South Korea	Korean	Chi-Young Kim	Please Look After Mom 엄마를 부탁해	Weidenfeld & Nicolson	
Longlist	Dag Solstad	Norway	Norwegian	Agnes Scott Langeland	Professor Andersen's Night; Professor Andersens natt	Harvill Secker	
Longlist	Amos Oz	Israel	Hebrew	Nicholas De Lange	Scenes from Village Life תמונות מחיי הכפר	Chatto & Windus	
Longlist	Bernardo Atxaga	Spain	Basque	Margaret Jull Costa (translation from Spanish)	Seven Houses in France; Zazpi etxe Frantzian	Harvill Secker	

=== 2013 ===
Award	Author	Country	Language	Translator	Title Original title	Publisher	Notes
Winner	Gerbrand Bakker	Netherlands	Dutch	David Colmer	The Detour; De omweg	Harvill Secker	
Shortlist	Chris Barnard	South Africa	Afrikaans	Michiel Heyns	Bundu; Boendoe	Alma Books	
Shortlist	Daša Drndić	Croatia	Croatian	Ellen Elias-Bursać	Trieste; Sonnenschein	MacLehose Press	
Shortlist	Ismail Kadare	Albania	Albanian	John Hodgson	The Fall of the Stone City; Darka e gabuar	Canongate Books	
Shortlist	Andrés Neuman	Argentina	Spanish	Nick Caistor; Lorenza García	Traveller of the Century; El viajero del siglo	Pushkin Press	
Shortlist	Enrique Vila-Matas	Spain	Spanish	Rosalind Harvey; Anne McLean	Dublinesque; Dublinesca	Harvill Secker	
Longlist	Laurent Binet	France	French	Sam Taylor	HHhH	Harvill Secker	
Longlist	Paweł Huelle	Poland	Polish	Antonia Lloyd-Jones	Cold Sea Stories; Opowieści chłodnego morza	Comma Press	
Longlist	Pia Juul	Denmark	Danish	Martin Aitken	The Murder of Halland; Mordet på Halland	Peirene Press	
Longlist	Khaled Khalifa	Syria	Arabic	Leri Price	In Praise of Hatred مدح الكراهية	Doubleday	
Longlist	Karl Ove Knausgård	Norway	Norwegian	Don Bartlett	My Struggle 1: A Death in the Family; Min kamp: Første bok	Harvill Secker	
Longlist	László Krasznahorkai	Hungary	Hungarian	George Szirtes	Satantango; Sátántangó	Tuskar Rock	
Longlist	Alain Mabanckou	Congo; France	French	Sarah Ardizzone	Black Bazaar; Black Bazar	Serpent's Tail	
Longlist	Diego Marani	Italy	Italian	Judith Landry	The Last of the Vostyachs; L'ultimo dei Vostiachi	Dedalus Books	
Longlist	Orhan Pamuk	Turkey	Turkish	Robert Finn	Silent House; Sessiz Ev	Faber & Faber	
Longlist	Juan Gabriel Vásquez	Colombia	Spanish	Anne McLean	The Sound of Things Falling; El ruido de las cosas al caer	Bloomsbury	

=== 2014 ===
Award	Author	Country	Language	Translator	Title Original title	Notes
Winner	Hassan Blasim	Iraq; Finland	Arabic	Jonathan Wright	The Iraqi Christ المسيح العراقي	
Special mention	Birgit Vanderbeke	Germany	German	Jamie Bulloch	The Mussel Feast; Das Muschelessen	
Shortlist	Karl Ove Knausgård	Norway	Norwegian	Don Bartlett	My Struggle 2: A Man in Love; Min kamp: Andre bok	
Shortlist	Hiromi Kawakami	Japan	Japanese	Allison Markin Powell	Strange Weather in Tokyo センセイの鞄	
Shortlist	Hubert Mingarelli	France	French	Sam Taylor	A Meal in Winter; Un repas en hiver	
Shortlist	Yōko Ogawa	Japan	Japanese	Stephen Snyder	Revenge: Eleven Dark Tales 寡黙な死骸みだらな弔い	
Longlist	Sinan Antoon	Iraq	Arabic	Sinan Antoon	The Corpse Washer وحدها شجرة الرمان	
Longlist	Julia Franck	Germany	German	Anthea Bell	Back to Back; Rücken an Rücken	
Longlist	Sayed Kashua	Israel	Hebrew	Mitch Ginsberg	Exposure גוף שני יחיד	
Longlist	Andrej Longo	Italy	Italian	Howard Curtis	Ten; Dieci	
Longlist	Ma Jian	China; United Kingdom	Chinese	Flora Drew	The Dark Road 阴之道	
Longlist	Andreï Makine	Russia; France	French	Geoffrey Strachan	Brief Loves That Live Forever; Le livre des brèves amours éternelles	
Longlist	Javier Marías	Spain	Spanish	Margaret Jull Costa	The Infatuations; Los enamoramientos	
Longlist	Auður Ava Ólafsdóttir	Iceland	Icelandic	Brian FitzGibbon	Butterflies in November; Rigning í nóvember	
Longlist	Jón Kalman Stefánsson	Iceland	Icelandic	Philip Roughton	The Sorrow of Angels; Harmur englanna	

=== 2015 ===
Award	Author	Country	Language	Translator	Title Original title	Notes
Winner	Jenny Erpenbeck	Germany	German	Susan Bernofsky	The End of Days; Aller Tage Abend	
Shortlist	Juan Tomás Ávila Laurel	Equatorial Guinea	Spanish	Jethro Soutar	By Night the Mountain Burns; Arde el monte de noche	
Shortlist	Haruki Murakami	Japan	Japanese	Philip Gabriel	Colorless Tsukuru Tazaki and His Years of Pilgrimage 色彩を持たない多崎つくると、彼の巡礼の年	
Shortlist	Daniel Kehlmann	Germany	German	Carol Brown Janeway	F	
Shortlist	Tomás González	Colombia	Spanish	Frank Wynne	In the Beginning Was the Sea; Primero estaba el mar	
Shortlist	Erwin Mortier	Belgium	Dutch	Paul Vincent	While the Gods Were Sleeping; Godenslaap	
Longlist	Tomas Bannerhed	Sweden	Swedish	Sarah Death	The Ravens; Korparna	
Longlist	Marcello Fois	Italy	Italian	Silvester Mazzarella	Bloodlines; Stirpe	
Longlist	Hamid Ismailov	Uzbekistan; United Kingdom	Russian	Andrew Bromfield	The Dead Lake; Вундеркинд Ержан	
Longlist	Karl Ove Knausgård	Norway	Norwegian	Don Bartlett	My Struggle 3: Boyhood Island; Min kamp: Tredje bok	
Longlist	Lee Jung-myung	South Korea	Korean	Chi-Young Kim	The Investigation 별을 스치는 바람	
Longlist	Judith Schalansky	Germany	German	Shaun Whiteside	The Giraffe's Neck; Der Hals der Giraffe	
Longlist	Stefanie de Velasco	Germany	German	Tim Mohr	Tiger Milk; Tigermilch	
Longlist	Timur Vermes	Germany	German	Jamie Bulloch	Look Who's Back; Er ist wieder da	
Longlist	Can Xue	China	Chinese	Annelise Finegan Wasmoen	The Last Lover 最后的情人	

== Summary of prize recipients ==
No prize awarded from 1996 through 2000. Merged with the International Booker Prize after the award of the 2015 prize.

Year	Recipient	Title	Original title	Translator	Original language
1990	Orhan Pamuk	The White Castle	Beyaz Kale	Victoria Holbrook	Turkish
1991	Milan Kundera	Immortality	Nesmrtelnost	Peter Kussi	Czech
1992	Simon Leys	The Death of Napoleon	La Mort de Napoléon	Patricia Clancy	French
1993	José Saramago	The Year of the Death of Ricardo Reis	O Ano da Morte de Ricardo Reis	Giovanni Pontiero	Portuguese
1994	Bảo Ninh	The Sorrow of War	Nỗi buồn chiến tranh	Frank Palmos and Phanh Thanh Hao	Vietnamese
1995	Gert Hofmann	The Film Explainer	Der Kinoerzähler	Michael Hofmann	German
2001	Marta Morazzoni	The Alphonse Courrier Affair	Il caso Courrier	Emma Rose	Italian
2002	W.G. Sebald (posthumously)	Austerlitz		Anthea Bell	German
2003	Per Olov Enquist	The Visit of the Royal Physician	Livläkarens besök	Tiina Nunnally	Swedish
2004	Javier Cercas	Soldiers of Salamis	Soldados de Salamina	Anne McLean	Spanish
2005	Frédéric Beigbeder	Windows on the World		Frank Wynne	French
2006	Per Petterson	Out Stealing Horses	Ut og stjæle hester	Anne Born	Norwegian
2007	José Eduardo Agualusa	The Book of Chameleons	O Livro dos Camaleões	Daniel Hahn	Portuguese
2008	Paul Verhaeghen	Omega Minor		Paul Verhaeghen	Dutch
2009	Evelio Rosero	The Armies	Los ejércitos	Anne McLean	Spanish
2010	Philippe Claudel	Brodeck's Report	Le Rapport de Brodeck	John Cullen	French
2011	Santiago Roncagliolo	Red April	Abril rojo	Edith Grossman	Spanish
2012	Aharon Appelfeld	Blooms of Darkness	פרחי האפלה	Jeffrey M. Green	Hebrew
2013	Gerbrand Bakker	The Detour	De omweg	David Colmer	Dutch
2014	Hassan Blasim	The Iraqi Christ	المسيح العراقي	Jonathan Wright	Arabic
2015	Jenny Erpenbeck	The End of Days	Aller Tage Abend	Susan Bernofsky	German
