= Michael Berry (author) =

American author

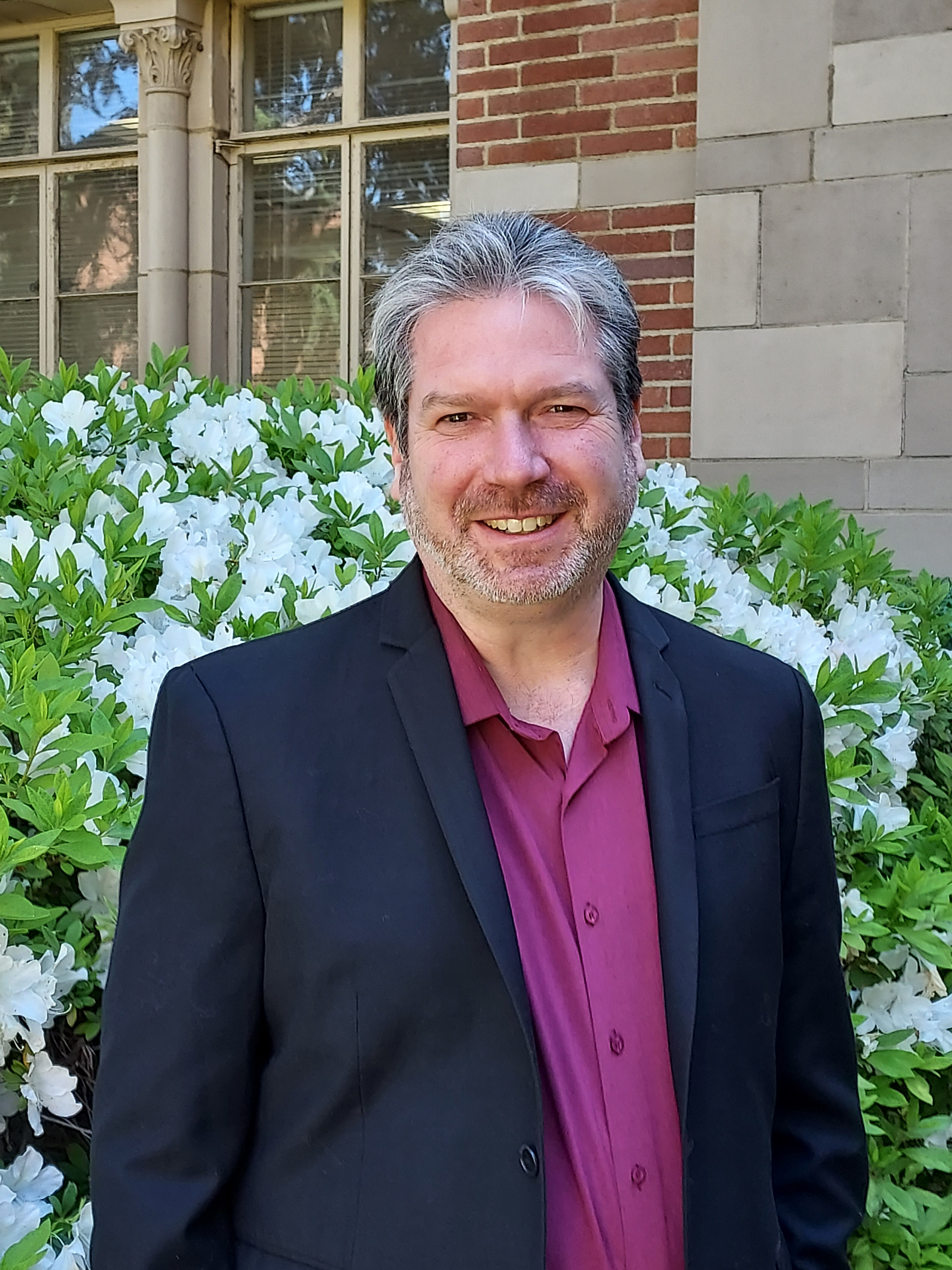
- Berry in 2023
- Born: May 1, 1974 (age 52); Chicago, Illinois, U.S.
- Occupations: Author, translator, professor

Academic background
- Education: Rutgers University (BA); Columbia University (MA, PhD)

Academic work
- Discipline: Sinology
- Sub-discipline: Chinese literature and film
- Institutions: University of California, Santa Barbara (2003–2016); University of California, Los Angeles (2016–present)
- Website: michael-berry.com

Michael Berry (Chinese: 白睿文; pinyin: Bái Ruìwén; born May 1, 1974) is an American sinologist and translator specializing in Chinese literature and film. He is a professor of contemporary Chinese Cultural studies at the University of California, Los Angeles (UCLA), where he is the director of the Center for Chinese Studies.

== Early life and education ==
Berry was born in Chicago, Illinois, and raised in Freehold, New Jersey. When he was nineteen years old, Berry studied Mandarin Chinese at Nanjing University. He graduated from Rutgers University with a Bachelor of Arts and, as undergraduate, studied Chinese in Taiwan at National Taiwan Normal University. He then earned an M.A. and Ph.D. in modern Chinese literature and film studies at Columbia University in 2004.

== Career ==
Berry joined the faculty at the University of California, Santa Barbara (UCSB) in 2003, where he taught for over a decade and served as Director of the East Asia Center. He was promoted to Associate Professor with tenure in 2006 and to full Professor in 2011.

In 2016, he joined the faculty at the University of California, Los Angeles (UCLA) as Professor of Contemporary Chinese Cultural Studies in the Department of Asian Languages and Cultures. He also holds a courtesy appointment in the Department of Film, Television and Digital Media and serves as Director of the Center for Chinese Studies.

Berry’s research focuses on Chinese literature, cinema, trauma studies, and translation studies. He has authored and edited several scholarly works and has translated contemporary Chinese authors into English. He has also published numerous book-length oral history projects in both English and Chinese, which have chronicled the work of major Chinese culture figures such as Hou Hsiao-hsien, Jia Zhangke, Ann Hui, and Cui Zi'en. His literary translations of contemporary Chinese writers, such as Yu Hua, Wang Anyi, and Fang Fang have won numerous awards and also generated controversy.

== Awards and recognition ==
Berry has received a number of honors, including a Guggenheim Fellowship in 2023, the Baifang Schell Book Prize in 2025, and two fellowships from the National Endowment for the Arts for literary translation.

== Public controversies ==
In 2018, Berry served on the jury of the Golden Horse Awards, where remarks by Taiwanese filmmaker Fu Yue sparked political controversy involving Cross-Strait relations.

In 2020, his English translation of Fang Fang’s Wuhan Diary became the subject of international debate and criticism amid discussions about censorship and the global reception of Chinese narratives of the COVID-19 pandemic.

== Selected works ==
=== Research monographs ===
- A History of Pain: Trauma in Modern Chinese Literature and Film. Global Chinese culture. New York Chichester: Columbia University Press. 2011. ISBN 9780231141628.
  - Republished Rye Field, 2016
- Jia Zhangke’s Hometown Trilogy (British Film Institute / Palgrave Macmillan, 2009; Guangxi Normal, 2011)
- Translation, Disinformation, and Wuhan Diary: Anatomy of a Transpacific Cyber Campaign. Palgrave Macmillan. 2022. ISBN 9783031168581.

=== Oral history projects ===
- Berry, Michael (2005). Speaking in Images: Interviews with Contemporary Chinese Filmmakers. Global Chinese culture. New York Chichester: Columbia University Press. ISBN 978-0-231-13331-9.
- Jia Zhangke on Jia Zhangke (Duke University Press, 2022; Showwe, 2021; Guangxi Normal, 2021)
- Boiling the Sea: Hou Hsiao-hsien’s Memories of Shadows and Light (INK,2014; Guangxi Normal, 2015)
- Voiceover: Conversations with Contemporary Chinese Filmmakers (Showwe, 2023)
- Enter the Clowns: Cui Zi’en’s Chinese Queer Cinema (Showwe, 2022)
- Between the Lines: Conversations with Contemporary Sinophone Writers (Two volumes, Showwe, 2025)
- Boiling the Sea: Hou Hsiao-hsien on Hou Hsiao-hsien (University of California Press, 2027)

=== Edited volumes ===
- Divided Lenses: Film and War Memory in Asia. University of Hawai‘i Press. 2016.
- The Musha Incident: A Reader on the Indigenous Taiwan Uprising (Columbia University Press, 2022; Rye Field, 2020)
- The Wu Ming-Yi Companion: Literature, Environment, and Translation through Compound Eyes. Cambria Press. 2026. ISBN 9781638573388.
- Modernism Revisited: Pai Hsien-yung, Modern Literature and Modernism. Rye Field Publishing. 2016.

=== Translations ===
- Chang Ta-chun (2000). Wild Kids: Two Novels about Growing Up. Columbia University Press.
- Ye Zhaoyan (2002). Nanjing 1937: A Love Story. Columbia University Press.
- Yu Hua (2003). To Live. Anchor Books.
- Wang Anyi (2008). 長恨歌 [The Song of Everlasting Sorrow] (in Chinese). Columbia University Press.
- Remains of Life by Wu He (Columbia University Press, 2017)
- Fang Fang (2020). Wuhan Diary: Dispatches from a Quarantined City. HarperVia.
- Han Song (2023). Hospital. Amazon Crossing.
- Han Song (2023). Exorcism. Amazon Crossing.
- The Running Flame by Fang Fang (Columbia University Press, 2025)
- Fang Fang (2025). Soft Burial. Columbia University Press.
- The Privileged: A Novel by Wu Xiaole (Amazon Crossing, 2025)
- Dead Souls by Han Song (Amazon Crossing, 2025)
