= Ravens (2017 film) =

- English-language promotional poster
- Swedish: Korparna
- Directed by: Jens Assur
- Screenplay by: Jens Assur
- Based on: Korparna by Tomas Bannerhed
- Produced by: Jan Marnell; Tom Persson; Jens Assur
- Starring: Reine Brynolfsson; Maria Heiskanen; Jacob Nordström; Peter Dalle; Roger Storm
- Cinematography: Jonas Alarik
- Music by: Peter von Poehl
- Production companies: Film and Art Affairs II AB
- Distributed by: Triart Film AB
- Release dates: September 8, 2017 (Toronto); October 13, 2017
- Running time: 107 minutes
- Country: Sweden
- Language: Swedish

Ravens (Swedish: Korparna) is a 2017 Swedish thriller film directed by Jens Assur, based on the novel Korparna by Tomas Bannerhed.

== Plot ==
In the 1970s Sweden, the farmer Agne (Reine Brynolfsson) is plagued by the work on the farm, and by the feeling that someone wants his family bad. The oldest son Klas (Jakob Nordström), who Agne wants to take over the farm, seeks himself to the worlds of birds, but as the outer threats increase, he faces an inevitable choice, fly or stay.

== Cast ==
- Reine Brynolfsson as Agne
- Maria Heiskanen as Gärd
- Jakob Nordström as Klas
- Roger Storm as Alvar
- Peter Dalle as Krister
- Saga Samuelsson as Veronika
- Jens Jørn Spottag as Carsten
- Gösta Viklund as Göran
- Max Vobora as Pelle Bula
- Donald Högberg as Lecturer
- Etienne Glaser as Schoolmaster
- Annika Hallin as Veronika's mother
- Åsa Jansson as Librarian
- Lars-Gunnar Aronsson as Butcher

== Reception ==
=== Critical response ===
Ravens received mostly positive reception by the Swedish critics, with many celebrated the film for its acting and cinematography, while others criticized it for having a long runtime, and the lack of dialogue.

=== Accolades ===
Award	Date of ceremony	Category	Recipient(s)	Result	Ref(s)
Guldbagge Awards	22 January 2018	Best Film	Jan Marnell, Tom Persson and Jens Assur (Producers)	Nominated	
Guldbagge Awards	22 January 2018	Best Actor	Reine Brynolfsson	Nominated	
Guldbagge Awards	22 January 2018	Best Supporting Actress	Maria Heiskanen	Nominated	
Guldbagge Awards	22 January 2018	Best Cinematography	Jonas Alarik	Nominated	
Guldbagge Awards	22 January 2018	Best Sound Editing	Mattias Eklund	Nominated	
Guldbagge Awards	22 January 2018	Best Original Score	Peter von Poehl	Won	
Guldbagge Awards	22 January 2018	Best Visual Effects	Torbjörn Olsson	Nominated	
Tbilisi International Film Festival	4–10 October 2017	Golden Prometheus for the Best Picture	Jens Assur	Won	
Thessaloniki International Film Festival	2–12 November 2017	Best Full-length Feature Film Award - Golden Alexander	Jens Assur	Won	
