= Same-sex adoption =

Adoption of children by same-sex couples

Same-sex adoption is the adoption of children or adults by same-sex couples. It may take the form of a joint adoption by the couple, or of the adoption by one partner of the other's biological child or adult (stepchild adoption).

Joint adoption by same-sex couples is permitted in 40 countries. Most countries and territories that allow same-sex marriage (exceptions being Aruba, Curaçao, Ecuador and several Mexican states), as well as several countries and dependent territories that do not (Croatia, Israel, Italy and two UK territories of Bermuda and the Cayman Islands) allow for same-sex joint adoption. In some of the countries with marriage, legislation for adoption preceded that for marriage.

According to U.S. census data, 54% of children adopted by gay male couples were boys. Among female couples, 56% were girls.

Adoption is only permitted for same sex married couples in 21 of the 31 Mexican states and Mexico City, despite a Supreme Court ruling that requires states to allow it. Stepchild adoption is permitted for same-sex couples in two countries without same-sex marriage – San Marino and the Czech Republic permit step-child adoption in which the registered partner can adopt the biological and, in some cases, the adopted child of their partner.

Given that constitutions and statutes usually do not address the adoption rights of same-sex couples, judicial decisions often determine whether they can serve as parents either individually or as couples. Opponents of adoption by same-sex couples have argued that same-sex parenting adversely affects children. However, research consistently shows that gay and lesbian parents are as fit and capable as heterosexual parents, and their children are as psychologically healthy and well-adjusted as those reared by heterosexual parents.

Same-sex parents pursuing adoption must also contend with social pressures to conform to heteronormative gender roles. The concept of gender role models is necessitated by the bureaucratic organization of foster care and adoption agencies, particularly in the United States.

== LGBTQ parenting ==
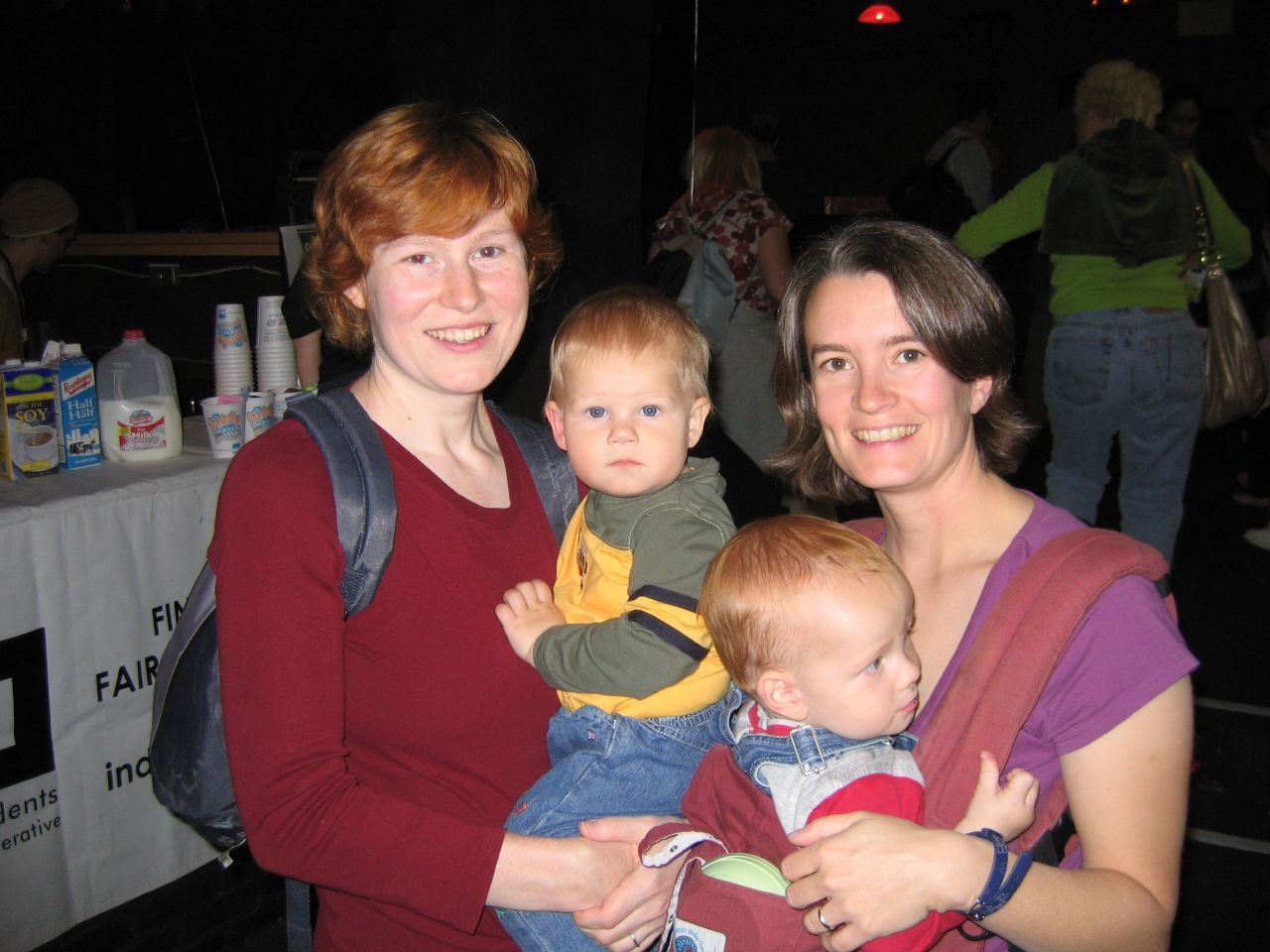
Lesbian couple with children

=== Prevalence of adoption ===
Statistics on the prevalence of adoption by same-sex couples across countries where it is legal are not consistently available.

In 2022, 1 in 6 adoptions in England were by same-sex couples. This number was a 17.4% rise from the previous year.

In the United States, as of 2024, 18% of all LGBTQ people (~2.57 million adults) parent children in their homes, with 14% of same-sex couples (167,000) parenting a minor in their homes. 21% of same-sex couples adopt which is a much higher rate than in different-sex couples (3%).

=== Quality of life outcomes ===
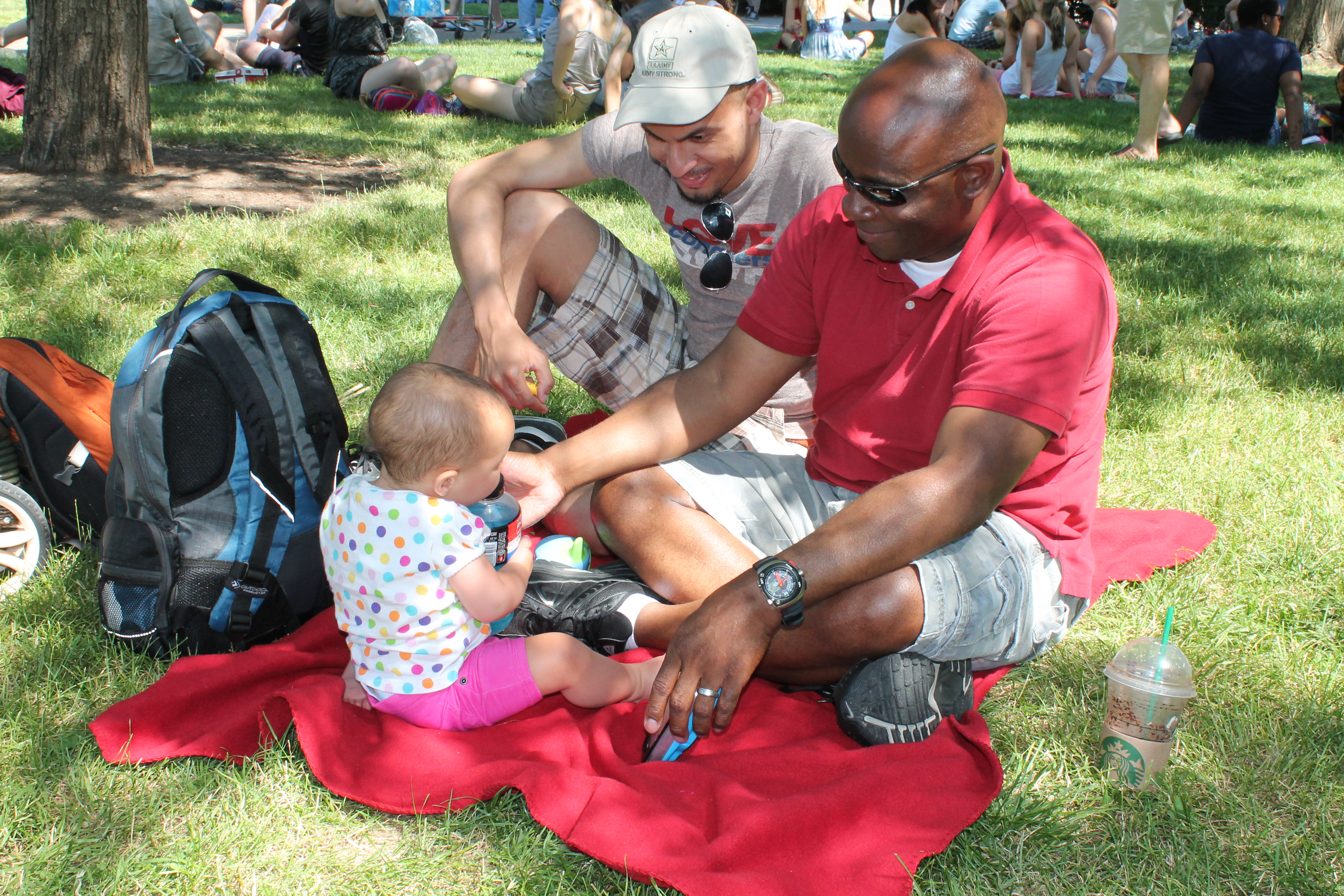
A gay couple with a child

A common argument against the legalization of same-sex adoption is that children adopted by same-sex couples would have poorer quality of life outcomes. Overall, scientific research indicates that the children of same-sex couples fare just as well as the children of different-sex couples.

A 2004 study concluded that the sexual orientation of parents did not predict better or poorer "adoptive family functioning, adopted child's behavior, and parent's perceptions of helpfulness from family support networks".

A 2010 study evaluated the outcomes of young adopted children who had been placed in one of 56 lesbian and gay households since infancy. The study found no significant associations between parental sexual orientation and child adjustment.

Research published in 2009 studied 1,384 children with either heterosexual or same-sex adoptive parents and concluded that problematic behavior in children was not dependent on whether they had same-sex or opposite sex parents. The study also found that "adoptive parents are likely to encounter similar challenges in terms of risk factors for child behavioral problems and mitigating factors of such behavior."

A 2016 study of adopted children of same-sex parents showed that they perceive themselves to be more accepting, understanding and compassionate than children of different-sex parents. The children in the study also indicated that they often avoid sharing that their parents are lesbian or gay, and that many experience bullying or teasing.

== Debate ==
=== Arguments ===
The adoption of children by LGBTQ people is an issue of active debate. In the United States, for example, legislation to prevent adoption by LGBTQ people has been introduced in many jurisdictions; such efforts have largely been defeated. Prior to 1973, state courts commonly barred gay and lesbian individuals from holding a parenting role, especially through adoption.

Major professional organizations have made statements in defense of adoption by same-sex couples. The American Psychological Association has supported adoption by same-sex couples, citing social prejudice as harming the psychological health of lesbians and gays while noting there is no evidence that their parenting causes harm. The American Medical Association has issued a similar position supporting second parent adoption by same-sex partner, stating that lack of formal recognition can cause health-care disparities for children of same-sex parents.

The following arguments are made in support of adoption by LGBTQ parents:

- The right of a child to have a family, guardians or people who can take care of their wellbeing.
- Human rights – child's and parent's right to have a family life.
- There are almost no differences between children raised by same-sex or straight couples. For that reason, sexual orientation of the parents has almost no relevance when it comes to raising a child.
- Evidence confirming that, despite the claims of those opposed to LGBTQ parenting, same-sex couples can provide good conditions to raise a child.
- For children, adoption is a better alternative to orphanage.
- Fewer formalities for step-parents in everyday life, as well as the situation of a death of a biological parent of a child.

=== Public opinion ===
Indicates the country/territory has legalized same-sex adoption nationwide
Indicates that same-sex adoption is legal in certain parts of the country
Indicates that the country has step-child adoption or partner-guardianship

Opinion polls for same-sex adoption in Europe
Country	Pollster	Year	For	Against	Don't know/neutral/no answer/other
Austria	Eurobarometer	2023	65%	30%	5%
Belgium	Ipsos	2025	70%	23%	7%
Bulgaria	Eurobarometer	2006	12%	68%	20%
Croatia	Promocija Plus	2025	28%	52%	20%
Cyprus	Eurobarometer	2006	10%	86%	4%
Czech Republic	CVVM	2019	47%	47%	6%
Denmark	Pew Research Center	2017	75%	-	-
Estonia	HumanrightsEE	2023	47%	44%	9%
Finland	Taloustutkimus	2013	51%	42%	7%
France	Ipsos	2025	66%	26%	8%
Germany	Ipsos	2025	74%	19%	7%
Greece	KAPA Research	2023	53%	41%	6%
Hungary	Ipsos	2025	62%	39%	1%
Ireland	Red C Poll	2011	60%	-	-
Italy	Eurispes	2023	50.4%	49.6%	0%
Latvia	SKDS	2023	27%	23%	46%
Lithuania	Eurobarometer	2006	12%	82%	6%
Luxembourg	Politmonitor	2013	55%	44%	1%
Malta	Misco	2014	20%	80%	-
Netherlands	Ipsos	2025	76%	20%	4%
Norway	YouGov	2012	54%	34%	12%
Poland	Ipsos	2025	32%	66%	2%
Portugal	Pew Research Center	2017	59%	28%	13%
Romania	Eurobarometer	2006	8%	82%	10%
Russia	Ipsos	2021	23%	67%	10%
Serbia	Civil Rights Defenders	2020	22.5%	-	-
Slovakia	Eurobarometer	2006	12%	84%	4%
Slovenia	Delo Stik	2015	38%	55%	7%
Spain	Ipsos	2025	73%	20%	7%
Sweden	Ipsos	2025	79%	16%	5%
Switzerland	Pink Cross	2020	67%	30%	3%
Ukraine	Kyiv International Institute of Sociology	2023	30%	48%	22%
United Kingdom	Ipsos	2021	72%	19%	9%

Indicates the country/territory has legalized same-sex adoption nationwide
Indicates that same-sex adoption is legal in certain parts of the country
Indicates that the country has step-child adoption or partner-guardianship

Opinion polls for same-sex adoption in Americas
Country	Pollster	Year	For	Against	Don't know/neutral/no answer/other
Argentina	Ipsos	2023	71%	24%	6%
Brazil	Ipsos	2023	69%	22%	9%
Canada	Ipsos	2023	74%	17%	9%
Chile	CADEM	2022	70%	28%	2%
Colombia	Ipsos	2023	53%	40%	7%
Mexico	Ipsos	2023	60%	34%	6%
Peru	Ipsos	2023	51%	42%	7%
United States	Ipsos	2023	64%	26%	10%
Uruguay	Equipos Consultores	2013	52%	39%	9%
Venezuela	Equilibrium Cende	2023	48% (55%)	39% (45%)	13%

Indicates the country/territory has legalized same-sex adoption nationwide
Indicates that same-sex adoption is legal in certain parts of the country
Indicates that the country has step-child adoption or partner-guardianship

Opinion polls for same-sex adoption in Oceania
Country	Pollster	Year	For	Against	Don't know/neutral/no answer/other
Australia	Ipsos	2025	72%	22%	6%
New Zealand	Research New Zealand	2012	64%	31%	5%

Indicates the country/territory has legalized same-sex adoption nationwide
Indicates that same-sex adoption is legal in certain parts of the country
Indicates that the country has step-child adoption or partner-guardianship

Opinion polls for same-sex adoption in Asia
Country	Pollster	Year	For	Against	Don't know/neutral/no answer/other
China	Ipsos	2021	66%	30%	4%
India	Ipsos	2021	66%	21%	13%
Israel	Midgam Institute	2017	60%	-	-
Japan	Ipsos	2025	66%	24%	10%
Malaysia	Ipsos	2021	24%	65%	11%
Russia	Ipsos	2021	23%	67%	10%
South Korea	Ipsos	2025	41%	48%	11%
Turkey	Ipsos	2025	26%	62%	12%

Indicates the country/territory has legalized same-sex adoption nationwide
Indicates that same-sex adoption is legal in certain parts of the country
Indicates that the country has step-child adoption or partner-guardianship
Indicates that same-sex sexual activity is illegal

Opinion polls for same-sex adoption in Africa
Country	Pollster	Year	For (Note: Because some polls do not report 'neither', those that do are listed with simple yes/no percentages in parentheses, so their figures can be compared.)	Against	Neither (Note: Comprises: Neutral, don't know, no answer, other, refused.)	Margin of error
Kenya	Pew Research Center	2023	9%	90%	1%	±3.6%
Nigeria	Pew Research Center	2023	2%	97%	1%	±3.6%
South Africa	Ipsos	2023	57% (66%)	29% [10% support some rights] (34%)	14%	±3.5% (Note: [+ more urban/educated than representative])
South Africa	Pew Research Center	2023	38%	58%	4%	±3.6%

== Legal status ==
Legal status of adoption by same-sex couples around the world: Joint adoption by same-sex couples allowed Only second-parent adoption allowed Adoption not available to married same-sex couples Neither same-sex adoption nor same-sex marriage allowed

Joint adoption by same-sex couples is legal in the following 40 countries, Mexico in some states:

- Andorra (2014)
- Argentina (2010)
- Australia (first jurisdiction 2002, last jurisdiction 2018)
- Austria (2016)
- Belgium (2006)
- Brazil (2010)
- Canada (first jurisdiction 1996, last jurisdiction 2011)
- Chile (2022)
- Colombia (2015)
- Costa Rica (2020)
- Croatia (2022)
- Cuba (2022)
- Denmark (2010)
  - Greenland (2016)
  - Faroe Islands (2017)
- Estonia (2024)
- Finland (2017)
- France (2013)
- Germany (2017)
- Greece (2024)
- Iceland (2006)
- Ireland (2016)
- Israel (2023)
- Italy (2026, only adults)
- Liechtenstein (2023)
- Luxembourg (2015)
- Malta (2014)
- Netherlands (2001)
- New Zealand (2013)
- Norway (2009)
- Portugal (2016)
- Slovenia (2022)
- South Africa (2002)
- Spain (2005)
- Sweden (2003)
- Switzerland (2022)
- Taiwan (2023)
- Thailand (2025)
- United Kingdom
  - England and Wales (2005)
  - Scotland (2009)
  - Northern Ireland (2013)
- United States (first jurisdiction 1993, last jurisdiction 2017)
- Uruguay (2009)

Joint adoption by same-sex couples is legal in the following subnational jurisdictions or dependent territories:

- UK Crown Dependencies and British Overseas Territories:
  - Bermuda (2015)
  - Cayman Islands (2019)
  - Gibraltar (2014)
  - Guernsey (2017)
  - Isle of Man (2011)
  - Jersey (2012)
  - Pitcairn Islands (2015)
  - Falkland Islands (2017)
  - Saint Helena, Ascension and Tristan da Cunha (2017)
- Mexico:
  - Aguascalientes (2019)
  - Baja California (2017)
  - Baja California Sur (2022)
  - Campeche (2016)
  - Chiapas (2017)
  - Chihuahua (2017)
  - Coahuila (2014)
  - Colima (2016)
  - Durango (2022 – prohibition never existed)
  - Jalisco (2019)
  - Hidalgo (2019)
  - Mexico City (2010)
  - Michoacán (2016)
  - Morelos (2016)
  - Nayarit (2019)
  - Nuevo León (2019)
  - Puebla (2017)
  - Querétaro (2017)
  - Quintana Roo (2022)
  - San Luis Potosí (2019)
  - Tamaulipas (prior to 2022 – there is no prohibition)
  - Veracruz (2016)
- Caribbean Netherlands (2012)

The following countries permit step-child adoption in which the partner in a relationship can adopt the natural and/or the adopted child of his or her partner:

- San Marino (2018)
- Czech Republic (2025)

Step-child adoption is legal in the following subnational jurisdictions or dependent territories:

- Hong Kong (2021)

In Italy step-child adoption can only be recognized by court order since 2016.

=== Africa ===
==== South Africa ====
South Africa is the only African country to allow joint adoption by same-sex couples. The 2002 decision of the Constitutional Court in the case of Du Toit v Minister of Welfare and Population Development amended the Child Care Act, 1983 to allow both joint adoption and step-parent adoption by "permanent same-sex life partners". The Child Care Act has since been replaced by the Children's Act, 2005, which allows joint adoption by "partners in a permanent domestic life-partnership", whether same- or opposite-sex, and step-parent adoption by a person who is the "permanent domestic life-partner" of the child's current parent. Same-sex marriage has been legal since 2006, and is equivalent to opposite-sex marriage for all purposes, including adoption.

=== Americas ===
Legal status in the states of Mexico: Joint adoption by same-sex couples allowed No laws allowing adoption by married same-sex couples

Legal status of adoption by same sex couples in South America: Couple adoption legal Couple adoption illegal Same-sex sexual activity illegal Unknown/ambiguous

==== Argentina ====
Argentina allows adoption by same and different-sex marriages, and even by single people, since 2010. The law makes no difference in the requirements for adoption for any of these.

==== Canada ====
Canada has no nation-wide law legalizing same-sex adoption, but rather has smaller provincial laws that cover the entire nation. Same-sex adoption legalization in Canada began with British Columbia in 1996 and was finalized with Nunavut in 2011. By 2013, an Ipsos Global poll showed 70% of Canadians approved of same-sex adoption to some degree with 45% strongly approving.

==== Chile ====
Since 10 March 2022 joint parenthood of same-sex couples is legal in Chile after the entry into force of Law 21,400 on Equal Marriage, which explicitly guarantees non-discrimination based on sexual orientation and gender identity for custody purposes, filiation and adoption whether or not the couples are married or whether or not they had their children through assisted human fertilization. The law amends the Civil Code to recognize the parents of children as their mother and/or father, their two mothers, or their two fathers.

A 2021 survey, shows that 65% of Chileans support same-sex adoption.

==== Colombia ====
On 4 November 2015, in a 6–2 Constitutional Court ruling, Colombia decided to allow adoption by LGBTQ peoples. The ruling came before same-sex marriage became legal in the country on 28 April 2016.

==== Cuba ====
Cuba allows adoption by same-sex marriages (since September 2022 referendum) and different-sex marriages, and even by single people.

==== Honduras ====
As of May 2019, the Honduras Supreme Court is expected to rule on a decision regarding both same-sex marriage and adoption.

==== Mexico ====
Same-sex couples are able to adopt in Mexico City (since 2010), Coahuila (2014), Campeche (2016), Colima (2016), Michoacán (2016), Morelos (2016), Veracruz (2016), Baja California (2017), Chihuahua (2017), Querétaro (2017), Puebla (2018), Chiapas (2018), Nayarit (2019), Aguascalientes (2019), Hidalgo (2019), San Luis Potosí (2019), Quintana Roo (2022), Yucatán (2022), Durango (2022), Tamaulipas (2022), Guerrero (2022), Nuevo León (2023), Tabasco (2024).

In Mexico City, the Legislative Assembly of the Federal District passed legislation on 21 December 2009 enabling same-sex couples to adopt children. Eight days later, Head of Government ("Mayor") Marcelo Ebrard signed the bill into law, which officially took effect on 4 March 2010.

On 24 November 2011, the Coahuila Supreme Court struck down the state's law barring same-sex couples from adopting, urging the state's legislature to amend the adoption law as soon as possible. On 12 February 2014, the state's congress overwhelmingly approved the measure more than two years following the supreme court decision.

On 3 February 2017 the SCJN emitted tesis 08/2017 in which it is stated that the family of the LGBTQ community doesn't end with a couple, but that it also extends onto the right to have and raise children. Therefore, LGBTQ couples wishing to form a family and adopt children will be legally protected and can't be limited by any governmental entity.

In October 2021, a bill was introduced to the legislature of Baja California Sur.

In September 2022, a bill was passed in Quintana Roo.

==== United States ====
In 1979, Reverend John Kuiper of the Metropolitan Community Church and his husband became the first gay men in America to win the right to adopt a child. Adoption by LGBTQ individuals or same-sex couples is legal in all fifty states as of June 2017.

According to U.S. census data, 54% of children adopted by gay male couples were boys. Among female couples, 56% were girls.

==== Uruguay ====
A government-sponsored adoption law in Uruguay allowing LGBTQ adoption was approved by the lower house on 28 August 2009, and by the Senate on 9 September 2009. In October 2009, the law was signed by President and took effect. According to Equipos Mori Poll's, 53% of Uruguayans are opposed to same sex adoption against 39% that support it. Interconsult's Poll made in 2008 says that 49% are opposed to same sex adoption against 35% that support it.

=== Asia ===
Legal status of adoption by same-sex couples in part of West Asia and in Egypt: Gay adoption legal Same-sex sexual activity illegal Neither/unknown/ambiguous

LGBTQ rights for adoption of children in Asia are almost nonexistent, except in Israel, Thailand, and Taiwan. While some Asian countries allow individual LGBTQ individuals to petition to adopt, the majority of them have no laws for petitioning as same-sex couples, or rights for a same-sex partner to petition for adoption of their partner's child.

The issue of same-sex adoption has been the subject of a long-running political and legal battle in Israel that was resolved in December 2023, when the Israeli Supreme Court interpreted existing law to allow same-sex adoptions, as the law gives absolute priority to the welfare of the child and not to the gender of its parents.

==== Taiwan ====
Until 2023, members of same-sex couples could only adopt the biological child of their spouse (so-called stepchild adoptions). Taiwan law allowed for opposite-sex married people to jointly adopt, and also allowed single individuals to adopt, depending on the circumstances, including individual LGBTQ people. The same-sex marriage law only granted same-sex couples the right to adopt children genetically related to one of the spouses.

=== Europe ===
Legal status of adoption by same-sex couples in Europe: Joint adoption legal Stepparent adoption legal No laws allowing adoption by same-sex couples

In February 2006, France's Court of Cassation ruled that both partners in a same-sex relationship can have parental rights over one partner's biological child. The result came from a case where a woman tried to give parental rights of her two daughters to her partner, with whom she was in a civil union. In the case of adoption, however, in February 2007, the same court ruled against a lesbian couple where one partner tried to adopt the child of the other partner. The court stated that the woman's partner cannot be recognized unless the mother withdrew her own parental rights. On 17 May 2013, French President François Hollande signed into law the bill that opened marriage and adoption rights linked to it for same sex couples.

In 1998, a nursery school teacher from Lons-le-Saunier, living as a couple with another woman, had applied for an authorization to adopt a child from the département (local government) of Jura. The adoption board recommended against the authorization because the child would lack a paternal reference, and thus the president of the département ruled against the authorization. The case was appealed before the administrative courts and ended before the Council of State, acting as supreme administrative court, which ruled against the woman. The European Court of Human Rights concluded that these actions and this ruling were a violation of Article 14 of the European Convention on Human Rights taken in conjunction with Article 8.

On 2 June 2006, the Icelandic Parliament unanimously passed a proposal accepting adoption, parenting and assisted insemination treatment for same-sex couples on the same basis as heterosexual couples. The law went into effect on 27 June 2006.

In Bulgaria, according to the Ministry of Justice the laws regarding adoption "lack a norm, concerning the sexual orientation of the individuals". Therefore, a single gay person or same-sex couples may adopt.

On 17 May 2013, the Portuguese parliament approved a bill in first reading allowing "co-adoption" of the biological or adopted child of the same-sex spouse or partner, where that spouse or partner is the only legally recognized parent of the child (e.g. the mother with the natural father not being registered). However, in October 2013 members of parliament opposed to the bill proposed a referendum on the issue and killed a motion to have the second vote in the plenary; the motion on the possible referendum was then considered, but the Constitutional Court declared it unconstitutional. On 14 March 2014, the original bill was rejected in second reading. On 20 November 2015, 5 proposals from several left-wing parties were voted favourably by the new parliament as result of 4 October General Elections.

In July 2014 through Life Partnership Act Croatia recognized an institution similar to step-child adoption called partner-guardian. A partner who is not a biological parent of a child can share parental responsibilities with a biological parent or parents if they agree to it, or if the court decides it is in the best interest of a child. Additionally, a biological parent or parents can temporarily give a partner who is not a biological parent full parental responsibilities. A partner who is not a biological parent can also gain permanent parental responsibilities through an institution of partner-guardian if both biological parents of a child have died, or exceptionally if a second biological parent of a child is unknown, and if the court decides it is in the best interest of a child.

In January 2015, the Constitutional Court of Austria found the existing laws on adoption to be unconstitutional and ordered the laws to be changed by 31 December 2015 to allow joint adoption by same-sex couples in Austria.

On 6 April 2015, the Children and Family Relationships Bill 2015 passed by Parliament in March 2015 which extends full adoption rights to cohabiting couples and those in civil partnerships was promulgated by the President of Ireland. The law went into effect a year later on 6 April 2016.

On 20 November 2015 the Portuguese Parliament approved; by 141 votes against 87 with 2 abstentions; a diploma presented by all the parties (except the right-wing PàF) to allow same-sex adoption. On 26 January 2016, the conservative Portuguese President Aníbal Cavaco Silva vetoed the bill and a week later the Portuguese Parliament overridden the veto. The law went into effect on 1 March 2016.

On 22 June 2016 the Italian Supreme Court of Cassation upheld a lower court's decision to approve a request for a lesbian to adopt her partner's daughter. Prosecutors had appealed against the decision by the Rome court of appeal. Decisions by the supreme court set a precedent.

In December 2020, Hungary explicitly legally banned adoption for same-sex couples within its constitution.

In April 2021, a court in Croatia ruled that same-sex partners have the right to adopt children. In May 2022, the High Administrative Court affirmed the ruling and rejected the appeal of the responsible Ministry.

In June 2022, the Constitutional Court of Slovenia ruled that same-sex partners have the right to jointly adopt. On 4 October 2022, the National Assembly (lower chamber of Slovenian parliament) passed the relevant act implementing this judgement, but a week later, the act was vetoed by the National Council (upper chamber of the parliament). This is to be followed by another vote on the act in the National Assembly and potentially a national referendum.

Estonia and Greece since 2024, allows full-joint adoption of children by same-sex couples – along with same-sex marriage being legalized at the same time.

On 1 January 2025, the Czech Republic will allow same-sex couples "partial adoption" of their own biological child or children – but not full joint adoption.

On 12 November 2026, the Constitutional Court of Italy ruled that civil union same-sex partners have the right to jointly adopt an adult (ruling 195/2026). It's the first time that Italy has recognized joint adoption for same sex couples, even though the adoption of minors is not still recognized.

=== Oceania ===
==== Australia ====
In Australia, same-sex adoption is legal in all states and territories since April 2018.

==== New Zealand ====
The Marriage (Definition of Marriage) Amendment Act 2013, which came into force on 19 August 2013, allowed same-sex marriage and permitted married same-sex couples to jointly adopt children. Previously, an LGBTQ individual was able to adopt children, but same-sex couples could not adopt jointly.

Currently, there are no specific barriers preventing an LGBTQ individual from adopting children, except that male individuals cannot adopt a female child. Same-sex marriage law became effective from 19 August 2013, and since then married same-sex couples were able to adopt children jointly. Unmarried couples of any sex and couples in a civil union can now jointly adopt children, under a New Zealand High Court ruling in December 2015. The ban breached the New Zealand Bill of Rights Act 1990. The minimum age to adopt in New Zealand is 20 years for a related child, and 25 years or the child's age plus 20 years (whichever is greater) for an unrelated child.

== Summary of laws by jurisdiction ==
Asia
Country	LGBTQ individual may petition to adopt	Same-sex couple may jointly petition	Same-sex partner may petition to adopt partner's child	Same-sex couples are allowed to foster or stepchild foster
Afghanistan	No	No	No	No
Armenia	No	No	No	No
Azerbaijan	Yes	No	No	No
Bahrain	No	No	No	No
Bangladesh	No	No	No	No
Bhutan	No	No	No	No
Brunei	No	No	No	No
Cambodia	Yes	No	No	No
China	No	No	No	No
Chinese Taipei	Yes	Yes	Yes	Yes
East Timor	No	No	No	No
Hong Kong	Yes	No	No	Yes
India	Yes	No	No	No
Indonesia	No	No	No	No
Iran	No	No	No	No
Iraq	No	No	No	No
Israel	Yes	Yes	Yes	Yes
Japan	Yes	No	Yes (some prefectures)	Yes (some prefectures)
Kazakhstan	No	No	No	No
Kyrgyzstan	No	No	No	No
Kuwait	No	No	No	No
Laos	No	No	No	No
Lebanon	No	No	No	No
Macau	No	No	No	No
Malaysia	Yes	No	No	No
Mongolia	No	No	No	No
Myanmar	No	No	No	No
Nepal	No	No	No	No
North Korea	No	No	No	No
Oman	No	No	No	No
Pakistan	No	No	No	No
Palestine	No	No	No	No
Philippines	Yes	No	No	No
Qatar	No	No	No	No
Saudi Arabia	No	No	No	No
Singapore	Yes	No	No	No
South Korea	No	No	No	No
Sri Lanka	No	No	No	No
Syria	No	No	No	No
Tajikistan	No	No	No	No
Thailand (Note: Same-sex marriage legal)	Yes	Yes	Yes	Yes
Turkey	Yes	No	No	No
Turkmenistan	No	No	No	No
United Arab Emirates	No	No	No	No
Uzbekistan	No	No	No	No
Yemen	No	No	No	No
Vietnam	Yes	No	No	No

Europe
Country	LGBTQ individual may petition to adopt	Same-sex couple may jointly petition	Same-sex partner may petition to adopt partner's child	Same-sex couples are allowed to foster or stepchild foster
Albania	Yes	No	No	No
Andorra (Note: Same-sex marriage legal)	Yes	Yes	Yes	Yes
Austria	Yes	Yes	Yes	Yes (Note: except state of Lower Austria)
Belgium	Yes	Yes	Yes	Yes
Belarus	No	No	No	No
Bosnia and Herzegovina	Yes	No	No	No
Bulgaria	Yes	No	No	No
Croatia	Yes	Yes (Note: by a final court ruling)	Yes	Yes
Czech Republic	Yes	No	Yes	Yes
Cyprus	Yes	No	No	No
Denmark	Yes	Yes	Yes	Yes
Estonia	Yes	Yes	Yes	Yes
Faroe Islands	Yes	Yes	Yes	Yes
Finland	Yes	Yes	Yes	Yes
France	Yes	Yes	Yes	Yes
Georgia	No	No (explicit ban)	No (explicit ban)	No (explicit ban)
Germany	Yes	Yes	Yes	Yes
Gibraltar	Yes	Yes	Yes	Yes
Greece	Yes	Yes	Yes	Yes
Guernsey	Yes	Yes	Yes	Yes
Hungary	No	No (constitutional ban)	No (constitutional ban)	No (constitutional ban)
Iceland	Yes	Yes	Yes	Yes
Ireland	Yes	Yes	Yes	Yes
Isle of Man	Yes	Yes	Yes	Yes
Italy	No (Note: single people may adopt only in exceptional circumstances, independently of their sexual orientation)	No	Yes	Yes
Jersey	Yes	Yes	Yes	Yes
Kosovo	Yes	No	No	No
Latvia	Yes	No	No	No
Liechtenstein	Yes	Yes	Yes	Yes
Lithuania	No	No	No	No
Luxembourg	Yes	Yes	Yes	Yes
Malta	Yes	Yes	Yes	Yes
Moldova	No	No	No	No
Monaco	No	No	No	No
Montenegro	Yes	No	No	No
Netherlands	Yes	Yes	Yes	Yes
North Macedonia	Yes	No	No	No
Northern Cyprus	Yes	No	No	No
Norway	Yes	Yes	Yes	Yes
Poland	Yes	No	No	No
Portugal	Yes	Yes	Yes	Yes
Romania	No	No	No	No
Russia	No	No (constitutional ban)	No (constitutional ban)	No (constitutional ban)
San Marino	Yes	No	Yes	No
Serbia	Yes	No	No	No
Slovakia	Yes	No	No	No
Slovenia	Yes	Yes	Yes	Yes
Spain	Yes	Yes	Yes	Yes
Sweden	Yes	Yes	Yes	Yes
Switzerland	Yes	Yes	Yes	Yes
Ukraine	Yes	No	No	No
United Kingdom	Yes	Yes	Yes	Yes

The Americas
Country	LGBTQ individual may petition to adopt	Same-sex couple may jointly petition	Same-sex partner may petition to adopt partner's child	Same-sex couples are allowed to foster or stepchild foster
Anguilla	No	No	No	No
Antigua and Barbuda	No	No	No	No
Argentina (Note: Same-sex marriage legal)	Yes	Yes	Yes	Yes
Aruba	No	No	No	No
Bahamas	No	No	No	No
Barbados	No	No	No	No
Bonaire	Yes	Yes	Yes	Yes
Belize	No	No	No	No
Bermuda	Yes	Yes	Yes	Yes
Bolivia	Yes	No	No	No
Brazil	Yes	Yes	Yes	Yes
British Virgin Islands	No	No	No	No
Canada	Yes	Yes	Yes	Yes
Cayman Islands	No	No	No	No
Chile	Yes	Yes	Yes	Yes
Colombia	Yes	Yes	Yes	Yes
Costa Rica	Yes	Yes	Yes	Yes
Cuba	Yes	Yes	Yes	Yes
Curaçao	No	No	No	No
Dominica	No	No	No	No
Dominican Republic	No	No	No	No
Ecuador	Yes	No (constitutional ban	No (constitutional ban)	Yes
El Salvador	No	No	No	No
Falkland Islands	Yes	Yes	Yes	Yes
French Guiana	Yes	Yes	Yes	Yes
Greenland	Yes	Yes	Yes	Yes
Grenada	No	No	No	No
Guadeloupe	Yes	Yes	Yes	Yes
Guatemala	No	No	No	No
Guyana	No	No	No	No
Haiti	No	No	No	No
Honduras	No	No (constitutional ban)	No (constitutional ban)	No
Jamaica	No	No	No	No
Martinique	Yes	Yes	Yes	Yes
Mexico	Yes	Yes (some states)	Yes (some states)	Yes
Montserrat	No	No	No	No
Nicaragua	No	No	No	No
Paraguay	Yes	No	No	No
Peru	No	No	No	No
Puerto Rico	Yes	Yes	Yes	Yes
Saba	Yes	Yes	Yes	Yes
Saint Barthélemy	Yes	Yes	Yes	Yes
Saint Kitts and Nevis	No	No	No	No
Saint Lucia	No	No	No	No
Saint Martin	No	No	No	No
Saint Pierre and Miquelon	Yes	Yes	Yes	Yes
Saint Vincent and the Grenadines	No	No	No	No
Sint Eustatius	Yes	Yes	Yes	Yes
Sint Maarten	No	No	No	No
Suriname	No	No	No	No
Turks and Caicos Islands	No	No	No	No
Trinidad and Tobago	No	No	No	No
United States	Yes	Yes	Yes	Yes
United States Virgin Islands	No	No	No	No
Uruguay	Yes	Yes	Yes	Yes
Venezuela	No	No	No	No

== See also ==
- Same-sex marriage
- Civil union
- LGBTQ rights
- Heterosexism
- Adoption proceedings of Emma Rose
- Mommy Mommy, a 2007 documentary about a lesbian adoptive couple
- Preacher's Sons, a 2008 documentary about a gay adoptive couple
- Catholic Charities USA § Controversies
- Same-sex adult adoption
