= Nanjing 1937 =

Nanjing 1937 may refer to:

- Don't Cry, Nanking, also known as Nanjing 1937, 1995 film by Wu Ziniu
- Nanjing 1937: A Love Story, 1996 Chinese novel by Ye Zhaoyan

== See also ==
- Battle of Nanking (1937)
- Nanjing Massacre (1937–1938)
