= Kill the chicken to scare the monkey =

Making an example out of someone in order to threaten others

Kill the chicken to scare the monkey (traditional Chinese: 殺雞儆猴; simplified Chinese: 杀鸡儆猴; pinyin: Shājījǐnghóu; Wade–Giles: Sha-chi-ching-hou, lit. kill chicken scare monkey) is an old Chinese idiom. It refers to making an example out of someone in order to threaten others.

According to an old folktale, a street entertainer earned a lot of money with his dancing monkey. One day, when the monkey refused to dance, the entertainer killed a live chicken in front of the monkey, and then the monkey resumed dancing.

A historical anecdote relates that, at the beginning of the Zhou dynasty (11th -3rd century BCE), Jiang Ziya was asked by his king to find him an advisor. Jiang Ziya asked a scholar who lived on a mountaintop. After the scholar refused multiple times, Jiang Ziya killed the scholar, knowing that the next scholar he asked to join the kingdom would fear the same fate, and thereby would accept the invitation.

== In popular culture ==
In the 2007 American Film: Balls of Fury, Christopher Walker as Feng delivers this idiom in phonetic Mandarin twice, officially subtitled as "Let that be a lesson to you."

== See also ==
- Killing the Chickens, to Scare the Monkeys, a 2011 short film
- Pour encourager les autres, an expression used by Voltaire to refer to the execution of British admiral John Byng for perceived failings at the Battle of Minorca
