= Céline Curiol =

French journalist and writer

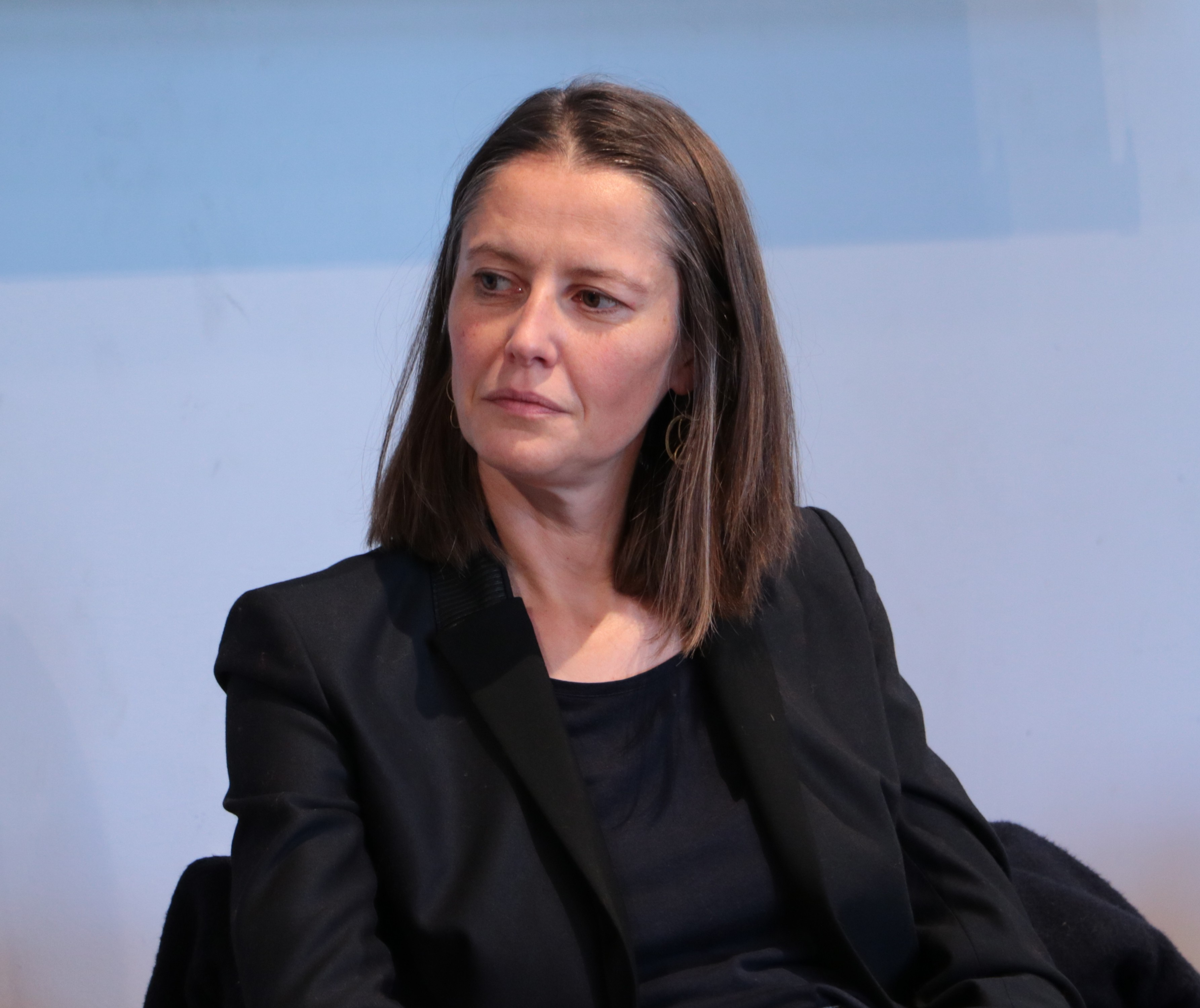
Céline Curiol (2022)

Céline Curiol (born 1975) is a French journalist and writer.

== Biography ==
She was born in Lyon and was educated at the École supérieure des techniques avancées and the Sorbonne. Curiol moved to New York City where she was a correspondent for the BBC, Radio France and Libération. In 2005, she published her first novel, Voix sans issue (Voice over), which was translated into 15 languages. It was a winner of the French Voices Award, and a finalist for the Best Translated Book Award and the Independent Foreign Fiction Prize in 2009.

In 2008, Curiol was a resident of the prestigious Villa Kujoyama in Kyoto. She has also lived in London and Buenos Aires.

Since then, she has published a dozen novels and essays, including an acclaimed memoire on depression, Un Quinze août à Paris, and an ambitious novel of multiple voices, taking place during 2015 in Paris and questioning revolutionary potentials in contemporary western societies.

She currently teaches creative writing, media and communication at Sciences Po, Telecom ParisTech and ENSTA in Paris.

== Selected works ==
- Permission, novel (2007)
- Route rouge, travelogue (2007)
- Voice Over, novel, translated by Sam Richard (2008)
- Exil intermédiaire, novel (2009)
- L'ardeur des pierres, novel (2012)
- A vue de nez, essay (2013)
- Un Quinze août à Paris, essay (2014)
- Les Vieux ne pleurent jamais, novel (2016)
- La posture du pêcheur, novella (2021)
- Les Lois de l'ascension, novel (2021)
