= Cemalnur Sargut =

Turkish Sufi leader and Islamic scholar (born 1952)

Personal life
- Born: 3 November 1953 (age 72) Istanbul, Turkey
- Parents: Ömer Faruk Sargut (father); Meşkûre Sargut (mother)
- Main interest(s): Islamic philosophy, Sufism

Religious life
- Religion: Islam
- Denomination: Sunni
- Jurisprudence: Hanafi
- Tariqa: Rifaʽi
- Creed: Maturidi

Muslim leader
- Teacher: Samiha Ayverdi
- Influenced by: Rumi, Haji Bektash Veli, Shams Tabrizi
- Website: cemalnur.org

Cemalnur Sargut (born November 3, 1952) is a Turkish Sufi, a leader of the Rifa'i order, author, and Islamic scholar.

== Biography ==
Cemalnur Sargut was born to Meskure Sargut and Omer Faruk Sargut on November 3, 1952 in Istanbul. Sargut's mother was a disciple of Turkish Sufi master Ken'an Rifa'i. She attended Kadikoy High School for Girls and studied chemical engineering at the National Academy of Architecture and Engineering in Istanbul. As a young woman, Sargut was a student of Sufi mystic and writer Samiha Ayverdi. She worked as a chemistry teacher for twenty years.

Sargut is a scholar of Ken'an Rifa'i, although she never met him in person. She has studied the works of Ibn 'Arabi, Misri Niyazi, Abu Bakr al-Shibli, Sadr al-Din al-Qunawi, Abd al-Karim al-Jili, Ahmad al-Rifaʽi, and Rumi. Sargut is active as a religious leader appearing on television and giving sermons aired on Turkish radio. Her discourses were compiled by her students and published as Dinle (Listen) by Nefes Press in 2012. This work was translated into English and published by Fons Vitae as Beauty and Light: Mystical Discourses by a Contemporary Female Sufi Master.

Sargut is the leader of the Istanbul branch of the Turkish Women's Cultural Association (TÜRKKAD) which promotes Turkish culture, traditional Turkish artforms, and provides education for low-income students. TÜRKKAD was founded by Samiha Ayyverdi in 1966 during a revival of NGOs resulting from the state's repression of Islamic organizations, schools, and Sufi lodges. Turkey banned Sufi orders and practices in 1925 under Kemalist ideology, forcing Sufis to operate covertly.

Sargut is the author of over a dozen books about Islam and Sufism. Sargut and her organization endowed the Kenan Rifai Distinguished Professorship of Islamic Studies at the University of North Carolina in 2009. They have also endowed a chair at Peking University in Beijing, China. They helped establish the Kenan Rifa'i Center for Sufi Studies at Kyoto University.

== Works ==
- Mülk Suresi
- Allah'ıma Sefere Çıktım
- Kenan Rifâî ile Aşka Yolculuk
- Dinle
- Aşktan Dinle
- Ey İnsan (Yasîn Sûresi Şerhi)
- Bakara (Bakara Sûresi ilk 10 Ayetin Şerhi)
- Bakara II (Bakara Sûresi 11-29 arasındaki Ayetlerin Şerhi)
- Bakara III (İnsan-ı Kamil'in Hakikati)
- Hz. Âdem (Füsusu’l Hikem Şerhi)
- Hz. Şit (Füsusu’l Hikem Şerhi)
- Hz. Nuh (Füsusu’l Hikem Şerhi)
- Hz. İdris (Füsusu’l Hikem Şerhi)
- Sâmiha Ayverdi ile Sırra Yolculuk
- Peygambere Sevdirilen Kadın
- Kâbe’nin Hakîkati
- Osmanlı Padişahlarında Peygamber Sevgisi
- Can-ı Candır Hz. Ahmed Muhammed Mustafa
- Hz. Meryem - Yaratılış Sırrı (Meryem Sûresi 1-15 arasındaki Ayetlerin Şerhi)
- Sohbetler
- Ayetü'l Kürsi
- Peygamber Sevgisi
- Yaratılış Sırrı

=== Works in English ===
- Beauty and Light: Mystical Discourses by a Contemporary Female Sufi Master, translated by Canguzel Zulfikar, Omer Colakaglu and Nazli Kayahan, edited by Tehseen Thaver
- O Humankind: Surah Ya-Sin, translated by Victoria Rowe Holbrook
