= Killing the Chickens, to Scare the Monkeys =

- Directed by: Jens Assur
- Written by: Jens Assur
- Produced by: Studio Jens Assur
- Cinematography: Marek Weiser
- Edited by: Fredrik Morheden; Åsa Mossberg
- Release date: 2011
- Running time: 23 minutes
- Countries: Sweden; Thailand
- Language: Mandarin Chinese with English subtitles

Killing the Chickens, to Scare the Monkeys is a 2011 short film directed by Jens Assur. Set in the People's Republic of China, it unfolds through nine scenes that illustrate the unforeseen consequences of national politics and strategy on a young teacher's life. Notably, the film's first scene is a 15-minute single take, without any cuts.

Shot in Sweden and Thailand, this was Assur's second short film as both a director and writer.

== Background ==
The idea for the movie is based on a photograph, smuggled out of China, depicting a group of prisoners kneeling, awaiting their execution. Around the group, people can be seen chatting and even laughing.

== Title ==
The title paraphrases an old Chinese idiom "kill the chicken to scare the monkey" (杀鸡儆猴, lit. kill chicken scare monkey), which refers to making an example out of someone in order to threaten others, in the manner of pour encourager les autres. The movie implies that the Chinese government policy of executing dissidents is meant to deter others.

== Festivals and awards ==
Directors' Fortnight Cannes, France May 2011

Nordisk Panorama Århus, Denmark
Winner Best Short
September 2011

Festival de Cine de Alcalá de Henares Madrid, Spain
Special Jury Mention: Alcine
November 2011

Vendôme Film Festival Vendome, France
Winner
December 2011

Prague Short Film Festival 2012 Prague, Czech Republic
Special Jury Mention

Clermont-Ferrand 2012 Clermont-Ferrand, France
Special Jury Mention

Minimalen Short Film Festival 2012 Trondheim, Norway
Best Film - Nordic Competition
Best Fiction - Nordic Competition
