= Victoria Holbrook =

American scholar and translator

Victoria Rowe Holbrook is an American scholar and translator of Turkish literature and language. She studied at Harvard and Princeton, obtaining a PhD from the latter in 1985. Her subject was Near Eastern Studies. She won numerous fellowships and research grants in her academic career. She was attached to Ohio State University from 1987 to 2005, also teaching at Bilkent University, Koç University, and Boğaziçi University in Turkey.

Her book, The Unreadable Shores of Love: Turkish Modernity and Mystic Romance, won the Turkish Studies Association M. Fuat Köprülü Book Prize.

She is best known today for her translation of Orhan Pamuk's novel The White Castle, which won the inaugural Independent Foreign Fiction Prize. Other translations include:

- Beauty And Love by Seyh Galip (2 vols.)
- East West Mimesis: Auerbach in Turkey by Kader Konuk
- The Other by Ece Vahapoglu
- The New Cultural Climate in Turkey: Living in a Shop Window by Nurdan Gurbilek
- Listen: Commentary on the Spiritual Couplets of Mevlana Rumi by Kenan Rifai
- O Humankind: Surah Ya-Sin by Cemalnur Sargut (trans. Victoria Rowe Holbrook) (Nefes/Fons Vitae: Istanbul; 2021)
