= Omega Minor =

Book by Paul Verhaeghen

- Author: Paul Verhaeghen
- Translator: Paul Verhaeghen
- Language: Dutch
- Publisher: J.M. Meulenhoff
- Publication date: 2004
- Publication place: Belgium
- English publication date: 2007
- Pages: 614
- ISBN: 9789059900127

Omega Minor is a 2004 novel by the Belgian writer Paul Verhaeghen. The narrative follows a number of European research students and their theories about the Omega density parameter and the nature of dark matter, as well as ponders on the violence of World War II. The book received the Ferdinand Bordewijk Prize in 2005 and the Independent Foreign Fiction Prize in 2008.

== Reception ==
Matt Thorne reviewed the book for The Independent: "Among authors of big novels that address science, technology and psychology, Verhaeghen is closer to William T Vollmann, Don DeLillo and the underrated British author James Flint than Thomas Pynchon or David Foster Wallace. He has almost no interest in popular culture and his conspiracy theories tend to focus on historical injustice rather than sinister cabals. Although it is always entertaining, and rarely heavy going, there is nothing whimsical about this book." Thorne continued: "Omega Minor is undoubtedly a curate's egg, but few recent novels rival its richness. And there is something admirable about an author who challenges not just the structural limitations of the novel, but also the limitations of our understanding of the universe. For all its flaws, this is an uncommonly intellectually stretching -- and satisfying -- experience."

== See also ==
- 2004 in literature
- Belgian literature
