= Jens Assur =

Swedish photographer and film director (born 1970)

Jens Assur (born April 29, 1970) is a Swedish photographer, director, scriptwriter, and film producer.

His movie, Killing the Chickens, to Scare the Monkeys, premiered at the Cannes Film Festival in 2011 and has since won a number of prizes.

At the Sundance Film Festival in 2012, Assur was given the Sundance/NHK International Filmmakers Award for his movies, The Last Dog in Rwanda, and Killing the Chickens, to Scare the Monkeys, and for the script for his first feature film Close Far Away.

== Early career ==
Assur started his career at Dagbladet in Sundsvall, as a reporter and photographer, 1986–1990. Between 1990 and 1997 he was employed as a staff photographer at Expressen, a daily newspaper in Scandinavia. He produced several photo essays from Somalia, Rwanda, South Africa and the former Yugoslavia amongst other countries earning a Photographer of the year award at the age of 23. In 1997 Assur left Expressen to start his company Studio Jens Assur and worked on art and film projects.

During the 1990s Assur depicted developing countries, but in recent years he has switched focus to the industrialized parts of the world. Examples of these are his works This is My Time, This is My Life, Hunger and Thailand – A Charter Paradise.

In addition to his art and film projects, Assur lectures and is featured on news programmes, television shows and in magazines.

== Photography ==
Under the Shifting Skies/Och himlen därovan (1997–2001) comprises two books of 256 pages each and a travelling exhibition with 70 photographic images blown up to 1.5 x 2 meters. The exhibition was itinerant and attracted an attendance of 80,000 at its opening at Arbetets museum in Norrköping.

In 1999 Assur's work was featured in an edition of Life magazine devoted to the Olympic Games in Sydney.

This is My Time, This is My Life (2003–2006) depicts Stockholm youth via Polaroid instant images. The exhibition was launched at the Moderna Museet in Stockholm, 2006.

In 2006, Assur worked for the Swedish Red Cross on its marketing campaign, Victims of War. The project portrays the daily lives of victims of war in Sudan and Democratic Republic of Congo and included a fundraising drive.

I Can See the World From Here (2007) is based on photos taken with a pocket camera, and was exhibited at Färgfabriken in Stockholm.

Hunger (2009–2010) comprised five photography books which were sent to influential public opinion makers ahead of the Swedish general election in 2010, stirring debate in the media. The project culminated in an exhibition at Kulturhuset in Stockholm.

Thailand – A Charter Paradise (2011) is an Artist's book consisting of handmade photo albums, produced in an edition of 250, focusing on Swedes' travels to Thailand.

For Black Box (2012) Assur created a photo-series called "Supermegacities", which shows the effect of migration in the most influential cities. Each image is cut into 12 individual tiles. In each Black Box a random selection of these tiles will allow the receiver to create their own work of art consisting of different pieces of the global metropolises. By allowing the spectator to become an active participant and creator, Studio Assur brings to life not only its own view of the global culture but also that of every unique individual who is a part of it. To extend the interaction further a website is available where people can connect with other Black Box owners. There they can swap their tiles to collect their favourite image or post their own abstract art pieces created from the contents of the Black Box.

With a goal to challenge the image of Africa that dominates media, Assur visited 12 African metropolitans for Africa is a Great Country (2013), so as to give a different perspective. An image of the African continent that is moving forward and developing at record speed with several countries topping the lists of the world's fastest growing. Through 40 super sized images (2.5 x 3.5 meter) Assur depicts the hyper urbanisation; a raising middle class; and the architecture, infrastructure and development of some of the largest metropolitan areas. Assur uses the large format camera's precision and scope to draw the audience into the images. Africa is a Great Country was shown at Liljevalchs in Stockholm in 2013 and toured Sweden and Africa during 2013/15.

== Films ==
The Last Dog in Rwanda (2006) was Assur's writing and directing debut portraying the Rwandan genocide of 1994, the short film was shot in South Africa and Sweden. Swedish actors Reine Brynolfsson and Jonas Karlsson played the main characters. Drawing from Assur's experiences as a war photographer, the film won the Grand Prix at Clermont Ferrand and Best Film at Tribeca Film Festival, as well as prizes at film festivals in Sydney and Rome.

Killing the Chickens, to Scare the Monkeys (2011) is a short film set in the People's Republic of China. The film was one of 25 films featured at the 2011 Cannes film festival in the Director's Fortnight category.

== Publications ==
- Under the Shifting Skies/Och himlen därovan (2001)
- Hunger (2010)
- Thailand – A Charter Paradise (2011)
- Africa is a Great Country (2013)

== Filmography ==
- The Last Dog in Rwanda (2006) – director and screenwriter; short film
- Killing the Chickens, to Scare the Monkeys (2011) – director and screenwriter; short film
- A Society (2012) – director and screenwriter; short film
- Hot Nasty Teen (2014) – director and screenwriter; short film
- Ravens (2017)
