= Brodeck's Report =

2007 novel by Philippe Claudel

- Author: Philippe Claudel
- Original title: Le Rapport de Brodeck
- Translator: John Cullen
- Language: French
- Publisher: Stock
- Publication date: 2007
- Publication place: France
- English publication date: 2010
- Pages: 416
- ISBN: 9782234057739

Brodeck's Report (French: Le Rapport de Brodeck) is a 2007 novel by the French writer Philippe Claudel. The narrative investigates the murder of a mysterious man in an indefinite country just after the war. The book won the Prix Goncourt des Lycéens and the Independent Foreign Fiction Prize. The location and the time are never explicit in the novel. However the parallel with World War II is obvious.

== Reception ==
Helen Brown of The Daily Telegraph called the novel "deeply wise and classically beautiful". Brown wrote: "Brodeck's Report won the Prix Goncourt des Lycéens in the original French and John Cullen's English translation is as clear as a mountain stream. It is a modern masterpiece." Globally, Complete Review saying on the consensus "Almost all very impressed".

== In other media ==
Manu Larcenet adapted it as a graphic novel of the same name in 2015.

== See also ==
- 2007 in literature
- French literature
