= Vangelis Hatziyannidis =

Greek novelist and playwright (born 1967)

Vangelis Hatziyannidis (Greek: Βαγγέλης Χατζηγιαννίδης; born 1967) is a Greek novelist and playwright.

He was born in Serres in northern Greece. A graduate of the University of Athens, he went to acting school and worked as an actor for a number of years before turning to writing plays. He has written half a dozen plays. He made his debut as a novelist with Four Walls (2001), which has since been translated into all the major European languages. The French edition of Four Walls won the Laure Bataillon Prize for best translated book, while the English version was nominated for the Independent Foreign Fiction Prize.

His next book to be translated into English is Stolen Time. The translator for both Four Walls and Stolen Time is Anne-Marie Stanton-Ife.
