= The Last Dog in Rwanda =

- Directed by: Jens Assur
- Written by: Jens Assur
- Produced by: Daniel Hill; Anna Carlsten
- Cinematography: Marek Weiser
- Release date: 2006
- Running time: 29 minutes
- Countries: Sweden; South Africa
- Languages: Swedish; English

The Last Dog in Rwanda is a Swedish short narrative film from 2006 directed and written by Jens Assur. It was Assur's debut both as a writer and a director.

== Festivals and awards ==
Tribeca Film Festival, USA
Best Short Narrative
2007
