= Samiha Ayverdi =

Turkish writer (1905–1993)

- Born: 25 November 1905; Istanbul, Ottoman Empire
- Died: 22 March 1993 (aged 87); Istanbul, Turkey
- Resting place: Merkezefendi Cemetery, Istanbul
- Occupation: Novelist
- Relatives: Ekrem Hakkı Ayverdi (brother)

Samiha Ayverdi (25 November 1905 – 22 March 1993) was a Turkish writer.

== Biography ==
Samiha Ayverdi was born in İstanbul to Fatma Meliha Hanim and İsmail Hakkı Bey, an Ottoman military official. She studied at Süleymaniye Kız Numune Mektebi and among other things, learned French and read about philosophy and Islamic mysticism. She became a follower and later official successor of Sufi thinker Kenan Rıfai, who became a major influence in her work. She was the sister of architect and historian Ekrem Hakkı Ayverdi.

In 1938, she published her first novel titled Aşk Budur and followed it with over 30 novels and short story collections.

Ayverdi died on 22 March 1993 and is buried at the Merkezefendi Cemetery in Zeytinburnu, İstanbul.

== Works ==
Samiha Ayverdi published her first novel Aşk Budur in 1938. Since 1946, she focused more on ideas and historical works. She used history extensively in her works. Her reviews and novels are on Istanbul. Sufi thought and history were especially revived in her novels, and she tried to introduce Kenan Rifai to the readers through her works.

Her novels "The Unsinkable Day" and "Man and the Devil" are the products of her search for the past. Her novel that best reflects her longing for the past is İbrahim Efendi Mansion, which is also included in the list of 100 Essential Works. The number of books published by Kubbealtı Publications under the name of Samiha Ayverdi Collection is 47.

== Bibliography ==
- Aşk Budur (Aşk Bu imiş) 1938
- Batmayan Gün 1939
- Mâbette Bir Gece 1940
- Ateş Ağacı 1941
- Yaşayan Ölü 1942
- İnsan ve Şeytan 1942
- Son Menzil 1943
- Yolcu Nereye Gidiyorsun 1944
- Yusufcuk 1946
- Mesihpaşa İmamı 1948
- Ken'an Rifâî ve Yirminci Asrın Işığında Müslümanlık 1951
- İstanbul Geceleri 1952
- Edebî ve Mânevî Dünyâsı İçinde Fâtih 1953
- İbrâhim Efendi Konağı 1964
- Boğaziçi'nde Târih 1966
- Misyonerlik Karşısında Türkiye 1969
- Türk-Rus Münâsebetleri ve Muhârebeleri 1970
- Bir Dünyâdan Bir Dünyâya 1974
- Türk Târihinde Osmanlı Asırları 1975
- Millî Kültür Meseleleri ve Maârif Dâvâmız 1976
- Âbide Şahsiyetler 1976
- Türkiye'nin Ermeni Meselesi 1976
- Hâtıralarla Başbaşa 1977
- Kölelikten Efendiliğe 1978 (Arabic and English 1979, Urduca 1981)
- Dost 1980 (İngilizce 1995)
- Yeryüzünde Birkaç Adım 1984
- Rahmet Kapısı 1985
- Mektuplardan Gelen Ses 1985
- Ne İdik Ne Olduk 1986
- Hancı 1986
- Bağ Bozumu 1987
- Hey Gidi Günler Hey 1988
- Küplüce'deki Köşk 1989
- Ah Tuna Vah Tuna 1990
- Dile Gelen Taş 1999
- Râtibe 2000
- İki Âşinâ 2003
- Ezelî Dostlar 2004
- Mülâkatlar 2005
- Dünden Bugüne Ne Kalmıştır 2006
- Arkamızda Dönen Dolaplar 2007
- Kaybolan Anahtar 2008
- Paşa Hanım 2009
- Ebabil Kuşları 2010
- O da Bana Kalsın 2013
- Türkiye'nin Ermeni Meselesi 2014
- Sinan'ın Günlüğü 2015

== Prizes ==
In 1978, the Turkish National Culture Foundation Gift; Honorary Service to the Turkish National Culture, given by the National Culture Foundation in 1984; In 1985, dhe received the Boğaziçi Achievement Award from Boğaziçi Publishing for her work named Few Steps on Earth. On April 26, 1986, a plaque was presented to her by the Turkish Literature Foundation for her "Services to National Art." She was given the Language Award of the Year by the Writers Union of Turkey for her work titled "Hey Gidi Günler Hey" published in 1988. In 1990, the Prime Ministry family research institution presented her with a plaque of appreciation. In 1992, she received the Outstanding Service Award given by the Professional Association of Owners of Scientific and Literary Works of Turkey (İLESAM). The name of Vatan Anatolian High School, located on Vatan Caddesi in Istanbul, Fatih was changed in 2005 to Samiha Ayverdi Anatolian High School.

== See also ==
- Cemalnur Sargut
