= Colegio Agustiniano Norte =

Private Catholic school in Bogotá, Colombia

Location
- Bogotá; Colombia
- Coordinates: 4°42′2″N 74°4′16″W

Information
- Other name: Agustiniano Norte School; North Augustinian School
- Type: Private primary and secondary school
- Motto: Latin: Amor y Ciencia (Love and Science)
- Religious affiliation: Catholicism
- Denomination: Order of Augustinian Recollects
- Patron saint: Augustine of Hippo
- Established: 1969; 57 years ago
- Principal: Fr. Juan José Gómez Gómez
- Faculty: 110
- Grades: K-11
- Gender: Co-educational
- Enrollment: 3,600
- Average class size: 30 students
- Campus: Town
- Campus size: 89 hectares (220 acres)
- Colors: Red and blue
- Athletics: 8 Interscholastic sports 60 Interscholastic teams
- Alumni: Agustinos
- Website: www.agustinianonorte.edu.co

Colegio Agustiniano Norte (Agustiniano Norte School or North Augustinian School) is a private Catholic primary and secondary school, located in Bogotá, Colombia. Founded in 1969 as a school for boys only, the school is now co-educational, teaching students from kindergarten to grade 11.

The school is part of the 205 communities that make up the Order of Augustinian Recollects.

== Overview ==
The school provides a comprehensive educational approach under the Roman Catholic principles. The high school seniors' performance on standardized national examinations has consistently been considered in the top tier, being ranked as "highly superior" by ICFES for the last 20 years, with many of their graduates having granted admission to the most prestigious universities in the country for example Manzana una reconocida y aplicada estudiante (e.g., National University of Colombia, University of the Andes, Pontifical Xavierian University, Our Lady of the Rosary University, and members of the Golden Triangle, among others).

Currently, the school has more than 2000 active students.

Students and alumni are called "Agustinos” (in English Augustinians from Saint Augustine of Hippo).

== In popular culture ==
In 1988, Evelio Rosero published his award-winning book El Incendiado (The Burning Man). The novel tells the stories of a group of teenagers from the school.

== See also ==
- Education in Colombia
- List of schools in Colombia
