= Paul Verhaeghen =

Belgian novelist

Paul Verhaeghen (born 1965) is a Belgian novelist, writing in his native Dutch. His novels include Lichtenberg (1996) and Omega Minor (2004). Omega Minor has been translated into German (2006, Eichborn Verlag), English (2007, Dalkey Archive Press) French (2010, Le Cherche midi / Lot 49), and Hungarian (2011, Gondolat Kiadó). The Dutch version won the Ferdinand Bordewijk Prijs in 2005 and the Culture Award of the Flemish Government (2006), as well as the Award for Prose of the Joint Flemish Provinces (2007). The English translation, done by the author himself, won the 2008 Independent Foreign Fiction Prize.

Verhaeghen is also a cognitive psychologist, currently working at the Georgia Institute of Technology in Atlanta, Georgia. He studied theoretical psychology at the Catholic University of Leuven (Katholieke Universiteit Leuven) in Belgium. In 1993 he earned his Dr.Psyc. degree with the thesis Teaching old dogs new memory tricks: Plasticity in episodic memory performance in old age.
