= Evelio Rosero =

Colombian writer (born 1958)

Evelio Rosero Diago
- Born: 20 March 1958 (age 68); Bogotá, Colombia
- Occupations: Novelist and journalist
- Writing career
- Genre: Fiction

Evelio Rosero Diago (born 20 March 1958, in Bogotá, Colombia) is a Colombian writer and journalist, who won the 2006 Tusquets Prize. His works have been translated into a dozen European languages. Rosero currently lives in Bogotá.

== Education and career ==
Evelio Rosero attended primary school in Colombia's southern city of Pasto, and high school in Bogotá, where he later attended Universidad Externado de Colombia obtaining a degree in journalism. When he was 21, he won Colombia's Premio Nacional de Cuento del Quindío 1979 (National Short Story Award of Quindío), for his piece Ausentes (The Departed) that was published by Instituto Colombiano de Cultura in the book 17 Cuentos colombianos (17 Colombian Short Stories). In 1982, he was awarded with the Premio Iberoamericano de Libro de Cuentos Netzahualcóyotl, in Mexico City for his earlier stories, and that same year, a novella under the title Papá es santo y sabio (Dad is holy and wise) won Spain's Premio Internacional de Novela Breve Valencia. After these early successes, Rosero fled to Europe and lived first in Paris and later in Barcelona.

His first novel in 1984 was Mateo Solo (Mateo Alone), which began his trilogy known as Primera Vez (First Time). Mateo Solo is a story about a child confined in his own home. Mateo knows about the outside world for what he sees through the windows. It is a novel of dazzling confinement, where sight is the main character: his sister, his aunt, his nanny all play their own game while allowing Mateo to keep his hope for identity in plotting his own escape.

With his second book in 1986, Juliana los mira (Juliana is watching), Evelio Rosero was translated into Swedish, Norwegian, Danish and German to great acclaim. Once again, the visual experience of a child, this time a girl, builds the world of grownups and family, unveiling all the brutality and meanness of adults as seen with her ingenuousness. Juliana's world is her own house and family. As Juliana watches her parents and relatives, she builds them. Her sight alters objects as she contemplates them. This was the first book where Rosero involved other themes from Colombia's tragical reality, such as kidnapping, presented here as a permanent threat that in the end justifies Juliana's own confinement.

In 1988, El Incendiado (The Burning Man) was published. With this book, Rosero obtained a Proartes bachelor in Colombia and won in 1992 the II Premio Pedro Gómez Valderrama for the most outstanding book written between 1988 and 1992. The novel tells the stories of a group of teenagers from a famous school in Bogotá, Colegio Agustiniano Norte, denouncing the education taught by the priest headmasters as "fool, arcaic, troglodite and morbid".

To date, he has written nine novels, beginning with Señor que no conoce luna in 1992 and Cuchilla in 2000 which won a Norma-Fundalectura prize. Plutón (Pluto) published also in 2000, Los almuerzos (The lunches) in 2001, Juega el amor in 2002 and Los Ejércitos, which won in 2006 the prestigious 2nd Premio Tusquets Editores de Novela and also won in 2009 the prestigious Independent Foreign Fiction Prize organized by the British newspaper The Independent.

Evelio Rosero's motto could be 'a heart that feels, eyes that see'. He has explored in his oeuvre the hidden and alarming ways of life with their insanity and cruelties. New visions on good and evil, adolescence, love and vices and even the horror of Colombia's longtime war are some of the main topics in his books. His stories, sometimes filled with fantastic characters, are beautiful metaphors of humanity and man's fallibility.

== Los Ejércitos ==
Los Ejércitos (The Armies) is a novel of a country torn apart by war. Ismael, a retired old school teacher and his wife, Otilia, live morosely and modestly in the town of San José. Ismael loves to spy on his neighbor's wife, making his own wife to feel embarrassed, and there is a sense of idyll on everything going on until some family members begin to disappear and fear takes over the inhabitants of San José. One morning, after his usual walk, Ismael finds out that some soldiers of God knows what armies had taken away his neighbors. His wife had been looking for him, and unsuccessfully, he tries to find her instead. The fighting intensifies from all sides, and while the citizens of San José decide to run away and join the hordes of displaced peasants of Colombia, Ismael chooses to stay in the blasted and ghost township.

== Awards ==
- Premio Nacional de Cuento del Quindío, 1979
- Premio Iberoamericano de Libro de Cuentos Netzahualcóyotl, 1982
- Premio Internacional de Novela Breve Valencia, 1982
- II Premio Pedro Gómez Valderrama, 1992
- Premio Tusquets Editores de Novela, 2006
- Premio Nacional de Literatura, 2006- awarded in recognition of a life in letters by the Ministry of Culture.
- Independent Foreign Fiction Prize, 2009

== Bibliography ==
=== Novels ===
- Mateo solo. Entreletras, Bogotá, 1984; 2nd ed., Cooperativa Editorial Magisterio, 1995. ISBN 9582002093
- Juliana los mira. Anagrama, Barcelona, 1986.
- El incendiado. Editorial Planeta, Bogotá, 1988.
- Papá es santo y sabio. Carlos Valencia Editores, Bogotá, 1989.
- Pelea en el parque. Editorial Magisterio, Bogotá, 1991.
- Señor que no conoce luna. Editorial Planeta, Bogotá, 1992.
- Cuchilla. Editorial Norma, Bogotá, 2000.
- Plutón. Editorial Espasa-Calpe, Madrid, 2000.
- Los almuerzos. Universidad de Antioquia, Medellín, 2001.
- Juega el amor. Editorial Panamericana, Bogotá, 2002.
- El hombre que quería escribir una carta. Editorial Norma, Bogotá, 2002.
- En el lejero. Editorial Norma, Bogotá, 2003.
- Los ejércitos. Tusquets Editores, Barcelona, 2006.
- Los escapados. Editorial Norma, Bogotá, 2009.
- The Armies. New Directions Publishing, 2009. Translated by Anne McLean. The translation received the 2009 Independent Foreign Fiction Prize.
- La carroza de Bolívar. Tusquets Editores, Barcelona, 2012.
- Feast of the Innocents. MacLehose Press, 2015. Translated by Anne McLean and Anna Milsom.
- Stranger to the Moon. Mountain Leopard Press, scheduled for publication in November 2021.

=== Children's books ===
- Cuento para matar a un perro (y otros cuentos). Carlos Valencia Editores, Bogotá, 1989.
- El aprendiz de mago y otros cuentos de miedo. Colcultura, Bogotá, 1992.
- Las esquinas más largas. Editorial Panamericana, Bogotá, 1998.

=== Poetry ===
- El eterno monólogo de Llo (poema novelado). Testimonio, 1981.
- Las lunas de Chía. Fondo Editorial Universidad EAFIT, Medellín, 2004.

=== libre prep game ===
- Ahí están pintados. Editorial Panamericana, Bogotá, 1998.
