= Blooms of Darkness =

2006 novel by Aharon Appelfeld

- Author: Aharon Appelfeld
- Original title: פרחי האפלה; Pirḥe ha-afelah
- Translator: Jeffrey Green
- Language: Hebrew
- Publisher: Keter Publishing House
- Publication date: 2006
- Publication place: Israel
- English publication date: 2010
- Pages: 265
- ISBN: 9789650714161

Blooms of Darkness (Hebrew: פרחי האפלה, Pirhei HaAfela) is a 2006 novel by the Israeli writer Aharon Appelfeld. The narrative follows an 11-year-old Jewish boy who stays with a prostitute in a Ukrainian ghetto during World War II. Appelfeld said that with the book, he "wanted to explore the darkest places of human behavior and to show that even there, generosity and love can survive; that humanity and love can overcome cruelty and brutality". The novel, translated by Jeffrey M. Green won the Independent Foreign Fiction Prize in 2012.

== Reception ==
Carole Angier reviewed the book for The Independent, and mentioned two other works which combine the Holocaust and sexuality—The Night Porter and The Kindly Ones—but wrote that Blooms of Darkness is fundamentally different: "Too often, in the others, the sex seems to be the point. Here the point is the nature of memory, the growth of a writer, and above all the psychology of persecution and survival. The parents' dilemma of how to live with horror, and what to tell the children; Hugo's inexorable forgetting; the inability to understand what you fear – for Hugo, the meaning of 'whore', for survivors, the fact that most will never return – all are caught in Appelfeld's glancing, delicate prose." Shoshana Olidort of the Jewish Review of Books wrote: "The novel has all the characteristic trademarks of an Appelfeld work, yet it is less effective than many of his earlier books. Perhaps this is because reticence can only go so far, especially when the author is revisiting themes he has already explored at length. Still, this is a powerful novel and the mood of isolation that pervades the book’s final chapters is particularly haunting."

== See also ==
- 2006 in literature
- Israeli literature
