= Stefanie de Velasco =

German novelist (born 1978)

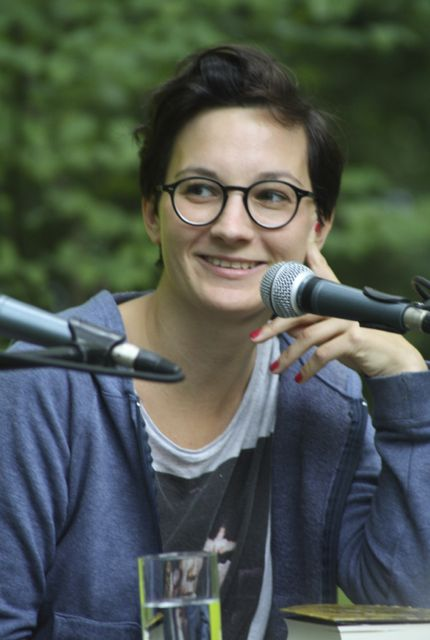
Stefanie de Velasco

Stefanie de Velasco (born 1978 in Oberhausen) is a German novelist as well as contributor to such publications as Die Zeit, Zitty, and the Frankfurter Allgemeine Zeitung. Born to a Spanish immigrant mother and a German father, de Velasco grew up in the Rhineland and studied in Bonn, Berlin and Warsaw. Her debut novel Tigermilch was published in 2013 to critical and commercial success. It has been translated into numerous languages; the English translation by Tim Mohr, titled Tiger Milk, was nominated for the Independent Foreign Fiction Prize and long-listed for the International Dublin Literary Award in 2015. Tigermilch has been adapted for the stage as well as a feature film that debuted in August 2017.
