= On the Water (novel) =

Book by Hans Maarten van den Brink

- First edition (Dutch)
- Author: Hans Maarten van den Brink
- Original title: Over het water
- Translator: Paul Vincent
- Language: Dutch
- Genre: Sports epics
- Publisher: Meulenhoff (Dutch); Faber and Faber (English)
- Publication date: 1998
- Publication place: Netherlands
- English publication date: 2001
- Media type: Book
- Pages: 144
- ISBN: 0-571-20924-6
- OCLC: 48194244
- Preceded by: De vooruitgang
- Followed by: Hart van glas

On the Water is a 1998 novel by Dutch author Hans Maarten van den Brink. It recounts an unlikely sporting partnership which is shattered by the advent of World War II. The central roles are those of Anton and David, a rowing crew from opposite sides of Amsterdam society, and Doktor Schneiderhahn, the enigmatic German rowing coach who brings them together.

The novel will be made into a film by Dutch production company Dynamic Entertainment by the same team that adapted Philip Pullman's The Butterfly Tattoo.

== Plot summary ==
On the Water is an intensely told tale of adolescent passion, narrated by Anton, a shy, uncomfortable outsider who harbours a yearning for a different kind of life that becomes symbolized in the river and in rowing. He joins the club, crossing the metaphorical and actual line which divides the town he lives in and forms an unlikely partnership with the calm, ironical David. Together they become a successful coxless pair, coached by an enigmatic German, Schneiderhahn. The story revels in descriptions of the physical exertion and emotional connection as it recreates pre-war Amsterdam. Telling the story in flashbacks, Anton now stands alone on a wintry evening facing a derelict and abandoned boathouse, recalling the long, hot summer of 1939 and mourning a lost world.

== Film, TV or theatrical adaptations ==
In 2010, a feature adaption of the novel will start production in the Netherlands and United Kingdom. The team working on the film is largely the same as that which produced the award-winning adaptation of Philip Pullman's The Butterfly Tattoo. In the film, the Olympic theme will be expanded to tie in with the 2012 Olympic Games in London. The role of Doktor Schneiderhahn will also be larger than in the novel.
