= Hans Maarten van den Brink =

Dutch journalist and writer

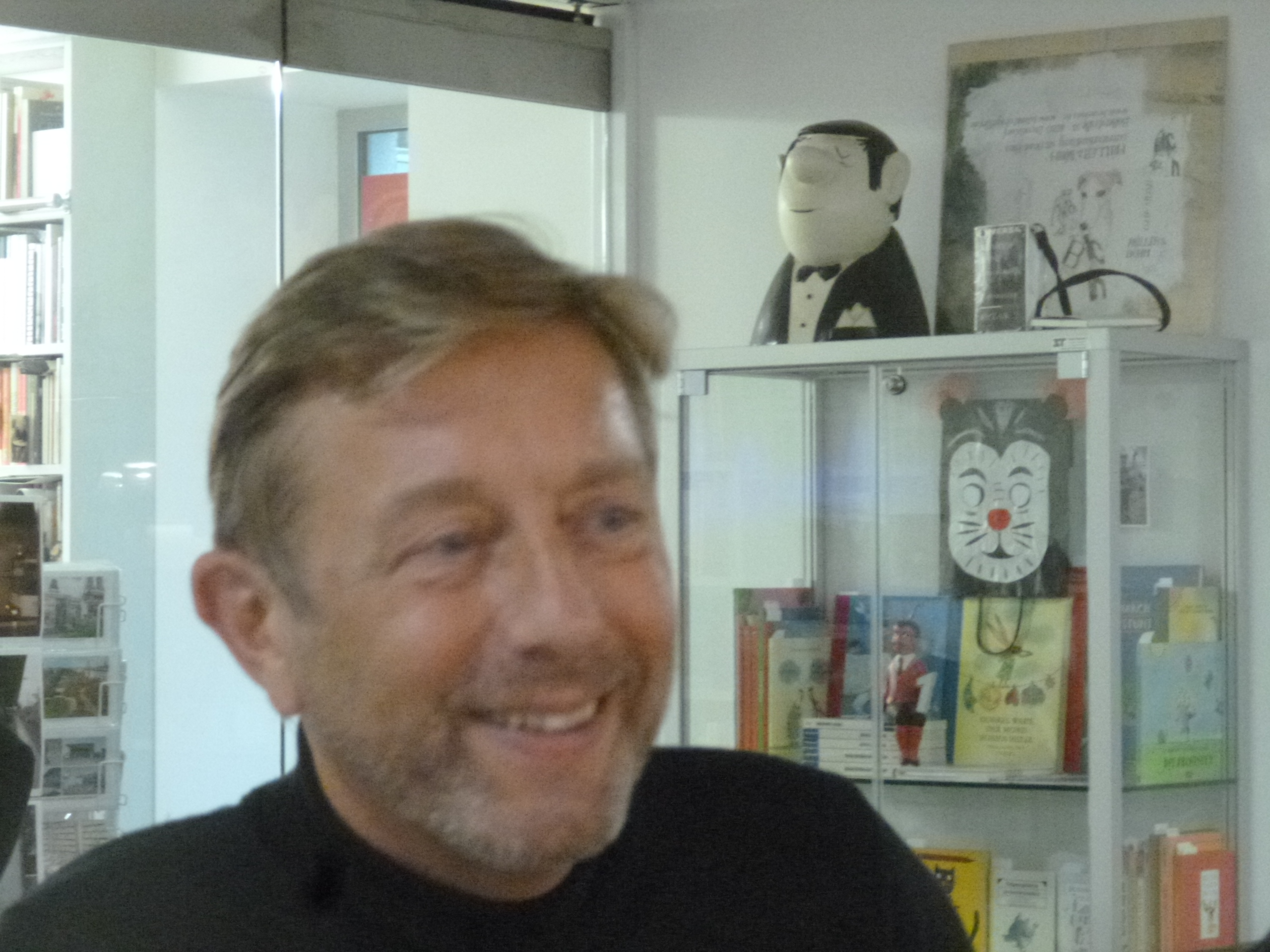
Hans Maarten van den Brink (2018)

Hans Maarten van den Brink (Dutch pronunciation: [ˈɦɑns ˈmaːrtə(ɱ) vɑn də(m) ˈbrɪŋk]; is a Dutch journalist and writer. He was born in 1956 in Oegstgeest. He began his career as an art editor at NRC Handelsblad. He worked in Spain for a few years as foreign correspondent, which provided material for a couple of his books (The Thirty Days of Saint Isidore, on bullfighting; and Spain: Body and Soul). He also worked in television. He is best known for his novella On the Water (1998) which was translated in many languages and won numerous literary prizes.
