= Adoption proceedings of Emma Rose =

2007 legal case in Georgia, United States

The adoption proceedings of Emma Rose concerned an application for the adoption of a six-year-old Georgia girl, Emma Rose, by Elizabeth Hadaway, a lesbian prospective mother in 2007.

Judge John Lee Parrott, a judge in Wilkinson County, Georgia, ruled against the adoption and ordered Emma returned to her biological mother, citing reasons rooted in the fact that the prospective adoptive mother, Elizabeth Hadaway, was a lesbian. Parrott then found Hadaway in contempt of court when Hadaway retained custody of the girl involved. After Emma was moved into foster care, Parrott refused to abide a court order from Bibb County, Georgia, restoring custody of Emma to Hadaway. Contributing to the case's notoriety were the fact that Hadaway had had legal custody of Emma without incident for several months prior to the adoption hearing over which Parrott presided, and the fact that Deborah Schultz, the girl's biological mother, refused to take custody of Emma, having been fully supportive both of Hadaway's initial custody of Emma and of the attempt to make the adoption permanent.

== Case ==
In January 2007, Parrott made his ruling denying Hadaway's adoption of Emma. Parrott accused Hadaway of being deceitful in her petition by applying as a single parent despite the fact that she was living with a domestic partner and had been for seven years. He also said that treating the couple as a family unit for the purposes of adoption would be a de facto violation of the state's constitutional ban on same sex marriages, reasoning that such treatment would mean that the couple would receive one of the benefits afforded to married couples. Parrott argued that adoption by a legally-married couple would provide a more secure environment for Emma than would Hadaway and her partner, because of the inability of a court to order child support payments if Hadaway and her partner split. Finally, Parrott expressed concern about the possibility of the child suffering a psychologically-harmful stigma in being raised in the rural community with two openly-homosexual women as her parents.

Parrott apparently learned, upon reading the case's home evaluation report at a November 2006, hearing, that Hadaway was homosexual and was living with her partner. While all had expected that the hearing would complete the adoption, Parrott, upon learning this information, declined to rule, saying that he needed to study state laws to determine whether adoption by homosexual parents was legal. Believing that Parrott would now rule against her, Hadaway subsequently terminated her relationship with her domestic partner and moved to Bibb County, a less rural area which Hadaway hoped would prove more sympathetic to her case.

For her part, Hadaway asserted that she was completely honest and forthcoming about her sexual orientation and living situation with the social worker who had visited her home, and that this is why the information was in the home evaluation report. She also said that she had the financial resources to pursue the adoption alone, and had included her partner's financial information only because the report mandated that information for all adults in the household.

== Follow up ==
Parrott's ruling remanded custody of Emma to Schultz, Emma's biological mother. However, when Hadaway attempted to turn over the child, Schultz refused to take custody. She cited her continued support for Hadaway's adoption of Emma. Hadaway retained custody of Emma and began pursuing her legal case in her new residence of Bibb County.

Parrott responded by finding Hadaway and her attorney criminally in contempt of court for not surrendering custody of Emma. The criminal orders were appealed, but Emma was moved into foster care in Wilkinson County. In April, a Bibb County judge ordered Emma to be returned to Hadaway's custody. However, Parrott and Emma's Wilkinson County foster parents refused to acknowledge the authority of a Bibb County court order and they did not surrender the girl. This prompted the Georgia chapter of the American Civil Liberties Union (ACLU) to sue Georgia's Department of Family and Child Services (DFCS) claiming that their keeping of Emma in foster care was illegal.

In May, the DFCS agreed to have Emma turned over from foster care to Schultz, her biological mother, which satisfied Parrott's initial order. Schultz then returned custody of Emma to Hadaway, in compliance with the Bibb County court order. As of June 2007, Hadaway's legal custody of Emma appeared to be uncontested, however Emma's adoptive status remained unresolved, and Hadaway would need to submit a new adoption petition in Bibb County.

== Appeal ==
On September 19, 2007, The Georgia Court of Appeals heard arguments from attorney Ken Choe who urged them to vacate the charges against Ms. Hadaway. On March 24, 2008, the contempt charges against Elizabeth Hadaway were officially reversed.
