= Ye Zhaoyan =

Chinese author based in Nanjing

- 叶兆言
- Born: July 1957 (age 69); Nanjing, Jiangsu, China
- Education: Nanjing University
- Relatives: Yao Cheng (姚澄), mother; Ye Zhicheng (叶至诚), father; Ye Shengtao, grandfather

Chinese name
- Traditional Chinese: 葉兆言
- Simplified Chinese: 叶兆言
Transcriptions
Standard Mandarin
- Hanyu Pinyin: Yè Zhàoyán

Ye Zhaoyan (born July 1957) is a Chinese author based in Nanjing. Many of his books have been translated into English and other languages.

His paternal grandfather Ye Shengtao was one of China's most influential educators, and his mother Yao Cheng (姚澄) was a famous Wuxi opera actress.

== Works translated into English ==
Year	Chinese title	Translated English title	Translator(s)
1994	花影	A Flower's Shade	?
1995	凶杀之都	"Murder Capital"	Shelly Bryant
1996	一九三七年的爱情	Nanjing 1937: A Love Story	Michael Berry
1996	左轮三五七	"Police Python 357"	Helen Wang
1997	南京人	People of Nanjing: A Cultural Perspective on a Historic Chinese City	David Charles East
1997	作家林美女士	"The Writer Ms. Lin Mei"	Jesse Field
1999	老南京·旧影秦淮	Old Nanjing: Reflections of Scenes on the Qinhuai River	Huang Lin, Hao Wei
2003	我们的心多么顽固	How Stubborn Our Hearts	?
2006	别人的爱情	Other People's Love	?
2019	南京传	Nanjing: The Story of a Chinese City	Fernando Arrieta
2022	通往父亲之路	The Character of Fatherhood	Xialin Ding, Andrew Endrey

A Flower's Shade was the basis for Chen Kaige's 1996 film Temptress Moon, although Ye was not credited in the film.
