= Korparna =

Book by Tomas Bannerhed

- First edition
- Author: Tomas Bannerhed
- Language: Swedish
- Published: 2011
- Publisher: Weyler Förlag
- Publication place: Sweden
- Awards: August Prize of 2011

Korparna (lit. The Ravens) is a 2011 novel by Swedish author Tomas Bannerhed. It won the August Prize in 2011.

A movie entitled Ravens based on the novel was released in 2017.
