= Tomas Bannerhed =

Swedish novelist

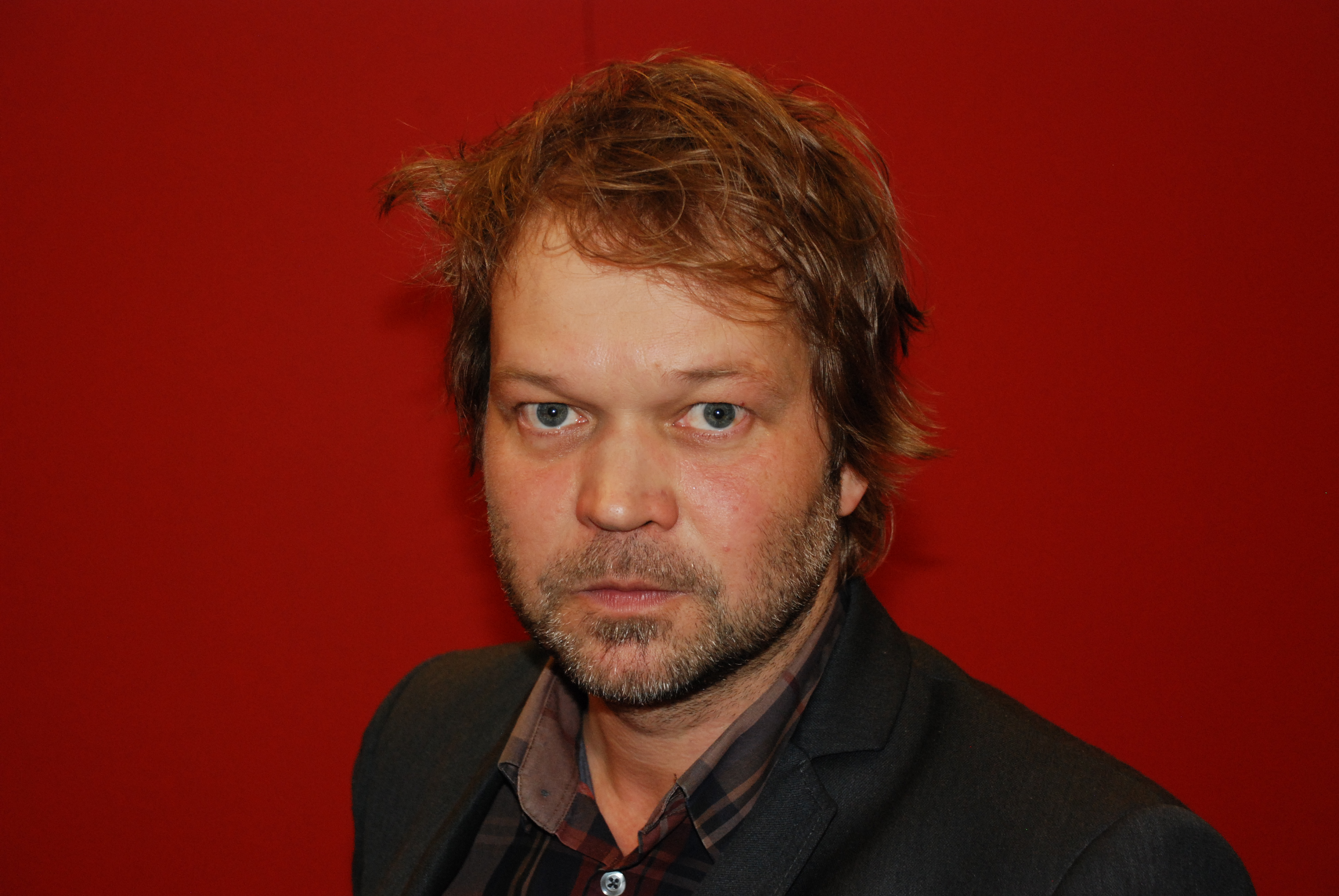
- Tomas Bannerhed in 2012.
- Born: 1966 (age 59–60)
- Writing career
- Language: Swedish
- Notable awards: August Prize; 2011 Korparna

Tomas Bannerhed (born 1966) is a Swedish novelist. He won the August Prize in 2011 for the novel Korparna.

== Selected bibliography ==
- Korparna (novel, 2011)
