= Nanjing 1937: A Love Story =

1996 romance novel by Ye Zhaoyan

- Author: Ye Zhaoyan
- Original title: 一九三七年的爱情
- Translator: Michael Berry
- Language: Chinese
- Genre: Romance
- Set in: Nanjing, 1937
- Publisher: Jiangsu Art and Literature Press, Columbia University Press
- Publication date: 1996
- Publication place: China
- English publication date: December 2002
- Media type: Print
- Pages: 234 (English)
- ISBN: 9780231127547

Nanjing 1937: A Love Story (Chinese: 一九三七年的爱情; Yijiusanqi nian de aiqing) is a 1996 romantic novel written by Ye Zhaoyan. Originally published in Chinese by Jiangsu Art and Literature Press, it was translated into English by Michael Berry and published by Columbia University Press in December 2002.

== Background and publication ==
=== Research ===
While preparing to write the novel, Ye consulted various primary and secondary historical sources. Throughout the story, Ye details every political and military development from 1 January 1937 until the Nanjing Massacre on 13 December of the same year, including "petty tabloid gossip" and minor cultural events, to create a "historical chronology".

=== Publication ===
Nanjing 1937 was originally published in China in 1996 by Jiangsu Art and Literature Press. It was later translated into English by Michael Berry and published by Columbia University Press in December 2002.

== Summary ==
The book tells the story of Ding Wenyu, a narcissistic language professor, and his affair with Ren Yuyuan, a young married Sino-Japanese woman. As the relationship between the two develops, it echoes the surrounding acts of war, but remains focused on the "domestic and trivial". After the death of Yuyuan's husband, the book ends with the two main characters fleeing Nanjing on the eve of the Massacre.

Ding Wenyu is a Chinese professor who was educated in the West. Described by The Independent as a "spineless antihero", he is guided spiritually by the characters created by Lu Xun and Lao She. Ding has been suggested as a metaphor for the Chinese national character, and considers his actions in a military-like way.

== Critical analysis ==
Despite the events of the book occurring during the Battle of Nanjing, Ye tackles the conflict in a way that differs from the typical nationalist view present in China. Instead of focusing on the "rape" of China by Japanese forces, he explores the relationship between a Chinese man and Sino-Japanese woman: love is the focus of the novel, not war. While there is violence present in the novel, the majority of it is domestic and focuses on the actions of Chinese people against each other, from abuse to murder. The only description of war violence comes in the final scenes of the novel, when Ding and Yuyuan flee from Nanjing: he is killed in the Japanese attack.

Anticipating the possibility of censorship due to his unorthodox approach, Ye wrote in the foreword: "I write this novel without any regard for what the consequences might be; heaven only knows if anyone will see it."

== Reception ==
When Nanjing 1937 was published in China, it became a bestseller.
