= Scott Moncrieff Prize =

Anglo-French literary prize

- Awarded for: The best translation into English of a full-length French work of literary merit.
- Sponsored by: Institut français du Royaume-Uni (current)
- Country: (United Kingdom) (Translations must be first published in the UK)
- Presented by: Translators Association (via the Society of Authors)
- Website: https://societyofauthors.org/prizes/translation-prizes/french-scott-moncrieff-prize/

The Scott Moncrieff Prize, established in 1965, and named after the translator C. K. Scott Moncrieff, is an annual £3,000 literary prize for French-to-English translation, awarded to one or more translators every year for a full-length work deemed by the Translators Association to have "literary merit". The runner-up receives £1,000. The prize is currently sponsored by the Institut Français du Royaume Uni. Only translations first published in the United Kingdom are considered for the accolade.

Sponsors of the prize have included the French Ministry of Culture, the French Embassy, and the Arts Council of England.

== Winners ==
=== 2020s ===
==== 2023 ====
- Winner: Frank Wynne for a translation of Standing Heavy by GauZ' (MacLehose Press)
- Runners-up: Adriana Hunter for a translation of The Anomaly by Hervé Le Tellier (Michael Joseph, Penguin Random House) and Clíona Ní Ríordáin for a translation of Yell, Sam, If You Still Can by Maylis Besserie (Lilliput Press)

Shortlisted:

- Adriana Hunter for a translation of The Anomaly by Hervé Le Tellier (Michael Joseph, Penguin Random House)
- Teresa Lavender Fagan for a translation of Marina Tsvetaeva: To Die in Yelabuga by Vénus Khoury–Ghata (Seagull Books)
- Clíona Ní Ríordáin for a translation of Yell, Sam, If You Still Can by Maylis Besserie (Lilliput Press)
- Lucy Raitz for a translation of Swann in Love by Marcel Proust (Pushkin Press)
- Shaun Whiteside for a translation of What You Need From The Night by Laurent Petitmangin (Picador, Pan Macmillan)
- Frank Wynne for a translation of Standing Heavy by GauZ' (MacLehose Press)

==== 2022 ====
Per the Society of Authors:

- Winner: Sarah Ardizzone for a translation of Men Don’t Cry by Faïza Guène (Cavassa Republic Press)
- Runner Up: Lara Vergnaud for a translation of The Ardent Swarm by Yamen Manai (Amazon Crossing)

Shortlisted:

- Chris Andrews for a translation of A Bookshop in Algiers by Kaouther Adimi (Serpent’s Tail)
- Frank Wynne for a translation of The Art of Losing by Alice Zeniter (Pan Macmillan and Picador)
- Sheila Fischman for a translation of Em by Kim Thúy (Seven Stories Press)

==== 2021 ====
Per the Society of Authors:

- Winner: Sam Taylor for a translation of The Invisible Land by Hubert Mingarelli (Granta)
- Runner up: Emily Boyce for a translation of A Long Way Off by Pascal Garnier (Gallic Books)

Shortlisted:

- Helen Stevenson for a translation of The Death of Comrade President by Alain Mabanckou (Profile Books: Serpent’s Tail)
- Roland Glasser for a translation of Real Life by Adeline Dieudonné (World Editions)
- Laura Marris for a translation of Those Who Forget by Géraldine Schwarz (Pushkin Press)
- Aneesa Abbas Higgins for a translation of Winter in Sokcho by Elisa Shua Dusapin (Daunt Books Publishing)

==== 2020 (presented 2021) ====
- Winner: Aneesa Abbas Higgins for a translation of A Girl Called Eel by Ali Zamir (Jacarada Books)
- Runner-up: Frank Wynne for a translation of Animalia by Jean-Baptiste del Amo (Fitzcarraldo Editions)

Shortlisted:

Geoffrey Strachan for a translation of The Archipelago of Another Life by Andreï Makine (MacLehose Press)

- Jordan Stump for a translation of The Cheffe by Marie NDiaye (MacLehose Press)
- Mark Hutchinson for a translation of The Governesses by Anne Serre (Les Fugitives)
- Natasha Lehrer for a translation of Memories of Low Tide by Chantal Thomas (Pushkin Press)

=== 2010s ===
==== 2019 (presented 2020) ====
- Winner: Linda Coverdale for a translation of The Old Slave and the Mastiff by Patrick Chamoiseau (Dialogue Books)
- Runner-up: David Warriner for a translation of We Were the Salt of the Sea by Roxanne Bouchard (Orenda Books)

Shortlisted:

- Penny Hueston for a translation of Our Life in the Forest by Marie Darrieussecq (Text Publishing)
- Adriana Hunter for a translation of Woman at Sea by Catherine Poulain (Jonathan Cape)
- Tina Kover for a translation of Disoriental by Négar Djavadi (Europa Editions)
- Geoffrey Strachan for a translation of Tropic of Violence by Nathacha Appanah (MacLehose Press)

==== 2018 (presented 2019) ====
- Winner: Sophie Yanow for her translation of Pretending is Lying by Dominique Goblet (New York Review Comics)
- Runner-up: Frank Wynne for his translation of Vernon Subutex 1 by Virginie Despentes (MacLehose Press/Quercus)

Shortlistees:

- Aneesa Abbas Higgins for her translation of Seven Stones by Vénus Khoury-Ghata (Jacaranda Books)
- Sophie Lewis for her translation of Blue Self-Portrait by Noémi Lefebvre (Les Fugitives)
- Helen Stevenson for her translation of Black Moses by Alain Mabanckou (Profile Books)

==== 2017 (presented 2018) ====
- Winner: Will McMorran and Thomas Wynn for their translation of The 120 Days of Sodom by the Marquis de Sade (Penguin Classics)
- Commended: Antony Melville for his translation of Anicet or the Panorama by Louis Aragon (Atlas Press)

==== 2016 (presented 2017) ====
- Winner: Natasha Lehrer and Cécile Menon for their translation of Suite for Barbara Loden by Nathalie Léger (Les Fugitives)
- Commended: Sophie Lewis for her translation of Héloïse is Bald by Émilie du Turckheim (Jonathan Cape)

==== 2015 (presented 2016) ====
- Winner: Frank Wynne for his translation of Harraga by Boualem Sansal (Bloomsbury)
- Commended: David Bellos for his translation Portrait of a Man by Georges Perec (MacLehose Press)

==== 2014 ====
- Winner: Rachel Galvin for her translation of Hitting the Streets by Raymond Queneau (Carcanet Press)
- Commended: Lulu Norman for her translation of Horses of God by Mahi Binebine (Granta)

==== 2013 ====
- Winner: Beverley Bie Brahic for her translation of The Little Auto by Guillaume Apollinaire (CB Editions)
- Commended: Euan Cameron for his translation of A Journey to Nowhere - Detours and Riddles in the Lands and History of Courland by Jean-Paul Kauffman (MacLehose Press)

==== 2012 ====
- Winner: Malcolm Imrie for his translation of Fear by Gabriel Chevallier (Serpent's Tail)
- Commended: Giles MacDonogh for his translation of Testicles by Blandine Vié (Prospect Books)

==== 2011 ====
- Winner: Adriana Hunter for Beside the Sea by Véronique Olmi (Peirene)
- Runners-up: Sarah Ardizzone for her translation of Daniel Pennac’s School Blues (Maclehose Press) and Frank Wynne for his translation of Boualem Sansal’s An Unfinished Business (Bloomsbury)

==== 2010 ====
- Winner: Susan Wicks for Cold Spring in Winter by Valérie Rouzeau (Arc Publications)
- Joint runners-up: Linda Coverdale for The Strategy of Antelopes by Jean Hatzfeld (Serpent’s Tail) and Lazer Lederhendler for Nikolski by Nicolas Dickner (Portobello)

=== 2000s ===
==== 2009 ====
- Winner: Polly McLean for Gross Margin by Laurent Quintreau (Harvill Secker)
- Runner up: Barbara Mellor for Resistance: Memoirs of Occupied France by Agnes Humbert (Bloomsbury)

==== 2008 ====
- Winner: Frank Wynne for Holiday in a Coma and Love Lasts Three Years by Frédéric Beigbeder (Fourth Estate)
- Runner up: John Brownjohn for Elizabeth 1st and Mary Stuart by Anka Muhlstein (Haus Books)

==== 2007 ====
- Winner: Sarah Adams for Just Like Tomorrow by Faïza Guène (Chatto)
- Runner up: Geoffrey Strachan for The Woman who Waited by Andrei Makine (Sceptre)

==== 2006 ====
- Winner: Linda Coverdale for A Time for Machetes by Jean Hatzfeld (Serpent’s Tail)
- Runner up: Anthea Bell for Love Without Resistance by Gilles Rozier (Little, Brown)

==== 2005 ====
- Winner: John Berger and Lisa Appignanesi for The Year is '42 by Nella Bielski (Bloomsbury)

==== 2004 ====
- Winner: Ian Monk for Monsieur Malaussene by Daniel Pennac (Harvill)

==== 2003 ====
- Winner: Linda Asher for Ignorance by Milan Kundera (Faber and Faber)

==== 2002 ====
- Winner: Ina Rilke for Balzac and the Little Chinese Seamstress by Dai Sijie (Chatto & Windus)

==== 2001 ====
- Winner: Barbara Bray for On Identity by Amin Maalouf (Harvill)

==== 2000 ====
- Winner: Patricia Clancy for The Dark Room at Longwood by Jean-Paul Kauffmann (Harvill)

=== 1990s ===
==== 1999 ====
- Winner: Margaret Mauldon for Against Nature by Joris-Karl Huysmans (OUP)

==== 1998 ====
- Winner: Geoffrey Strachan for Le Testament Francais by Andreï Makine (Sceptre)

==== 1997 ====
- Winners: Janet Lloyd for The Spears of Twilight by Philippe Descola (Harper Collins)

and Christopher Hampton for Art by Yasmina Reza (Faber and Faber)

==== 1996 ====
- Winner: David Coward for Belle du Seigneur by Albert Cohen (Viking)

==== 1995 ====
- Winner: Gilbert Adair for A Void by Georges Perec (Harvill)

==== 1994 ====
No Award

==== 1993 ====
- Winner: Christine Donougher for The Book of Nights by Sylvie Germain (Dedalus)

==== 1992 ====
- Winners: Barbara Wright for The Midnight Love Feast by Michel Tournier (Collins)

and James Kirkup for Painted Shadows by Jean Baptiste-Niel (Quartet)

==== 1991 ====
- Winner: Brian Pearce for Bread and Circuses by Paul Veyne (Penguin)

==== 1990 ====
- Winner: Beryl and John Fletcher for The Georgics by Claude Simon (Calder)

=== 1980s ===
==== 1989 ====
- Winner: Derek Mahon for Selected Poems by Philippe Jaccotet (Viking Penguin)

==== 1988 ====
- Winner: Robyn Marsack for The Scorpion-Fish by Nicolas Bouvier (Carcanet)

==== 1987 ====
- Winner: Barbara Wright for Grabinoulor by Pierre Albert-Birot (Atlas)

==== 1986 ====
- Winners: Barbara Bray for The Lover by Marguerite Duras (Collins)

and Richard Nice for Distinction by Pierre Bourdieu (Routledge)

==== 1985 ====
- Winner: Quintin Hoare for War Diaries: Notebooks from a Phoney War by Jean-Paul Sartre (Verso)
- Runner up: Barbara Wright for Childhood by Nathalie Sarraute (Calder)

==== 1984 ====
- Winner: Roy Harris for Course in General Linguistics by F. de Saussure (Duckworth)

==== 1983 ====
- Winner: Sian Reynolds for The Wheels of Commerce by Fernand Braudel (Collins)

==== 1982 ====
- Winner: Anne Carter for Gemini by Michel Tournier (Collins)

==== 1981 ====
- Winner: Paul Falla for The World of the Citizen in Republican Rome by C. Nicolet (Batsford)

==== 1980 ====
- Winner: Brian Pearce for The Institutions of France under the Absolute Monarchy 1598-1789 by Roland Mousnier (University of Chicago Press)

=== 1970s ===
==== 1979 ====
- Winner: John and Doreen Weightman for The Origin of Table Manners by Claude Levi-Strauss (Jonathan Cape)

and Richard Mayne for Memoirs (Collins)

==== 1978 ====
- Winner: Janet Lloyd for The Gardens of Adonis by Marcel Detienne (Harvester Press)

and David Hapgood for The Totalitarian Temptation by Jean-Francois Revel (Secker & Warburg)

==== 1977 ====
- Winner: Peter Wait for French Society 1789-1970 by George Dupeux (Methuen)

==== 1976 ====
- Winner: Brian Pearce for Leninism under Lenin by Marcel Liebman (Jonathan Cape)

and Douglas Parmee for The Second World War by Henri Michel (Andre Deutsch)

==== 1975 ====
- Winners: D. McN. Lockie for France in the Age of Louis XIII & Richelieu by Victor-L Tapie (Macmillan)

and Joanna Kilmartin for Scars on the Soul by Francoise Sagan (Andre Deutsch)

==== 1974 ====
- Winner: John and Doreen Weightman for From Honey to Ashes by Claude Levi-Strauss (Collins) and Tristes Tropiques by Claude Levi-Strauss (Jonathan Cape)

==== 1973 ====
- Winner: Barbara Bray for The Erl King by Michel Tournier (Collins)

==== 1972 ====
- Winner: Paul Stevenson for Germany in our Time by Alfred Grosser (Pall Mall Press)
- Special Awards: Joanna Kilmartin for Sunlight on Cold Water by Francois Sagan (Weidenfeld & Nicolson), and Elizabeth Walter for A Scent of Lilies by Claire Gallois (Collins)

==== 1971 ====
- Winner: Maria Jolas for Between Life and Death by Nathalie Sarraute (Calder & Boyars)
- Runner-up: Jean Stewart for Maltaverne by Francois Mauriac (Eyre & Spottiswoode) and The Taking of the Bastille by Jacques Godechot (Faber and Faber)

==== 1970 ====
- Winner: W.G. Corp for The Spaniard by Bernard Clavel (Harrap)
- Richard Barry for The Suez Expedition 1956 by Andre Beaufre (Faber)
- Elaine P. Halperin for The Other Side of the Mountain by Michel Bernanos (Gollancz)

=== 1960s ===
==== 1969 ====
- Winner: Terence Kilmartin for Anti-memoirs by Andre Malraux (Hamish Hamilton) and The Girls by Henry de Montherlant (Weidenfeld & Nicolson)
- Special Award: Anthony Rudolf for Selected Poems by Yves Bonnefoy (Jonathan Cape)

==== 1968 ====
- Winner: Jean Stewart for French North Africa by Jacques Berque (Faber)

==== 1967 ====
- Winner: John and Doreen Weightman for Jean Jacques Rousseau by Jean Guehenno (Routledge & Kegan Paul)

==== 1966 ====
- Winners: Barbara Bray for From Tristram to Yorick by Henri Fluchero (OUP) and Peter Wiles for A Young Trouti by Roger Vailland (Collins)

==== 1965 ====
- Winner: Edward Hyams for Joan of Arc (Regino Iornoud Macdonald)
- Runner-up: Humphrey Hare for Memoirs of Zeus by Maurice Druon (Hart-Davis)
