= Blood quota =

Concept of Gonzalo Thought

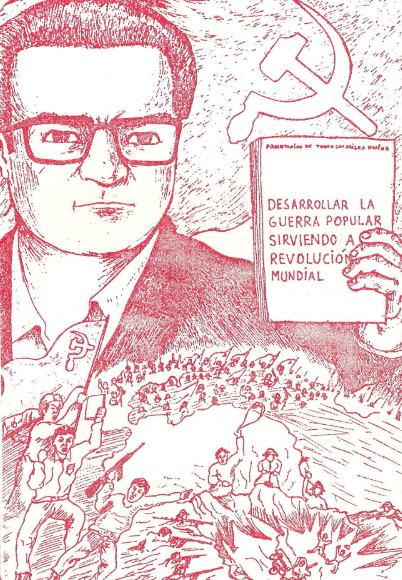
Abimael Guzman holding a book whose title reads "Develop the people's war in service of the world revolution"

The "blood quota" (Spanish: cuota de sangre) is a concept associated with Abimael Guzmán, leader of the Shining Path, a Maoist insurgent group active in Peru. It refers to the ideological expectation that a revolutionary must be willing to sacrifice their life for the global proletarian revolution. This principle, central to "Gonzalo Thought," framed violence and death as essential components of the revolutionary struggle.

Under this doctrine, Shining Path militants were encouraged to embrace extreme measures, including acts of terrorism, to mobilize support and suppress opposition. Hatred and violence were deliberately incited to gain adherence to their cause, with cruelty and fear leveraged as tools for control and obedience. Death in service to the revolution was glorified as a heroic act.

The implementation of the blood quota contributed to widespread atrocities during the Shining Path's insurgency, which spanned from the 1980s to the early 1990s. These acts included targeted assassinations, bombings, massacres, and other forms of violence that resulted in tens of thousands of deaths and significant societal disruption across Peru. The group's campaign of terror persisted until Guzmán's capture in 1992, which marked the beginning of the movement's decline.

== Background ==
The Shining Path believed in the necessity of a violent revolution to overthrow the Peruvian government and establish a communist state. The concept of the "Blood Quota" was an integral part of Gonzalo thought and reflected the belief that a certain number of people needed to be killed or sacrificed in order to achieve their revolutionary goals. Increasing conflicts and radicalizing oppositions cannot have any other effect than to accelerate history, bringing closer the day of final triumph.

This notion itself is rooted in Maoist ideology, which advocated for the use of violence and protracted people's war as a means of achieving a communist revolution.

== The People's War ==
Guzmán announced that “the triumph of the revolution will cost a million deaths.” "Paying the quota" meant that the senderista would "cross rivers of blood" for the triumph of the "people's war". The aim was to incite the Peruvian State to carry out acts of violence against the civilian population so that, in this way, the Shining Path could obtain popular support and the capacity for mass mobilization: the violence of the reaction had revolutionary effects by growing hatred and a desire for revenge among those affected, which in turn would lead to an acceleration of the ruin of the old order.

In December 1982 President Fernando Belaúnde declared a state of emergency and ordered that the Peruvian Armed Forces fight the Shining Path, granting them extraordinary powers. Military leadership adopted practices used by Argentina during the Dirty War, committing state terrorism, with entire villages being massacred by the armed forces while civilians endured forced disappearance. When the military started organizing peasant militias ("rondas") to fight Senderistas, the Shining Path heavily retaliated: during the Lucanamarca massacre, nearly 70 indigenous people were murdered. The youngest victim was six months old, the oldest about seventy. Most were killed by machete and axe hacks; some were shot in the head at close range. Discussing the massacre, Guzmán asserted that "the main point was to make them understand that we were a hard nut to crack, and that we were ready for anything, anything (..)".

== Media depiction ==
The violence perpetuated by the Shining Path and the government inspired Alonso Cueto to write about the insecurity of the period, with his most well-known novel The Blue Hour (2005) being adapted into an eponymous movie in 2014.

== See also ==
- Peruvian prison massacres
