= Blue hour (disambiguation) =

Blue hour is a period of twilight.

Blue Hour, Bluehour, or The Blue Hour may also refer to:

- Bluehour, a defunct restaurant in Portland, Oregon
- Blue Hour, a 1960 jazz album
- The Blue Hour (album), a 2018 album by Suede
- The Blue Hour (1953 film), a West German comedy film directed by Veit Harlan
- The Blue Hour (1971 film), an American exploitation film
- The Blue Hour (2007 film), a 2007 American drama film
- The Blue Hour (2014 film), a 2014 Peruvian drama film
- The Blue Hour (2015 film), a 2015 Thai horror film
- Blue Hour (poetry collection), a 2003 collection of poetry by Carolyn Forché
- The Blue Hour (novel), a 2005 novel by Alonso Cueto
- The Blue Hour, a 2024 novel by Paula Hawkins
- "Blue Hour", a song by Tomorrow X Together from the EP Minisode1: Blue Hour

== See also ==
- "L'Heure Bleue", perfume made by Guerlain
- L'Heure Bleue, jazz album by Franz Koglmann
