= 99 Francs =

99 Francs may refer to:

- 99 Francs (novel), a 2000 novel by French writer Frédéric Beigbede
- 99 Francs (film), a 2007 French satirical comedy-drama film, based on the novel
