= The Art of Losing =

The Art of Losing may refer to:

- The Art of Losing (American Hi-Fi album), 2003
- The Art of Losing (The Anchoress album), 2021
- The Art of Losing (song), a song by American Hi-Fi
- The Art of Losing, a novel by French author Alice Zeniter
- The Art of Losing (film), 2004 Spanish-Colombian thriller film directed by Sergio Cabrera
