= The Most Precious of Cargoes =

The Most Precious of Cargoes may refer to:

- The Most Precious of Cargoes (novel), a 2019 novel by Jean-Claude Grumberg
- The Most Precious of Cargoes (film), a 2024 French animated drama film based on the novel
