= Love Lasts Three Years =

- Film poster
- French: L'Amour dure trois ans
- Directed by: Frédéric Beigbeder
- Written by: Frédéric Beigbeder; Christophe Turpin; Gilles Verdiani
- Based on: Love Lasts Three Years by Frédéric Beigbeder
- Produced by: Michaël Gentile; Alain Kruger
- Starring: Gaspard Proust; Louise Bourgoin
- Cinematography: Yves Cape
- Music by: Martin Rappeneau
- Production companies: The Film; Akn Productions; EuropaCorp; France 2 Cinéma
- Distributed by: EuropaCorp Distribution
- Release dates: 10 December 2011 (Pau International Film Festival); 18 January 2012 (France & Belgium)
- Running time: 105 minutes
- Countries: France; Belgium
- Languages: French; English
- Budget: €6.7 million
- Box office: $5.7 million

Love Lasts Three Years (French: L'Amour dure trois ans) is a 2011 French-Belgian comedy film written and directed by Frédéric Beigbeder and starring Gaspard Proust. It is based on Beigbeder's novel Love Lasts Three Years.

== Cast ==
- Gaspard Proust as Marc Marronnier
- Louise Bourgoin as Alice
- JoeyStarr as Jean-Georges
- Jonathan Lambert as Pierre
- Frédérique Bel as Kathy
- Nicolas Bedos as Antoine
- Elisa Sednaoui as Anne
- Anny Duperey as Marc's mother
- Bernard Menez as Marc's father
- Pom Klementieff as Julia
- Thomas Jouannet as Surf teacher
