= In the Beginning Was the Sea =

1983 novel by Tomás González

In the Beginning Was the Sea (original Spanish title: Primero estaba el mar) is a 1983 novel by the Colombian novelist Tomás González. The novel is set in the Gulf of Uraba in Antioquia, in the remote northeast corner of Colombia's Caribbean coast. It recounts, in fictional form, the life and death of the novelist's older brother Juan Emiliano who was murdered on his farm in Titumate in 1977.

Gonzalez has said that he wrote the novel in his early 30s, when he was working in a bar in Bogotá. He migrated to Miami with his family before the book could be launched, and stayed in the US for the next two decades. Although the novel was well-reviewed, it sold few copies initially. It was not until 2001, when Editorial Norma brought out a new edition, that it gained wider circulation and recognition. It was translated into English by Frank Wynne and published by Pushkin Press in 2014. It was then shortlisted for the Independent Foreign Fiction Prize.
