= A Life Without End =

2018 novel by Frédéric Beigbeder

- Author: Frédéric Beigbeder
- Original title: Une vie sans fin
- Translator: Frank Wynne
- Language: French
- Publisher: Éditions Grasset
- Publication date: 3 January 2018
- Publication place: France
- English publication date: 14 April 2020
- Pages: 360
- ISBN: 9782246812616

A Life Without End (French: Une vie sans fin) is a 2018 novel by the French writer Frédéric Beigbeder.

== Plot ==
Frédéric, a famous media personality, turns 50 and wants to live forever. He brings his 10-year-old daughter and a Japanese robot—Pepper—to meet international experts on human life extension.

== Reception ==
Kirkus Reviews wrote that the book has "a breezy style", full of wit, sarcasm and gallows humour, and "an endearing, genre-bending wackiness".

The book was awarded the 2018 prix Rive Gauche à Paris.
