= Love Lasts Three Years (novel) =

1997 novel by Frédéric Beigbeder

- Author: Frédéric Beigbeder
- Original title: L'amour dure trois ans
- Translator: Frank Wynne
- Language: French
- Publisher: Éditions Grasset
- Publication date: 1997
- Publication place: France
- English publication date: 2007
- Pages: 233

Love Lasts Three Years (French: L'amour dure trois ans) is a 1997 novel by the French writer Frédéric Beigbeder.

== Plot ==
The former dandy Marc Marronnier divorces Anne after three years of marriage. He has fallen in love with Alice and tries to convince her to leave her husband.

== Reception ==
The Daily Telegraph's Alastair Sooke compared Love Lasts Three Years to Holiday in a Coma, a 1994 novel by Beigbeder about the same main character. Sooke said it retains "splashes of the acid wit" from the earlier book, but Love Lasts Three Years is a more reflective work with simpler language and fragmentary chapters, which successfully convey the feeling of being in love.

The English translation by Frank Wynne, published in a shared edition with Holiday in a Coma, received the 2008 Scott Moncrieff Prize.

== Adaptation ==
The book was the basis for the 2011 film Love Lasts Three Years, written and directed by Beigbeder and starring Gaspard Proust.
