= Un barrage contre l'Atlantique =

2022 novel by Frédéric Beigbeder

- Author: Frédéric Beigbeder
- Language: French
- Publisher: Éditions Grasset
- Publication date: 5 January 2022
- Publication place: France
- Pages: 272
- ISBN: 9782246826552

Un barrage contre l'Atlantique (lit. 'A Dam Against the Atlantic') is a 2022 novel by the French writer Frédéric Beigbeder.

== Plot ==
Un barrage contre l'Atlantique is an autobiographical novel similar to Frédéric Beigbeder's previous A French Novel and has the subtitle Un roman français, tome 2 (lit. 'A French Novel, Volume 2'). It is largely told in fragments, consisting of paragraphs with one sentence each. Inspired by a painting he spontaneously buys, Beigbeder reminisces about his life and French society, from his childhood in the 1970s through his time as a dandy in Paris, his relationship with Laura Smet, and his hermit-like life in Guéthary. The book was written at the compound of Benoît Bartherotte, a wealthy man who tries to stop the erosion of Cap Ferret by building a large and unauthorised seawall.

== Reception ==
Grégory Plouviez of Le Parisien wrote that the book is written with "exquisite melancholy". Jean-Paul Brighelli of Marianne wrote that Beigbeder handles the fragmentary form in a way similar to Heraclitus and Emil Cioran and that Un barrage contre l'Atlantique is a more profound book than A French Novel. The French Review wrote that the book is "much more disparate in content and form" than A French Novel and that "Beigbeder’s admirers and detractors will find much fodder here".
