= Geoffrey Strachan =

Translator

Geoffrey Strachan is a noted translator of French and German literature into English. He is best known for his renderings of the novels of French-Russian writer Andreï Makine. In addition, he has also translated works by Yasmina Réza, Nathacha Appanah, Elie Wiesel and Jérôme Ferrari. Uniquely, he has won both the Scott-Moncrieff Prize (for translation from French) and the Schlegel-Tieck Prize (for translation from German).

== Selected translations ==
=== Andrei Makine ===
- A Hero's Daughter
- A Life's Music
- Brief Loves That Live Forever
- Confessions of a Lapsed Standard-bearer
- Human Love
- Le Testament Francais
- Music of a Life
- Once Upon the River Love
- Requiem for a Lost Empire
- The Crime of Olga Arbyelina
- The Earth and Sky of Jacques Dorme
- The Life of an Unknown Man
- The Woman Who Waited
- The Archipelago of Another Life
- My Armenian Friend

=== Others ===
- Elie Wiesel: The Judges
- Irenäus Eibl-Eibesfeldt: Love and Hate
- Jerome Ferrari: Where I Left My Soul
- Melita Maschmann: Account Rendered: A Dossier on my Former Self
- Nathacha Appanah: The Last Brother
- Yasmina Reza: Adam Haberberg
