= The Life of an Unknown Man =

2009 novel by Andreï Makine

- Author: Andreï Makine
- Original title: La vie d'un homme inconnu
- Translator: Geoffrey Strachan
- Language: French
- Publisher: Éditions du Seuil
- Publication date: 8 January 2009
- Publication place: France
- English publication date: 5 June 2012
- Pages: 292
- ISBN: 9782020982962

The Life of an Unknown Man (French: La vie d'un homme inconnu) is a novel by the French-Russian writer Andreï Makine. It is about an exiled Russian writer in Paris who, when he is in his 50s, no longer considered interesting and left by his younger girlfriend, reassesses his life, future prospects and identity. The Guardian described the main character as "a warped mirror" of Makine, "what he might have been were he not successful".
