= Dreams of My Russian Summers =

French novel by Andrei Makine

- Author: Andrei Makine
- Translator: Geoffrey Strachan
- Language: French
- Genre: novel
- Publisher: Mercure de France (Fr); Arcade Publishing (En)
- Publication date: 1995 (Fr); 1997 (En)
- Publication place: France
- Pages: 241 (En)
- ISBN: 1-55970-383-0 (En)

Dreams of My Russian Summers (French: Le Testament français) is a French novel by Andrei Makine, originally published in 1995. It won two top French awards, the Prix Goncourt and the Prix Médicis. The novel is told from the first-person perspective and tells the fictional story of a boy's memories and experiences with his French grandmother in the Soviet Union in the 1960s and 1970s.

== Characters ==
Charlotte Lemonnier, also known in Russian as Sharlota Norbertovna, is the heroine of the story, born in France in the early 1900s in the village of Neuilly-sur-Seine. She is a calm and dreamy Frenchwoman living in the town of Saranza by the Russian steppe, who teaches her grandchildren, a young boy and girl, of her French and Russian life through memories and newspaper clippings.

The Narrator is the young boy of the story who grows up in the 1960s and '70s. He remains nameless except in the very end of the book. (He is only called Alyosha once by his grandmother.) His nickname by his Russian classmates is "Frantsuz" - the Russian word for Frenchman. He admires his grandmother more than anyone and is confused by his conflicting French and Russian heritages. This conflict is the main theme of the novel.

The Narrator's Sister is another nameless character, like her brother. She is also Charlotte's granddaughter. Although she is present in the beginning of the novel accompanying her brother in their visits to Charlotte, she later goes to study in Moscow and is no longer mentioned.

Pashka is a peer of the narrator who is also a loner. He is rejected by his classmates and wants nothing to do with them. He avoids society and conformity because he is more interested in nature and the outside world. Although he and the narrator never officially become "friends," their mutual solitude brings them closer together.

Norbert is Charlotte's father. Little is known of him other than he was a doctor who died at age 48, leaving Charlotte and her mother without much money.

Albertine is Charlotte's mother and Norbert's wife, 26 years his junior. After Norbert's death she traveled several times between Siberia and France, taking Charlotte with her. She eventually settled in Siberia with Charlotte, battling severe depression and a morphine addiction. After returning to France one last time, she leaves Charlotte with her brother, Vincent, and leaves for Siberia, never to come back. She dies 2 years after reuniting with Charlotte, now in her 20s.

Vincent is Charlotte's uncle and a reporter for the French newspaper Excelsior. He took photos of the flood of 1910, and ultimately inspired Charlotte to collect newspaper clippings. He dies in World War I.

Fyodor is Charlotte's Russian husband, who marries her roughly a year after Albertine's death. It is unknown how he and Charlotte met. He works as a judge. He is arrested on a New Year's Eve in the beginning of World War II. He is later sent to fight in the war and is reported dead twice, yet he returns to Charlotte after the war, only to die less than a year later of his wounds.

Sergei is Charlotte's son, the product of her rape by an unknown Uzbek man. Even though he is not Fyodor's true son, he is accepted and loved by him and Charlotte.

Mother is the nameless mother of the narrator and Charlotte's daughter. When her son is 14 or 15, she dies suddenly of an illness that she kept secret from her family.

Nikolai is the narrator's father and the nameless mother's husband. Little is said of him except that he dies of a heart attack only months after his wife's death.

Aunt is the nameless aunt of the narrator who moves in to care for him and his sister after their parents' death. She is portrayed as strong, resourceful, and instrumental in showing the young boy the "true" Russia - bitter, violent, and proud.

Alex Bond is a Russian businessman employed by the narrator (now in his thirties) to see if Charlotte is still alive.

== Plot ==
The book opens with the narrator leafing through photographs of old relatives in his grandmother's house in Saranza, a fictional Russian town on the border of the steppe. His grandmother, Charlotte Lemonnier, comes in and starts talking about the photographs and her memories to the boy and his sister. The novel is characterized by stories like this: a collection of Charlotte's memories and the narrator's memories, intertwining so that the text moves seamlessly through their lives in a dreamlike fashion. The movement between Charlotte's French past and the Soviet present causes conflict in the boy's identity as the novel explores both sides of his heritage.

Charlotte begins the novel by transporting her grandchildren to the French 'Atlantis' during the flooding of Paris in 1910. So begins the narrator's desire to learn all about this mysterious French past. He describes the town of Saranza in-between these stories. It is a quiet town bordering the Russian steppe that is lined with old izbas, traditional Russian houses made of logs. The town is a strange mixture of these old relics and the new regime's style that discards any excess or superfluous design, showcasing the theme of the clash between past and present.

At the return of autumn, the boy narrator and his sister return to their hometown, an unnamed industrial, Stalinist-style city on the banks of the Volga. He quickly falls back into the pace of Russian life with its schooling and paramilitary exercises. He becomes confused by the conflicting images with which he has been presented: his grandmother's romanticized French image of Tsar Nicholas II versus "Nicholas the Bloody" as taught at his Soviet school.

The narration reveals more of Charlotte's early life. After the death of her father Norbert, her widowed mother Albertine becomes unstable, making visits to Paris only to insist on returning to Russia. It is the grave of her husband that keeps bringing her back to the Siberian town of Boyarsk. Young Charlotte, roughly age nine, begins to give French lessons to the Governor of Boyarsk's daughter. She becomes caretaker to her mother, who is revealed as a morphine addict. After several relapses, Albertine takes Charlotte with her back to France. But in July 1914, when Charlotte is eleven, Albertine temporarily goes back to Siberia, to put an end to her Siberian life. She never returns to France. Then war breaks out and Charlotte's only caretaker, her uncle Vincent, is killed in battle.

Time jumps ahead to 1921, when Charlotte, now a young woman, is chosen to go to Russia as a Red Cross nurse, because she can speak both French and Russian. Years pass with only the description of wartime hardship and the images of the countless mutilated soldiers that fall under Charlotte's care. Charlotte decides to return to the town of her childhood, Boyarsk, to see the fate of the izba where she and her mother once lived. She comes across an old grizzled woman living there only to find that it is her mother. When Charlotte tries to take her and leave Russia, the authorities of Boyarsk seize her papers and refuse to return them. Mother and daughter barely survive the winter. In May, fearing starvation, Albertine and Charlotte flee the town and begin working on a Siberian farm. Albertine dies two years later. Soon after that, Charlotte marries a Russian man named Fyodor and they settle in the Uzbek town of Bukhara.

Coming back to the present, the children listen to more of Charlotte's dreamy stories of France through her "Siberian suitcase" filled with newspaper clippings. She talks of royalty, of President Félix Faure dying in the arms of his mistress, of restaurants, revolutions, etc. Back in his house, the narrator overhears his parents and other relatives talking of Charlotte. Because he is fourteen years old now, they tolerate his presence as they plunge into the details of Fyodor's arrest.

Fyodor was dressed in the red outfit of Father Christmas to entertain his children on New Year's Eve when he was arrested. Although the reason is fuzzy, it is implied that it was partially because of Charlotte's "crime" of being French. Thus, Fyodor was suspected of spying for the French. He is eventually released and forced to move across the country, in a small city in the annexed Poland. One week later, he goes to Moscow supposedly temporarily, in order to be reinstated into the Party, however Charlotte never sees him again until four years later, after the war.

A short time after Fyodor's disappearance, Germans bomb the city where Charlotte and her children are staying. As they manage to flee on the last train out of the city, Charlotte realizes that she brought with her the "Siberian suitcase" rather than the suitcase of warm clothes and food she had packed that morning. By chance, this suitcase becomes the last physical link between Charlotte and her life in France.

She and the children settle in a town 100 km away from the front line. She works again as a nurse, caring for the wounded soldiers fourteen hours a day. In the midst of this constant presence of dying soldiers, Charlotte receives a letter informing her of Fyodor's death on the front. Soon after, she receives a second note of death, which ironically gives her hope that her husband is actually alive. Fyodor indeed returns to her after Japan's defeat in September 1945. Less than a year later, he dies of his wounds.

Back to the present, the young narrator searches hungrily for all the information in his city about France. His obsession with France and the past alienates him from his classmates, making him a loner. Taunted and teased by his peers, he bonds with another loner nicknamed Pashka.

The next summer, the narrator returns alone to Saranza, because his sister is now studying in Moscow. His fifteenth year marks the deterioration of his relationship with Charlotte. He is no longer that innocent little boy who felt the "magic" of Charlotte's stories. He becomes angry at Charlotte's retelling of the past, confused between this past and the harsh Russia he lives in. At the very end of August, only a few days before his departure from Saranza, he mends his bond with Charlotte. All of a sudden he realizes the beauty of this French past, and he and Charlotte understand each other again.

Back in his hometown, the narrator's mother goes to the hospital for some tests. The teenage boy is reveling in the freedom of his mother's absence, only to be struck by her sudden death. In February, only a few months later, his father Nikolai dies too, of a heart attack. It is not his parents' deaths, but his aunt's arrival that changes his outlook on life. His aunt is a tough, no-nonsense, resourceful woman who teaches him to love Russia. Through her, he sees the harshness, the violence, and the darkness of Russia, yet he loves it still. As he says on page 144, "The blacker the Russia I was discovering turned out to be, the more violent my attachment became." As he moves closer to his Russian heritage, he pushes away the French.

As soon as he embraces his Russian identity, he becomes accepted by the peers that once scorned him. His "Frenchness" now turns into a gift, as he entertains his classmates with anecdotes about France. However, this alienates him from Pashka. In the cruel world of teenagers, he now openly scorns Pashka to gain the others' acceptance.

It is on the Mountain of Joy, the mountain hideaway where all the teenagers go to dance and flirt, that the narrator has his first experience of "physical love." It is a very awkward encounter, and he is further humiliated when his classmates make fun of him for not knowing "how to make love". It seems to the narrator that his "French implant" has made him an outcast, even among women. Without warning he takes a train to Saranza to put an end to this French nuisance.

Despite the boy's anger, when he abruptly arrives at Saranza, Charlotte is calm and undisturbed. She starts talking about the things she saw during the war. On a walk outside the town, she addresses the narrator as "Alyosha" and tells him that even after all of her years in Russia, she still can't seem to understand her adopted country; its harshness still seems foreign. Yet at the same time, she understands it more than the Russians, for she has seen the solitude of that country and its people. As the narrator walks back to Saranza with his grandmother, he feels as though the Russian and French within him now live in peace, put to rest by Charlotte's words.

Charlotte and her grandson spend their last summer together in peace. They walk down to the banks of the Sumra every day and read underneath the shade, speaking in French, talking about everything. Charlotte tells him how she was raped in her youth. She was in the desert when a young Uzbek man forced her down. After the rape, he tried to shoot her in the head, but it only grazed her temple. Left to die out in the desert, she survived thanks to a saiga, a desert antelope, which warmed her with its body heat and led her to a lake, where unknown travelers found her the next day. It was the rape that produced the narrator's Uncle Sergei, but Charlotte explains that she and Fyodor loved and accepted him as their first-born son.

Ten years later, the narrator, now aged twenty-five, briefly visits Charlotte again. He is about to go abroad for two weeks, and it is implied he plans to use this trip in order to defect to Europe. He jokingly asks Charlotte to come to France with him. Despite France meaning the world to her, she calmly refuses. From the sadness in her voice, the narrator understands "what France meant to her" (page 204).

Now it is twenty years after his last summer in Saranza, and the narrator is roughly thirty-five. As the Soviet Union is falling, his career as a Russian broadcaster at Radio Free Europe comes to an end, and he begins to wander aimlessly throughout Europe. As soon as he becomes used to the routine of a place, its sights, smells, and sounds, he is compelled to leave it. He begins to have fleeting thoughts of suicide, as a way out of routine.

Amidst this mental distress he settles in a small apartment in Paris. One day, he comes down with a fever and drifts in and out of reality, eventually making a temporary home inside a family tomb in a cemetery. After feverishly wondering like a madman through Paris, he collapses by the river and sees a plaque inscribed with the words "Flood Level - January 1910". This plaque brings back a flood of memories of France and his Russian summers, but most importantly, it reminds him of Charlotte. He is struck by the desire to write about her and begins a book titled "Charlotte Lemonnier: Biographical Notes". He also starts nursing the hope of bringing Charlotte back to France one day.

Three years later, he has published several books. His first works sat unsold because he wrote them in French, which prompted the critics to reject them as a Russian immigrant's attempt to use their language. However, once he claimed that he wrote them in Russian and had them translated into French, the critics hailed his novels. Thus, the narrator has written himself out of poverty and is now prepared to find Charlotte and bring her back to France. Alex Bond, a Russian businessman that he sent to Saranza, returns and tells him that his grandmother is alive and well. The only thing preventing him from going to Russia to get her is the lack of a French passport.

As soon as he applies for the passport, he decides that in order to welcome Charlotte to France he must decorate his apartment with antiques that might make her feel more at home. He moves into a larger apartment with a lovely view, and buys her books that may remind her of the Paris of the past. Soon he has overspent his income, yet he is happily anticipating her arrival.

As he finishes these preparations, he is eagerly waiting for the passport, in order to leave for Saranza. However, the Préfecture de Police sends him a letter of rejection. He writes for an appeal, but the months slip by until it is August. By this time it has been a year since Alex Bond's trip to Saranza. A man named Val Grig travels to Paris to deliver a package to the narrator. He informs him that Charlotte Lemonnier died on September 9 of the previous year. His grandmother had actually died only a few short weeks after Alex Bond had visited her, meaning that everything the narrator did, everything he bought was in vain.

The narrator sadly realizes that it was not the rejection of the passport that annulled his reunion with Charlotte, it was time. He begins reading the letter his grandmother sent him. It is the story of a woman from the Stalinist period who was accused of anti-communist propaganda and placed in a women's camp. In the camp, the woman is raped and gives birth to a boy. However, when the child is very young she is crushed by a tractor and dies in a hospital where Charlotte received permission to see her. Then, confused, the narrator reads the last sentence. Charlotte wrote that this woman was his mother, Maria Stepanovna Dolina. This woman, the narrator's biological mother, wanted to keep this secret from him for as long as possible.

In two days time, the narrator leaves his apartment and all of the items he had bought for Charlotte behind. As he walks through the dusty Paris streets he thinks of another memory to add to his Notes. It is that of him and Charlotte wandering through a forest full of rusting weaponry. In the middle of a clearing grew a grapevine, which caused Charlotte unimaginable joy: it was a reminder of her France.

The novel ends with the narrator looking at the picture of his real mother that Charlotte gave him and trying to get used to the idea that she was his mother. His thoughts drift to Charlotte's presence filling the streets of Paris as he searches for the words to tell her story.

== Critical reception ==
Emer Duff of The Dublin Quarterly International Literary Review said that the novel, "reads like an autobiography and one suspects that many of the beautifully drawn characters are perhaps people from Makine's own life."

Evidence for the author using parts of his own life in the novel is how both he and the narrator published their books. As Victor Brombert said in the New York Times, "It is therefore ironic that in order to have his first books published in Paris he had to pretend they were translations from Russian manuscripts. French publishers simply could not believe that a recently arrived emigré could write so well in their language." It is no coincidence that the same thing happened to the narrator of the story.
