= The Archipelago of Another Life =

2016 novel by Andreï Makine

- Author: Andreï Makine
- Original title: L'Archipel d'une autre vie
- Translator: Geoffrey Strachan
- Language: French
- Publisher: Éditions du Seuil
- Publication date: 18 August 2016
- Publication place: France
- English publication date: 11 July 2019
- Pages: 228
- ISBN: 9782021329179

The Archipelago of Another Life (French: L'Archipel d'une autre vie) is a 2016 novel by the French-Russian writer Andreï Makine.

== Plot ==
The novel is about a prisoner who escaped from a Gulag in Siberia at the end of the Stalin era. The story is told by one of the members of the search party years later. His listener is a young man who encounters him at Tugur.

== Reception ==
Julian Evans of The Daily Telegraph wrote that the novel is reminiscent of the works of Joseph Conrad and a step away from Makine's usual minimalist and emotional style. He wrote that the last quarter of the novel is moving but that the language in the English translation occasionally is stiff and creates "emotional ponderousness".

The English translation was shortlisted for the Scott Moncrieff Prize.
