= My Armenian Friend =

2021 novel by Andreï Makine

- Author: Andreï Makine
- Original title: L'ami arménien
- Translator: Geoffrey Strachan
- Language: French
- Publisher: Éditions Grasset
- Publication date: 6 January 2021
- Publication place: France
- English publication date: 3 October 2023
- Pages: 216
- ISBN: 9782246826576

My Armenian Friend (French: L'ami arménien) is a 2021 novel by the French-Russian writer Andreï Makine. It is about the friendship between a 13-year-old Russian boy and a one-year older Armenian at an orphanage in Siberia in the late 1960s.

The book was awarded the Prix des romancières of the Forum du livre de Saint-Louis.
