= 99 Francs (film) =

2007 film by Jan Kounen

- Theatrical release poster
- Directed by: Jan Kounen
- Screenplay by: Nicolas & Bruno; Jan Kounen
- Based on: 99 Francs by Frédéric Beigbeder
- Produced by: Ilan Goldman
- Starring: Jean Dujardin; Jocelyn Quivrin; Patrick Mille; Vahina Giocante; Elisa Tovati; Nicolas Marié; Frédéric Beigbeder; Dominique Bettenfeld
- Cinematography: David Ungaro
- Edited by: Anny Danché
- Music by: Jean-Jacques Hertz; François Roy
- Production companies: Film 99 Francs; Pathé; Arte France Cinéma
- Distributed by: Pathé Distribution
- Release date: 26 September 2007 (France)
- Running time: 99 minutes
- Country: France
- Language: French
- Budget: $12.5 million
- Box office: $13.4 million

99 Francs is a 2007 French satirical comedy-drama film directed by Jan Kounen from a screenplay he co-wrote with Nicolas & Bruno, based on the 2000 novel of the same name by Frédéric Beigbeder. The film stars Jean Dujardin. It released in France on 26 September 2007.

== Plot ==
The film is a satire on the modern advertisement business. The plot mainly concerns the story of a commercial advertisement designer, Octave Parango, who has an easy-going, highly paid job, and an active free life mainly consisting of drugs and random one-time sexual encounters. However, he starts growing weary of his job, and after having his first ever long-time relationship with fellow worker Sophie fail miserably, he organises a revolt against the advertisement business and his own life.

== Cast ==
- Jean Dujardin as Octave Parango
- Jocelyn Quivrin as Charles 'Charlie' Dagout
- Patrick Mille as Jean-François 'Jeff' Marolles
- Vahina Giocante as Sophie
- Elisa Tovati as Tamara
- Nicolas Marié as Alfred Duler
- Frédéric Beigbeder as badman
- Dominique Bettenfeld as Jean-Christian Gagnant
