= Music of a Life =

2001 novella by Andreï Makine

- First English edition
- Author: Andreï Makine
- Original title: La Musique d'une vie
- Translator: Geoffrey Strachan
- Language: French
- Publisher: Éditions du Seuil (France); Arcade Books (UK)
- Publication date: 2001
- Publication place: France
- Pages: 132
- ISBN: 9782020483438

Music of a Life (French: La Musique d'une vie) is a 2001 novella by the French writer Andreï Makine. A tale of Soviet oppression, it tells the story of a talented Russian piano player who has to abandon his career right before his first concert, flees to the countryside and adopts the identity of a dead soldier.

== Reception ==
Publishers Weekly wrote: "It's a simple story, but Makine's lovely lyric writing—excellently translated—in which the scenes are imagined with a sharply cinematic focus, gives it considerable depth and emotion; the quiet ending, back in the present time, is wrenching."

The book was awarded the Grand prix RTL-Lire.
