= The Woman Who Waited =

2004 novel by Andreï Makine

- Author: Andreï Makine
- Original title: La femme qui attendait
- Translator: Geoffrey Strachan
- Language: French
- Publisher: Éditions du Seuil
- Publication date: 1 January 2004
- Publication place: France
- English publication date: 1 March 2006
- Pages: 216
- ISBN: 9782020637435

The Woman Who Waited (French: La femme qui attendait) is a 2004 novel by the French writer Andreï Makine. It is set in the 1970s and tells the story of a 26-year-old man who falls in love with a woman who still is faithful to her fiancé who went missing in World War II.

== Reception ==
Elena Seymenliyska of The Guardian called the novel "achingly beautiful" and described it as "rich in symbolism and swathed in enigmatic lyricism". The New York Times' Andrey Slivka called it "an entertaining story about love, the onset of maturity, the moral complications of cultural dissidence and Soviet life as it was lived in a northern corner of the empire", and wrote that it "manages to treat its themes in a beautifully readable manner". Publishers Weekly wrote that Makine "transforms a very simple premise into a richly textured story of love and loss".

The book received the 2005 Prince Pierre Literary Prize.
