= Among the Lost =

2015 novel by Emiliano Monge

- First edition
- Author: Emiliano Monge
- Original title: Las tierras arrasadas
- Translator: Frank Wynne
- Cover artist: Jo Thomson
- Publisher: Scribe
- Publication date: 2015
- Publication place: Mexico City
- English publication date: 2018
- Pages: 345
- ISBN: 9781947534797
- Preceded by: Morirse de memoria

Among the Lost (Spanish: Las tierras arrasadas) is a 2015 novel by Mexican author Emiliano Monge.

The novel is a love story between two human traffickers set in the jungles and wastelands of the Mexican–US border area. Eileen Battersby, writing for The Guardian, said "Monge balances the dour, apocalyptic brutality of Cormac McCarthy with lively, grim humour – evident in the exasperated exchanges – all of which makes the stark truths driving this flamboyant narrative a little easier to swallow".

The novel was translated into English by Frank Wynne and published by Scribe.

== Plot and characters ==
The two main characters, Estela and Epitafio ("about the weirdest variation of Romeo and Juliet yet to emerge anywhere"), are former orphans who engage in human trafficking, gathering (and brutalizing) people who have fled their countries to sell them. Epitafio is forcibly married to another woman on orders of Father Nicho, the priest who runs the orphanage where they were dumped; Estela and he carry on a love affair mostly per cell phone as they ferry their loads of human cargo through an unnamed border area, with the orphanage as one of the central points. Father Nicho, who runs part of their operation, is planning to get rid of Epitafio and install a younger protégé, Sepelio, in his place. Other characters are a 14- and a 16-year-old boy, "sons of the jungle", who guide groups of refugees through the jungle and steal their possessions. One of the refugees, a "giant" former boxer whom Epitafio names Mausoleo, is saved from the group to become complicit in the operation, enforcing Epitafio's violent rule and killing two men early in the novel – he crushes a young refugee boy to death because he wouldn't obey Epitafio's command for him to keep quiet. His "inner struggle" is, according to one critic, the novel's "one true moral conflict".

The novel's structure, according to Daniel Hahn, engages the readers and compromises them: "Estela and Epitafio are our main anchors, their experiences and relationship driving the story's developments, but these magnetic central characters are people-traffickers and kidnappers, capable of startling violence and dehumanising cruelty" – as readers become invested in them, they thus align themselves with the two.

== Style ==
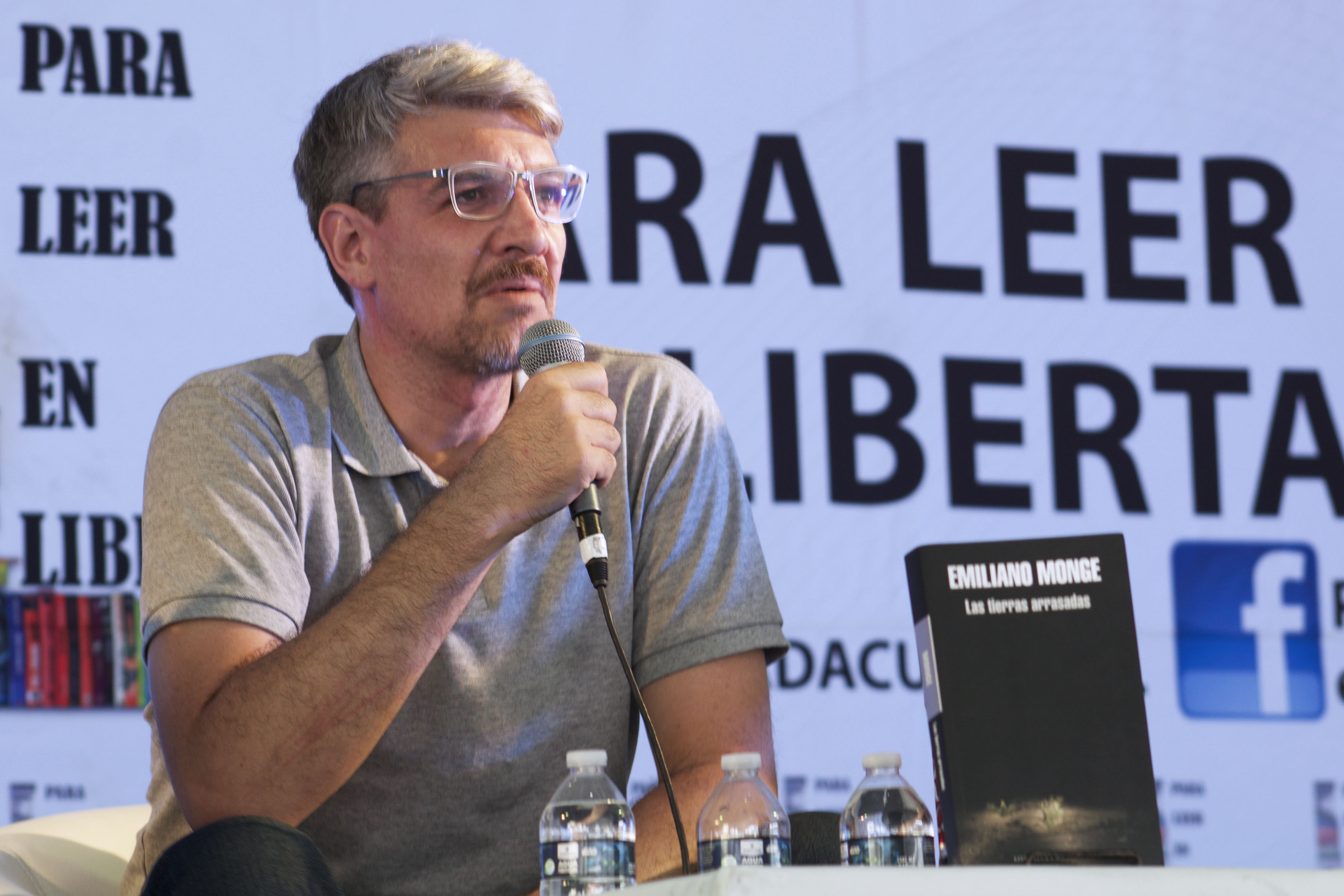
Emiliano Monge discussing his book, "Las Tierras arrasadas" (translated as "Among the Lost") in 2016

Monge's prose is larded with quotes (in italics) from Dante's Inferno and from the testimony of migrants from Central America on their way to the United States. He uses a "combination of slang and high literary diction". Lily Meyer, who reviewed the book for NPR, commented on the stylistic choices and their structural importance:

Monge borrows Dante's language to describe Estela and Epitafio's nameless victims, and uses the real-life testimonies to give his fictional migrants a voice. They interrupt the traffickers throughout the novel, functioning as a Greek chorus. Alongside Monge's elevated language and his habit of giving characters Homeric epithets as well as names, the testimonies transform Among the Lost into a 21st-century epic of sorts.

Hahn says those quotes are "destabilising" and mark the existence of "the timeless, nameless, undifferentiated creatures in the trucks", and praises the novel for "the acrobatic leaps in register, between richly poetic and spat-out visceral expletive, somehow remaining all of a piece". In addition, Hahn remarks on the narrative technique, which can move from one place and plot line to another with great speed: "The jumps between strands of the story often happen mid-sentence, a neat trick that just adds to the pull this book exerts on its readers". Characters are shown to come from a set of meaningful and often traumatic experiences, even if Monge does not always fully explain:

Emiliano Monge is perfectly happy to expose his readers to the unexplained, with stretches of dialogue whose meaning is clear to the characters but not, initially, to us. Everybody has a haunting past we don't know about, which seeps in gradually through their memories.

Lily Meyer came to a different appreciation of these differences in register. She finds it successful "on a linguistic level", and that the "collaging works flawlessly": Monge "is expert at shifting from high language to low". But reserving "beautiful prose for the disenfranchised" also entails a risk – the "gamble" pays off, she says, but "it might have distracted him from his moral questions a bit too much... Why should we care about Estela and Epitafio's love story? Like most of Monge's characters, the answer gets lost".

== Critical response ==
Reviewers were positive. Daniel Hahn called it a "fine novel" and praised its style and narrative technique, calling Monge "one of the most talented and interesting young novelists writing from today's Mexico". Lily Meyer praised the language and structure: the writing is "beautiful, fast-paced, and completely his [Monge's] own". Eileen Battersby, who wrote the "atmospheric novel is alive with Shakespearean echoes and grim humour", praised plot and language, and concluded "Monge balances the dour, apocalyptic brutality of Cormac McCarthy with lively, grim humour – evident in the exasperated exchanges – all of which makes the stark truths driving this flamboyant narrative a little easier to swallow". She also praised the translation, saying "the ferocious eloquence of his [Monge's] prose... has been magnificently well served by translator Frank Wynne's Miltonic register".
