= Nouvelles sous ecstasy =

1999 short story collection by Frédéric Beigbeder

- Author: Frédéric Beigbeder
- Language: French
- Publisher: Éditions Gallimard
- Publication date: 12 March 1999
- Publication place: France
- Pages: 112
- ISBN: 9782070755233

Nouvelles sous ecstasy (lit. 'Short Stories under Ecstasy') is a 1999 short story collection by the French writer Frédéric Beigbeder.

== Contents ==
The short stories were, as the title indicates, written under the influence of the drug MDMA, also known as ecstasy. The book was edited by Philippe Sollers. It opens with a warning from Beigbeder:

The author of this book doesn't take it anymore, and advises the reader not to try: not only is ecstasy illegal, but it also damages the brain, as proved by this collection of texts written under the influence. Also, do we really need a pill to make us tell our life story to strangers? Don't we already have literature for that?

—

The book contains the following stories:

- "Spleen à l'aéroport de Roissy-Charles-de-Gaulle"
- "Un texte démodé"
- "Le jour où j'ai plu aux filles"
- "La première gorgée d'ecstasy"
- "Manuscrit trouvé à Saint-Germain-des-Prés"
- "Le cafard après la fête"
- "L'homme qui regardait les femmes, 1"
- "Comment devenir quelqu'un"
- "Le Plus Grand Ecrivain Français Vivant"
- "La nouvelle la plus dégueulasse de ce recueil"
- "L'homme qui regardait les femmes, 2"
- "Extasy À Go-Go"
- "La première nouvelle d'« Easy Reading »"
- "La solitude à plusieurs"

== Reception ==
Marie Gobin of L'Express wrote that the book is characterised by joyful self-mockery and self-esteem, describing it as fierce, raw, decadent and offbeat. She wrote that although Beigbeder advises readers to not try ecstasy, it is possible to "taste it" through the book.

In the academic edited volume Literature and Intoxication, Russell Williams stresses that the Beigbeder who presents himself in the book must be understood at least partially as an author persona. Williams compares the book to Charles Baudelaire's experiments with writing under drug influence, and with Beigbeder's comments in other books about how literature can work like a drug and reading can be an addiction.
