= Tomás González (writer) =

Colombian writer (born 1950)

Tomás González (born 1950 in Medellín) is a Colombian writer. He studied philosophy at the National University of Colombia. He is best known for his debut novel In the Beginning Was the Sea (1983) which was translated into English by Frank Wynne and published by Pushkin Press. The translation was shortlisted for the Independent Foreign Fiction Prize. In 2025, he won the Manuel Rojas Ibero-American Narrative Award.

González lived in the United States for twenty years before returning to his native Colombia in 2002.

He is the nephew of the writer Fernando Gonzalez.

== Selected bibliography ==
- In the Beginning Was the Sea, translated by Frank Wynne (Pushkin Press)
- Difficult Light, (La Luz Dificíl) translated by Andrea Rosenberg (Archipelago Books, 2016)
- The Storm, translated by Andrea Rosenberg (Archipelago Books, 2018)
- Fog at Noon (Niebla al mediodía) translated by Andrea Rosenberg (Archipelago Books, 2024)
