= Mémoires d'un jeune homme dérangé =

1990 novel by Frédéric Beigbeder

- 2001 edition
- Author: Frédéric Beigbeder
- Language: French
- Publisher: Éditions de la Table ronde
- Publication date: 1990
- Publication place: France
- Pages: 150
- ISBN: 978-2-7103-0442-5

Mémoires d'un jeune homme dérangé (lit. 'Memoirs of a deranged young man') is the debut novel of the French writer Frédéric Beigbeder, published in 1990.

== Background ==
Beigbeder wrote Mémoires d'un jeune homme dérangé when he was 24 years old, after Denis Tillinac, then CEO of Éditions de la Table ronde, asked if he had written any novel. According to Beigbeder, he quickly put together the notes that formed the basis for the largely autobiographical novel.

== Plot ==
Marc Marronnier is a young man who parties a lot. He falls in love, which has negative consequences for him.

== Reception ==
Roland Jaccard of Le Monde asked if Mémoires d'un jeune homme dérangé was "the most snobbish novel of the year?" and wrote that Beigbeder has written a "boy meets girl" story in a simultaneously "terse and incomplete style".
