= Tropic of Violence =

2016 novel by Nathacha Appanah

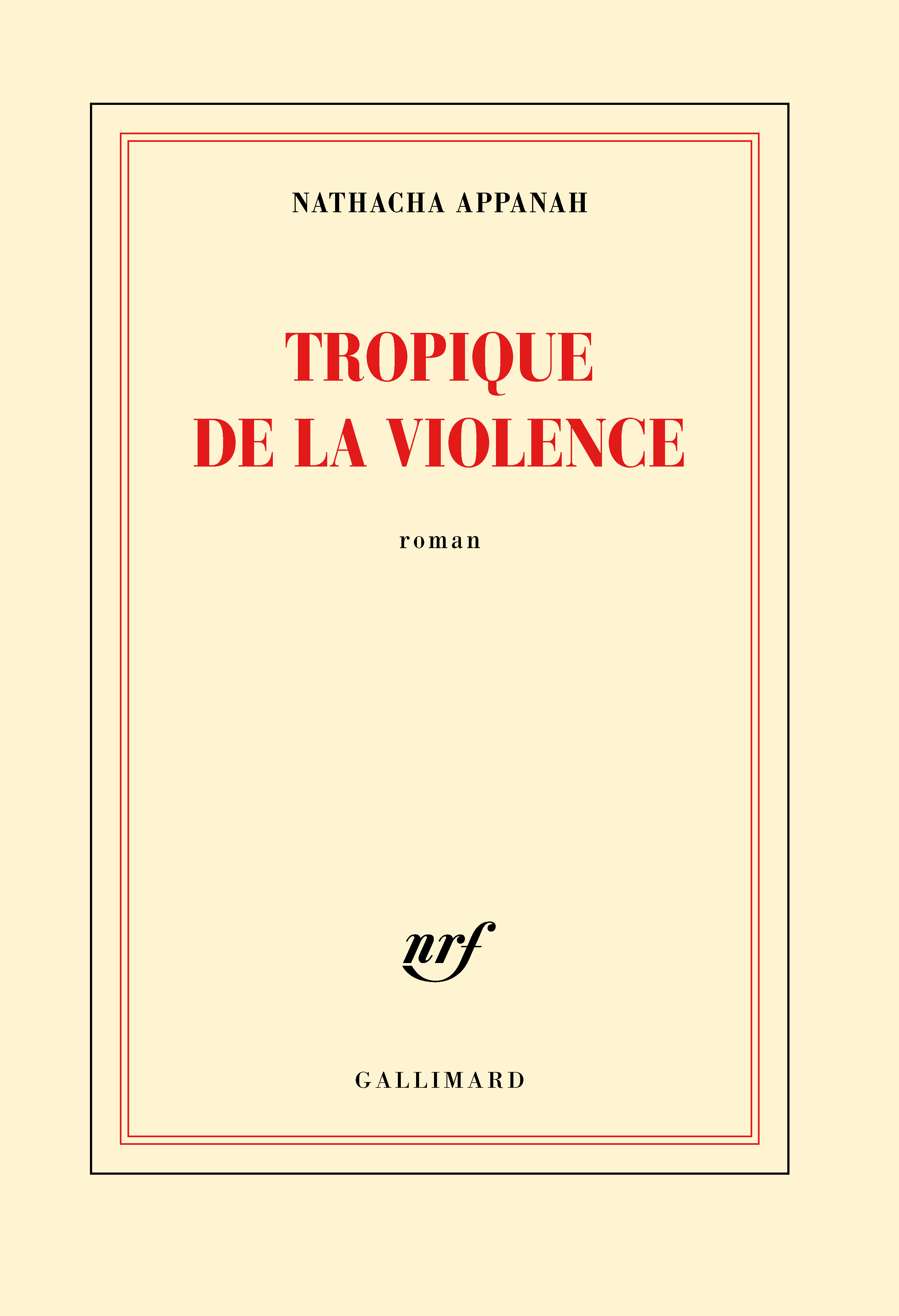
- First edition (Collection Blanche)
- Author: Nathacha Appanah
- Original title: Tropique de la violence
- Translator: Geoffrey Strachan
- Language: French
- Set in: Mayotte
- Publisher: Gallimard
- Publication date: 25 August 2016
- Publication place: France
- English publication date: 2018
- Media type: Print
- Pages: 174
- ISBN: 978-2-07-019755-2
- OCLC: 952800225
- LC Class: PQ2703.L49 A66 2016

Tropic of Violence (French: Tropique de la violence) is a 2016 novel by Nathacha Appanah. First published by Éditions Gallimard in 2016, it was awarded the Prix du roman métis des lycéens in 2017.
