= A French Novel =

2009 novel by Frédéric Beigbeder

- Author: Frédéric Beigbeder
- Original title: Un roman français
- Translator: Frank Wynne
- Language: French
- Publisher: Éditions Grasset
- Publication date: 19 August 2009
- Publication place: France
- English publication date: 18 July 2013
- Pages: 288
- ISBN: 9782246734192

A French Novel (French: Un roman français) is a 2009 novel by the French writer Frédéric Beigbeder. It was awarded the Prix Renaudot.

== Plot ==
An autobiographical novel, the starting point of A French Novel is an incident on 28 January 2008, when Frédéric Beigbeder was arrested for snorting cocaine outside a nightclub in Paris. As he is incarcerated by the police for two days, he reflects on his childhood, his grandfather, the divorce of his parents, the characters of his father and brother, his early infatuations, and the France of the 1960s and 1970s he grew up in.

== Reception ==
A French Novel received the Prix Renaudot in 2009.

Sylvia Brownrigg of The Guardian said the book is amusing and Beigbeder entertains the reader with a mix of highbrow and lowbrow cultural references, including Gustave Flaubert, Louis-Ferdinand Céline, foie gras, Jack Bauer, Absolutely Fabulous and Carambar, and walks "a fine line between self-pity and self-awareness". Ivan Juritz of The Independent called it "striking in its lack of bravado" and said it can be read as a commentary on Beigbeder's other novels.
