= Windows on the World (novel) =

Novel written by Frédéric Beigbeder

- First edition (publ. Grasset)
- Author: Frédéric Beigbeder
- Original title: Windows on the World
- Language: French
- Publisher: Grasset
- Publication date: 2003
- Publication place: France

Windows on the World is a novel written by Frédéric Beigbeder, and was first published in France in 2003, depicting the last moment of fictional victims in the Windows on the World restaurant atop the World Trade Center’s North Tower on the morning of the September 11 attacks in 2001. An English translation of the novel by Frank Wynne was released on March 30, 2005 by Miramax Books.

== Plot summary ==
The novel alternates between two voices: the first being Carthew Yorsten, a Texan realtor accompanied by his two sons (ages 7 and 9) who are having a tourist-style breakfast at Windows on the World restaurant on the 107th floor of the World Trade Center’s North Tower on September 11, 2001; the second, the voice of the author writing the story while having breakfast at a restaurant atop Tour Montparnasse, a Paris skyscraper. Each chapter, averaging three pages apiece, represents one minute from 8:30am – just before the time the building is hit by American Airlines Flight 11 at 8:46am – to 10:29, just after its collapse at 10:28am.

== Prizes ==
The novel won the Prix Interallié in 2003.

It won the 2005 Independent Prize for Foreign Fiction.

Independent literary editor and judge Boyd Tonkin said: "Frederic Beigbeder's winning novel pulls off the impossible - it creates fiction about the tragedy of 11 September and our responses to it,"

== See also ==
- List of cultural references to the September 11 attacks
