= Andreï Makine =

French novelist (born 1957)

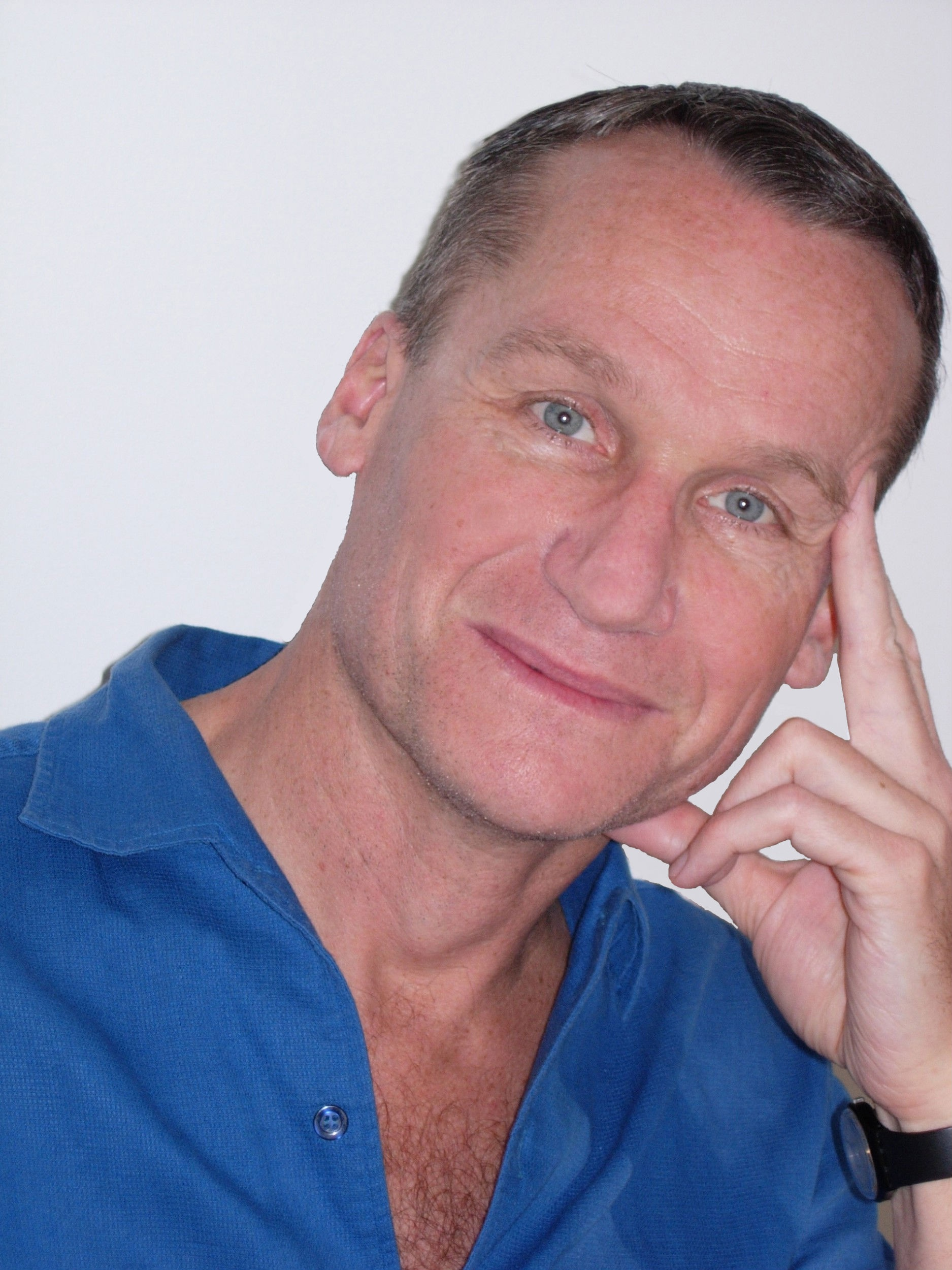
- Andreï Makine in 2013
- Born: 10 September 1957 (age 68); Krasnoyarsk, Russian SFSR
- Education: Moscow State University
- Occupation: Novelist
- Known for: Member of the Académie Française

Andreï Yaroslavovich Makine (Russian: Андрей Ярослáвович Макин, romanized: Andrey Yaroslavovich Makin; born 10 September 1957) is a French novelist. He also publishes under the pseudonym Gabriel Osmonde. Makine's novels include Dreams of My Russian Summers (1995) which won two top French awards, the Prix Goncourt and the Prix Médicis. He was elected to seat 5 of the Académie Française on 3 March 2016, succeeding Assia Djebar.

== Biography ==
Andreï Makine was born in Krasnoyarsk, Russian SFSR, Soviet Union on 10 September 1957 and grew up in the city of Penza about 700 kilometres (435 mi) south-east of Moscow. As a boy, having acquired familiarity with France and its language from his French-born grandmother, he wrote poems in both French and his native Russian.

In 1987, he went to France as a member of a teacher's exchange program and decided to stay. He was granted political asylum and was determined to make a living as a writer in French. However, Makine had to present his first manuscripts as translations from Russian to overcome publishers' skepticism that a newly arrived exile could write so fluently in a second language. After disappointing reactions to his first two novels, it took eight months to find a publisher for his fourth, Dreams of My Russian Summers. Finally published in 1995 in France as Le testament français, the novel became the first in history to win both the Prix Goncourt and the Prix Médicis plus the Prix Goncourt des Lycéens.

In 2001 Makine began secretively publishing as "Gabriel Osmonde", a total of four novels over ten years, the last appearing in 2011. It was considered a mystery among France's literary subculture; many speculated about who Osmonde might be until, in 2011, a scholar noticed Osmonde's book 20,000 femmes dans la vie d'un homme seemed to have been inspired by Makine's Dreams of My Russian Summers. Makine confirmed that he was Osmonde. Explaining why he used a pseudonym, he said, "I wanted to create someone who lived far from the hurly-burly of the world".

== Translations ==
All English translations of Makine's novels are by Geoffrey Strachan.

Le testament français was published in English as Dreams of My Russian Summers in the United States, and under its original French title in the United Kingdom. It has also been translated into Russian by Yuliana Yahnina and Natalya Shakhovskaya, and it was first published in Russian in 1996 in the 12th issue of Foreign Literature (Иностранная литература) literary magazine.

== Bibliography ==
- La Fille d'un héros de l'Union soviétique, 1990, Robert Laffont (A Hero's Daughter, 1996 ISBN 1-55970-687-2)
- Confession d'un porte-drapeau déchu, 1992, Belfond (Confessions of a Fallen Standard-Bearer, 1996 ISBN 1-55970-529-9)
- Au temps du fleuve Amour, 1994, Editions du Félin (Once Upon the River Love, 1996 ISBN 1-55970-438-1)
- Le Testament français, 1995, Mercure de France (Dreams of My Russian Summers, 1997 ISBN 1-55970-383-0; also published in English as Le Testament Francais)
- Le Crime d'Olga Arbelina, 1998, Mercure de France (Crime of Olga Arbyelina, 2000 ISBN 1-55970-494-2)
- Requiem pour l'Est, 2000, Mercure de France (Requiem for a Lost Empire, 2001 ISBN 1-55970-571-X)
- La Musique d'une vie, 2001, Éditions du Seuil (A Life's Music, 2004 ISBN 1-55970-637-6; also published as Music of a Life)
- La Terre et le ciel de Jacques Dorme, 2003, Mercure de France (The Earth and Sky of Jacques Dorme, 2005 ISBN 1-55970-739-9)
- La Femme qui attendait, 2004, Éditions du Seuil (The Woman Who Waited, 2006 ISBN 1-55970-774-7)
- L'Amour humain, 2006, Éditions du Seuil (Human Love, 2008 ISBN 0-340-93677-0)
- Le Monde selon Gabriel, 2007, Éditions du Rocher
- La Vie d'un homme inconnu, 2009, Éditions du Seuil (The Life of an Unknown Man, 2010 ISBN 0-340-99878-4)
- Cette France qu'on oublie d'aimer, 2010, Points
- Le Livre des brèves amours éternelles, 2011, Éditions du Seuil (Brief Loves That Live Forever, 2013 ISBN 0857051768)
- Une Femme Aimée, 2013, Éditions du Seuil (A woman loved, 2015)
- Le Pays du lieutenant Schreiber, 2014
- L'archipel d'une autre vie, 2016 (The Archipelago of Another Life, 2021)
- Au-delà des frontières, 2019
- L'Ami arménien, 2021, Éditions Grasset (My Armenian Friend, 2023 ISBN 2246826578)
- L'Ancien calendrier d'un amour, 2023, Éditions Grasset

As Gabriel Osmonde

- Le Voyage d'une femme qui n'avait plus peur de vieillir, Albin Michel, 2001
- Les 20 000 Femmes de la vie d'un homme, Albin Michel, 2004
- L'Œuvre de l'amour, Pygmalion, 2006
- Alternaissance, Pygmalion, 2011
