= Pascal Garnier =

Pascal Garnier (1949–2010) was a French writer, primarily known for his noir fiction.

Born in Paris, Garnier quit school without obtaining a high school diploma, and after a varied and nomadic life, he decided at the age of 35 to start writing. In 1986, he wrote his first book, L'Année sabbatique, a collection of short stories. Often likened to the work of Georges Simenon, his books have been translated into many languages. Gallic Books UK have translated a dozen of his crime novels into English. John Banville praised these titles in a laudatory review in the New York Review of Books.

Garnier died in the Ardeche region in 2010.

== Bibliography ==
French Publication	Original French title	English title / translation	English Publication
1996	La Solution esquimau	The Eskimo Solution	Transl. by Emily Boyce and Jane Aitken; Gallic Books, 2016
1997	La Place du mort	The Front Seat Passenger	Transl. by Jane Aitken; Gallic Books, 2014
1998	Les Insulaires	The Islanders	Transl. by Emily Boyce; Gallic Books, 2014
1999	Trop près du bord	Too Close to the Edge	Transl. by Emily Boyce; Gallic Books, 2016
1999	L'A26	The A26	Transl. by Melanie Florence; Gallic Books, 2013
2000	Chambre 12
2001	Nul n'est à l'abri du succès	C’est La Vie	Transl. by Jane Aitken; Gallic Books, 2019
2002	Les Nuisibles
2003	Les Hauts du bas	Low Heights	Transl. by Melanie Florence; Gallic Books, 2017
2004	Parenthèse
2005	Flux
2006	Comment va la douleur ?	How’s the Pain?	Transl. by Emily Boyce; Gallic Books, 2012
2008	La Théorie du panda	The Panda Theory	Transl. by Svein Clouston; Gallic Books, 2012
2009	Le Grand Loin	A Long Way Off	Transl. by Emily Boyce; Gallic Books, 2019
2009	Lune captive dans un œil mort	Moon in a Dead Eye	Transl. by Emily Boyce; Gallic Books, 2013
2012	Cartons	Boxes	Transl. by Melanie Florence; Gallic Books, 2014
