= Frank Wynne =

Irish literary translator and writer (born 1962)

- Born: 1962 (age 63–64); County Sligo, Ireland
- Occupations: Literary translator and writer
- Awards: Dublin Literary Award; Independent Foreign Fiction Prize; Scott Moncrieff Prize; Premio Valle-Inclán; CWA International Dagger; Republic of Consciousness Prize; French American Prize

Frank Wynne (born 1962) is an Irish literary translator and writer.

== Biography ==
Born in County Sligo in the west of Ireland, Frank Wynne worked as a comics editor at Fleetway and later at comic magazine Deadline. He worked for a time at AOL, before becoming a literary translator. He has translated many authors, including Michel Houellebecq, Boualem Sansal, Frédéric Beigbeder and the late Ivoirian novelist Ahmadou Kourouma.

He has twice jointly won the Dublin Literary Award: with Houellebecq for Atomised (his translation of Les Particules élémentaires); and with Alice Zeniter for The Art of Losing (his translation of L'Art de Perdre). His translation of Frédéric Beigbeder's Windows on the World, a novel set in the twin towers of the World Trade Center in New York during the September 11, 2001 attacks, won the 2005 Independent Foreign Fiction Prize.

Notably, he is a two-time winner of both the Scott Moncrieff Translation Prize for translation from the French (in 2008 for Frédéric Beigbeder's Holiday in a Coma and Love Lasts Three Years and in 2015 for Boualem Sansal's Harraga) and the Premio Valle Inclán for Spanish Translation (in 2011 for Marcelo Figueras's Kamchatka and in 2013 for Alonso Cueto's The Blue Hour).

Wynne's book I Was Vermeer, a biography of Han van Meegeren, was published by Bloomsbury in August 2006 and serialised as the BBC Radio 4 "Book of the Week" (read by Anton Lesser) in August 2006.

Wynne has edited two major anthologies for Head of Zeus: Found in Translation: 100 of the finest stories every translated, (2018) and the QUEER: LGBTQ Writing from Ancient Times to Yesterday (2021).

In 2021, it was announced that he would be the chair of the judging panel of the 2022 International Booker Prize – the first time a translator has chaired the panel.

Wynne has translated several books by Virginie Despentes, including King Kong Theory (2006, translated 2020).

== Selected translations ==
Date of translation is given

- Somewhere in a Desert (1998) by Dominique Sigaud (a New York Times notable book)
- Atomised (2001) by Michel Houellebecq
- Platform (2002) by Michel Houellebecq (adapted by Carnal Acts for the Institute of Contemporary Arts (ICA))
- Lanzarote (2003) by Michel Houellebecq
- Waiting for the Wild Beasts to Vote (2003) by Ahmadou Kourouma
- His Brother (2004) by Philippe Besson
- Windows on the World (2005) by Frédéric Beigbeder
- The Little Book of Philosophy (2005) by André Comte-Sponville
- Mammals (2006) by Pierre Mérot
- Allah is Not Obliged (2006) by Ahmadou Kourouma
- Working Knowledge by Petr Král (2008), Pushkin Press
- Forever Nude by Guy Goffette (2008)
- Banquet of Lies by Amin Zaoui (2008), Marion Boyars Publishers
- An Unfinished Business (2009) (published in the US as The German Mudjahid) by Boualem Sansal
- Journey to the Centre of the Earth (2009) by Jules Verne, Penguin Classics
- Kamchatka (2010) by Marcelo Figueras
- The Frozen Heart (2010) by Almudena Grandes
- What the Day Owes the Night (2010) by Yasmina Khadra
- The Blue Hour (2012) by Alonso Cueto (shortlisted for the 2013 Oxford-Weidenfeld Translation Prize)
- The Patagonian Hare : A Memoir (2012) by Claude Lanzmann (shortlisted for the 2013 French-American Florence Gould Translation Prize)
- In the Beginning Was the Sea (2014) by Tomás González
- Liveforever (2014) by Andrés Caicedo
- The Great Swindle (2015) [Au revoir là-haut] by Pierre Lemaitre
- Vernon Subutex 1 by Virginie Despentes (2017) (shortlisted for the Man Booker International Prize 2018)
- The Imposter (2017) by Javier Cercas (longlisted for the Man Booker International Prize 2018)
- Among the Lost (2018) [Las tierras arrasadas] by Emiliano Monge
- Animalia (2019) [Règne animal] by Jean-Baptiste Del Amo
- The Most Precious of Cargoes (2020) [La Plus Précieuse des marchandises] by Jean-Claude Grumberg
- The Art of Losing (2021) [L'Art de Perdre] by Alice Zeniter
- The Annual Banquet of the Gravedigger's Guild (2023) by Mathias Enard
- The Son of Man (2024) by Jean-Baptiste Del Amo
- Mafalda (2025) by Quino

== Awards ==
- 2002: Winner of the Dublin Literary Award for Atomised' by Michel Houellebecq
- 2005: Winner of the Independent Foreign Fiction Prize for Windows on the World by Frédéric Beigbeder
- 2008: Winner of the Scott Moncrieff Prize for the translation of Holiday in a Coma and Love Lasts Three Years by Frédéric Beigbeder
- 2012: Winner of the Premio Valle-Inclán for the translation of Kamchatka by Marcelo Figueras
- 2013: Joint winner of the CWA International Dagger for the translation of Alex by Pierre Lemaitre
- 2014: Winner of the CWA International Dagger for the translation of The Siege by Arturo Perez-Reverte
- 2014: Winner of the Premio Valle-Inclán for the translation of The Blue Hour by Alonso Cueto
- 2015: Winner of the CWA International Dagger for the translation of Camille by Pierre Lemaitre
- 2016: Winner of the Scott Moncrieff Prize for the translation of Harraga by Boualem Sansal
- 2020: Winner of the Republic of Consciousness Prize for the translation of Animalia by Jean-Baptiste del Amo
- 2022: Winner of the Dublin Literary Award for the translation of The Art of Losing, by Alice Zeniter
- 2023: Winner of the Scott Moncrieff Prize for the translation of “Standing Heavy” by Gauz
- 2024: Winner of the French American Prize for the translation of “The Annual Banquet of the Gravediggers Guild” by Mathias Énard
