= Titumate =

- Populated center
- Location in Chocó and Colombia Titumate (Colombia)
- Coordinates: 8°18′29.0″N 77°4′33.0″W
- Country: Colombia
- Department: Chocó
- Municipality: Unguía Municipality
- Elevation: 20 ft (6 m)

Population (2005)
  - Total: 303
- Time zone: UTC-5 (Colombia Standard Time)

Titumate is a populated center of Colombia in Unguía Municipality, Chocó Department in Colombia.

== Climate ==
Titumate has a tropical rainforest climate (Af) with heavy to very heavy rainfall year-round.

Climate data for Titumate
Month	Jan	Feb	Mar	Apr	May	Jun	Jul	Aug	Sep	Oct	Nov	Dec	Year
Mean daily maximum °C (°F)	29.9 (85.8)	30.0 (86.0)	30.3 (86.5)	30.5 (86.9)	29.7 (85.5)	30.0 (86.0)	29.9 (85.8)	29.9 (85.8)	29.7 (85.5)	29.4 (84.9)	29.5 (85.1)	29.8 (85.6)	29.9 (85.8)
Daily mean °C (°F)	26.0 (78.8)	26.1 (79.0)	26.5 (79.7)	26.6 (79.9)	26.1 (79.0)	26.2 (79.2)	26.1 (79.0)	26.1 (79.0)	25.9 (78.6)	25.9 (78.6)	26.0 (78.8)	25.9 (78.6)	26.1 (79.0)
Mean daily minimum °C (°F)	22.1 (71.8)	22.3 (72.1)	22.7 (72.9)	22.7 (72.9)	22.5 (72.5)	22.4 (72.3)	22.4 (72.3)	22.3 (72.1)	22.2 (72.0)	22.4 (72.3)	22.5 (72.5)	22.1 (71.8)	22.4 (72.3)
Average rainfall mm (inches)	118.9 (4.68)	91.8 (3.61)	112.1 (4.41)	358.6 (14.12)	393.8 (15.50)	332.1 (13.07)	422.0 (16.61)	385.3 (15.17)	323.9 (12.75)	285.1 (11.22)	307.7 (12.11)	238.9 (9.41)	3,370.2 (132.66)
Average rainy days	6	4	5	11	14	13	15	16	13	11	11	9	128
Source 1:
Source 2:
