= Jean-Baptiste Del Amo =

French writer (born 1981)

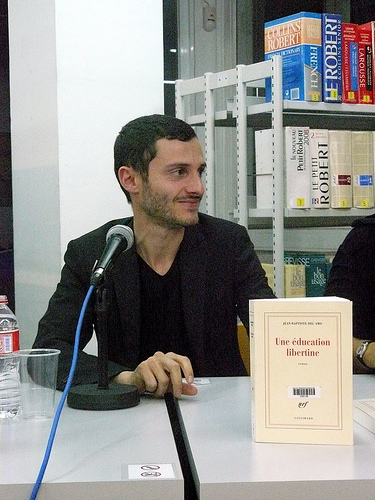
Jean-Baptiste Del Amo (2011)

Jean-Baptiste Garcia (born 25 November 1981), known by the pen name Jean-Baptiste Del Amo, is a French writer. He was born in Toulouse.

== Selected works ==
- Ne rien faire et autres nouvelles (2006).
- Une éducation libertine (2008). A Libertine Education
- Le Sel (2010). Salt
- Pornographia (2013).
- Règne animal (2016). Animalia, trans. Frank Wynne (2019)
- L214, une voix pour les animaux (2017). L214: A Voice for Animals
- Comme toi (2017).
- Le Fils de l'homme (2021). The Son of Man, trans. Frank Wynne (2024)

== Awards and honors ==
- Fénéon Prize (2008) for Une éducation libertine
- Prix Goncourt du Premier Roman (2009) for Une éducation libertine
- Prix Sade (2013) for Pornographia
- Prix du Livre Inter (2017) for Règne animal
- Prix du roman Fnac (2021) for Le Fils de l'homme
