= The Most Precious of Cargoes (novel) =

2019 novel by Jean-Claude Grumberg

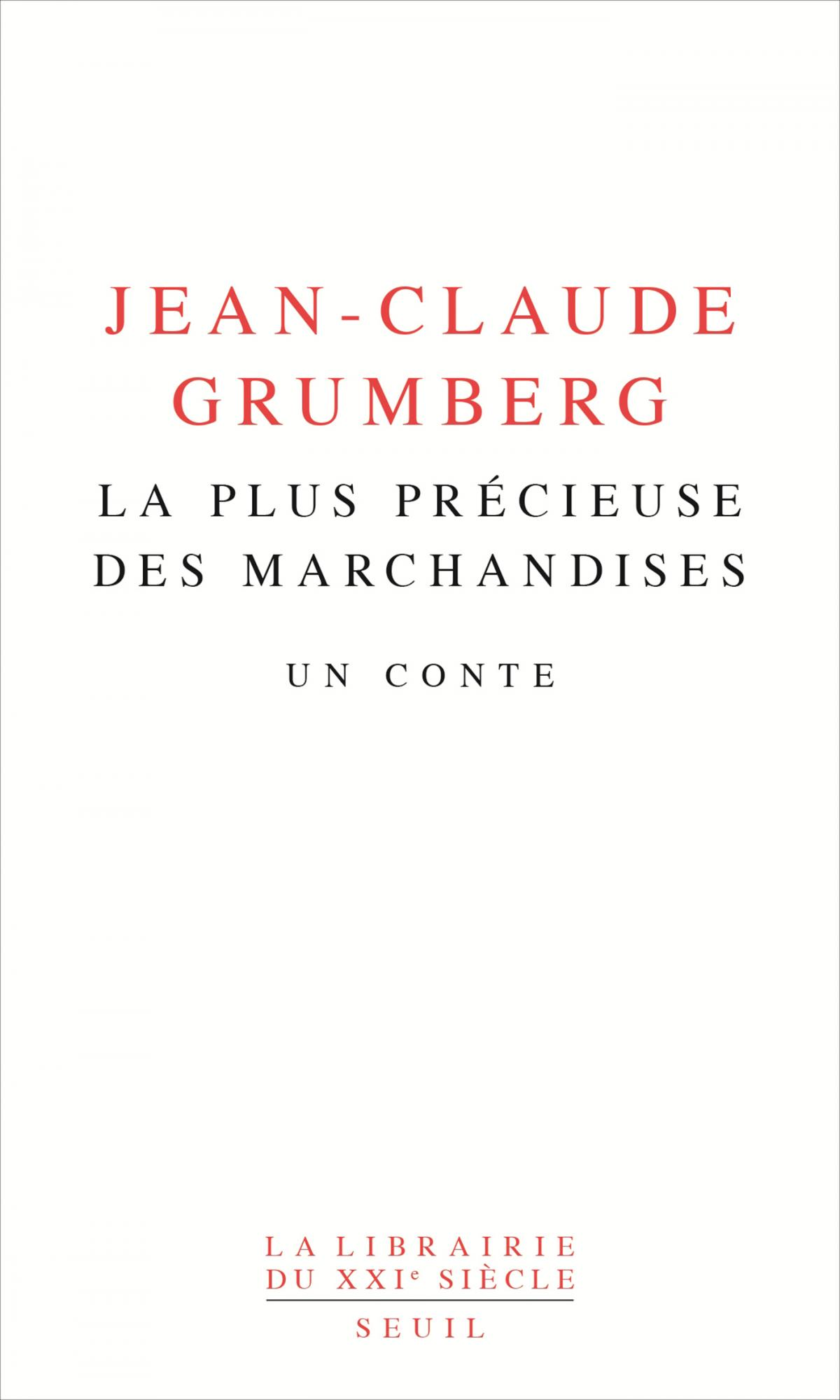
- La Librairie du xxi^{e} siècle cover (first edition)
- Author: Jean-Claude Grumberg
- Original title: La Plus Précieuse des marchandises
- Translator: Frank Wynne
- Language: French
- Publisher: Éditions du Seuil
- Publication date: 10 January 2019
- Publication place: Paris
- English publication date: 29 September 2020 (HarperVia)
- Media type: Print
- Pages: 128
- ISBN: 978-2-02-141419-6
- OCLC: 1083683760
- Dewey Decimal: 842/.914
- LC Class: PQ2667.R73 P5813 2020

The Most Precious of Cargoes: A Tale (French: La Plus Précieuse des marchandises : Un conte) is a novel by French author and playwright Jean-Claude Grumberg, published on 10 January 2019 by Éditions du Seuil. It is a postmodern fairy tale set during the Holocaust. It was translated into English by Frank Wynne, and published on 29 September 2020 by HarperVia.

== Plot ==
A Jewish family with two infants is deported on a freight train from the Drancy internment camp to the Auschwitz concentration camp in February 1943. The father of the twin children fears that his wife will not be able to feed both children with her milk, so he decides to throw one of them outside in the snow, wrapped in a prayer shawl.

It is there, deep in the Polish forest, that she is found by a woodcutter's wife, a kind, modest woman who likes to watch the messages and the shouts of people on the trains without knowing what is happening to them and who has always wanted to have a child. She sees the screaming child and its fine scarf as a gift from God - her "little cargo", as she calls it - and takes it home with her, where she has an argument with her husband. He realises that the child is Jewish, who he deems as a member of the "accursed race". He describes the parents as "heartless" and "the ones who killed God", and refuses to keep the child, not least because of the death penalty that threatens anyone who shelters a Jew. However, after his wife's earnest pleas, he allows her to keep the child.

Despite the rationing imposed during the war, the woman works to feed the child and raise it lovingly. From then on, she no longer observes the trains from which people had previously thrown pieces of paper at her, and does not ask herself what happened to the other people on the freight train, because she is too preoccupied with her newfound happiness.

== Epilogue ==
The novel concludes with a metafictional epilogue that directly addresses the reader's curiosity as to whether or not the narrative is a "true story". Grumberg affirms: "Of course not, absolutely not". However, this is immediately followed by a similarly absolute denial of the events of the Holocaust: "There were no cargo trains crossing war-torn continents to deliver urgently their oh-so-perishable cargo. No reunification camps, internment camps, concentration camps, or even extermination camps. No families were vaporized in smoke after their final journey. No hair was shorn, gathered, packaged, and shipped. There were no flames, no ashes, no tears." Steven G. Kellman wrote for Tablet, "Since we know that these genocidal horrors did occur, that—hard as it is to believe—there were in fact cargo trains that transported human beings to extermination camps, we are forced to read Grumberg's indelible 'fairy tale' as accurate history." Kirkus Reviews and the Los Angeles Review of Books assessed the epilogue as an appeal for the reader to question the relationships between storytelling and history, and between myth and truth.

The epilogue is followed by an appendix for "Lovers of True Stories" which states the numbers of the convoys on which the author's father and grandfather left, the number of people on board, and that of the survivors.

== Reception ==
In a starred review, Kirkus Reviews proclaimed, "It is difficult, in 2020, to write a work of fiction about the Holocaust that is original; even simply in this sense, Grumberg's work succeeds where many have failed." Raphaëlle Leyris of Le Monde wrote that the narrative's "acerbic tenderness for its characters prevents it from falling into simple pastiche".

== Film adaptation ==
An animated film adaptation of the same name was directed Michel Hazanavicius, who co-wrote the screenplay with Grumberg. The film, which features the voices of Dominique Blanc, Grégory Gadebois, Denis Podalydès and Jean-Louis Trintignant, was selected in the main competition at the 77th Cannes Film Festival.
