= 99 Francs (novel) =

2000 novel by Frédéric Beigbeder

- First edition
- Author: Frédéric Beigbeder
- Language: French
- Genre: Fiction
- Publisher: Grasset & Fasquelle
- Publication date: August 2000
- Publication place: France
- Media type: Print
- Pages: 282 pgs
- ISBN: 2-246-56761-0

99 Francs is a 2000 novel by French writer Frédéric Beigbeder. The book was released in France in August 2000 through Grasset & Fasquelle and has since been re-released under the titles € 14.99 and € 5.90. Shortly after the book's initial release Beigbeder was fired from his advertising job after his employers read 99 Francs.

In 2007 the book was adapted into a film by the same name that was directed by Jan Kounen and written by Nicolas & Bruno.

== Summary ==
The book follows Octave Parengo, a successful copywriter that appears to have it all. Not only is his job going well, but he has surrounded himself with expensive material goods, beautiful women, and much cocaine. That easygoing life ends when he becomes disillusioned with his life and his job after a meeting with a client.

== Reception ==
Jonathan Evans questioned the book's 2002 English translation, which changed the book's setting from France to England as well as changing francs to pounds. Guardian reviewer Nicholas Lezard also commented on the changes to the book, stating that the "geographical and cultural translations are by no means consistent or necessarily successful".

== Adaptations ==
=== Theater ===
A stage production of 99 Francs was performed in the Treviso Theater that was directed by Stéphane Aucante.

=== Film ===
In 2004 it was announced that a film adaptation of 99 Francs was in development. The film was released on September 26, 2007, and was praised by AgoraVox as being "uncompromising".
