= The Blue Hour (2014 film) =

- Theatrical release poster
- Directed by: Evelyne Pegot
- Written by: Evelyne Pegot
- Produced by: Evelyne Pegot; Frank Pérez-Garland; Gustavo Sánchez
- Starring: Giovanni Ciccia; Jackelyn Vásquez; Rossana Fernández-Maldonado
- Cinematography: Roberto Maceda Kohatsu
- Edited by: Carlos Alberto Alvarez
- Music by: Antonio Gervasoni
- Production companies: Panda Films; La Soga Producciones
- Release date: 23 August 2014 (Montréal World Film Festival)
- Running time: 87 minutes
- Country: Peru
- Language: Spanish

The Blue Hour (Spanish: La hora azul), also known as Before Dawn, is a 2014 Peruvian drama film written, directed and co-produced by Evelyne Pegot in her directorial debut. It is based on the 2005 novel of the same name by Alonso Cueto. Starring Giovanni Ciccia, Jackelyn Vásquez and Rossana Fernández-Maldonado.

== Synopsis ==
It tells the story of a successful lawyer who, after discovering disquieting and disturbing facts from the past of his father's life, a prominent army commander during the country's internal armed conflict, begins to investigate for the truth of what happened.

== Cast ==
The actors participating in this film are:

- Giovanni Ciccia as Adrian Ormache
- Jackelyn Vásquez as Miriam
- Rossana Fernández-Maldonado as Claudia
- Lucho Cáceres
- Reynaldo Arenas
- Haydeé Cáceres

== Production ==
=== Script ===
In 2007, he tried to contact Alonso Cueto, author of the novel, but to no avail. 2 years ago he spoke with Alonso Cueto to finally adapt his novel to the cinema.

=== Financing ===
In 2012, the film won the 2012 Feature Film Contest – MinCul Peru where it received S/.550,000 to start filming. In 2016, he won the First Feature Film Distribution Project Contest where he received S/.420,000 for commercial distribution.

=== Filming ===
Principal photography lasted four weeks, from May to June 2013 in Lima and Ayacucho.

== Release ==
It initially premiered at the end of August 2014 at the Montreal International Film Festival. On April 21, 2015, it premiered at the Chicago Latino Film Festival. It was commercially released on October 13, 2016, in Peruvian theaters.

== Awards ==
Year	Award	Category	Recipient	Result	Ref.
2014	Montreal International Film Festival	Golden Zenith	Evelyne Pegot	Nominated	
2014	Huelva Ibero-American Film Festival	The Key of Freedom	The Blue Hour	Won	
2017	Luces Awards	Best Film	The Blue Hour	Nominated	
2017	Luces Awards	Best Actor	Giovanni Ciccia	Nominated	
