= Requiem for a Lost Empire =

2000 novel by Andreï Makine

- Author: Andreï Makine
- Original title: Requiem pour l'Est
- Language: French
- Publisher: Éditions Gallimard
- Publication date: 22 February 2000
- Publication place: Franc
- English publication date: 1 August 2001
- Pages: 228
- ISBN: 2715221940

Requiem for a Lost Empire (French: Requiem pour l'Est) is a 2000 novel by the French-Russian writer Andreï Makine.

== Plot ==
The novel follows a Russian family over three generations. It begins during the Stalin era and centres on the farmer Pavel who is in conflict with the regime during the collectivisation. Later in the 20th century, Pavel's son is involved in KGB espionage and goes to the United States to seek out the murderers of his lover. Pavel's father is introduced and was a deserter from the Red Army.

== Reception ==
Publishers Weekly wrote that the book is beautifully and lyrically written, praising Makine's treatment of memories and repetitions over the generations. Kirkus Reviews called the book moving and resonant, but wrote that "geopolitical conflict is analyzed with a tad too much discursive insistence", comparing it to The English Patient and calling it "a lesser work".
