= The Art of Losing (novel) =

2017 novel by Alice Zeniter

The Art of Losing (original French title: L'Art de perdre) is a 2017 novel by Alice Zeniter, translated from French to English by Frank Wynne. L'art de perdre is Zeniter's fifth book and the second translated into English.

== Plot ==
The novel follows a family through three generations starting with a Kabyle grandfather, who helps neither the FLN nor the French colonists during the Algerian War. Fearing that his family would be treated as Harki traitors after independence regardless, due to his known aversion to the "fellagha", he manages to secure passage to the Rivesaltes camp and later to an HLM in Normandy where his granddaughter Naïma's father grows up. Little of this history is shared with Naïma (the main character), and this shapes her identity as much as the places and events she turns up in her research prior to a trip to Algeria undertaken to secure a dying artist's sketches for an exhibition in Paris. As she returns to Algiers to fly back to France, it is the last in a series of Algerian drivers who recites Elizabeth Bishop's poem "The Art of Losing" to her.

== Awards ==
It won many awards, including the 2017 Prix Goncourt des Lycéens and Le Monde’s Literary Prize. The English translation won the Dublin Literary Award in 2022.

== Reception ==
Grace Byron in The Observer called it "...a book that requires rapt attention. It is a novel that scales the walls of history and excavates lessons with curiosity and anger... The Art of Losing is a visceral book. It does not shy away from writing history in shades of gray, nor does it glamorize those who fought for Algerian independence. "

Angelique Chrisafis in The Guardian wrote "The book reflects the current thirst in French storytelling for writers of mixed heritage to address parts of history and society that have been left untold."

Liesl Schillinger wrote in The Washington Street Journal that "Zeniter’s extraordinary achievement is to transform a complicated conflict into a compelling family chronicle, rich in visual detail and lustrous in language. Her storytelling, splendidly translated by Frank Wynne, carries the reader through different generations, cities, cultures, and mindsets without breaking its spell…"

Boyd Tonkin in The Spectator said the novel "show[s] how tough a task awaits any reconciler of the past’s mangled accounts. Not only, as Alice Zeniter’s heroine Naïma reflects in The Art of Losing, has each community ‘reached an agreement on the version of history that suited them', but internal rifts fragment them."
