= Laurent Quintreau =

French writer

Laurent Quintreau is a French writer. He was one of the founders of the now-defunct magazine Revue Perpendiculaire, along with Nicolas Bourriaud, Christophe Duchatelet, Jean-Yves Jouannais, Jacques-François Marchandise, Christophe Kihm and Michel Houellebecq.

His 2008 novel Marge Brute was translated into English as Gross Margin by Polly McLean. He has also written another novel called Mandalas.
