= Emiliano Monge =

Mexican writer

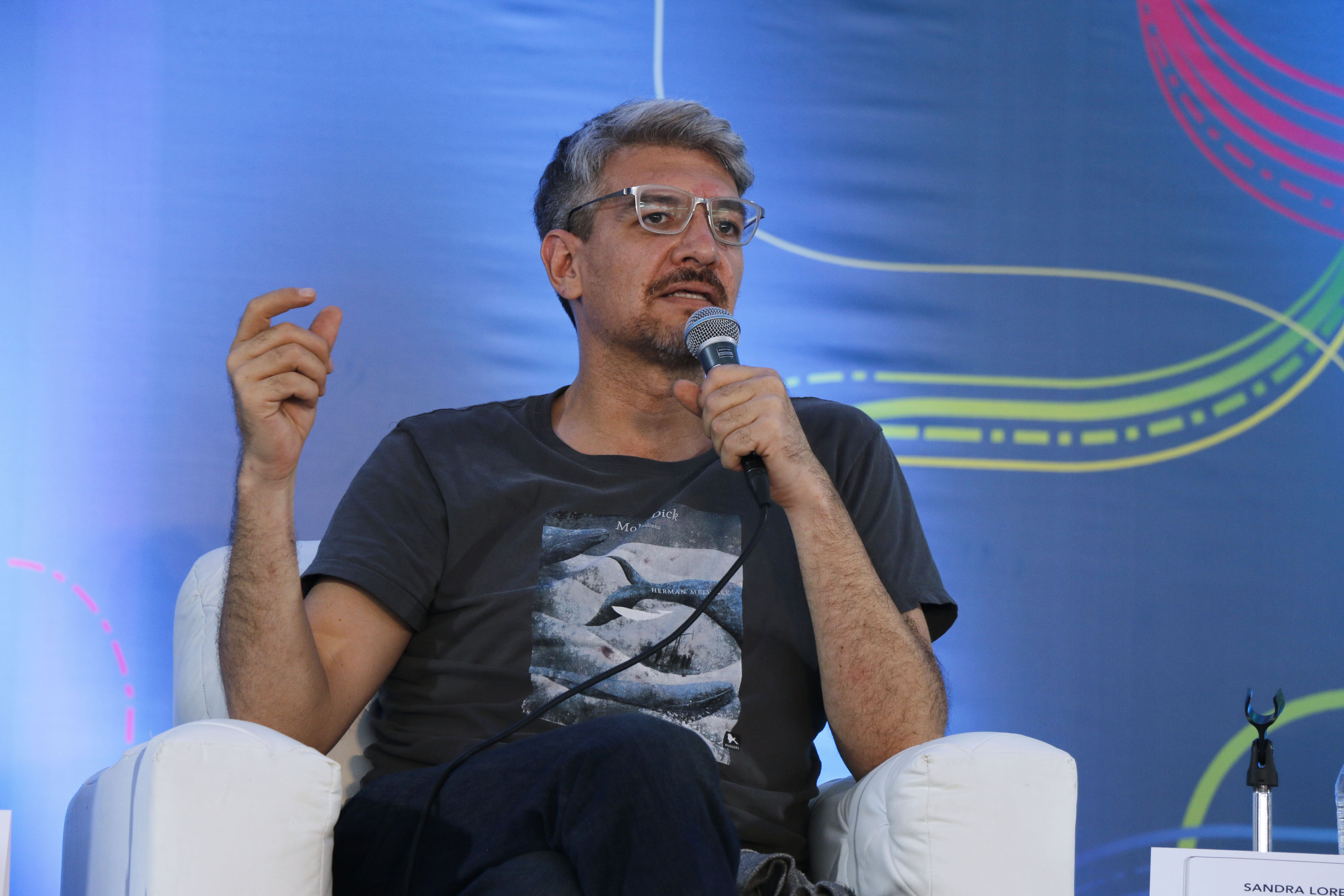
Emiliano Monge at a talk in 2016

Emiliano Monge (born 6 January 1978) is a Mexican short story writer and novelist. Three of his novels, The Arid Sky, Among the Lost and What goes unsaid have been translated into English.

== Biography and books ==
Born in Mexico City on 6 January 1978, Emiliano Monge studied political science at the National Autonomous University of Mexico, and taught there as a professor. He moved to Barcelona and embarked on a career as a writer. His short story collection Arrastrar esa sombra was a finalist for the 2008 Prix Antonin-Artaud, and his novel Morirse de memoria was a finalist for the same award in 2010, winning Monge the Jaén Prize for novels. His works have also been published in La Jornada, Letras Libres and the Hoja por Hoja book review of Reforma.

=== El cielo árido ===
Mexican novelist Álvaro Enrigue commented on Monge's El cielo árido (2012), and placed him in the group of "Mexico's new writers" (Enrigue sees a watershed in Felipe Calderón start in 2006 of the Mexican drug war) who are less inclined to employ allegory, and who

are much more open in the way they represent the world they inherited... Monge published an extraordinary novel last year, El cielo árido (The barren sky), in which the chaos that violence brings to people's lives is rendered by a desperate narrative device: as the plot moves forward, the narrator changes the names of the characters because nothing is what it seems.

El cielo árido was translated into English by Thomas Bunstead and published by Restless Books; the main character is "a ruthless outlaw turned even more ruthless head of a small state ministry". It received positive reviews in the English press, with one critic praising his prose as "crisp" and commenting on "his nonlinear narration [which] creates a heightened sense of unpredictability". Mark Athitakis, writing for the Los Angeles Times, called it a "stellar English-language debut".

The book was translated in other languages, including Dutch. Geurt Frantzen, for Literair Nederland, commented on the "exuberance" that he says characterizes much Latin-American writing, but noted that Monge's style is quite distinct and has a 19th-century flavor to it. The narrator/author is very much present and, according to Frantzen, seems anxious to actually break into the story, announcing upcoming events; Frantzen also comments on the main character's development, from a ruthless killer to someone who almost chooses a less violent family life. Maarten Steenmeijer, in de Volkskrant, writes that Monge seems to proudly lean on the Latin-American tradition (in "themes, settings, and style") that Roberto Bolaño and others rejected, but without falling back into magical realism. Steenmeijer sees comparisons with two Mexican classics, Juan Rulfo's Pedro Páramo and Carlos Fuentes's The Death of Artemio Cruz, but that Monge's debut is "magisterial": "Praise to the author, praise to the translators. The Arid Sky is a great Latin-American novel, even in Dutch".

=== Among the Lost ===
Monge's 2018 novel Among the Lost is a love story between two human traffickers set in the jungles and wastelands of the Mexican–US border area. The Guardian said "Monge balances the dour, apocalyptic brutality of Cormac McCarthy with lively, grim humour – evident in the exasperated exchanges – all of which makes the stark truths driving this flamboyant narrative a little easier to swallow". When asked in an interview with TLS about writing as a political act, he answered, "They are inseparable. It has nothing to do with the themes or the characters, but the language. It is inalienable. When sitting before the blank page, the only certainty that must be had is to write in a language different from the language of power. This for me is also fundamental". The novel was awarded the Elena Poniatowska Iberoamerican Novel Prize in 2016 by the Mexico City government.

=== No contar todo ===
In 2018, Monge released No contar todo (Not Telling Everything), his first nonfiction title. The book tells three autobiographical tales, interwoven to explore the generational acculturation towards "male violence". One focuses on his grandfather, Carlos Monge Mckey, who faked his own death after blowing up a quarry owned by his brother-in-law. Another relates his family's rules for protection when home alone, as a response to the violent era of Monge's childhood. The final story is about his father, Carlos Monge Sánchez, who fought as a guerrilla soldier alongside Genaro Vázquez Rojas. El País described the book as "a journey through the torments of a country—already overdiagnosed in multiple essays—but that cries out for the humanization of its daily realities". El Cultural hailed Monge's "realistic creation of three distinct voices, an achievement that is ever more rare in contemporary narrative".

== Publications ==
=== Short story collections ===
- Arrastrar esa sombra (Sexto Piso, 2008, ISBN 978-8496867222)
- La superficie más honda (Random House, 2017, ISBN 978-6073149815)

=== Novels ===
- Morirse de memoria (Sexto Piso, 2011, ISBN 978-8496867581)
- El cielo árido (Primera, 2012, ISBN 9788439727088), translated into English as The Arid Sky (Restless, 2018, ISBN 9781632061348)
- Las tierras arrasadas, translated into English as Among the Lost (2018, Scribe, ISBN 9781947534797)
- No contar todo (Random House, 2018, ISBN 9786073170000)
