= Nathacha Appanah =

Mauritian-French author (born 1973)

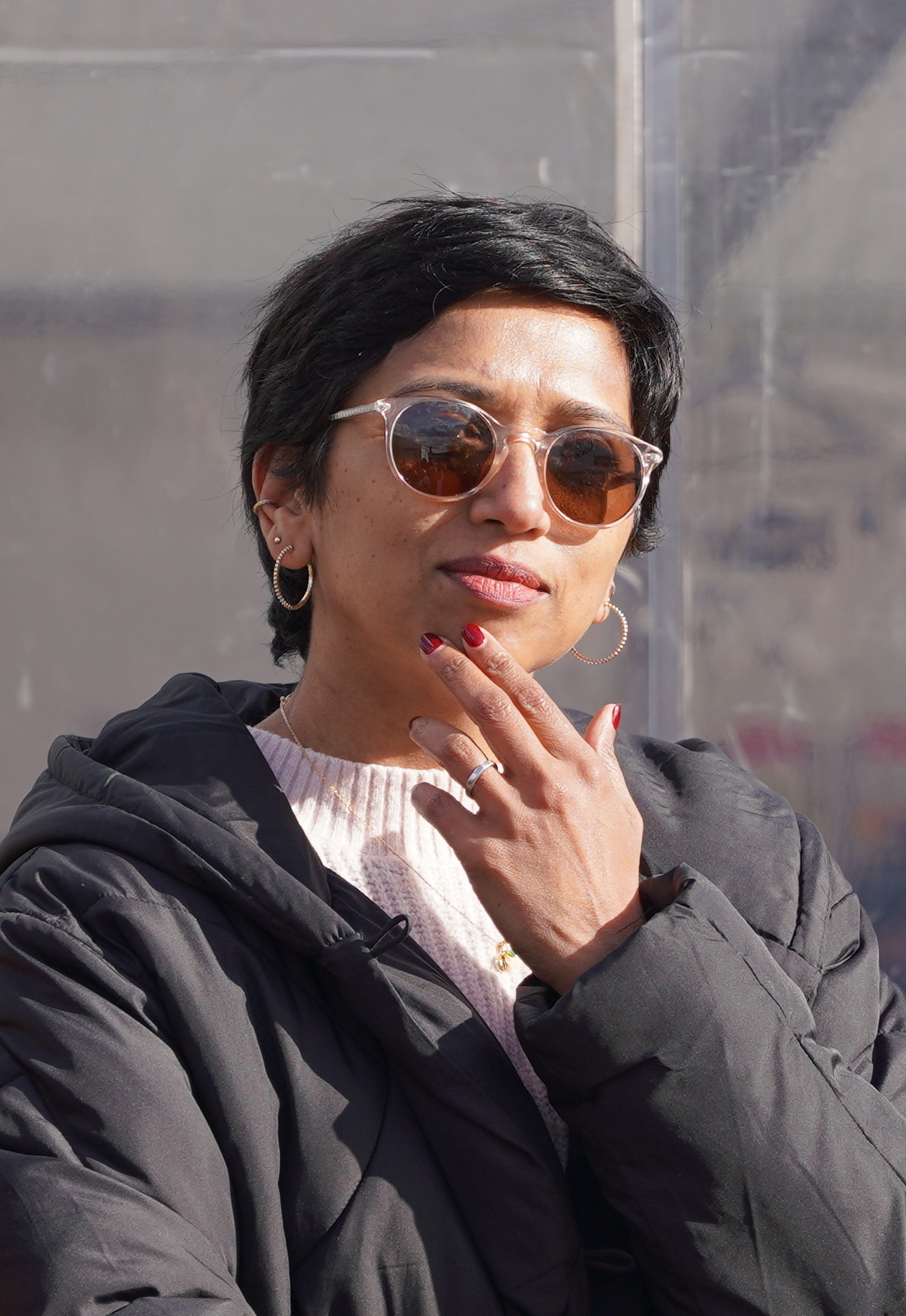
- Nathacha Appanah in 2023
- Born: Nathacha Devi Pathareddy Appanah; 24 May 1973 (age 53); Mauritius
- Occupation: Novelist
- Writing career
- Language: French
- Genre: Labor migration
- Notable awards: Prix RFO du livre

Nathacha Devi Pathareddy Appanah (born 24 May 1973 in Mahébourg, Mauritius) is a Mauritian-French author. She spent most of her teenage years in Mauritius and also worked as a journalist/columnist at Le Mauricien and Week-End Scope before emigrating to France. She was a contributor to the poetry and news section during her tenure in the magazines.

Since 1998, Nathacha Appanah has been well-known as an active writer. Her first book Les Rochers de Poudre d'Or (published by Éditions Gallimard) received the "Prix RFO du livre". The book was based on the arrival of Indian indentured workers in Mauritius. Her other works like The Last Brother, detailing struggles during the Nazi attack and migration to Czechoslovakia, and Tropic of Violence, based on children on the streets of Mayotte, are critically acclaimed. In 2025 her novel La Nuit au Coeur won the Prix Femina, the Prix Goncourt des Lycéens and the Prix Renaudot des Lycéens.

== Early life ==
Appanah was born in Mauritius on 24 May 1973. She descends from Hindu Telugu-speaking indian indentured labourers. Her first language is Mauritian creole (Morisyen) like most people from Mauritius. She had her early education in Mauritius. She worked as a journalist in Le Mauricien and Weekend Scope, popular magazines in Mauritius. She migrated to France in 1998, after which she started her writing career. During her tenure in the magazines, she published poetry and news about Mauritius.

== Works ==
Her first novel was The Rocks of Gold Dust, published in the collection Dark Continents by famous French publisher Gallimard. Her second novel, Blue Bay Palace, details the passion of a young Indian for a person from another caste. She also wrote La Noce d'Anna (2005, Éditions Gallimard), which received prizes at some regional festivals in France. The book is set entirely in France. In 2007, she released her fourth book Le Dernier Frère Ed de L'Olivier, which went on to win the Prix FNAC.

Her work Tropic of Violence is based on children on the streets of Mayotte. The struggle of the Department of Migratory Authorities and the delinquency of youth has been pictured in the novel. In her own words, Appanah narrates that "I lived in Mayotte from 2008 to 2010 and had been struck by the number of children in the streets. They were not abandoned, they were not the round they were playing happily on every street corner, some were even occasionally at school and in the evening, they found a roof."

Her novel The Last Brother is based on an orphaned Jew who escaped the Nazi invasion of Czechoslovakia and was denied entry into British-run Palestine. In a review published in The Guardian about the novel, it has been quoted as "a brilliant and believable account, a compelling picture of a child's loneliness and of the brief, feverish excitement when it ends". The New York Times rated her fourth novel, The Last Brother next only to 2008 Nobel Prize winner J. M. G. Le Clézio among all Mauritian writers. The book was translated into English by Geoffrey Strachan and was her second work to be translated.

In 2018 Graywolf Press published Waiting for Tomorrow, also translated into English by Geoffrey Strachan. It was shortlisted for the 2019 Albertine Prize.

== Bibliography ==
- 2003: Les Rochers de Poudre d'or – Prix RFO, prix Rosine-Perrier
- 2004: Blue Bay Palace (Blue Bay Palace), translated by Alexandra Stanton (Aflame Books, 2009)
- 2005: La Noce d'Anna – Prix grand public du Salon du livre de Paris, prix Passion, prix Critiques libres 2008
- 2007: The Last Brother (Le Dernier Frère), translated by Geoffrey Strachan (MacLehose, 2010; Graywolf, 2011) – prix du roman Fnac, prix des lecteurs de L'Express, prix Culture et Bibliothèques pour tous, prix Obiou, prix de la Fondation France-Israël
- 2015: Waiting for Tomorrow (En attendant demain), translated by Geoffrey Strachan (Graywolf, 2018)
- 2016: Tropic of Violence (Tropique de la violence), translated by Geoffrey Strachan (MacLehose, 2018; Graywolf, 2020) – prix Femina des lycéens, Prix du roman métis des lycéens 2017, Prix des lycéens Folio 2019
- 2016: Petit Éloge des fantômes
- 2018: Une année lumière (essays)
- 2019: The Sky Above the Roof (Le Ciel par-dessus le toit), translated by Geoffrey Strachan (MacLehose, 2021; Graywolf, 2022)
- 2021: Rien ne t'appartient
- 2022: La Mémoire délavée
- 2023: La Traversée des sentiments, short story, published in the collective authorship volume Brèves Rencontres by Gallimard
- 2025: La Nuit au coeur, novel - won the Prix Femina, the Prix Goncourt des Lycéens and the Prix Renaudot des Lycéens.
