= The Blue Hour (novel) =

2005 novel by Alonso Cueto

- First edition
- Author: Alonso Cueto
- Original title: La Hora Azul
- Translator: Frank Wynne
- Language: Spanish
- Genre: Political thriller
- Publisher: Random House UK
- Publication date: 2005
- Publication place: Spain
- English publication date: 2014
- ISBN: 978-0099533092 (English H/B)
- Followed by: Grandes Miradas (2006)

The Blue Hour (La Hora Azul) is a 2005 novel by Peruvian novelist Alonso Cueto. It won the Premio Herralde de Novela for Spanish-language novels in 2006. The English translation, by Frank Wynne, was published in 2012, and won the 2013 Premio Valle-Inclán; it was shortlisted for the Oxford-Weidenfeld Translation Prize in the same year.

Mario Vargas Llosa described this book as "a magnificent novel that describes ten years of civil war and terrorism with lucidity and resonant fantasy".

Another Nobel Prize winner, J.M. Coetzee described it as "s dark and disturbing novel".

The story concerns a successful lawyer from Lima and his search for a woman whom he discovers had been kidnapped and held as a virtual sex slave by his now deceased father, a former military officer, during the war against the Shining Path guerrilla organization in the hinterland of Peru. Although ostensibly a political thriller, it is also a story of redemption and an attempt by the protagonist to disperse some of the ghosts haunting his country after years of internal strife.

== Film adaptation ==
A film adaptation of the book was made, initially premiering in late August 2014 at the Montreal International Film Festival. It was commercially released on October 13, 2016 in Peruvian theaters.
