= Holiday in a Coma =

1994 novel by Frédéric Beigbeder

- Author: Frédéric Beigbeder
- Original title: Vacances dans le coma
- Translator: Frank Wynne
- Language: French
- Publisher: Éditions Grasset
- Publication date: 2 February 1994
- Publication place: France
- English publication date: 2007
- Pages: 238
- ISBN: 978-2-246-48291-8

Holiday in a Coma (French: Vacances dans le coma) is a 1994 novel by the French writer Frédéric Beigbeder.

== Plot ==
The entire novel is set during the opening night of a new nightclub in Paris called Shit. The club's concept is that the dance floor is designed like an enormous toilet bowl that can be flushed with foam by the DJ. The main character Marc Marronnier has been invited to the event by his friend Joss Dumoulin, an internationally famous DJ. As the night proceeds, the guests compete in decadence and the ability to shock each other.

== Reception ==
Sarah McIntyre wrote for RTÉ: "With hideous portrayal of vapid fashionistas, aristocrats and try hard hipsters, no one is safe from [Beigbeder's] scathing remarks. This satirical look at high Parisian society is propelled by fury, but softened by his sharp wit." Alastair Sooke of The Daily Telegraph described the novel as "Hieronymus Bosch-like" in its portrayal of "depravity and orgiastic violence", and wrote that Beigbeder's satire is not gratuitous.
