= Alice Zeniter =

French writer

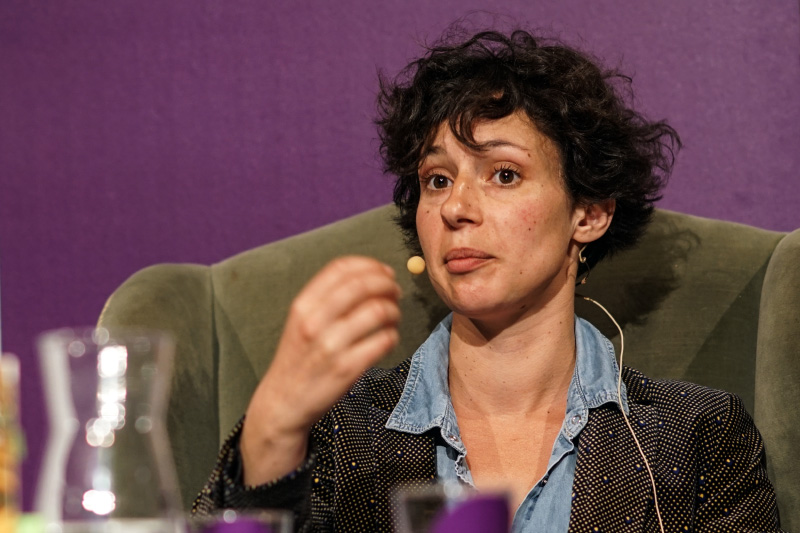
- Zeniter in 2019
- Born: 1986 (age 39–40); Clamart, France
- Education: École Normale Supérieure
- Writing career
- Years active: 2003–present
- Notable works: Juste avant l'Oubli; L'Art de Perdre

Alice Zeniter (born 1986) is a French novelist, translator, scriptwriter, dramatist and director.

She has won a Prix Renaudot young adult award for her third novel, Juste avant l'Oubli, and a Prix Goncourt young adult for her fourth novel, L'Art de Perdre.

Zeniter published her first novel, Deux moins un égal zéro, at the age of 16. Her second novel, Jusque dans nos bras, was published in 2010 and translated into English as Take This Man.

Her novel, L'Art de Perdre, won multiple prizes and awards. It was published in English in 2021 as The Art of Losing, for which she won the Dublin Literary Award along with its translator Frank Wynne.

== Early life ==
Zeniter was born in Clamart, to an Algerian father and a French mother. She was raised in Champfleur and lived there until she was 17. She continued her studies in Alençon. From 2006 until 2011 she was a student at École Normale Supérieure in Paris.

== Works ==
=== Works in English ===
- Take this man, New York: Europa, 2012. ISBN 9781609450533, OCLC 760291543
- The Art of Losing, (translated by Frank Wynne) London: Picador (imprint) ISBN 9781509884117, 2021; New York: Farrar, Straus and Giroux, 2021 ISBN 0374182302, 978-0374182304.

=== Novels ===
- Deux moins un égal zéro, Nantes, France, Éditions du Petit Véhicule, coll. « Plaine Page », 2003, 112 p. (ISBN 2-84273-361-4)
- Jusque dans nos bras, Paris, Albin Michel, 2010, 236 p. (ISBN 978-2-226-19593-7)
  - Prix littéraire de la Porte Dorée 2010
  - Prix littéraire Laurence Trân 2011
- Sombre Dimanche, Paris, Albin Michel, 2013, 236 p. (ISBN 978-2-226-24517-5)
  - Prix de la Closerie des Lilas 2013
  - Prix du Livre Inter 2013
  - Prix des lecteurs de l'Express 2013
- Juste avant l'Oubli, Flammarion, 2015,
  - Prix Renaudot des lycéens 2015
- L'Art de Perdre, Flammarion, 2017. ISBN 9782363604491, OCLC 1041421172
  - Prix Goncourt des lycéens 2017
  - Prix littéraire du Monde 2017
  - Prix Landerneau des lecteurs 2017
  - Prix des libraires de Nancy
  - Prix Liste Goncourt : le choix polonais, Cracovie, 2017
  - Prix Liste Goncourt : le choix de la Suisse 2017
  - Finaliste Prix Goncourt 2017
  - Dublin Literary Award
- Comme un empire dans un empire, Flammarion, 2020. ISBN 9782081515437, OCLC 1197718937
- Frapper l’épopée, Flammarion, 2024, 317p. ISBN 978-2-08-044059-4

=== Theatre ===
- Spécimens humains avec monstres, 2011
- Hansel et Gretel, Editions Acte Sud, 2018

== Translation ==
- I love Dick, Chris Kraus, Editions Flammarion, 2016

== Filmography ==
- Fever, 2014
