= Frédéric Beigbeder =

French writer (born 1965)

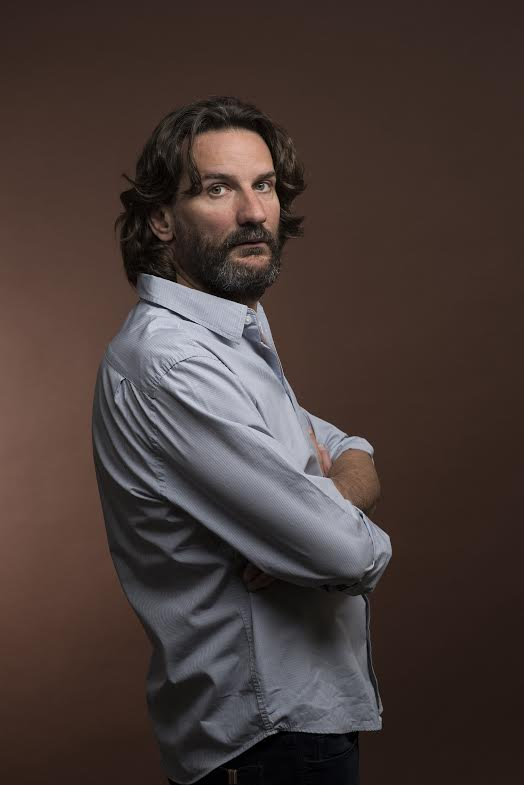
- Beigbeder in 2014
- Born: 21 September 1965 (age 60); Neuilly-sur-Seine, France
- Writing career
- Notable awards: Prix Interallié in 2003 for his novel Windows on the World, Prix Renaudot in 2009 for his book A French Novel

Frédéric Beigbeder (French: [fʁedeʁik bɛɡbede]; born 21 September 1965) is a French writer, literary critic and television presenter. He won the Prix Interallié in 2003 for his novel Windows on the World and the Prix Renaudot in 2009 for his book A French Novel. He is also the creator of the Flore and Sade Awards. In addition, he is the executive director of Lui, a French adult entertainment magazine.

== Life and career ==
Beigbeder was born into a privileged family in Neuilly-sur-Seine, Hauts-de-Seine. His mother, Christine de Chasteigner, is a translator of novels (Barbara Cartland et al.); his brother is Charles Beigbeder, a businessman. His parents divorced when he was between 5 and 7 years old. He studied at the Lycée Montaigne and Louis-le-Grand, and later at the Institut d'Etudes Politiques de Paris and the CELSA Paris-Sorbonne. Upon graduation at the age of 24, he began work as a copywriter in Young & Rubicam, then as an author, broadcaster, publisher, and dilettante.

In 1994, Beigbeder founded the "Prix de Flore", which takes its name from the Café de Flore in Saint-Germain-des-Prés. The prize is awarded annually to a promising young French author. Vincent Ravalec, Jacques A. Bertrand, Michel Houellebecq are among those who have won the prize. In 2004, the tenth anniversary of the prize, it was awarded to the only American to ever receive it, Bruce Benderson.

Beigbeder is on the jury of the Prix Fitzgerald, a literary prize in the French Riviera where Francis Scott Fitzgerald wrote Tender is the Night.

Three of Beigbeder's novels, 99 Francs, Love Lasts Three Years and Windows on the World, have been or will be adapted for the cinema. The film of Windows on the World will be directed by the French/English director Max Pugh.

In 2002, he presented the TV talk show ypershow on the French channel Canal +, co-presented with Jonathan Lambert, Sabine Crossen and Henda. That year he also advised French Communist Party candidate Robert Hue in the presidential election.

In 2005, he was, with other authors such as Alain Decaux, Richard Millet and Jean-Pierre Thiollet, one of the Beirut Book Fair's guests in the Beirut International Exhibition & Leisure Center.

He worked for a few years as an editor for Flammarion. He left Flammarion in 2006.

His novel A French Novel was awarded the Prix Renaudot in November 2009. He has written columns in Le Figaro Magazine since 2010.

Beigbeder's writing style includes both humour and self-mockery. His books are full of high-low cultural references.

In addition, he hosts Le Cercle, a TV programme of literary and film reviews broadcast on Canal+ Cinéma.

On 12 December 2023, he was detained by French police over allegations of rape of a young woman. Beigbeder denies the allegations.

== Chronology of works ==
He published his first novel Mémoires d'un jeune homme dérangé which was published by La Table Ronde in 1990 when he was 25.

He published his second novel, Holiday in a Coma, in 1994, followed by Love Lasts Three Years, the last book of the trilogy of Marc Marronier, one of his main characters. Then, he wrote a collection of short stories entitled Nouvelles sous Ecstasy published by Gallimard.

In 2000, Frédéric Beigbeder was dismissed from the advertising agency Young & Rubicam after publishing his satirical novel 99 F (original title of the paperback edition: each edition in French and other languages was named after its actual retail price, for instance in the United States it was named $9.99, in Germany it became Neununddreißigneunzig and even its French title was changed after the Franc was replaced as the official currency by the Euro in 2001, as well as for the pocket edition) in which he criticized the advertising world, and which simultaneously turned him into a prominent author (that book generated significant press coverage, very good sales in the original French edition, and was later translated in English and several other languages).

He won the Prix Interallié in 2003 for his Windows on the World which takes place at the World Trade Center on September 11th, 2001. The English translation, by Frank Wynne, was awarded the Independent Foreign Fiction Prize in 2005.

In 2005, he published L'Égoïste romantique (The Romantic Egoist). In 2007, he published Au secours pardon, the sequel of 99F.

In 2008, he was arrested for snorting cocaine off the hood of a car in Paris in the 8th arrondissement. He was also in possession of 2.6 grams of cocaine. The arrest inspired his book A French Novel.

== Selected publications ==
- Mémoires d'un jeune homme dérangé (1990)
- Holiday in a Coma (1994)
- Love Lasts Three Years (1997)
- Nouvelles sous ecstasy (1999)
- 99 Francs (2000)
- Dernier inventaire avant liquidation (2001)
- Windows on the World (2003)
- L'Égoïste romantique (2005)
- Au secours pardon (2007)
- A French Novel (2009)
- Premier bilan après l'apocalypse (2011)
- Manhattan's Babe (2014)
- A Life Without End (2018)
- L'Homme qui pleure de rire (2020)
- Un barrage contre l'Atlantique (2022)
- Confessions d'un hétérosexuel légèrement dépassé (2023)
- Dictionnaire amoureux des écrivains français d'aujourd'hui (2023)
- Un homme seul (2025)
