= Alonso Cueto =

Peruvian author, university professor and newspaper columnist

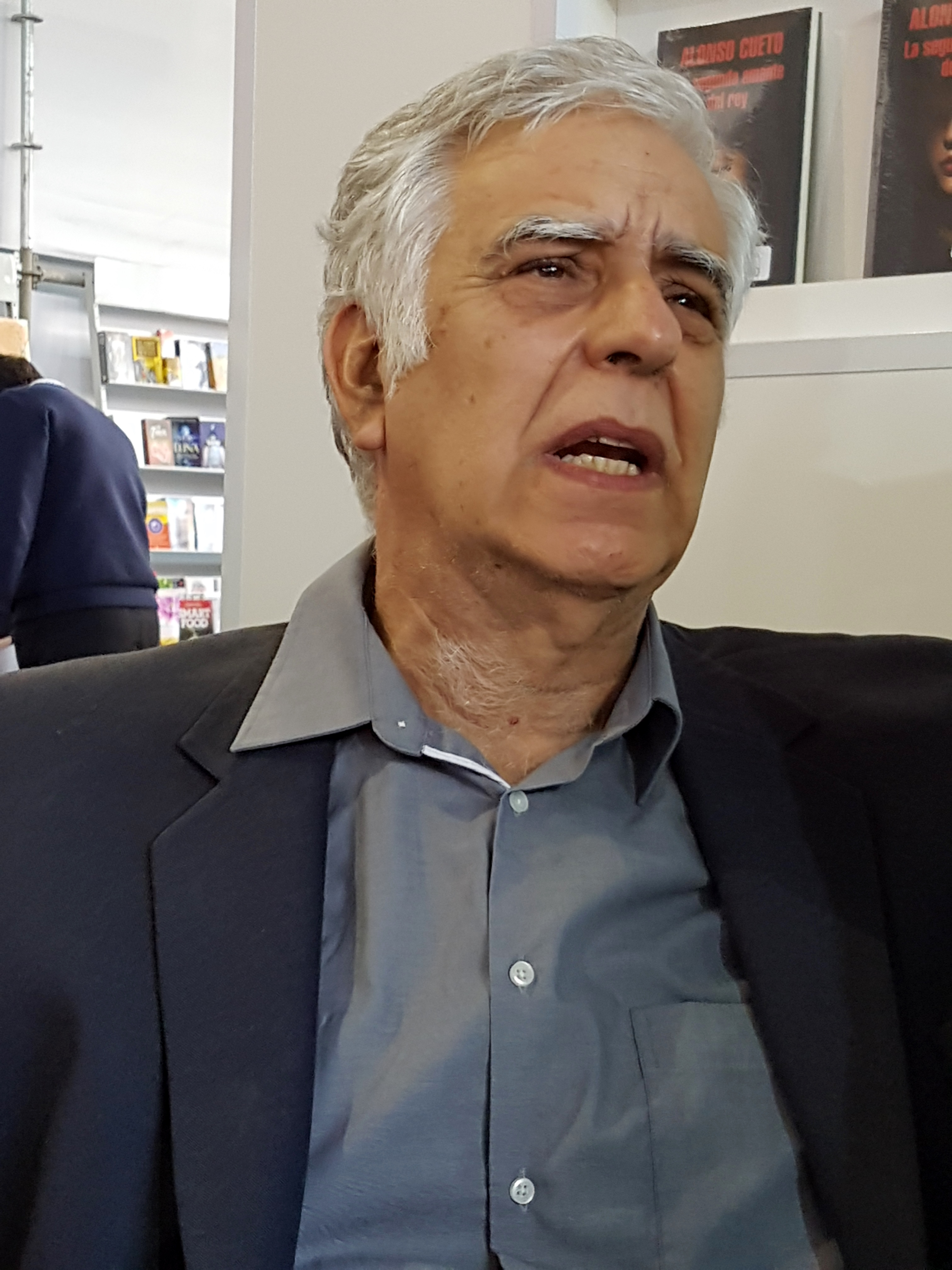
- Cueto in FILSA 2017
- Born: 30 April 1954 (age 72); Lima, Peru
- Education: Pontifical Catholic University of Peru; University of Texas at Austin
- Occupations: Writer, journalist, professor
- Writing career
- Notable works: La hora azul El susurro de la mujer ballena La viajera del viento, Grandes miradas

Alonso Cueto Caballero (born 1954 in Lima, Peru) is a Peruvian author, university professor and newspaper columnist.

His writing career has spanned nearly four decades, during which he has produced dozens of works of fiction, articles and essays. He has won numerous accolades for his work, and several of his novels have been adapted for film.

== Biography ==
The son of Peruvian philosopher and educator Carlos Cueto Fernandini and children's literature promoter Lilly Caballero de Cueto, Alonso Cueto spent his early childhood in France and the United States before returning to Peru at the age of seven.

Cueto earned a bachelor's degree in literature from the Catholic University of Peru and a Ph.D. in literature from the University of Texas at Austin, where he completed his first collection of short stories, La batalla del pasado.

He returned to Peru in 1984 and published several books over the succeeding decades, including the award-winning Tigre Blanco. At the same time, he worked as a columnist for several publications and served as director of El Comercio’s El Dominical Sunday supplement.

In 2003, he left El Comercio to pursue writing and teaching full-time. He is married to Kristeen Keenan Atwook and has two sons.

== Writing career ==
In 2005, he published his best-known novel, La hora azul, in which a wealthy lawyer searches for the woman his military father had taken prisoner during the armed struggle between the Peruvian government and Shining Path rebels. Mario Vargas Llosa called the book, which won the prestigious Herralde Prize in 2005, "a magnificent novel that lucidly and imaginatively describes the aftermath of 10 years of civil war and terrorism", and J.M. Coetzee describes it as "a dark and disturbing novel". La hora azul was followed by two spiritual successors, La pasajera and La viajera del viento, to form Redención, the acclaimed trilogy on the years of terrorism and political strife in Peru.

His novels have been translated into sixteen languages, with Frank Wynne's English-language translation of La hora azul, The Blue Hour, winning the Valle Inclán prize for translation.

Besides novels, Cueto has written several short story collections and essays as well as a children's book and a play. He also teaches in the Department of Literature at the Catholic University of Peru and writes a weekly column for El Comercio newspaper.

Several of Cueto's works have been adapted for film, including La pasajera, which was the inspiration for Magallanes by director Salvador del Solar. Grandes miradas was adapted into Mariposa negra, a 2006 film by the awarded director Francisco Lombardi, and La hora azul served as the basis for the 2014 movie of the same name by Evelyne Pegot-Ogier.

In October, 2020 the University of Texas Press published the English version of The Wind Traveller translated by Frank Wynne and Jessie Mendez Sayer.

== Awards and honors ==
- Wiracocha Prize, 1985, for the novel El tigre blanco
- Anna Seghers Prize (Germany), 2000, for his body of work
- Guggenheim Fellowship, 2002-2003
- Herralde Prize, 2005, for The Blue Hour (La hora azul)
- Best Spanish-language novel, Editorial House of the Republic of China for the best novel written in 2004-2005, for The Blue Hour (La hora azul)
- Second place in the Planeta-Casa de América Prize, 2007, for the novel El susurro de la mujer ballena
- Elected as a member of the Peruvian Academy of Language, 2009
- Tribute at the International Book Fair of Lima, 2010
- Recognition for his contribution to culture from the Ministry of Culture of Peru, 2017
- Premio de Narrativa Alcobendas Juan Goytisolo 2019 for Palabras de otro lado, 2019.
- Premio ProArt 2024 for the novel 'Francisca. Princesa del Perú'

== Works ==
- La batalla del pasado, short-story collection, Alfaguara, Madrid, 1983, Editorial Apoyo, 1996, Alfagura Juvenil Perú, 1998
- El tigre blanco, novel, Editorial Planeta Peru, 1985; 2007
- Los vestidos de una dama, short-story collection, Editorial Peisa, Lima, 1987; 1998
- Deseo de noche, novel, Editorial Apoyo, 1993, Editorial Pre-Textos, 2003
- Amores de invierno, Apoyo, 1994, Planeta, 2006
- El vuelo de la ceniza, novel, Apoyo, 1995, Seix Barral, 2007
- Cinco para las nueve y otros cuentos, short story collection for young people, Alfaguara, Lima, 1996; Barcelona Digital Editions, 2014
- Pálido cielo, short-story collection, Peisa, 1998, Norma, 2010
- Demonio del mediodía, novel, Peisa, 1999
- El otro amor de Diana Abril, three novellas: El otro amor de Diana Abril; Dalia y los perros; and Lágrimas artificiales, Peisa, 2002
- Encuentro casual, play, Peisa, 2002
- Grandes miradas, Peisa, 2003 (Editorial Anagrama, 2005; Penguin Random House, 2017)
- Mario Vargas Llosa. La vida en movimiento, interview and essay, Fondo Editorial de la UPC, 2003
- Valses, rajes y cortejos, collection of newspaper columns, Peisa, 2005
- La hora azul, Peisa / Anagrama, 2005, Planeta, 2013, Penguin Random House, 2018
- El susurro de la mujer ballena, novel, Planeta, 2007, Penguin Random House, 2018
- Sueños reales, essays, Seix Barral, 2008
- Rosa Mercedes Ayarza, biography, Edelnor, Lima, 2009
- Juan Carlos Onetti. El soñador en la penumbra, essay, Fondo de Cultura Económica, 2009
- La venganza del silencio, novel, Planeta, 2010
- El árbol del tesoro, children's book, illustrations by Isabelle Decenciere, Planeta, 2011
- Cuerpos secretos, novel, Planeta, 2012
- La piel de un escritor. Contar, escribir y leer historias, essays, Fondo Cultura Económica, 2014
- Lágrimas artificiales / Dalia y los perros, two novellas, Peisa, 2014
- La pasajera, novela breve, Seix Barral, 2015
- Duelo en la Ciudad de Plata, historical novel, Seix Barral, 2015
- La viajera del viento, novela, Planeta, 2016
- La segunda amante del rey, novel, Penguin Random House, 2017
- La passagère du vent, novela, Gallimard, 2018
- Testamento de sangre, novela, Penguin Random House, 2018
- La Perricholi. Reina de Lima, novela, Penguin Random House, 2019
- Palabras de otro lado, novela, Galaxia Gutemberg, 2019
- Otras caricias, Penguin Random House, 2021
- Diario Los Años. Ediciones Cueto 2023
- Francisca. Princesa del Perú. Penguin Random House 2023

== English translations ==
- The blue hour, Random House UK (April, 2014)
- The wind traveler, University of Texas Press (October, 2020)

== Film Adaptations ==
His novel Grandes Miradas was adapted into a movie (Mariposa Negra) by Francisco Lombardi in 2006. Cueto's novel La Hora Azul/The Blue Hour which won the Herralde Prize in 2006. was published in English in 2012 (translated by Frank Wynne) and was shortlisted for the 2013 Oxford-Weidenfeld Translation Prize and won the Valle Inclán Prize in 2013.

== Reviews ==
- "Alonso Cueto despre scriitori şi cititori". Diario: Ziarul de Duminica. Author: Rodica Grigore
- The Blue Hour by Alonso Cueto. Author: César Ferreira. University of Wisconsin-Milwaukee. World Literature Today.
- The Blue Hour by Alonso Cueto and Frank Wynne.
- Terror, bribery and intrigue: the bloody past fuelling Lima's literary renaissance. The Guardian.
- The Blue Hour. Random House Books.
- Alonso Cueto, The Blue Hour: Storytelling and History. Author: Rodica Grigore.
- Ein Buch pro Frühjahr muss reichen. Frankfurter Allgemeine.
- Leuchtender Pfad ans Ende der Nacht. Frankfurter Allgemeine.
- Past war and cruelty, Peru's writers bloom. The New York Times. Author: Simon Romero.
- From The Wind Traveler. Latin American Literature Today.
- The Wind Traveler. Publishers Weekly.
