= List of awards and nominations received by Ocean Vuong =

Ocean Vuong awards and nominations
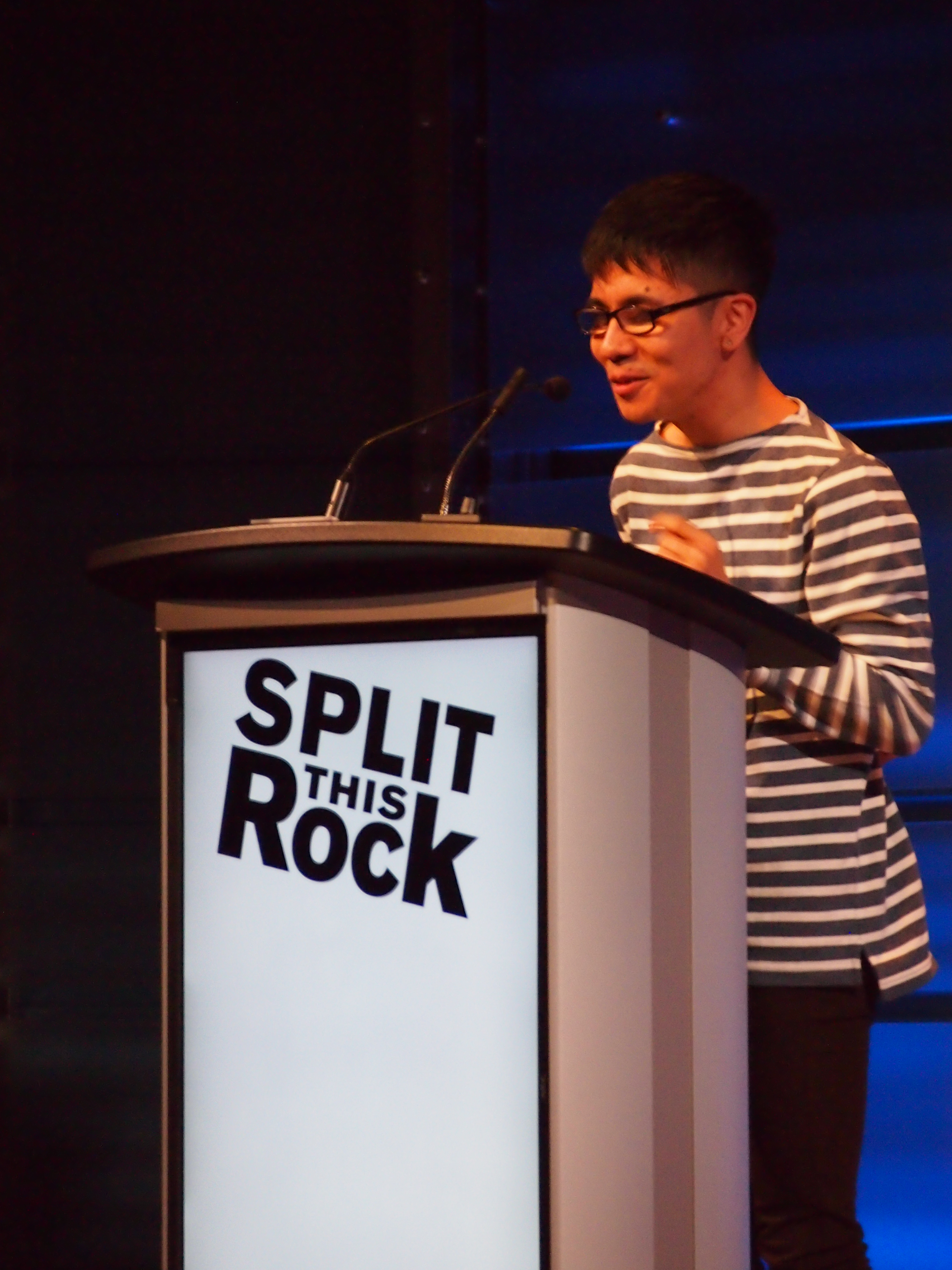
- Vuong at the 2016 Split This Rock
Awards and nominations
Award	Wins	Nominations
Forward Prize	1	1
MacArthur Fellowship	1	1
National Book Award	0	1
Pushcart Prize	1	1
T. S. Eliot Prize	1	1

Ocean Vuong is a Vietnamese-American writer who has received numerous awards and nominations. His three separate poems – Prayer for the Newly Damned, Telemachus, and Self Portrait as Exit Wounds – respectively won the Stanley Kunitz Memorial Prize, the Chad Walsh Poetry Prize, and the Pushcart Prize before being published as a complete collection of poems.

Vuong's poetry collection, Night Sky with Exit Wounds, was one of the New York Times Critics' Top Books of 2016. It's earned him a series of prestigious awards such as the T. S. Eliot Prize, the Thom Gunn Award, the Whiting Award, and the Forward Prize for Best First Collection. The book was also a finalist for the Kate Tufts Discovery Award and the Lambda Literary Awards.

Three years later, Ocean Vuong released his debut novel, On Earth We're Briefly Gorgeous, which continued to earn him many of the first literary awards in his career such as the American Book Awards, the Ferro-Grumley Award, the Mark Twain American Voice in Literature, the Brooklyn Public Library Literary Prize, and the New England Book Award for Fiction. It was named one of the best book of the year by Time, The Washington Post, The New Yorker, The Guardian, Entertainment Weekly, The Wall Street Journal and many more. The book was longlisted for the National Book Award for Fiction, the PEN/Hemingway Award for Debut Novel, the Andrew Carnegie Medal in Fiction, and the Aspen Words Literary Prize. The novel was also a finalist for the Center for Fiction First Novel Prize, the PEN/Faulkner Award for Fiction, the International Dublin Literary Award, the Dylan Thomas Prize, the Kirkus Prize and the Lambda Literary Awards.

In addition to his literary achievements, Vuong also received grants from many organizations to provide financial support throughout his career. In 2014, Vuong was awarded a Ruth Lilly and Dorothy Sargent Rosenberg Poetry Fellowship from the Poetry Foundation. Five years later, he was named a recipient of the MacArthur Fellowship as well as other prestigious scholarships from the Lannan Foundation, Civitella Ranieri Foundation, Elizabeth George Foundation, Kundiman, and Poets House. In 2015, he was named by BuzzFeed as one of the "32 Essential Asian American Writers" and selected by Foreign Policy as a "2016 100 Leading Global Thinker" alongside Hillary Clinton, Ban Ki-moon, and Angela Merkel.

== Literature ==
Organizations (Note: Awards, festivals, honors and other miscellaneous organizations are listed in alphabetical order.)	Year (Note: Indicates the year of ceremony.)	Category	Work	Result	Ref.
Dublin Literary Award	2026	Dublin Literary Award 2026 Shortlist	The Emperor of Gladness	Nominated	
Oprah Book Club	2025	May 2025 Selection	The Emperor of Gladness	Selected	
American Library Association	2020	Andrew Carnegie Medals	On Earth We're Briefly Gorgeous	Longlisted	
American Library Association	2020	Stonewall Book Award for Literature	On Earth We're Briefly Gorgeous	Honored	
Aspen Words	2020	Aspen Words Literary Prize	On Earth We're Briefly Gorgeous	Longlisted	
Before Columbus Foundation	2020	American Book Awards	On Earth We're Briefly Gorgeous	Won	
Beloit Poetry Journal	2013	The Chad Walsh Poetry Prize	Telemachus	Won	
Bibliotekets litteraturpris	2022	Literature for Adults	On Earth We're Briefly Gorgeous	Nominated	
Brooklyn Public Library	2020	Literary Prize for Fiction/Poetry	On Earth We're Briefly Gorgeous	Won	
Claremont Graduate University	2017	Kate Tufts Discovery Award	Night Sky with Exit Wounds	Finalist	
Connecticut Book Awards	2020	Fiction	On Earth We're Briefly Gorgeous	Won	
Digital Book World	2019	Best Book (Fiction)	On Earth We're Briefly Gorgeous	Won	
Dublin City Libraries	2021	International Dublin Literary Award	On Earth We're Briefly Gorgeous	Shortlisted	
Dylan Thomas Prize	2020	Novel	On Earth We're Briefly Gorgeous	Shortlisted	
Forward Prizes for Poetry	2017	Felix Dennis Prize for Best First Collection	Night Sky with Exit Wounds	Won	
Goodreads Choice Awards	2016	Best Poetry	Night Sky with Exit Wounds	Nominated	
Goodreads Choice Awards	2019	Best Debut Novel	On Earth We're Briefly Gorgeous	Nominated	
Goodreads Choice Awards	2019	Best Fiction	On Earth We're Briefly Gorgeous	Nominated	
Goodreads Choice Awards	2022	Best Poetry	Time Is a Mother	Nominated	
Griffin Poetry Prize	2023	Poetry	Time Is a Mother	Shortlisted	
Kirkus Reviews	2019	Kirkus Prize for Fiction	On Earth We're Briefly Gorgeous	Finalist	
Lambda Literary Awards	2017	Gay Poetry	Night Sky with Exit Wounds	Finalist	
Lambda Literary Awards	2020	Gay Fiction	On Earth We're Briefly Gorgeous	Finalist	
Mark Twain House	2020	Mark Twain American Voice in Literature	On Earth We're Briefly Gorgeous	Won	
Massachusetts Book Award	2020	Fiction	On Earth We're Briefly Gorgeous	Won	
National Association of Asian American Professionals	2020	NAAAP Pride Award	—	Honored	
Narrative Magazine	2015	Narrative Prize	No One Knows the Way to Heaven	Won	
National Book Award	2019	Fiction	On Earth We're Briefly Gorgeous	Longlisted	
New England Book Awards	2019	Fiction	On Earth We're Briefly Gorgeous	Won	
PEN America	2020	PEN/Hemingway Award for Debut Novel	On Earth We're Briefly Gorgeous	Longlisted	
PEN/Faulkner Foundation	2020	PEN/Faulkner Award for Fiction	On Earth We're Briefly Gorgeous	Finalist	
Publishing Triangle	2017	Thom Gunn Award	Night Sky with Exit Wounds	Won	
Publishing Triangle	2020	Ferro-Grumley Award	On Earth We're Briefly Gorgeous	Won	
Pushcart Prize	2013	Poetry	Self Portrait as Exit Wounds	Won	
T. S. Eliot Prize	2018	Poetry	Night Sky with Exit Wounds	Won	
The American Poetry Review	2012	Stanley Kunitz Memorial Prize	Prayer for the Newly Damned	Won	
The Center for Fiction	2019	First Novel Prize	On Earth We're Briefly Gorgeous	Shortlisted	
Whiting Award	2016	Poetry	Night Sky with Exit Wounds	Won	

== Career awards ==
=== Fellowship & Grant ===
Organization	Year	Award	Ref.
Academy of American Poets	2010	College Poetry Prize	
Civitella Ranieri Foundation	2016	Fellow	
Elizabeth George Foundation	2014	Fellowship	
Elizabeth George Foundation	2015	Fellowship	
Kundiman	2012	Fellow	
Lannan Literary Awards	2016	Lannan Literary Fellowship	
MacArthur Foundation	2019	MacArthur Fellowship	
Poetry Foundation	2014	Ruth Lilly / Dorothy Sargent Rosenberg Poetry Fellowships	
Poets House	2013	Emerging Poets Fellowship	
United States Artists	2021	USA Fellowships	

=== Residences ===
Organization	Year	Programme	Ref.
Asian/Pacific/American Institute	2019–20	Artist-in-Residence	
Constance Saltonstall Foundation for the Arts	2013	Residency	

=== Listicles ===
Publisher	Category	Year	Ref.
BuzzFeed	32 Essential Asian-American Writers	2015	
Foreign Policy	The Leading Global Thinkers of 2016	2016	
