= The Twin (novel) =

2006 novel by Gerbrand Bakker

- The Twin by Gerbrand Bakker
- Author: Gerbrand Bakker
- Original title: Boven is het stil
- Translator: David Colmer
- Language: Dutch
- Publication date: 2006
- Publication place: Netherlands
- English publication date: 2008

The Twin (Dutch: Boven is het stil, lit. 'it is quiet upstairs') is a novel by Dutch writer Gerbrand Bakker. It won the International Dublin Literary Award in 2010, making Bakker the first Dutch writer to win the award, one of the world's richest literary awards, with a €100,000 prize. Boven is het stil was published in 2006 and its English translation, titled The Twin, followed in 2008. The novel was translated from Dutch by David Colmer. The novel's original Dutch title could be translated as "Upstairs, everything is quiet".

== Background ==
In 2002, Bakker was hiking through mountains while on holiday in Corsica when he first thought up the book. He thought about a son who might "do something terrible to his father" but was left "frustrated" when the idea failed to progress any further until one day he began to write at random.

== Plot summary ==
The novel follows the plight of Helmer, who resides on a Dutch farm with his father. His twin brother, Henk, died accidentally some thirty years earlier, and his mother some years later. The relationship between father and son is strained, as Helmer always thought that his father preferred his twin brother and wanted him to take over the farm. Helmer never married and was tied down to the farm all those years, milking the dairy cows twice a day, every day for decades. His father is now dying, and Helmer encounters his twin brother's former girlfriend, who asks him to help her take care of her teenage son—also named Henk—who is shiftless. The unexpected arrival of a third person in the house changes things and forces Helmer to reflect about his relationship with his father and his dead brother, and to think about his future once his father passes away.

== Major themes ==
The Twin is fundamentally about themes such as loneliness and isolation and the weight of duty.

== Reception ==
Amsterdam, The Hague, Utrecht and Eindhoven libraries nominated The Twin for the International Dublin Literary Award, and the book was declared the winner at the Mansion House in Dublin on 17 June 2010. It defeated 155 titles from more than 40 countries to achieve the award. Lord Mayor of Dublin Emer Costello said Bakker was one of the many "eminent novelists to win this award" and said "this beautifully written Dutch novel will come to the attention of readers worldwide, who might otherwise never have come across it". Instead of giving a speech, Bakker played a tape recording of "Waar is de zon?", the Dutch entry in Eurovision Song Contest 1994 (which also occurred in Dublin).

The Twin was the third consecutive debut novel to win the award, following Man Gone Down and De Niro's Game.

Author J. M. Coetzee describes The Twin as "a novel of restrained tenderness and laconic humour".

Writer Anne Fine said the book "convinces from first page to last".
