= Dublin Literary Award =

International literary award, administered by Dublin City Libraries

- Awarded for: a novel written in or translated into English
- Location: Dublin, Ireland
- Presented by: Dublin City Public Libraries and Archive
- Formerly called: International IMPAC Dublin Literary Award; International Dublin Literary Award
- Reward: €100,000
- First award: 1996

Highlights
- Most awards: 2 – Frank Wynne (translator) in 2002 and 2022
- Most nominations: 4 – Colum McCann (author); 4 – Donal Ryan (author); 3 - Anne McLean (translator)
- Website: www.dublinliteraryaward.ie

The Dublin Literary Award (Irish: Gradam Liteartha Idirnáisiúnta Bhaile Átha Cliath), established as the International IMPAC Dublin Literary Award in 1996 and known as the International Dublin Literary Award (2016–2020), is presented each year for a novel written or translated into English. It promotes excellence in world literature and is solely sponsored by Dublin City Council, Ireland. At €100,000, the award is one of the richest literary prizes in the world. If the winning book is a translation (as it has been twelve times), the prize is divided between the writer and the translator, with the writer receiving €75,000 and the translator €25,000. The first award was made in 1996 to David Malouf for his English-language novel Remembering Babylon.

Nominations are submitted by public libraries worldwide – over 400 library systems in 177 countries worldwide are invited to nominate books each year – from which the shortlist and the eventual winner are selected by an international panel of judges (which changes each year).

== Eligibility and procedure ==
The prize is open to novels written in any language and by authors of any nationality, provided the work has been published in English or English translation. The presentation of the award is post-dated by two years from the date of publication. Thus, to win an award in 2017, the work must have been published in 2015. If it is an English translation, the work must have been published in its original language between two and six years before its translation. The scope for inclusion has been subject to criticism; according to The Irish Times journalist Eileen Battersby, "many of the titles are already well known even at the time of the publication of the long list."

Dublin City Public Libraries seek nominations from 400 public libraries from major cities across the world. Libraries can apply to be considered for inclusion in the nomination process. The longlist is announced in October or November of each year, and the shortlist (up to 10 titles) is announced in March or April of the following year. The longlist and shortlist are chosen by an international panel of judges which rotates each year. Allen Weinstein was the non-voting chair of the panel from 1996 to 2003. As of 2017, the former Chief Judge of the US Court of Appeals, Eugene R. Sullivan, is the non-voting chair. The winner of the award is announced each June.

== History ==
The award was established in 1994 as the International IMPAC Dublin Literary Award, a joint initiative of Dublin City Council and the American productivity company IMPAC, which had its European headquarters in Dublin. James Irwin, president of IMPAC, established the prize money at €100,000. A trust fund was established to pay for the award and its maintenance. The award has been administered by Dublin City Public Libraries since its inception. IMPAC went defunct in the late-2000s when its founder and president James Irwin died in 2009. In late 2013, the trust fund became exhausted and there was no money left to run the award. The council agreed to step in and continue funding the award under the same brand name of the now-defunct company while seeking a new sponsor. It was reported that the council paid €100,000 for the prize plus €80,250 in administration costs in 2015. The award was subsequently renamed the International DUBLIN Literary Award in November 2015. In 2021, it was awarded as the Dublin Literary Award.

Describing the award as "the most eclectic and unpredictable of the literary world's annual gongs", the journalist Michelle Pauli posed the question in relation to the longlist for the 2004 edition: "Where would you find Michael Dobbs and Tony Parsons up against Umberto Eco and Milan Kundera for a €100,000 prize?"

=== Winners and shortlists ===
==== 1990s ====
Dublin Literary Award winners and finalists, 1996–1999
Year	Author	Title	Translator	Language	Result	Ref.
1996	David Malouf	Remembering Babylon	—N/a	English	Winner	
1996	John Banville	Ghosts	—N/a	English	Shortlist	
1996	V. S. Naipaul	A Way in the World	—N/a	English	Shortlist	
1996	Cees Nooteboom	The Following Story; Het volgende verhaal	Ina Rilke	Dutch	Shortlist	
1996	Connie Palmen	The Laws; De wetten	Richard Huijing	Dutch	Shortlist	
1996	José Saramago	The Gospel According to Jesus Christ; O Evangelho segundo Jesus Cristo	Giovanni Pontiero	Portuguese	Shortlist	
1996	Jane Urquhart	Away	—N/a	English	Shortlist	
1997	Javier Marías	A Heart So White; Corazón tan blanco	Margaret Jull Costa	Spanish	Winner	
1997	Sherman Alexie	Reservation Blues	—N/a	English	Shortlist	
1997	Lars Gustafsson	A Tiler's Afternoon; En kakelsättares eftermiddag	Tom Geddes	Swedish	Shortlist	
1997	Dương Thu Hương	Novel Without a Name; Tiểu thuyết vô đề	Huy Duong Phan & Nina McPherson	Vietnamese	Shortlist	
1997	Rohinton Mistry	A Fine Balance	—N/a	English	Shortlist	
1997	Antonio Tabucchi	Pereira Maintains; Sostiene Pereira	Patrick Creagh	Italian	Shortlist	
1997	A. J. Verdelle	The Good Negress	—N/a	English	Shortlist	
1997	Alan Warner	Morvern Callar	—N/a	English	Shortlist	
1998	Herta Müller	The Land of Green Plums; Herztier	Michael Hofmann	German	Winner	
1998	Margaret Atwood	Alias Grace	—N/a	English	Shortlist	
1998	André Brink	Imaginings of Sand; Sandkastele	André Brink	Afrikaans / English	Shortlist	
1998	David Dabydeen	The Counting House	—N/a	English	Shortlist	
1998	David Foster	The Glade Within the Grove	—N/a	English	Shortlist	
1998	Jamaica Kincaid	Autobiography of my Mother	—N/a	English	Shortlist	
1998	Earl Lovelace	Salt	—N/a	English	Shortlist	
1998	Lawrence Norfolk	The Pope's Rhinoceros	—N/a	English	Shortlist	
1998	Graham Swift	Last Orders	—N/a	English	Shortlist	
1998	Guy Vanderhaeghe	The Englishman's Boy	—N/a	English	Shortlist	
1999	Andrew Miller	Ingenious Pain ‡	—N/a	English	Winner	
1999	Jim Crace	Quarantine	—N/a	English	Shortlist	
1999	Don DeLillo	Underworld	—N/a	English	Shortlist	
1999	Francisco Goldman	The Ordinary Seaman	—N/a	English	Shortlist	
1999	Ian McEwan	Enduring Love	—N/a	English	Shortlist	
1999	Haruki Murakami	The Wind-Up Bird Chronicle ねじまき鳥クロニクル	Jay Rubin	Japanese	Shortlist	
1999	Cynthia Ozick	The Puttermesser Papers	—N/a	English	Shortlist	
1999	Bernhard Schlink	The Reader; Der Vorleser	Carol Janeway	German	Shortlist	

==== 2000s ====
Dublin Literary Award winners and finalists, 2000–2009
Year	Author	Title	Translator	Language	Result	Ref.
2000	Nicola Barker	Wide Open	—N/a	English	Winner	
2000	Michael Cunningham	The Hours	—N/a	English	Shortlist	
2000	Jackie Kay	Trumpet	—N/a	English	Shortlist	
2000	Colum McCann	This Side of Brightness	—N/a	English	Shortlist	
2000	Alice McDermott	Charming Billy	—N/a	English	Shortlist	
2000	Toni Morrison	Paradise	—N/a	English	Shortlist	
2000	Philip Roth	I Married a Communist	—N/a	English	Shortlist	
2001	Alistair MacLeod	No Great Mischief	—N/a	English	Winner	
2001	Margaret Cezair-Thompson	The True History of Paradise	—N/a	English	Shortlist	
2001	Silvia Molina	The Love You Promised Me; El amor que me juraste	David Unger	Spanish	Shortlist	
2001	Andrew O'Hagan	Our Fathers	—N/a	English	Shortlist	
2001	Victor Pelevin	The Clay Machine-Gun; Чапаев и Пустота	Andrew Bromfield	Russian	Shortlist	
2001	Colm Tóibín	The Blackwater Lightship	—N/a	English	Shortlist	
2002	Michel Houellebecq	Atomised; Les Particules élémentaires	Frank Wynne	French	Winner	
2002	Margaret Atwood	The Blind Assassin	—N/a	English	Shortlist	
2002	Peter Carey	True History of the Kelly Gang	—N/a	English	Shortlist	
2002	Michael Collins	The Keepers of Truth	—N/a	English	Shortlist	
2002	Helen DeWitt	The Last Samurai	—N/a	English	Shortlist	
2002	Carlos Fuentes	The Years with Laura Diaz; Los años con Laura Díaz	Alfred MacAdam	Spanish	Shortlist	
2002	Antoni Libera	Madame	Agnieszka Kołakowska	Polish	Shortlist	
2003	Orhan Pamuk	My Name Is Red; Benim Adım Kırmızı	Erdağ Göknar	Turkish	Winner	
2003	Dennis Bock	The Ash Garden	—N/a	English	Shortlist	
2003	Achmat Dangor	Bitter Fruit	—N/a	English	Shortlist	
2003	Per Olov Enquist	The Visit of the Royal Physician; Livläkarens besök	Tiina Nunnally	Swedish	Shortlist	
2003	Jonathan Franzen	The Corrections	—N/a	English	Shortlist	
2003	Lídia Jorge	The Migrant Painter of Birds; O Vale da Paixão	Margaret Jull Costa	Portuguese	Shortlist	
2003	John McGahern	That They May Face the Rising Sun	—N/a	English	Shortlist	
2003	Ann Patchett	Bel Canto	—N/a	English	Shortlist	
2004	Tahar Ben Jelloun	This Blinding Absence of Light; Cette aveuglante absence de lumière	Linda Coverdale	French	Winner	
2004	Paul Auster	The Book of Illusions	—N/a	English	Shortlist	
2004	William Boyd	Any Human Heart	—N/a	English	Shortlist	
2004	Sandra Cisneros	Caramelo	—N/a	English	Shortlist	
2004	Jeffrey Eugenides	Middlesex	—N/a	English	Shortlist	
2004	Maggie Gee	The White Family	—N/a	English	Shortlist	
2004	Amin Maalouf	Balthasar's Odyssey; Le Périple de Baldassare	Barbara Bray	French	Shortlist	
2004	Rohinton Mistry	Family Matters	—N/a	English	Shortlist	
2004	Atiq Rahimi	Earth and Ashes خاکستر و خاک	Erdağ Göknar	Persian	Shortlist	
2004	Olga Tokarczuk	House of Day, House of Night; Dom dzienny, dom nocny	Antonia Lloyd-Jones	Polish	Shortlist	
2005	Edward P. Jones	The Known World	—N/a	English	Winner	
2005	Diane Awerbuck	Gardening at Night	—N/a	English	Shortlist	
2005	Lars Saabye Christensen	The Half Brother; Halvbroren	Kenneth Steven	Norwegian	Shortlist	
2005	Damon Galgut	The Good Doctor	—N/a	English	Shortlist	
2005	Douglas Glover	Elle	—N/a	English	Shortlist	
2005	Arnon Grunberg	Phantom Pain; Fantoompijn	Sam Garrett	Dutch	Shortlist	
2005	Shirley Hazzard	The Great Fire	—N/a	English	Shortlist	
2005	Christoph Hein	Willenbrock	Philip Boehm	German	Shortlist	
2005	Frances Itani	Deafening	—N/a	English	Shortlist	
2005	Jonathan Lethem	The Fortress of Solitude	—N/a	English	Shortlist	
2006	Colm Tóibín	The Master	—N/a	English	Winner	
2006	Chris Abani	GraceLand	—N/a	English	Shortlist	
2006	Nadeem Aslam	Maps for Lost Lovers	—N/a	English	Shortlist	
2006	Ronan Bennett	Havoc in Its Third Year	—N/a	English	Shortlist	
2006	Jonathan Coe	The Closed Circle	—N/a	English	Shortlist	
2006	Jens Christian Grøndahl	An Altered Light; Et andet lys	Anne Born	Danish	Shortlist	
2006	Yasmina Khadra	The Swallows of Kabul; Les Hirondelles de Kaboul	John Cullen	French	Shortlist	
2006	Vyvyane Loh	Breaking the Tongue	—N/a	English	Shortlist	
2006	Margaret Mazzantini	Don't Move; Non ti muovere	John Cullen	Italian	Shortlist	
2006	Thomas Wharton	The Logogryph	—N/a	English	Shortlist	
2007	Per Petterson	Out Stealing Horses; Ut og stjæle hester	Anne Born	Norwegian	Winner	
2007	Julian Barnes	Arthur & George	—N/a	English	Shortlist	
2007	Sebastian Barry	A Long Long Way	—N/a	English	Shortlist	
2007	J. M. Coetzee	Slow Man	—N/a	English	Shortlist	
2007	Jonathan Safran Foer	Extremely Loud & Incredibly Close	—N/a	English	Shortlist	
2007	Peter Hobbs	The Short Day Dying	—N/a	English	Shortlist	
2007	Cormac McCarthy	No Country for Old Men	—N/a	English	Shortlist	
2007	Salman Rushdie	Shalimar the Clown	—N/a	English	Shortlist	
2008	Rawi Hage	De Niro's Game ‡	—N/a	English	Winner	
2008	Javier Cercas	The Speed of Light; La velocidad de la luz	Anne McLean	Spanish	Shortlist	
2008	Yasmine Gooneratne	The Sweet & Simple Kind	—N/a	English	Shortlist	
2008	Gail Jones	Dreams of Speaking	—N/a	English	Shortlist	
2008	Sayed Kashua	Let It Be Morning ויהי בוקר	Miriam Shlesinger	Hebrew	Shortlist	
2008	Yasmina Khadra	The Attack; L'Attentat	John Cullen	French	Shortlist	
2008	Andreï Makine	The Woman Who Waited; La femme qui attendait	Geoffrey Strachan	French	Shortlist	
2008	Patrick McCabe	Winterwood	—N/a	English	Shortlist	
2009	Michael Thomas	Man Gone Down ‡	—N/a	English	Winner	
2009	Junot Díaz	The Brief Wondrous Life of Oscar Wao	—N/a	English	Shortlist	
2009	Jean Echenoz	Ravel	Linda Coverdale	French	Shortlist	
2009	Mohsin Hamid	The Reluctant Fundamentalist	—N/a	English	Shortlist	
2009	Travis Holland	The Archivist's Story	—N/a	English	Shortlist	
2009	Roy Jacobsen	The Burnt-Out Town of Miracles; Hoggerne	Don Shaw & Don Bartlett	Norwegian	Shortlist	
2009	David Leavitt	The Indian Clerk	—N/a	English	Shortlist	
2009	Indra Sinha	Animal's People	—N/a	English	Shortlist	

==== 2010s ====
Dublin Literary Award winners and finalists, 2010–2019
Year	Author	Title	Translator	Language	Result	Ref.
2010	Gerbrand Bakker	The Twin; Boven is het stil	David Colmer	Dutch	Winner	
2010	Muriel Barbery	The Elegance of the Hedgehog; L'Élégance du hérisson	Alison Anderson	French	Shortlist	
2010	Robert Edric	In Zodiac Light	—N/a	English	Shortlist	
2010	Christoph Hein	Settlement; Landnahme	Philip Boehm	German	Shortlist	
2010	Zoë Heller	The Believers	—N/a	English	Shortlist	
2010	Joseph O'Neill	Netherland	—N/a	English	Shortlist	
2010	Ross Raisin	God's Own Country	—N/a	English	Shortlist	
2010	Marilynne Robinson	Home	—N/a	English	Shortlist	
2011	Colum McCann	Let the Great World Spin	—N/a	English	Winner	
2011	Michael Crummey	Galore	—N/a	English	Shortlist	
2011	Barbara Kingsolver	The Lacuna	—N/a	English	Shortlist	
2011	Yiyun Li	The Vagrants	—N/a	English	Shortlist	
2011	David Malouf	Ransom	—N/a	English	Shortlist	
2011	Joyce Carol Oates	Little Bird of Heaven	—N/a	English	Shortlist	
2011	Craig Silvey	Jasper Jones	—N/a	English	Shortlist	
2011	Colm Tóibín	Brooklyn	—N/a	English	Shortlist	
2011	William Trevor	Love and Summer	—N/a	English	Shortlist	
2011	Evie Wyld	After the Fire, A Still Small Voice	—N/a	English	Shortlist	
2012	Jon McGregor	Even the Dogs	—N/a	English	Winner	
2012	Jon Bauer	Rocks in the Belly	—N/a	English	Shortlist	
2012	David Bergen	The Matter with Morris	—N/a	English	Shortlist	
2012	Jennifer Egan	A Visit from the Goon Squad	—N/a	English	Shortlist	
2012	Aminatta Forna	The Memory of Love	—N/a	English	Shortlist	
2012	Karl Marlantes	Matterhorn	—N/a	English	Shortlist	
2012	Tim Pears	Landed	—N/a	English	Shortlist	
2012	Yishai Sarid	Limassol לימסול	Barbara Harshav	Hebrew	Shortlist	
2012	Cristóvão Tezza	The Eternal Son; O Filho Eterno	Alison Entrekin	Portuguese	Shortlist	
2012	Willy Vlautin	Lean on Pete	—N/a	English	Shortlist	
2013	Kevin Barry	City of Bohane	—N/a	English	Winner	
2013	Michel Houellebecq	The Map and the Territory; La carte et le territoire	Gavin Bowd	French	Shortlist	
2013	Andrew Miller	Pure	—N/a	English	Shortlist	
2013	Haruki Murakami	1Q84	Jay Rubin & Philip Gabriel	Japanese	Shortlist	
2013	Julie Otsuka	The Buddha in the Attic	—N/a	English	Shortlist	
2013	Arthur Phillips	The Tragedy of Arthur	—N/a	English	Shortlist	
2013	Karen Russell	Swamplandia!	—N/a	English	Shortlist	
2013	Sjón	From the Mouth of the Whale; Rökkurbýsnir	Victoria Cribb	Icelandic	Shortlist	
2013	Kjersti Annesdatter Skomsvold	The Faster I Walk, the Smaller I Am; Jo fortere jeg går, jo mindre er jeg	Kerri Pierce	Norwegian	Shortlist	
2013	Tommy Wieringa	Caesarion	Sam Garrett	Dutch	Shortlist	
2014	Juan Gabriel Vásquez	The Sound of Things Falling; El ruido de las cosas al caer	Anne McLean	Spanish	Winner	
2014	Gerbrand Bakker	The Detour; De omweg	David Colmer	Dutch	Shortlist	
2014	Michelle de Kretser	Questions of Travel	—N/a	English	Shortlist	
2014	Tan Twan Eng	The Garden of Evening Mists	—N/a	English	Shortlist	
2014	Patrick Flanery	Absolution	—N/a	English	Shortlist	
2014	Karl Ove Knausgård	My Struggle 1: A Death in the Family; Min kamp 1	Don Bartlett	Norwegian	Shortlist	
2014	Marie NDiaye	Three Strong Women; Trois Femmes puissantes	John Fletcher	French	Shortlist	
2014	Andrés Neuman	Traveller of the Century; El viajero del siglo	Nick Caistor & Lorenza Garcia	Spanish	Shortlist	
2014	David Park	The Light of Amsterdam	—N/a	English	Shortlist	
2014	Donal Ryan	The Spinning Heart	—N/a	English	Shortlist	
2015	Jim Crace	Harvest	—N/a	English	Winner	
2015	Chimamanda Ngozi Adichie	Americanah	—N/a	English	Shortlist	
2015	Mahi Binebine	Horses of God; Les étoiles de Sidi Moumen	Lulu Norman	French	Shortlist	
2015	Richard Flanagan	The Narrow Road to the Deep North	—N/a	English	Shortlist	
2015	Hannah Kent	Burial Rites	—N/a	English	Shortlist	
2015	Bernardo Kucinski	K.	Sue Branford	Portuguese	Shortlist	
2015	Andreï Makine	Brief Loves That Live Forever; Le Livre des brèves amours éternelles	Geoffrey Strachan	French	Shortlist	
2015	Colum McCann	TransAtlantic	—N/a	English	Shortlist	
2015	Alice McDermott	Someone	—N/a	English	Shortlist	
2015	Roxana Robinson	Sparta	—N/a	English	Shortlist	
2016	Akhil Sharma	Family Life	—N/a	English	Winner	
2016	Javier Cercas	Outlaws; Las leyes de la frontera	Anne McLean	Spanish	Shortlist	
2016	Mary Costello	Academy Street	—N/a	English	Shortlist	
2016	Dave Eggers	Your Fathers, Where Are They? And the Prophets, Do They Live Forever?	—N/a	English	Shortlist	
2016	Jenny Erpenbeck	The End of Days; Aller Tage Abend	Susan Bernofsky	German	Shortlist	
2016	Marlon James	A Brief History of Seven Killings	—N/a	English	Shortlist	
2016	Michel Laub	Diary of the Fall; Diário da Queda	Margaret Jull Costa	Portuguese	Shortlist	
2016	Scholastique Mukasonga	Our Lady of the Nile; Notre-Dame du Nil	Melanie Mauthner	French	Shortlist	
2016	Jenny Offill	Dept. of Speculation	—N/a	English	Shortlist	
2016	Marilynne Robinson	Lila	—N/a	English	Shortlist	
2017	José Eduardo Agualusa	A General Theory of Oblivion; Teoria Geral do Esquecimento	Daniel Hahn	Portuguese	Winner	
2017	Mia Couto	Confession of the Lioness; A Confissão da Leoa	David Brookshaw	Portuguese	Shortlist	
2017	Anne Enright	The Green Road	—N/a	English	Shortlist	
2017	Kim Leine	The Prophets of Eternal Fjord; Profeterne i Evighedsfjorden	Martin Aitken	Danish	Shortlist	
2017	Valeria Luiselli	The Story of My Teeth; La historia de mis dientes	Christina MacSweeney	Spanish	Shortlist	
2017	Viet Thanh Nguyen	The Sympathizer	—N/a	English	Shortlist	
2017	Chinelo Okparanta	Under the Udala Trees	—N/a	English	Shortlist	
2017	Orhan Pamuk	A Strangeness in My Mind; Kafamda Bir Tuhaflık	Ekin Oklap	Turkish	Shortlist	
2017	Robert Seethaler	A Whole Life; Ein ganzes Leben	Charlotte Collins	German	Shortlist	
2017	Hanya Yanagihara	A Little Life	—N/a	English	Shortlist	
2018	Mike McCormack	Solar Bones	—N/a	English	Winner	
2018	Alina Bronsky	Baba Dunja's Last Love; Baba Dunjas letzte Liebe	Tim Mohr	German	Shortlist	
2018	Yuri Herrera	The Transmigration of Bodies; La transmigración de los cuerpos	Lisa Dillman	Spanish	Shortlist	
2018	Roy Jacobsen	The Unseen; De usynlige	Don Bartlett & Don Shaw	Norwegian	Shortlist	
2018	Han Kang	Human Acts 소년이 온다	Deborah Smith	Korean	Shortlist	
2018	Eimear McBride	The Lesser Bohemians	—N/a	English	Shortlist	
2018	Antonio Moresco	Distant Light; La lucina	Richard Dixon	Italian	Shortlist	
2018	Marie NDiaye	Ladivine	Jordan Stump	French	Shortlist	
2018	Yewande Omotoso	The Woman Next Door	—N/a	English	Shortlist	
2018	Elizabeth Strout	My Name Is Lucy Barton	—N/a	English	Shortlist	
2019	Emily Ruskovich	Idaho ‡	—N/a	English	Winner	
2019	Mathias Énard	Compass; Boussole	Charlotte Mandell	French	Shortlist	
2019	Emily Fridlund	History of Wolves	—N/a	English	Shortlist	
2019	Mohsin Hamid	Exit West	—N/a	English	Shortlist	
2019	Bernard MacLaverty	Midwinter Break	—N/a	English	Shortlist	
2019	Jon McGregor	Reservoir 13	—N/a	English	Shortlist	
2019	Sally Rooney	Conversations with Friends	—N/a	English	Shortlist	
2019	George Saunders	Lincoln in the Bardo	—N/a	English	Shortlist	
2019	Rachel Seiffert	A Boy in Winter	—N/a	English	Shortlist	
2019	Kamila Shamsie	Home Fire	—N/a	English	Shortlist	

==== 2020s ====
Dublin Literary Award winners and Shortlists, 2020–present
Year	Author	Title	Translator	Language	Result	Ref.
2020	Anna Burns	Milkman	Winner			
2020	Pat Barker	The Silence of the Girls	—N/a	English	Shortlist	
2020	Négar Djavadi	Disoriental; Désorientale	Tina Kover	French	Shortlist	
2020	Esi Edugyan	Washington Black	—N/a	English	Shortlist	
2020	Tayari Jones	An American Marriage	—N/a	English	Shortlist	
2020	Édouard Louis	History of Violence; Histoire de la violence	Lorin Stein	French	Shortlist	
2020	Sigrid Nunez	The Friend	—N/a	English	Shortlist	
2020	Tommy Orange	There There	—N/a	English	Shortlist	
2020	Anuradha Roy	All the Lives We Never Lived	—N/a	English	Shortlist	
2020	Olga Tokarczuk	Drive Your Plow Over the Bones of the Dead; Prowadź swój pług przez kości umarłych	Antonia Lloyd-Jones	Polish	Shortlist	
2021	Valeria Luiselli	Lost Children Archive	—N/a	English	Winner	
2021	Bernardine Evaristo	Girl, Woman, Other	—N/a	English	Shortlist	
2021	Colum McCann	Apeirogon	—N/a	English	Shortlist	
2021	Fernanda Melchor	Hurricane Season; Temporada de huracanes	Sophie Hughes	Spanish	Shortlist	
2021	Ocean Vuong	On Earth We're Briefly Gorgeous	—N/a	English	Shortlist	
2021	Colson Whitehead	The Nickel Boys	—N/a	English	Shortlist	
2022	Alice Zeniter	The Art of Losing; L'Art de perdre	Frank Wynne	French	Winner	
2022	Catherine Chidgey	Remote Sympathy	—N/a	English	Shortlist	
2022	David Diop	At Night All Blood Is Black; Frère d'âme	Anna Moschovakis	French	Shortlist	
2022	Akwaeke Emezi	The Death of Vivek Oji	—N/a	English	Shortlist	
2022	Danielle McLaughlin	The Art of Falling	—N/a	English	Shortlist	
2022	Leanne Betasamosake Simpson	Noopiming: The Cure for White Ladies	—N/a	English	Shortlist	
2023	Katja Oskamp	Marzahn, Mon Amour; Marzahn, mon amour: Geschichten einer Fußpflegerin	Jo Heinrich	German	Winner	
2023	Anthony Doerr	Cloud Cuckoo Land	—N/a	English	Shortlist	
2023	Percival Everett	The Trees	—N/a	English	Shortlist	
2023	Fernanda Melchor	Paradais; Páradais	Sophie Hughes	Spanish	Shortlist	
2023	Ivana Sajko	Love Novel; Ljubavni roman	Mima Simić	Croatian	Shortlist	
2023	Kim Thuy	Em	Sheila Fischman	French	Shortlist	
2024	Mircea Cărtărescu	Solenoid	Sean Cotter	Romanian	Winner	
2024	Sebastian Barry	Old God's Time	—N/a	English	Shortlist	
2024	Emma Donoghue	Haven	—N/a	English	Shortlist	
2024	Jonathan Escoffery	If I Survive You	—N/a	English	Shortlist	
2024	Suzette Mayr	The Sleeping Car Porter	—N/a	English	Shortlist	
2024	Alexis Wright	Praiseworthy	—N/a	English	Shortlist	
2025	Michael Crummey	The Adversary	—N/a	English	Winner	
2025	Percival Everett	James	—N/a	English	Shortlist	
2025	Daniel Mason	North Woods	—N/a	English	Shortlist	
2025	Selva Almada	Not a River; No es un río	Annie McDermott	Spanish	Shortlist	
2025	Paul Lynch	Prophet Song	—N/a	English	Shortlist	
2025	Gerda Blees	We Are Light; Wij zijn licht	Michele Hutchison	Dutch	Shortlist	
2026	Ali Smith	Gliff	—N/a	English	Winner	
2026	Laurent Binet	Perspective(s)	Sam Taylor	French	Shortlist	
2026	Magdalena Blažević	In Late Summer; U kasno ljeto	Anđelka Raguž	Croatian	Shortlist	
2026	Éric Chacour	What I Know About You; Ce que je sais de toi	Pablo Strauss	French	Shortlist	
2026	Brigitte Giraud	Live Fast; Vivre vite	Cory Stockwell	French	Shortlist	
2026	Ocean Vuong	The Emperor of Gladness	—N/a	English	Shortlist	

- ‡ – debut novel

=== Wins by language ===
Total	Language	Years
19	English	1996, 1999, 2000, 2001, 2005, 2006, 2008, 2009, 2011, 2012, 2013, 2015, 2016, 2018, 2019, 2020, 2021, 2025, 2026
3	French	2002, 2004, 2022
2	Spanish	1997, 2014
2	German	1998, 2023
1	Turkish	2003
1	Norwegian	2007
1	Dutch	2010
1	Portuguese	2017
1	Romanian	2024
