= Anne Born =

British poet, local historian, writer and translator

- Born: Anne Rosemary Cookes; 9 July 1924; London, England
- Died: 27 July 2011 (aged 87)
- Occupations: Poet, local historian, writer and translator
- Spouse: Povl Born
- Children: Conrad, Christopher, Caroline, Crispin
- Writing career
- Notable work: Out Stealing Horses (translation)
- Notable awards: Independent Foreign Fiction Prize; International Dublin Literary Award

Anne Born (9 July 1924 – 27 July 2011) was a British poet, local historian, writer and translator.

== Biography ==
Anne Rosemary Cookes was born in south London on 9 July 1924. She joined the First Aid Nursing Yeomanry during the Second World War, and taught Morse code at the SOE at Grendon Underwood, Bucks, where she met Povl Born, a Danish air force pilot. In 1946 they married and moved to Copenhagen, where she studied English literature at the university. She became fluent in Danish, Norwegian, and Swedish.

She began writing poetry and, at the same time, began translating Scandinavian writers into English, such as Hans Christian Andersen, Karen Blixen, Jens Christian Grøndahl, Per Petterson, Michael Larsen, Janne Teller, Stig Holmas, Carsten Jensen, Sissel Lie, Henrik Stangerup, and Knud Hjortø.

In the 1980s, she moved to Salcombe, Devon, where she wrote books on local history. She founded the poetry publisher Overstep Books in 1992, and ran it until 2008.

== Recognition ==
For her translation of Per Petterson's Ut og stjæle hester as Out Stealing Horses, she won the Independent Foreign Fiction Prize and the International Dublin Literary Award.

In 2013, the Poetry Society established a prize, the Anne Born Prize, in her memory. In its first year it was judged by Penelope Shuttle and won by Suzanne Batty.
