= Michael Thomas (Man Gone Down author) =

American author

- Born: Boston, Massachusetts, U.S.
- Education: Hunter College; Warren Wilson College (MFA)
- Occupation: Author
- Children: Three
- Writing career
- Notable works: Man Gone Down; The Broken King
- Notable awards: International Dublin Literary Award (2009)

Michael Thomas is an American author. He won the 2009 International Dublin Literary Award for his debut novel Man Gone Down, receiving a prize of €100,000. Man Gone Down is also recommended by The New York Times.

His debut memoir, The Broken King, was longlisted for the 2025 National Book Critics Circle Award for Autobiography.

== Early and personal life ==
Thomas was born and raised in Boston. He earned a bachelor's degree at Hunter College in New York City, and an MFA in Creative Writing at Warren Wilson College. He currently lives in Brooklyn, New York and is a professor of English at Hunter College. He claims to have never had a proper job although he has worked in several areas, including bars, restaurants, construction, pizza delivery, on film sets and driving a taxi. Thomas is divorced and has three children.

== Writing career ==
Prior to his international success as a novelist, Thomas wrote poetry and performed in the capacity of a singer-songwriter. Later, whilst attending graduate school, he studied a fiction program, with his thesis being a collection of short stories. One of these short stories became his debut novel.

His writing has appeared in A Public Space, the New York Times, The New Yorker, and Ben George’s anthology The Book of Dads.

=== Man Gone Down ===
"One day I was doing my laundry and I realised the breaks were chapters, not pages, and I started writing a novel," Thomas said. "I write to images, or lines, and the end came to me – the last two paragraphs, the last line. I was always writing to it. I had to get there."

— Thomas, on constructing Man Gone Down.

Thomas's debut novel, Man Gone Down, won the 2009 International Dublin Literary Award on 11 June 2009. The prize, which is the richest literary award in the world (apart from the Nobel Prize in Literature) and is open to novels written in all languages, was €100,000 (£85,000, US$140,000). Thomas was the third author to win with a debut novel, following Andrew Miller's Ingenious Pain (1999) and Rawi Hage's De Niro's Game (2007).

The book was praised by the judges, who included James Ryan, for its "energy and warmth" and for being "tuned urgently to the way we live now". Thomas said he had been "feeling a little desperate" during the writing of it. Man Gone Down beat an international longlist of 147 titles from 41 countries, as well as seven other shortlisted nominations such as The Brief Wondrous Life of Oscar Wao by Junot Díaz and The Reluctant Fundamentalist by Mohsin Hamid, as well as novels by established authors such as Doris Lessing, Joyce Carol Oates and Philip Roth. It was nominated by the National Library Service of Barbados. In 2007, Man Gone Down was named in the top ten of a list by The New York Times.

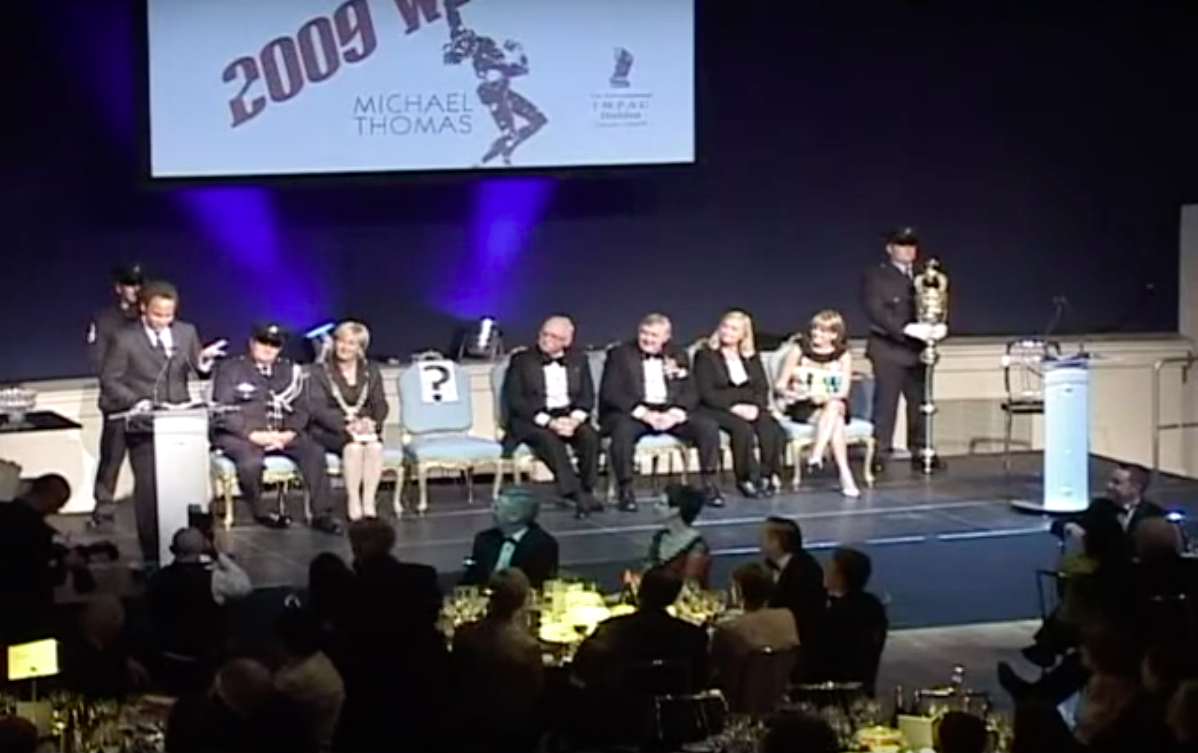
Thomas receiving the International Dublin Literary Award in 2009

Thomas attended the prize ceremony in Dublin, saying he was "stunned" and "still waiting for the punch line". He expressed his disbelief that he had even made the shortlist – "or the longlist, for that matter". He expects to "pay some bills" with the money as well as "a mortgage, a half-built house".

The novel deals with an African-American man who is estranged from his white wife and their children. He must come up with a sum of money within four days to have them returned. It focuses on an attempt to achieve the American Dream. Thomas describes Man Gone Down as having a "gallows humour".

== Bibliography ==
=== Novel ===
- Man Gone Down: A Novel. Grove/Atlantic, Inc. 2006. ISBN 9780802170293.

=== Nonfiction ===
- The Broken King: A Memoir. Grove/Atlantic, Inc. 2025. ISBN 9780802120144.

=== Anthology appearances ===
- Ben George, ed. (2009). The Book of Dads. HarperCollins. ISBN 9780061711558.
