= Travis Holland =

American writer

Travis Holland is an American writer. His work has appeared in Ploughshares, Glimmer Train and Five Points, and his debut novel The Archivist's Story was nominated for the International Dublin Literary Award. He holds an MFA from the University of Michigan where he twice received the Hopwood Award.

== Bibliography ==
- The Archivist's Story (2007), ISBN 978-0-7475-9320-1
