= Gerbrand Bakker (novelist) =

Dutch writer (born 1962)

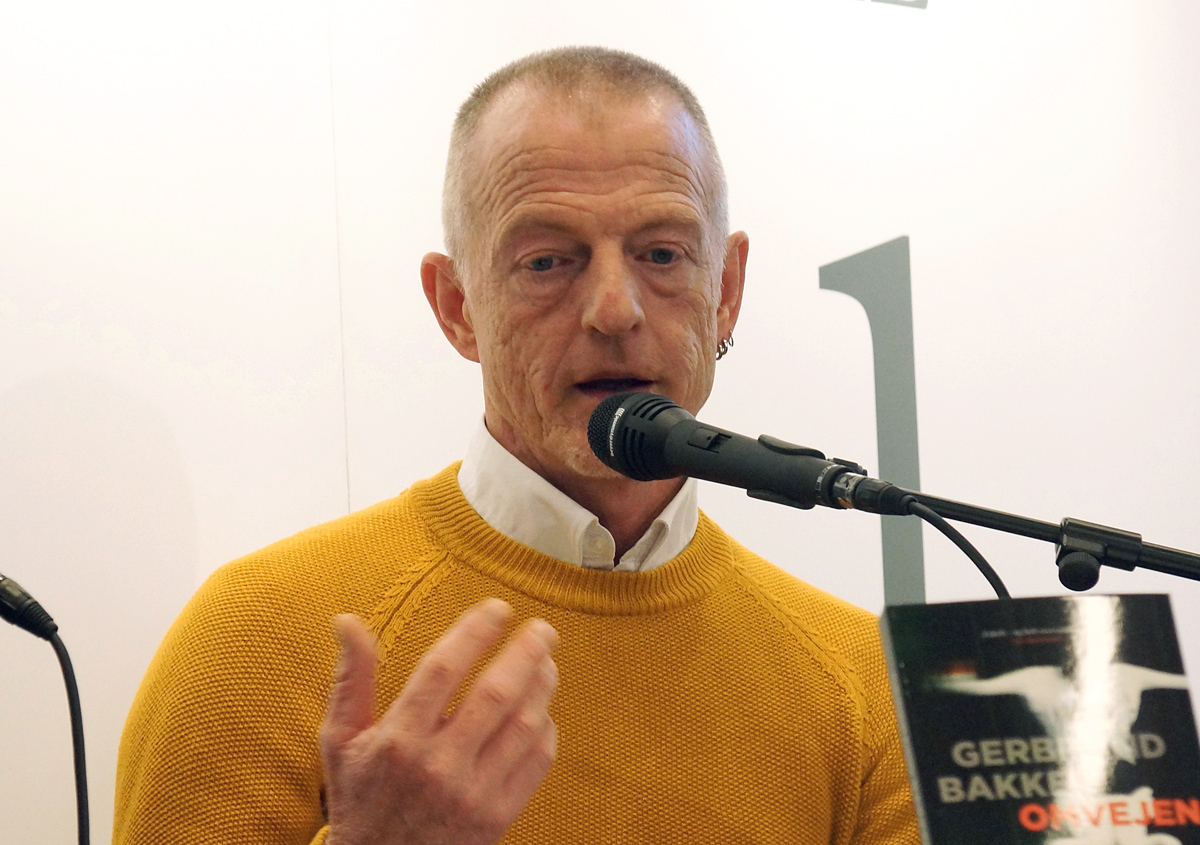
- Born: 28 April 1962 (age 64); Wieringerwaard, Netherlands
- Occupation: Gardener
- Writing career
- Notable works: The Twin, The Detour
- Notable awards: International Dublin Literary Award; 2010; Independent Foreign Fiction Prize; 2013

Signature
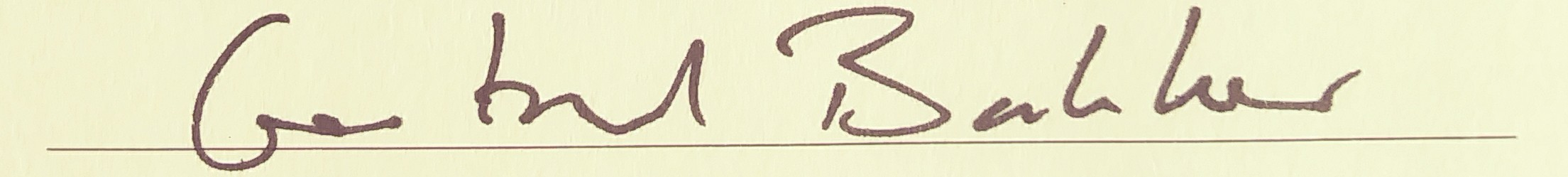

Gerbrand Bakker (born 28 April 1962) is a Dutch writer. He won the International Dublin Literary Award for The Twin, the English translation of his novel Boven is het stil, and the Independent Foreign Fiction Prize for The Detour, the English translation of his novel De omweg. Both novels were translated by co-winner David Colmer.

== Biography ==
Bakker is a gardener by trade, having acquired his gardening license in 2006. He says writing and gardening are compatible. Bakker works as a skating instructor in winter.

He has previously worked as a subtitler for Dutch TV, particularly on the U.S. soap opera The Bold and the Beautiful. Bakker has said: "They blabber and blabber, but you only have seven seconds for a subtitle on screen. That's what The Bold and the Beautiful taught me. I learned to leave things out." Among his favourite books are The Sea, the Sea, The Beautiful Room Is Empty, Winnie-the-Pooh and The Wind in the Willows. He dislikes flying.

== Works ==
Available in English translation by Bakker are Boven is het stil and De omweg. Among Bakker's other works are a children's dictionary and Pear Trees Bloom White, a young adult novel.

=== The Twin ===
In 2002 Bakker was hiking through mountains whilst on holiday in Corsica when he first thought up The Twin. He thought about a son who might "do something terrible to his father" but was left "frustrated" when the idea failed to progress any further until one day he began to write at random. Boven is het stil was published in 2006 and its English translation, titled The Twin, followed in 2008. The novel's Dutch title could be translated as "Upstairs, everything is quiet."

Amsterdam, The Hague, Utrecht and Eindhoven libraries all nominated The Twin for the International Dublin Literary Award. Bakker received it in Dublin on 17 June 2010. He was the first Dutch writer to win the prize, the world's most lucrative individual literary award, with a €100,000 prize. The Twin defeated 155 titles from more than 40 countries. The judges said his writing was "wonderful: restrained and clear" and that Bakker "excels at dialogue". The Twin has also received praise from J. M. Coetzee. Bakker spoke of the need "to lie down for a while" when he was announced as the winner and said "It's wonderful". Opting not to give a speech he instead played a tape recording of "Waar is de zon?", the Dutch entry in Eurovision Song Contest 1994 (which also occurred in Dublin).

Bakker credited David Colmer with helping "me realise it really is a book, and I am a writer". Colmer translated the book from its original Dutch into the English language and received €25,000 of the prize money for his efforts. Bakker said he planned to buy a Dutch grey horse with his money as "I just love these big beasts".

=== The Detour ===
De omweg, Bakker's third adult novel was published in October 2010 and later translated into English as The Detour, again by David Colmer. It is a study in self-searching, self-assertion and the nature of pain, narrated by a middle-aged Dutchwoman who has fled her husband to live in the solitude of rural Wales. It won the Independent Foreign Fiction Prize (2013).

According to Bakker, The Detour came from a "hugely depressed" time in his life. "I write instinctively. Something wants to come out. Only now do I see that this book is terribly much about myself. I write from the back of my mind. I don't see what I'm doing."

=== June ===
June is Bakker's second adult novel, published in Dutch in 2009. It was translated by David Colmer and published in English in 2015.
