= Out Stealing Horses =

2003 Norwegian novel by Per Petterson

- First edition (Norway)
- Author: Per Petterson
- Original title: Ut og stjæle hester
- Translator: Anne Born
- Language: Norwegian
- Publisher: Forlaget Oktober (Norway); Harvill Secker (UK); Graywolf Press (USA),
- Publication date: 2003
- Publication place: Norway
- English publication date: April 2007 (USA), November 2005 (UK)
- Media type: Print (Hardback & Paperback)
- Pages: 240pp (UK hardback)
- ISBN: 1-84343-229-3 (UK), 1555974708 (USA)
- OCLC: 61702863

Out Stealing Horses (Norwegian: Ut og stjæle hester) is a 2003 Norwegian novel by Per Petterson. It was translated into English in 2005 by Anne Born and published in the UK that year. It was published in the US in 2007. Among other awards it won the 2007 Dublin IMPAC Award, one of the richest literary prizes in the world.

Out Stealing Horses has double meanings and features two sets of twins. When asked, “How did the Nazi Occupation of Norway translate into the plot of your novel?” Mr. Petterson responded, “Well, like I said, I do not plan, so that double meaning came up when I needed it. That is disappointing to some readers, I know. But for me it shows the strength of art. It is like carving out a sculpture from some material. You have to go with the quality of the material and not force upon it a form that it will not yield to anyway. That will only look awkward. Early in the book, in the 1948 part, I let the two fathers (of my main characters, Jon and Trond) have a problem with looking at each other. And I wondered, why is that? So I thought, well, it’s 1948, only three years after the Germans left Norway. It has to be something with the war. And then I thought, shit, I have to write about the war. You see, I hate research.”

== Characters ==
- Trond Tobias Sander – The story's narrator and main character. He is 15 years old in the summer of 1948, and 67 in 1999.
- Jon Haug – Trond's friend in the summer of 1948. He is 15 years old that summer.
- Lars Haug – Younger brother of Jon and twin of Odd. He is 10 years old in the summer of 1948. Also, Trond's neighbor in the later episode.
- Odd Haug – Younger brother of Jon and the twin of Lars. He is 10 years old in the summer of 1948.
- Jon's father
- Jon's mother
- Trond's father
- Trond's mother
- Barkald – The owner of a nearby farm with horses. “The biggest landowner in the district.”
- Olav – The mechanic in the later episode.
- The Dairy Maid - Worker on a dairy near the cottage.
- Ellen Sander – Trond's eldest daughter.
- Uncle Arne – A brother of Trond's mother. A twin of Uncle Amund.
- Uncle Amund – A brother of Trond's mother. A twin of Uncle Arne.
- Franz – A friend of Trond's father's, who lives near the cottage.

== Animals ==
- Bramina – The Haug's horse, mentioned in 1944 and in the summer of 1948.
- Brona – Barkald's horse that he loans to Trond's father for helping with his hay making.
- Lyra – Trond's dog in the later episode.
- Poker – Lars’ dog in the later episode.
- Jakob - Name for fish that Trond's father uses.

== Plot ==
Out Stealing Horses is the story of Norwegian man Trond Sanders, aged 67, who goes to live quietly in a cottage in a remote part of Norway in 1999. He meets a neighbour, Lars, whom he recognises from when they were boys, and this leads him to reflect on events that happened when he was a teen. The novel has flashbacks to WWII when the Germans occupied Norway, and 1948, when Trond was 15 and Lars was 10. In 1948, Trond’s best friend is Lars’ brother Jon, who takes him “out stealing horses” one morning (actually, the boys are riding a local man’s horses, not stealing them). Trond later finds out that the previous day, Jon had been shooting hares and had forgotten to unload his gun when he came home. Lars had picked up the gun, not knowing it was loaded, and shot and killed his twin brother Odd.

After this, Jon leaves the village and Trond does not know where he has gone or what happened to him. He later finds out that Jon has become a sailor. Trond’s father cuts down his spruce trees and puts them in the river to float to a sawmill in Sweden. He later takes Trond out on horseback, and they experience a closeness they have not felt before. Shortly after this, Trond’s father leaves, never to return. Trond had earlier seen him kissing Jon’s mother. Trond and his mother go to Sweden to get the money from the timber, and she buys him a suit. Trond finds out that during the war, his father and Jon’s mother were part of the Resistance, working with others to smuggle people and documents over the border to neutral Sweden. One time, German soldiers find Jon’s mother rowing a man across the river, and shoot him. Jon’s mother and Trond’s father disappear to Sweden, and Trond doesn’t see his father again until after the war.

== Critical reception ==
In the original language the novel won the Norwegian Booksellers' Prize, and in English (translation by Anne Born) it won the Independent Foreign Fiction Prize and the 2007 Dublin IMPAC Award, one of the richest literary prizes in the world. Time magazine's Lev Grossman named it one of the Top 10 Fiction Books of 2007, ranking it at #4, and praising it as a "page-turner". It was shortlisted for the 2008 Best Translated Book Award.

== See also ==
- 2003 in literature
- Norwegian literature
