= I Curse the River of Time =

Book by Per Petterson

- First edition
- Author: Per Petterson
- Original title: Jeg forbanner tidens elv
- Translator: Charlotte Barslund
- Language: Norwegian
- Publisher: Forlaget Oktober
- Publication date: 2008
- Publication place: Norway
- English publication date: 2010
- Pages: 234
- ISBN: 978-82-495-0595-1

I Curse the River of Time (Norwegian: Jeg forbanner tidens elv) is a 2008 novel by the Norwegian writer Per Petterson. The narrative is set in 1989 against the backdrop of a communist Europe. The story revolves around Arvid Jansen, the protagonist, and his relationship with his mother, who has recently been diagnosed with cancer. The book received the Nordic Council Literature Prize in 2009.

== See also ==
- 2008 in literature
- Norwegian literature
