= The Detour (novel) =

2010 novel by Gerbrand Bakker

- Author: Gulbrand Bakker

The Detour (De omweg) is the third adult novel by Dutch writer Gerbrand Bakker. It was published in October 2010 and later translated into English by David Colmer as The Detour (U.S. edition: "Ten White Geese"). It is a study in self-searching, self-assertion and the nature of pain, narrated by a middle-aged Dutchwoman who has fled her husband to live in the solitude of rural Wales. She sometimes watches Escape to the Country.

According to Bakker, The Detour came from a "hugely depressed" time in his life. "I write instinctively. Something wants to come out. Only now do I see that this book is terribly much about myself. I write from the back of my mind. I don't see what I'm doing."

The Detour won the Independent Foreign Fiction Prize (2013), and was one of eight finalists for the International Dublin Literary Award (2014).
