= Time Is a Mother =

Poetry collection by Ocean Vuong

- Author: Ocean Vuong
- Publisher: Penguin Press
- Publication date: April 5, 2022
- ISBN: 978-0593300237
- Preceded by: On Earth We're Briefly Gorgeous
- Followed by: The Emperor of Gladness

Time Is a Mother is a 2022 poetry collection by Vietnamese American writer Ocean Vuong. The book was shortlisted for the 2023 Griffin Poetry Prize.

== Content ==
The collections contends with Vuong's grief of having lost his mother, who died in November 2019, as well as suffering through the COVID-19 pandemic. Vuong said he experienced grief both as a son and also as a writer: "Like any child, I look at the blank page and I said, how do I play...the only place I could look to was the poems, because it was the only place I found linguistic pleasure."

Vuong considered the poem "Dear Rose", originally published in Harper's Magazine but later revised for his poetry collection, to be the "spine" of the collection.

Vuong said that this is his "proudest book" as he "didn’t compromise anything." He compared Time Is a Mother to his novel, On Earth We're Briefly Gorgeous:

"Time Is a Mother departs from any artist’s statement... I am going to talk about why the people I write about are important to me, to American history, and to the American imagination. In that way, it’s a subversive act. A Trojan horse, if you will. Time Is a Mother is the artist’s statement realized, made felt.

== Critical reception ==
Publishers Weekly gave the book a starred review. Chicago Review of Books said "We need no more proof of Vuong’s importance in the poetic canon."

Los Angeles Review of Books said the poems "examine the complexities of what it means to lose a mother, and what it means to embrace family and the self even when we want to look away." NPR, said the poetry collection was "aesthetically complex yet emotionally accessible," in the likeness of John Ashbery and Rainer Maria Rilke. The Guardian found it full of "new enlightening details that have a life of their own." World Literature Today said the collection contained "exquisite articulations of longing and grief."

The Times Literary Supplement lamented "There is a turn away from the other and towards the self in Vuong’s new book, which loosens its connection to the world...not only does Vuong’s imagery lose precision, but the poems lose their shape and definition."
