= Per Petterson =

Norwegian novelist

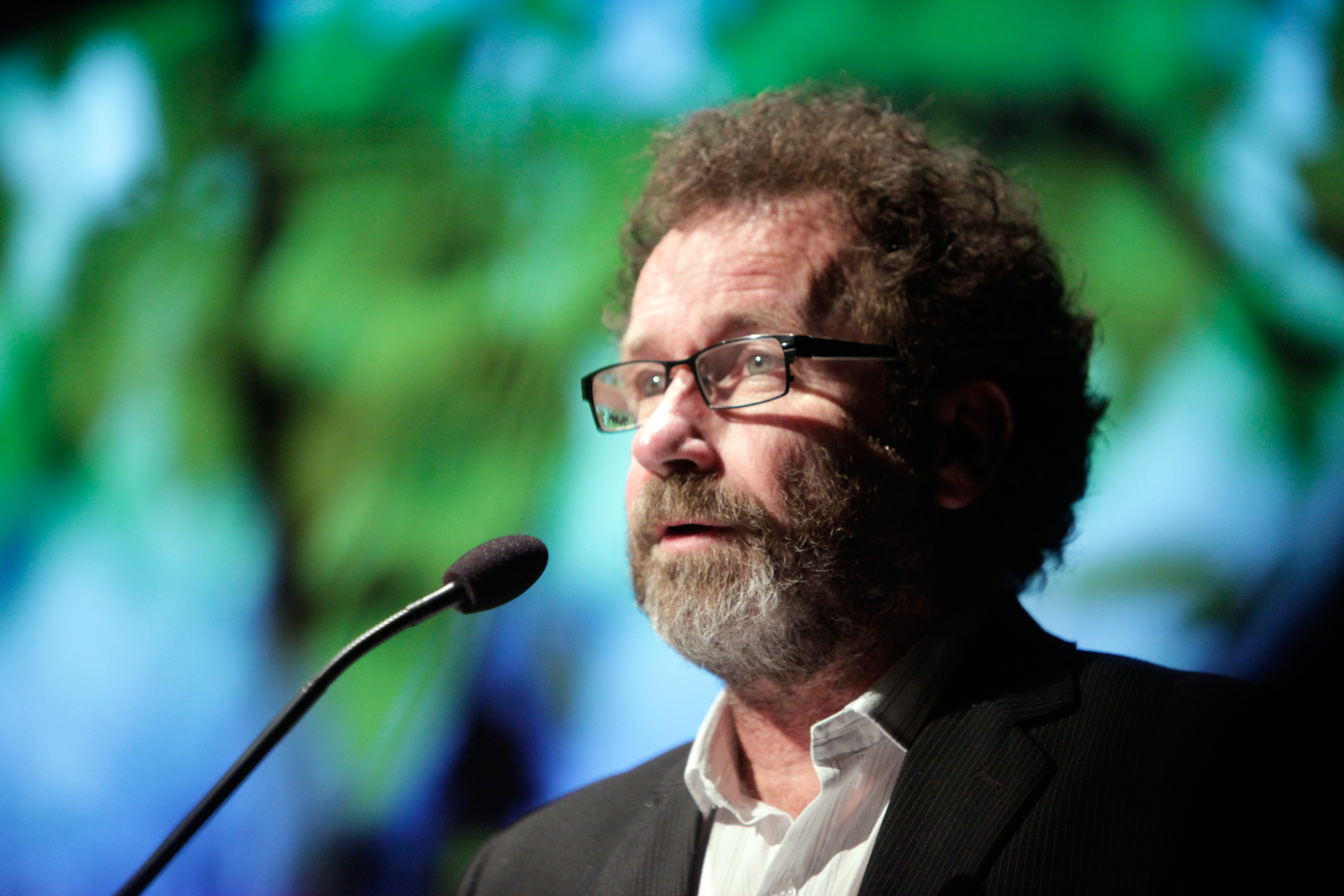
- Per Petterson, winner of the 2009 Nordic Council Literature Prize
- Born: 18 July 1952 (age 74); Oslo, Norway
- Occupations: Author, novelist
- Writing career
- Genre: Fiction

Per Petterson (born 18 July 1952 in Oslo) is a Norwegian novelist. His debut book was Aske i munnen, sand i skoa (1987), a collection of short stories. He has since published a number of novels with good reviews. To Siberia (1996), set in the Second World War, was published in English in 1998 and nominated for the Nordic Council Literature Prize. I kjølvannet, translated as In the Wake (2002), is a young man's story of losing his family in the Scandinavian Star ferry disaster in 1990 (Petterson himself lost his mother, father, younger brother and a niece in the disaster); it won the Brage Prize for 2000. His 2008 novel Jeg forbanner tidens elv (I Curse the River of Time) won the Nordic Council Literature Prize in 2009, with an English translation published in 2010.

His breakthrough novel was Ut og stjæle hester (2003), which was awarded two top literary prizes in Norway – the Norwegian Critics Prize for Literature and the Booksellers’ Best Book of the Year Award. The 2005 English language translation, Out Stealing Horses, was awarded the 2006 Independent Foreign Fiction Prize and the 2007 International Dublin Literary Award (the world's largest monetary literary prize for a single work of fiction published in English, €100,000). Out Stealing Horses was named one of the 10 best books of the year in the 9 December 2007 issue of the New York Times Book Review.

Petterson is a librarian. He worked as a bookstore clerk, translator and literary critic before becoming a full-time writer. He cites Knut Hamsun and Raymond Carver among his influences.

Petterson's works have been translated into almost 50 languages.

== Bibliography ==
- Aske i munnen, sand i skoa (1987). Ashes in My Mouth, Sand in My Shoes, trans. Don Bartlett (Harvill Secker, 2013; Graywolf, 2015)
- Ekkoland (1989). Echoland, trans. Don Bartlett (Harvill Secker, 2016; Graywolf, 2022)
- Det er greit for meg (1992). It's Fine by Me, trans. Don Bartlett (Harvill Secker, 2011; Graywolf, 2012)
- Til Sibir (1996). To Siberia, trans. Anne Born (Harvill Secker, 1998; Graywolf, 2008)
- I kjølvannet (2000). In the Wake, trans. Anne Born (St. Martin's Press, 2002; Harvill Secker, 2003)
- Ut og stjæle hester (2003). Out Stealing Horses, trans. Anne Born (Harvill Secker, 2005; Graywolf, 2007)
- Månen over Porten (2004)
- Jeg forbanner tidens elv (2008). I Curse the River of Time, trans. Charlotte Barslund (Harvill Secker/Graywolf, 2010)
- Jeg nekter (2012). I Refuse, trans. Don Bartlett (Harvill Secker, 2014; Graywolf, 2015)
- Menn i min situasjon (2018). Men in My Situation, trans. Ingvild Burkey (Harvill Secker, 2021; Graywolf, 2022)
- Mitt Abruzzo. Journal 21.1 – 18.7.2021 (2021)

== Awards and Prizes ==
- Nordic Council Literature Prize, 2009
- Brage Prize, 2008
- Norwegian Critics Prize for Literature, 2008
- International Dublin Literary Award, 2007
- One of the 5 Best Fiction Books of 2007, New York Times
- One of the 10 Best Fiction Books of 2007, Time Magazine
- A New York Library Book to Remember, 2007
- Le Prix Mille Pages, 2007
- Le Prix Litteraire Europeen Madeleine Zepter, 2007
- Independent Foreign Fiction Prize, 2006
- Norwegian Critics Prize for Literature, 2003
- Norwegian Booksellers' Prize, 2003
- Brage Prize, 2000
