= David Colmer =

Australian writer and translator

David Colmer (Adelaide, 1960) is an Australian writer and translator, mainly of Dutch-language literature. He translates novels, poetry and children's literature and is the current English translator of Gerbrand Bakker, Dimitri Verhulst, Annie M.G. Schmidt, and Nachoem M. Wijnberg. Colmer's poetry translations include selections of the work of Hugo Claus, Anna Enquist, Cees Nooteboom, Ramsey Nasr and Paul van Ostaijen.

== Awards and nominations ==
- 2024 David Van Reybrouck's Revolusi, a co-translation with David McKay, shortlisted for both the Cundill History Prize and the 2024 Baillie Gifford Prize.
- 2021: James Brockway Prize for his translations of Dutch-language poetry
- 2014: Shortlisted for the PEN Award for Poetry in Translation for Even Now, selected poems of Hugo Claus
- 2014: Shortlisted for the International Dublin Literary Award, with Gerbrand Bakker, for The Detour
- 2013: Vondel Prize for Dimitri Verhulst’s The Misfortunates
- 2013: Independent Foreign Fiction Prize, with Gerbrand Bakker, for The Detour
- 2012: The Dutch Foundation for Literature's Translation Prize for translations from Dutch
- 2011: Shortlisted for the Popescu Prize for Heavenly Life, selected poems of Ramsey Nasr
- 2010: International Dublin Literary Award, with Gerbrand Bakker, for The Twin
- 2010: Shortlisted, with Gerbrand Bakker, for the Best Translated Book Award for The Twin
- 2009: NSW Premier's Translation Prize and the PEN Trophy (biennial prize for a body of work)
- 2009: Shortlisted for the Oxford-Weidenfeld Translation Prize for The Twin
- 2007–2011: David Reid Poetry Translation Prize (four times)

== Selection of translated titles ==
- Gerbrand Bakker: The Detour (2012); The Twin (2008)
- Hugo Claus: Even Now (2013, selected poems)
- Adriaan van Dis: Repatriated (2008, novel)
- Anna Enquist: The Fire was Here (2003, selected poems)
- Gummbah: Meanwhile, Between Two Eternities of Darkness (2013, a selection of the cartoons, revised and updated edition)
- Willem Frederik Hermans: An Untouched House (2018, Het behouden huis)
- Willem Frederik Hermans: A Guardian Angel Recalls (2021, Herinneringen van een engelbewaarder)
- Cees Nooteboom: Self-portrait of an Other (2011, prose poems)
- Ramsey Nasr: Heavenly Life (2010, selected poems)
- Martinus Nijhoff: Awater (2010)
- Willem Jan Otten: The Portrait (2009, novel)
- Annie M.G. Schmidt: The Complete Jip and Janneke (2023); A Pond Full of Ink (2011, a selection of her children's poems); Tow-Truck Pluck (2011, Pluk van de Petteflet)
- Paul van Ostaijen: Occupied City (2016, Bezette stad)
- Dimitri Verhulst: Problemski Hotel (2005, novel), (2009, novel); The Misfortunates (2012, novel)
- Menno Wigman: Window-cleaner Sees Paintings (2016, selected poems)
- Nachoem M. Wijnberg: Advance Payment (2013, selected poems)
