= Man Gone Down =

2006 novel by Michael Thomas

- First edition
- Author: Michael Thomas
- Original title: Man Gone Down
- Language: English
- Publisher: Grove Press
- Publication date: Dec 2006
- Publication place: United States
- Pages: 431
- ISBN: 0-8021-7029-3
- OCLC: 74492272
- Dewey Decimal: 813/.6 22
- LC Class: PS3620.H6352 M36 2007

Man Gone Down (2006) is the debut novel of U.S. author Michael Thomas. It won the 2009 International Dublin Literary Award, with Thomas receiving a prize of €100,000 (£85,000, US$140,000). Man Gone Down is also recommended by The New York Times.

== Plot introduction ==
The novel is about an African-American man estranged from his white wife and their children, and who must come up with a sum of money within four days to have them returned. The plot focuses on an attempt to achieve the American Dream. Thomas describes Man Gone Down as having a "gallows humour".
