= Night Sky with Exit Wounds =

2016 poetry collection by Ocean Vuong

- First edition cover
- Author: Ocean Vuong
- Language: English
- Genre: Poetry
- Publisher: Copper Canyon Press
- Publication date: April 5, 2016
- Publication place: United States
- Media type: Print (Paperback)
- Pages: 89
- Awards: 2017 T. S. Eliot Prize
- ISBN: 978-1-55659-495-3
- Dewey Decimal: 811/.6
- LC Class: PS3622.U96 A6 2016

Night Sky with Exit Wounds is a 2016 collection of poetry by Vietnamese American poet and essayist Ocean Vuong. The book won the T. S. Eliot Prize in 2017—which made him the youngest winner of the award at the time at 29 years old, as well as the second-ever debut poet to receive it. The book also won the Whiting Award in 2016.

== Content ==
Vuong and his family immigrated to the United States from Vietnam when he was two years old. Many of the poems in the collection take the Vietnam War as their subject, including "Aubade With Burning City" which deals with the Fall of Saigon. "Untitled (Blue, Green, and Brown)", named for a Mark Rothko painting, is about the 9/11 attacks and Vuong's experience that day.

== Critical reception ==
Bill Herbert, reflecting on the poetry collection's selection for the T. S. Eliot Prize, said: "There is a mystery at the heart of the book about generational karma, this migrant figure coming to terms with his relationship with his past, his relationship with his father and his relationship with his sexuality. All of that is borne out in some quite extraordinary imagery. The view of the world from this book is quite stunning."

Michiko Kakutani, writing for The New York Times, said that the collection "beautifully attests to Mr. Vuong’s own ability to use the magic of words to summon and preserve the past".

Claire Schwartz, in The Georgia Review, said: "one reason Vuong’s debut collection Night Sky with Exit Wounds feels so exquisite, so necessary, is that he offers another way to hold the present moment. Vuong refuses to cede long and complex cultural histories to the flashiness of the only-now. Neither will he relinquish the writing of history to those invested in domination and empire."

Eric Nguyen, in Diasporic Vietnamese Artists Network's diaCRITICS, wrote: "For all we have ruined—with wars, domestic abuse, homophobia, racism, etc—Vuong is still hopeful; this is precisely why he’s the poet we need now more than ever. He lays bare our brutal histories and tells us, yes, we can do better."

Christopher Soto, writing for Lambda Literary, said "Ocean Vuong is a formally inventive, thematically brave, emotionally intelligent poet, so worthy of the reader’s trust. There are few poets alive who can morph image and language and tone in the manner that Ocean Vuong did with this debut collection."

Peter LaBerge, in the Harvard Review, said "Vuong accomplishes with sophistication and grace what many poets only strive to accomplish: he invites us to experience a world where hardship and isolation are expectations ... This voice, Vuong’s necessary, shimmering voice, fills us to the core."

Dan Lopez, writing for The Los Angeles Review of Books, said that "But for all his laments, Vuong holds out hope for a life that isn’t defined by fear."

== Awards ==
Year	Award	Category	Result	Ref.
2016	Goodreads Choice Awards	Poetry	Nominated—12th	
2016	Whiting Award	Poetry	Won	
2017	Forward Prizes for Poetry	First Collection	Won	
2017	The Kingsley and Kate Tufts Poetry Awards	Kate Tufts Discovery Award	Finalist	
2017	Lambda Literary Award	Gay Poetry	Shortlisted	
2017	Publishing Triangle Awards	Thom Gunn Award	Won	
2017	T. S. Eliot Prize	—	Won	
