= Vyvyane Loh =

American novelist

Vyvyane Loh (Chinese: Loh Hui-Shien) is a Malaysian-American novelist, choreographer, and physician.

== Biography ==
Loh was born in Ipoh, Malaysia of an ethnic Chinese family. She grew up in Singapore and completed a degree in Biology and Classics at Boston University in the United States. She then went on to study at the Boston University School of Medicine and undertook a residency in internal medicine. After a short stint in private practice, she quit her full-time medical job when she was awarded a full scholarship to the Master of Fine Arts program at Warren Wilson College in Creative Writing (Fiction). While pursuing her degree, she worked part-time as a physician; a fitness and dance instructor; and personal trainer to support herself. She graduated in July 2001 and her novel Breaking the Tongue, written during her MFA program, was published in 2004. It was shortlisted for the International IMPAC Award, the only first novel on the 2005 shortlist.

Loh was a Radcliffe (Bunting) Fellow in Fiction in 2005/2006 and a Guggenheim Fellow in Fiction in 2008. She is currently the medical director of Transform Institute for Metabolic & Lifestyle Medicine in Newton, MA. She is board-certified in internal medicine and obesity medicine. Loh serves on the exam writing committee for the American Board of Obesity Medicine, as well as its strategic planning committee.

== Works ==
- Breaking the Tongue (2004, W.W. Norton & Co.) ISBN 0393057925
