= Ocean Vuong =

American writer (born 1988)

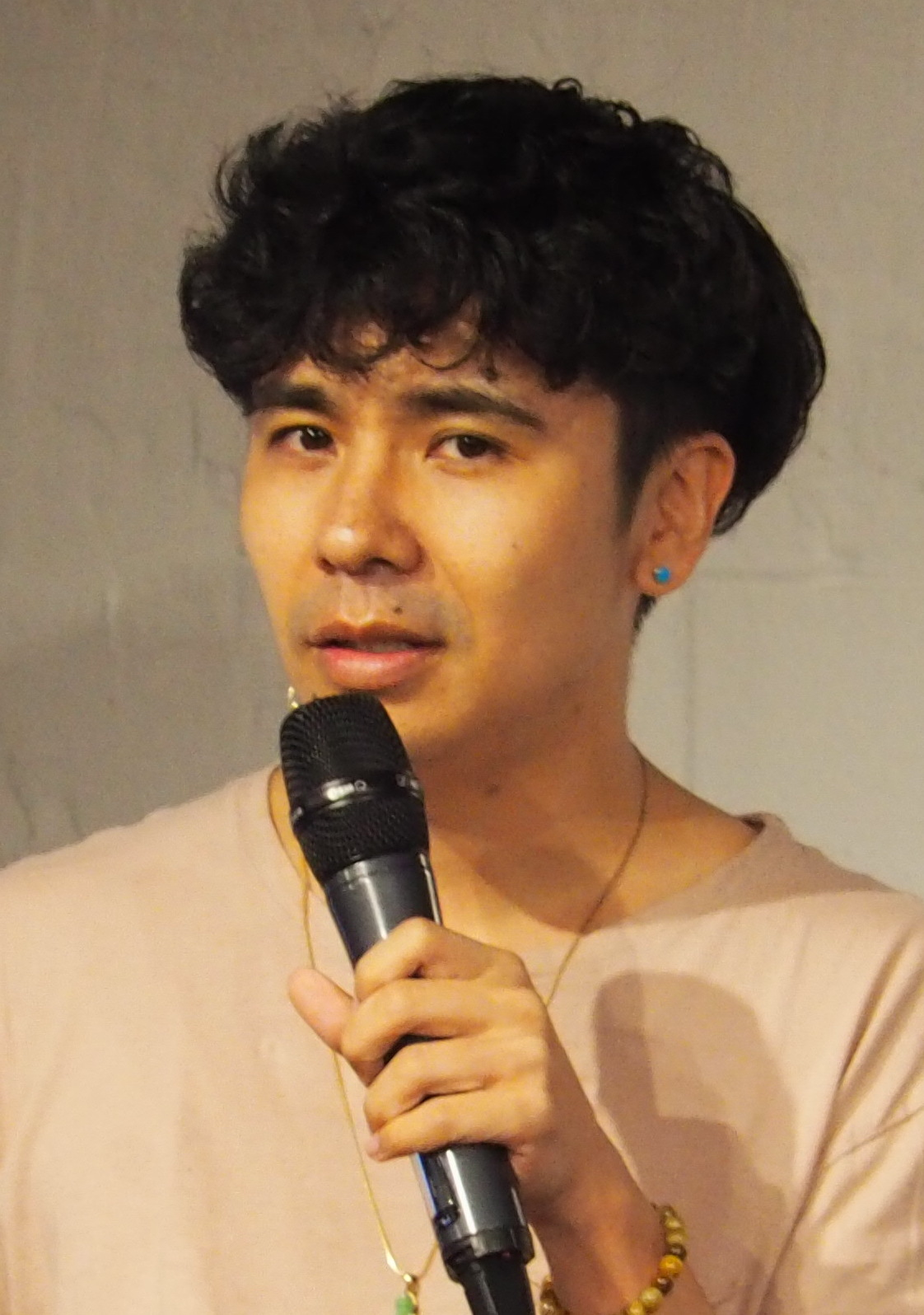
- Vuong in 2019
- Born: Vương Quốc Vinh; October 14, 1988 (age 38); Ho Chi Minh City, Vietnam
- Education: Brooklyn College (BFA); New York University (MFA)
- Occupations: Poet, writer, professor
- Writing career
- Genres: Poetry, essays, novel
- Notable works: Night Sky with Exit Wounds (2016); On Earth We're Briefly Gorgeous (2019)
- Notable awards: Pushcart Prize (2013); Ruth Lilly/Sargent Rosenberg Fellowship (2014); Forward Prizes for Poetry (2017); T. S. Eliot Prize (2018); MacArthur Fellowship (2019)
- Website: Ocean Vuong

Ocean Vuong (born Vương Quốc Vinh, Vietnamese: [vɨəŋ˧ kuək˧˥ viɲ˧]; born October 14, 1988) is an American poet, essayist, novelist and photographer. His debut novel, On Earth We're Briefly Gorgeous, was published in 2019. He received a MacArthur Fellowship the same year. He is the recipient of the 2014 Ruth Lilly and Dorothy Sargent Rosenberg Poetry Fellowship from the Poetry Foundation, 2016 Whiting Award, and the 2017 T. S. Eliot Prize.

== Early life and background ==
Vương Quốc Vinh was born in Ho Chi Minh City, Vietnam, to a multiracial mother and Vietnamese father of Chinese descent. His Vietnamese given name is taken from Hong Kong entertainer Leslie Cheung, whom Vuong's father was a fan of.

Vuong's maternal grandmother grew up in rural Vietnam, and his maternal grandfather, a man from Michigan, was serving in the United States Navy during the Vietnam War when he met and fell in love with Vuong's grandmother. They married and had three daughters, one of whom was Vuong's mother. His grandfather had gone back to visit family in the U.S., and was unable to return when Saigon fell to communist forces; his grandmother then placed his mother and her sisters in separate orphanages. As daughters of a US serviceman, they would have qualified for Operation Babylift, a program that evacuated children to the United States for adoption.

Vuong's mother gave birth to him at 18, already working in a hair salon in Saigon. However, her mixed-race heritage caught the attention of a policeman, who recognized that, under Vietnamese law, she was working illegally due to her background. This discovery forced the family to flee Vietnam for safety. They were evacuated to a refugee camp in the Philippines, and two-year-old Vuong and his family eventually gained asylum and migrated to the United States. They settled in Hartford, Connecticut, and Vuong grew up in the suburbs of Glastonbury, Connecticut, where he attended Glastonbury High School. He went by Vin or Vinny and was known for riding his bike everywhere. He was an avid basketball fan and often played pick-up basketball.

Vuong was the first in his family to achieve proficiency in reading and writing, learning to read at the age of eleven. He suspected dyslexia ran in his family. At 15 years old, Vuong worked on a tobacco farm illegally and would later describe his experiences on the farm in On Earth We're Briefly Gorgeous. Along the Connecticut River in South Glastonbury are the tobacco farms, which many teenagers worked as summer jobs for cash under the table in the summers. He was reunited with his maternal grandfather later in life.

== Education ==
Vuong attended Glastonbury High School in Glastonbury, Connecticut, a school known for academic excellence. "I didn't know how to make use of it," Vuong has stated, noting that his grade point average at one point was 1.7.

While in high school, Vuong told fellow Glastonbury graduate Kat Chow, he "understood he had to leave Connecticut." After spending some time studying at Manchester Community College, he transferred to Pace University in New York City to study international marketing. His time there lasted only a few weeks before he realized it "wasn't for him."

Vuong then enrolled at Brooklyn College of the City University of New York, where he studied 19th-century English literature under poet and novelist Ben Lerner, and earned a BFA in Creative Writing . While at Brooklyn College, Vuong received an Academy of American Poets College Prize. Vuong went on to earn an MFA in poetry from New York University.

In 2022, Vuong received an honorary doctorate from Mount Holyoke College. He gave the commencement speech for the college's 185th commencement on May 22.

== Career ==
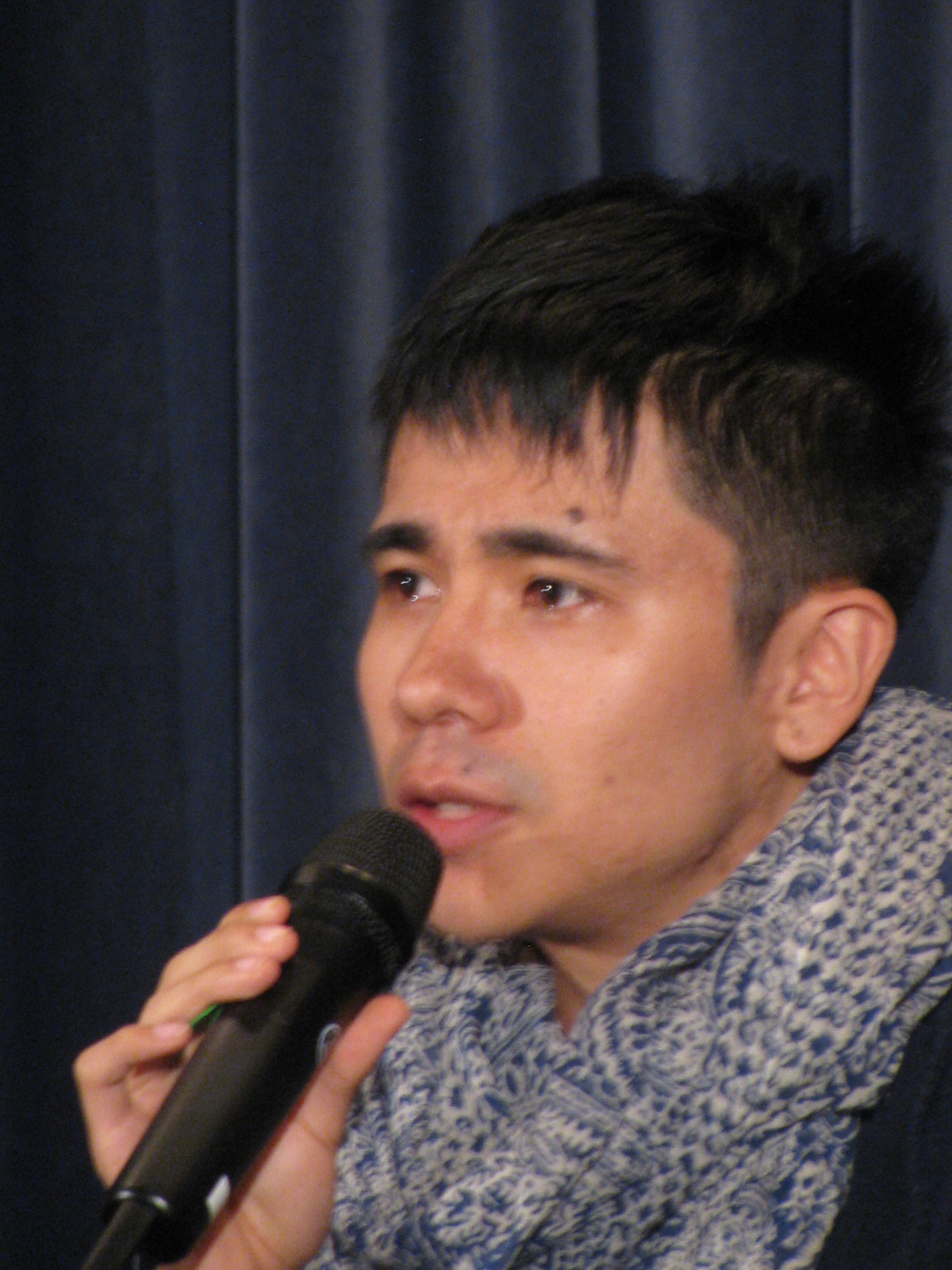
Reading at the Library of Congress, 2015

Vuong's poems and essays have been published in various journals, including Poetry, The Nation, TriQuarterly, Guernica, The Rumpus, Boston Review, Narrative Magazine, The New Republic, The New Yorker, and The New York Times.

His first chapbook, Burnings (Sibling Rivalry Press), was a 2011 "Over The Rainbow" selection for notable books with LGBT content by the American Library Association. His second chapbook, No (YesYes Books), was released in 2013. His debut full-length collection, Night Sky with Exit Wounds, was released by Copper Canyon Press in 2016. His first novel, On Earth We're Briefly Gorgeous, was published by Penguin Press on June 4, 2019. This novel achieved great success, being longlisted for several major honors, including the 2019 National Book Award for Fiction, the Carnegie Medal in Fiction, the Aspen Words Literary Prize, and the PEN/Hemingway Award for Debut Novel. It was also shortlisted for the 2019 Center for Fiction First Novel Prize and ultimately won the 2019 New England Book Award for Fiction. While working on the novel, the biggest issue Vuong had was with grammatical tense, since there are no past participles in Vietnamese. Vuong also regarded the book as a "phantom novel" dedicated to the "phantom readership of the mother, of [his] family," who are illiterate and thus cannot read his book. The novel is written in epistolary form from a son in his adulthood to his illiterate mother. It dives into their complicated relationship, confronting issues of race, class, trauma, and masculinity. The novel explores how storytelling can heal as well as give voice to what has been silenced. Vuong's mother was diagnosed with breast cancer three months before the publication of On Earth We're Briefly Gorgeous. After his mother died in 2019, Vuong began writing his second collection of poetry, Time Is a Mother, which has been described as a "search for life after the death of his mother."

On Earth We're Briefly Gorgeous has generated controversy over objects that some of its content is pornographic. After protest from an online group, the International School Ho Chi Minh City had taken back 19 copies of the book from students, to whom the book had been handed out.

In August 2020, Vuong was revealed as the seventh writer to contribute to Future Library. Discussing his contribution to the project, Vuong opined that, "So much of publishing is about seeing your name in the world, but this is the opposite, putting the future ghost of you forward. You and I will have to die in order for us to get these texts. That is a heady thing to write towards, so I will sit with it a while."

Vuong has stated his view of fiction as a moral vehicle. Discussing On Earth We're Briefly Gorgeous, he said: "Fiction is strongest when it launches a moral question. When it goes out and seeks to answer. The questions that we couldn't ask in life because the costs would be too much. Fiction and narrative art give us a vicarious opportunity to see these questions play out, at no true cost to our own."

He served as the 2019–2020 Artist-In-Resident at NYU's Asian/Pacific/American Institute, also working with the school's Center for Refugee Poetics and the Lillian Vernon Creative Writers House. In 2022, he became a tenured Professor of Creative Writing at NYU, and has also taught in the MFA Program for Poets and Writers at the University of Massachusetts, Amherst. In 2022, Vuong was named as one of "32 Essential Asian American Writers" by BuzzFeed Books.

Vuong released a second novel titled The Emperor of Gladness on May 13, 2025. The novel was an Oprah's Book Club 2.0 selection on publication, and received largely favorable reviews, with Maureen Corrigan calling it "a truly great novel about work." However, Tom Crewe in the London Review of Books lambasted it as "one of the worst ordeals of my reading life," criticizing it and Vuong's first novel for their "ridiculous, sententious" writing, "slight" plots, and "cartoon characters."

== Personal life ==
Vuong has described himself as being raised by women. During a conversation with a customer, his mother, a manicurist, expressed a desire to go to the beach, and pronounced the word "beach" as "bitch". The customer suggested she use the word "ocean" instead of "beach". After learning the definition of the word "ocean" — the most massive classified body of water, such as the Pacific Ocean, which connects the United States and Vietnam – she renamed her son Ocean.

Three months before On Earth We're Briefly Gorgeous was published, Vuong's mother was diagnosed with breast cancer, and she died in November 2019. Vuong wrote Time Is a Mother while in mourning. According to Vuong, the collection of poems is the search for life after this heartbreaking event.

In November 2021, an excerpt from On Earth We're Briefly Gorgeous was featured in that year's New South Wales Higher School Certificate exams. The paper, the first of two English exams taken by year twelve students in the Australian state, required examinees to read an excerpt from the novel and answer a short question responding to it. On the exam's conclusion, Australian school students bombarded Vuong with confused inquiries via Instagram, to which the author responded in humorous fashion. In one comment, in response to the mother of a student requesting more information about the excerpt, Vuong replied by asking, "Don’t y’all have Spark Notes in Australia?" Later, relating his own story, Vuong said: “For what it’s worth, I didn’t get into ‘uni’ either out of high school. I went to a local community college where I did some of my best learning.”

Vuong is gay and is a practicing Zen Buddhist. He lives in Northampton, Massachusetts, with his partner, Peter Bienkowski, and his half-brother whom he took in after their mother died.

== Social activism ==
In light of the outbreak of the Gaza war and genocide, Vuong has been a supporter of the boycott of Israeli cultural institutions, including publishers and literary festivals. Vuong was also a signatory to an open letter by the group Writers Against the War in Gaza dated October 27, 2023.

Speaking about the relationship between literature and politics, Vuong said that literature is inherently and "always" political, expressing how language can be used to manipulate public memory, especially when it comes to political messaging. He used the “Make America Great Again” slogan as an example of “linguistic hallucinations”, which create unrealistic or dangerous remembrances of the past.

Vuong also uses his platform to advocate for a greater representation of queer, refugee, and immigrant communities. He tries to challenge the limited ways these identities are portrayed or viewed in American culture. Through his writing and teaching, Vuong tries to encourage people to question the dominant narratives that shape cultural discourse. He encourages his students to question the conventional ideas about language and narrative, and he describes this approach as a way to challenge limiting assumptions and broaden creative expression.

== Work ==
Ocean Vuong’s writing bridges personal and historical trauma through poetic and textual experimentation. He often draws from his own lived experiences, such as being a queer refugee learning to navigate language, family, and loss, and uses these as inspiration for his works. Vuong first established himself in poetry with his poetry chapbook Burnings (2010) before he reached international recognition with Night Sky with Exit Wounds (2016), which was the first full length poetry collection that he published. He then turned to fiction with the release of his debut novel On Earth We’re Briefly Gorgeous (2019). This switch from poetry to fiction expanded his audience and established him as a literary voice in contemporary American writing.

Following the huge success of his debut novel, Vuong released a second poetry collection, Time Is a Mother (2022), which was written during his grief process of his mother’s death. Most recently, in 2025, he released his second novel, The Emperor of Gladness, which explores themes of aging and mental health. Across his poetry, essays, and fiction, Vuong consistently returns to a set of core themes that evolve across different works.

=== Themes ===
Vuong’s writing, in both his poetry and fiction, tends to focus on similar ideas or themes. He often focuses on connections between displacement, desire, and trauma passed down through generations, specifically through a lens of family. His characters are often marginalized people in our society, some examples including queer refugees or working-class immigrants.

Below are some of the major themes that can be seen throughout his work:

==== Identity: queer and refugee ====
As stated, Vuong uses a lot of his personal experiences as inspiration for his works. Being a queer refugee, this journey of understanding and accepting this identity is a theme Vuong talks about in a lot of his work. Some scholars argue that in his writing, Vuong “foregrounds character over identity”. Vuong shifts attention away from fixed ideas of identity and toward to show the character's lived experience. In doing this, he reframes queer and refugee identities as a subject of joy and agency, rather than a symbol of struggle. Specifically in On Earth We’re Briefly Gorgeous, the narrator’s experiences reflect overlapping forms of marginalization. Rather than following the standard format of a character learning to assimilate themselves in society faced with oppression, themes of belonging and exclusion among queer refugees appear in Vuong’s work, often in relation to American cultural ideals. These American ideals frequently diverge from Vuong’s own experiences and those represented in his characters, particularly in relation to sexuality, migration, and Vietnamese American identity. By having these different identities, he argues that he struggles to understand his place in the world.

==== Trauma and memory ====
Trauma is a prominent theme in Vuong’s work. He draws from his personal experiences with the Vietnam War and how it continues to affect later generations. Instead of treating trauma as something that happened in the past, he displays how it lives on through memory and familiar relationships. In his novel On Earth We’re Briefly Gorgeous, the narrator’s memories are not necessarily his, but rather shaped by his mother and grandmother. They shared their experiences with him, and even though these memories are painful, they need to be held on to. Vuong writes trauma as something that has to be translated across language and culture.

For Vuong, trauma is not only about revealing the past and accepting it; it is also about not letting those stories disappear. His writing challenges the idea that traumatic events are separate from the modern day, reminding readers that trauma continues long after the actual event occurs.

==== Language and literacy ====
Vuong did not learn to read until later childhood, a background that has influenced his relationship with the English language. He views language as a site of reinvention, not a default literary norm. Vuong also reflects on how language can both enable and limit connections with people. This comes partly from his upbringing. Even though his mother could not understand English well, she recognized the power and opportunity attached to it as an immigrant in the United States. Because of this, she encouraged Vuong to fully immerse himself in reading and writing. Her belief in the importance of English reflects a common desire among immigrant parents who hope that education and literacy will help their children succeed in America.

Critics have noted that Vuong’s writing frequently employs non-linear structures and stylistic experimentation that depart from conventional English narrative forms. These experimentations reflect the experiences of refugees and immigrants who are learning English for the first time. Through this approach, Vuong challenges dominant assumptions about standardized English and expands the range of voices and experiences represented in contemporary literature.

==== Grief and loss ====
Vuong writes about grief and loss due to personal experiences. In interviews, he has discussed how his mother’s illness and death influenced his writing. He says that through losing the person that he used to write for, he redefined his purpose for writing. He talks about this specifically with Time Is a Mother, and this poetry collection becomes not a memorial but his feelings of grief made legible through poetry. Critics have noted that Vuong’s experiences of grief inform both the emotional focus of his poetry and the interior lives of characters in his fiction.

==== Beauty ====
Vuong uses beauty as a tool to transform the way trauma is perceived. Scholars have identified this as “refugee beauty”, which is a refusal to let traumatic narratives, such as war or displacement, be owned by those who cause such violence. Vuong uses the theme of beauty as a way to engaged with marginalized communities, and their stories and experiences.

==== Violence ====
Violence is another theme in his works as well. He talks about systematic racism, homophobia, and war, but he expresses these acts of brutality through humor or writes about it with tenderness. By doing this, Vuong takes issues such as sexual shame or racial trauma and turns them into opportunities to heal.

=== Writing style ===
Critics have noted Vuong's blending of poetic and prose techniques. Hua Hsu, writing in The New Yorker, observed that Vuong's approach to English reflects his experience learning the language as an immigrant.

In his prose, Vuong structures his fiction through techniques of fragmentation and nonlinear storytelling. With the instability of memory being a theme he often comes back to in his work, these techniques reflect this instability, especially in communities shaped by war and generational trauma. Ha and Tompkins argue that in his debut novel On Earth We’re Briefly Gorgeous, Vuong relies on temporality in order to showcase this trauma and the effect it has on a person. They also state that he uses letters and shifting recollections of the past, and with this utilization of fragmentation in his writing, he is able to show how trauma interrupts a narrative continuing. Other scholars state that Vuong uses this distorted writing style to show disjointed memories and disrupted recollections of their past to express how refugees navigate survival and belonging.

Voice and marginality are a big aspect of Vuong’s writing, and many scholars state that he uses specific literary styles to showcase this. One group of scholars noted that by Vuong utilizing letters to share experiences in his works, he creates writing that is intimate and honest. He uses this epistolary style in On Earth We’re Briefly Gorgeous, and this allows for the narrator, Little Dog, to express his overlapping forms of identity and marginalization (which include queerness, immigrant identity, and family trauma). This use of letters in his writing allows for Vuong to reflect the vulnerability and courage that it takes to speak against different boundaries, both linguistic and cultural.

Even in his prose and fiction, Vuong’s role as a poet is still seen as he uses poetic techniques in all forms of his writing. Kurmann described his approach as one of “intersectional poetics”. He defined intersectional poetics as a type of writing style that brings together different parts of identity at once. In Vuong’s writing, he brings together race, sexuality, and refugee status together, rather than separating them. Scholars state that Vuong’s mix of poetic language and auto fiction creates a style where different identities overlap, which shape how his characters speak and move through the world. Critics have described Vuong’s writing style as employing intersectional poetics, particularly in the development of voice across his poetry and prose.

Language is a repeated theme throughout Vuong’s poetry and fiction, but he also uses language itself in his stylistic experimentation. Hsu notes that Vuong approaches English as something that is flexible and revisable, not concrete or upheld by rules. This flexibility of language is partly due to the fact that he did not learn to read until later childhood. This has been cited as an influence on his writing. He treats language as something that can be reinvented; it is not based on a fixed, literary norm. Throughout his writing, he challenges conventional grammar and structure. Hsu explains again that Vuong’s drafting process involves constant revision and an openness to reshaping language.

Vuong’s writing through a fragmented style reflects how trauma can disrupt linear narrative and clear communication. Instead of presenting events in a chronological order, he writes in a way that movies across time and memory that mimic how survivors of trauma and violence experience the world. Rather than focusing only on pain, Vuong tries to highlight the possibility of healing through storytelling. The trauma written about in Vuong’s work is not meant to be solely destructive, but is meant to create a closeness among those who share similar experiences.

== Bibliography ==
=== Books ===
Type	Title	Year	Publisher	Identifier	Ref.
Novels	On Earth We're Briefly Gorgeous	2019	Penguin Press	Paperback: ISBN 978-0-525-56204-7; Hardcover: ISBN 978-0-525-56202-3	
Novels	The Emperor of Gladness	2025	Penguin Press	Hardcover: ISBN 978-0-593-83187-8	
Poetry	Night Sky with Exit Wounds	2016	Copper Canyon Press	Paperback: ISBN 978-1-55659-495-3; Hardcover: ISBN 978-1-55659-585-1	
Poetry	Time Is a Mother	2022	Penguin Press	Paperback: ISBN 978-0-593-30025-1; Hardcover: ISBN 978-0-593-30023-7	
Chapbooks	Burnings	2010	Sibling Rivalry Press	Paperback: ISBN 978-0-578-07059-9	
Chapbooks	No	2013	YesYes Books	Paperback: ISBN 978-1-936919-22-2	

=== Verse ===
Title	Year	Publisher	Ref.
12 Gauge	2013	The Paris-American	
DetoNation	2014	Poetry	
Aubade with Burning City	2014	Poetry	
Kissing in Vietnamese	2014	Split This Rock (Note: Reprinted from Split This Rock's The Quarry: A Social Justice Poetry Database.)	
On Earth We're Briefly Gorgeous	2014	Poetry	
Trojan	2015	Narrative Magazine	
Waterline	2015	Narrative Magazine	
No One Knows the Way to Heaven	2015	Narrative Magazine	
Someday I'll love Ocean Vuong	2015	The New Yorker	
Two Boys Bathing During a Ceasefire	2015	The New Republic	
Tell Me Something Good	2015	Academy of American Poets	
Trevor	2016	BuzzFeed News	
Toy Boat	2016	Poetry	
A Little Closer to the Edge	2016	Poetry	
Scavengers	2016	The New Yorker	
Ode to Masturbation	2016	Split This Rock	
Essay on Craft	2017	Poetry	
You Guys	2017	Granta	
Dear Rose	2017	Harper's Magazine	
Almost Human	2019	The New Yorker	
Not Even This	2020	Poetry	
Reasons for Staying	2021	Harper's Magazine	
Beautiful Short Loser	2022	Granta	

=== Prose and essays ===
Title	Year	Publisher	Ref.
The Weight of Our Living: On Hope, Fire Escapes, and Visible Desperation	2014	The Rumpus	
Beginnings: New York	2015	The Adroit Journal	
Surrendering	2016	The New Yorker	
A Letter to My Mother That She Will Never Read	2017	The New Yorker	
How I Did It: The Seventh Circle of Earth	2017	Poetry School	
How Can We Make the MFA Workshop More Hospitable to Writers of Color?	2018	Literary Hub	
Reimagining Masculinity	2019	The Paris Review	
The 10 Books I Needed to Write My Novel	2019	Literary Hub	

=== Television ===
Year	Programme	Channel	Role	Notes	Ref.
2016	PBS NewsHour	PBS	Himself	Vietnamese American Poet Contemplates His Personal Ties to the War	
2019	Late Night with Seth Meyers	NBC	Himself	Season 6, Episode 111	
2019	Vice News Tonight	HBO	Himself	Ocean Vuong 'Breaks Apart' The Immigrant Experience in His Debut Novel	
2019	Amanpour & Company	PBS	Himself	Ocean Vuong on Race, Sexuality and His New Novel	

== Awards and honours ==
As of 2024, Vuong has won, received a nomination, or was considered for literature awards as well as career awards for fellowship and grant, residences, and listicles. His book The Emperor of Gladness was added to the Oprah's Book Club in May 2025.

== See also ==
- LGBT culture in New York City
- List of LGBT people from New York City
- List of Vietnamese Americans
