= On Earth We're Briefly Gorgeous =

2019 novel by Ocean Vuong

- First edition cover
- Author: Ocean Vuong
- Audio read by: Ocean Vuong
- Language: English
- Publisher: Penguin Press
- Publication date: June 4, 2019
- Publication place: New York
- Media type: Print (Hardcover)
- Pages: 256
- ISBN: 978-0-525-56202-3
- Dewey Decimal: 813/.6
- LC Class: PS3622.U96 O52 2019

On Earth We're Briefly Gorgeous is the debut novel by Vietnamese American poet Ocean Vuong, published by Penguin Press on June 4, 2019. An epistolary novel, it is written in the form of a letter from a Vietnamese American son to his illiterate mother. It was a finalist for the 2020 PEN/Faulkner Award for Fiction and was longlisted for the 2019 National Book Award for Fiction.

== Plot ==
The novel is written in the form of a letter by a young Vietnamese American nicknamed Little Dog, whose life mirrors that of Ocean Vuong. The letter is written to Little Dog's mother Hong, more often called or translated as Rose (hồng). The novel has a nonlinear narrative structure.

The novel also recounts the life of Little Dog's grandmother, Lan, who escapes an arranged marriage during the Vietnam War and becomes a prostitute. She is four months pregnant when she meets a white American soldier. They marry and she gives birth to a child, Rose. Later, when Rose is Little Dog's mother, she is barely literate, having left school at the age of five when her schoolhouse in Vietnam collapsed during an American napalm raid. She suffers from posttraumatic stress disorder as a result. Rose marries an abusive man but eventually separates from him.

Working in a nail salon, she struggles as a single parent living in Hartford, Connecticut, with her son and her mother Lan. Living in America as refugees, the three can barely speak English. Little Dog, who is gay, is abused by his mother throughout his childhood. Halfway through the novel, Little Dog meets a young white man named Trevor while working on a tobacco farm one summer, and the two begin a romantic relationship. Trevor eventually becomes addicted to opioids and later overdoses and dies.

== Reception ==
=== Critical response ===
The novel debuted at number six on The New York Times Hardcover Fiction best-sellers list for the week ending June 8, 2019. It spent six weeks on the list.

Kirkus Reviews wrote, "The result is an uncategorizable hybrid of what reads like memoir, bildungsroman, and book-length poem. More important than labels, though, is the novel's earnest and open-hearted belief in the necessity of stories and language for our survival. A raw and incandescently written foray into fiction by one of our most gifted poets." Ron Charles of The Washington Post called the novel "permanently stunning". In his review for Time, Vietnamese-American novelist Viet Thanh Nguyen wrote, "Vuong refuses to be embarrassed. He transforms the emotional, the visceral, the individual into the political in an unforgettable—indeed, gorgeous—novel, a book that seeks to affect its readers as profoundly as Little Dog is affected". Writing for the Los Angeles Times, Steph Cha called the novel "a book of sustained beauty and lyricism, earnest and relentless, a series of high notes that trembles exquisitely almost without break." Writing in The New Yorker, Jia Tolentino saw "structural hallmarks of Vuong's poetry—his skill with elision, juxtaposition, and sequencing" in the novel. For NPR, Heller McAlpin wrote, "Vuong's language soars as he writes of beauty, survival, and freedom". E. M. Tran, in the Harvard Review, found the novel's genre difficult to categorize but saw genre as beside the point, as "This writer puts into his letters all of his hurt, happiness, and self-discovery—and in giving a name to those memories and experiences, he brings them into being."

Dwight Garner of The New York Times gave the novel a mixed review, writing, "Vuong's writing about nail salons, and the way mothers raised their children in them, is moving and rarely less than excellent. On Earth We're Briefly Gorgeous is, at the same time, filled with showy, affected writing, with forced catharses and swollen quasi-profundities. There are enough of these that this novel's keel can lodge in the mud." Tessa Hadley, in The Guardian, found the subject matter moving but wrote, "the flow of the story is freighted with too much of a different kind of writing: an explicit commentary on the meaning of what's happening, or a sort of choric lyrical lamenting between scenes."

=== Censorship ===
In March 2023, the Conroe Independent School District in Texas removed the book from libraries, citing low circulation. Vuong and PEN America labeled the removal a book ban, and Vuong offered to send free copies of the book to local LGBTQ organizations.

In April 2024, a teacher at the International School Ho Chi Minh City handed out the novel to students, resulting in a post on an online group for parents calling the book "pornographic" and inappropriate for students. The school took back the books and reprimanded the teacher. Nguyen Nguyen of the Vietnamese government body Authority of Publication, Printing and Distribution attributed the reaction to differing views about whether children should learn about sexual matters.

=== Accolades ===
Organization (Note: Awards, festivals, honors and other miscellaneous organizations are listed in alphabetical order.)	Year (Note: Indicates the year of ceremony.)	Award	Result	Ref.
American Library Association	2020	Andrew Carnegie Medals	Longlisted	
American Library Association	2020	Stonewall Book Award for Literature	Honored	
Aspen Words	2020	Aspen Words Literary Prize	Longlisted	
Before Columbus Foundation	2020	American Book Awards	Won	
Bibliotekets litteraturpris	2022	Literature for Adults	Nominated	
Brooklyn Public Library	2020	Literary Prize for Fiction/Poetry	Won	
Connecticut Book Awards	2020	Fiction	Won	
Digital Book World	2019	Book (Fiction)	Won	
Dublin City Libraries	2021	Dublin Literary Award	Finalist (Note: This is also the final list before announcing the winners.)	
Dylan Thomas Prize	2020	Dylan Thomas Prize	Finalist	
Goodreads Choice Awards	2019	Debut Novel	Nominated	
Goodreads Choice Awards	2019	Fiction	Nominated	
Kirkus Reviews	2019	Kirkus Prize for Fiction	Finalist	
Lambda Literary Society	2020	Gay Fiction	Finalist	
Mark Twain House	2020	Mark Twain American Voice in Literature	Won	
Massachusetts Center for the Book	2020	Fiction	Won	
National Book Foundation	2019	Fiction	Longlisted	
New England Independent Booksellers Association	2019	Fiction	Won	
PEN America	2020	PEN/Hemingway Award for Debut Novel	Longlisted	
PEN/Faulkner Foundation	2020	PEN/Faulkner Award for Fiction	Finalist	
Publishing Triangle	2020	Ferro-Grumley Award	Won	
The Center for Fiction	2019	Center for Fiction First Novel Prize	Finalist	

== Listicles ==
=== Most Anticipated Books ===
Publisher	Year	Category	Ref.
BuzzFeed News	2019	66 Books Coming in 2019 That You'll Want to Keep on Your Radar	
Entertainment Weekly	2018	The 50 Most Anticipated Books of 2019	
HuffPost	2019	61 Books We're Looking Forward to Reading in 2019	
Literary Hub	2018	Most Anticipated Books of 2019	
Los Angeles Times	2019	11 Authors to Watch in 2019	
Nylon	2019	50 Best Books To Read In 2019	
Powell's Books	2019	We Can't Wait: The Best Reads of 2019	
The A.V. Club	2019	The 15 Most Anticipated Books of 2019	
The Boston Globe	2019	Books We Can't Wait to Read in 2019	
The Guardian	2019	2019 in Books: What You'll Be Reading This Year	
The Millions	2019	Most Anticipated: The Great First-Half 2019 Book Preview	
The Rumpus	2018	What to Read in 2019	
The Week	2019	15 Books to Read in 2019	
Vulture	2019	37 Books We Can't Wait to Read in 2019	

=== Year-End Lists ===
Publisher	Year	Category	Ref.
Amazon	2019	Best Books of the Year	
Boston.com	2019	18 Best Books of 2019	
BuzzFeed News	2019	Best Books Of 2019	
CBC.ca	2019	The Best International Fiction of 2019	
Chicago Public Library	2019	Best Books of 2019: Top Ten	
Elle	2019	The 28 Best Books of 2019	
Entertainment Weekly	2019	The 10 Best Books of 2019	
Entertainment Weekly	2019	The 10 Best Debut Novels of 2019	
Esquire	2019	The Best Books of 2019	
Good Housekeeping	2019	60 Best Books of 2019	
GQ	2019	The Best Books of 2019	
Kirkus Reviews	2019	Best Fiction Books of the Year	
Kirkus Reviews	2019	Best Debut Fiction of 2019	
Library Journal	2019	Best Books 2019 – Literary Fiction	
Literary Hub	2019	50 Favorite Books of the Year	
Literary Hub	2019	The Ultimate Best Books of 2019 List	
Los Angeles Times	2019	Best Books of 2019	
Mother Jones	2019	What We Read in 2019	
New York Public Library	2019	Best Books of 2019	
NPR	2019	Maureen Corrigan's Favorite Books Of 2019	
NPR	2019	NPR : Books We Love	
Paste	2019	The 19 Best Novels of 2019	
Penguin Random House	2019	Best Books of 2019	
PopMatters	2019	The Best Books of 2019: Fiction	
Powell's Books	2019	Staff Top Fives 2019	
San Francisco Chronicle	2019	These Are the Books That Stayed With Us in 2019	
The Dallas Morning News	2019	The Best Books of 2019	
The Guardian	2019	Best books of 2019 – Fiction	
The Guardian	2019	The Best Books of 2019 – Picked by the Year's Best Writers	
The Harvard Crimson	2019	Top 10 Books of 2019	
The New Yorker	2019	The Best Books of 2019	
The Sydney Morning Herald	2019	The Books We Loved in 2019	
The Washington Post	2019	Best Books of 2019	
Thrillist	2020	The 51 Best Books of 2019	
Time	2019	The 100 Must-Read Books of 2019	
Time	2019	The 10 Best Fiction Books of 2019	
Vanity Fair	2019	The Best Books of 2019	
Variety	2019	The Best Books of 2019	
Vogue	2019	10 Authors on The Best Books They Read This Year	

== Adaptation ==
A film adaptation of the novel by A24 was announced on the December 21, 2020, episode of The A24 Podcast. Bing Liu, director of Oscar-nominated documentary Minding the Gap, was attached to adapt the novel to screen. In an April 2022 profile in The New Yorker, Ocean Vuong announced they had recently finished writing the screenplay for the film. In July 2025, Bing Liu told IndieWire: "I developed it for a couple years, and there were creative differences. I'm no longer going to be a part of the project." According to IndieWire, A24 is still developing the adaptation.
