= Split This Rock =

American nonprofit literary organization

- Founded: March 2008; 18 years ago
- Founder: Sarah Browning and Melissa Tuckey
- Type: 501(c)(3) nonprofit
- Location: Washington, D.C., U.S.
- Region served: United States
- Website: splitthisrock.org

Split This Rock is a nonprofit organization based in Washington, D.C. that supports poetry and social activism. Founded in 2008, it was built from the DC Poets Against the War movement — which formed in response to the Iraq War — and takes its name from a poem by Langston Hughes. It is known for The Quarry: A Social Justice Poetry Database, a searchable online archive of contemporary poetry launched in 2015 and covered by the Washington Post as a resource for activists and educators.

== History ==
Split This Rock grew out of D.C. Poets Against the War, a poet-activist group organized in response to the 2003 invasion of Iraq. The organization's name derives from the Hughes poem "Big Buddy," written during the Great Depression, in which Hughes calls on artists and workers to stand in solidarity against injustice. The first Split This Rock Poetry Festival was held in March 2008 to coincide with the fifth anniversary of the invasion, drawing more than 300 participants and approximately 2,000 attendees across its events.

Co-founders Sarah Browning and Melissa Tuckey built the organization from that initial festival into a multi-program national organization. Browning served as Executive Director from the organization's founding until January 2019. In 2014 and 2018, Split This Rock collaborated with Poetry magazine, with Browning contributing introductions alongside portfolios of festival poets.

In July 2021 the organization entered what it called a "fallow season," pausing external programming to undertake a period of internal reflection and organizational development.

== Programs ==
=== The Quarry: A Social Justice Poetry Database ===
The Quarry: A Social Justice Poetry Database is an online searchable archive of contemporary poetry addressing social justice themes. Launched by Split This Rock in June 2015, it draws on poems the organization had published in its weekly Poem of the Week series since 2009, as well as contest winners and festival recordings. The Washington Post described it as "particularly unusual" for its search features, which allow users to locate poems not only by author and title but also by selecting from more than 40 social justice themes. The Poetry Foundation noted at its launch that it provided "a unique, rich resource" for organizers, teachers, social workers, and others planning public events. The name was chosen through a contest.

=== Split This Rock Poetry Festival ===
Split This Rock has held a biennial poetry festival—the Split This Rock Poetry Festival: Poems of Provocation & Witness—in Washington, D.C. since 2008. The festival combines readings, workshops, panel discussions, open mics, youth programming, and a social-change book fair. Festivals were held in 2008, 2010, 2012, 2014, 2016, and 2018; the 2020 festival, planned for March at George Washington University, was postponed due to the COVID-19 pandemic, and the organization subsequently offered virtual readings and a book fair through May and June of that year.

The second festival, held March 10–13, 2010, in Washington's U Street neighborhood, was covered by the Washington Post, which reported that featured poets included Chris Abani, Cornelius Eady, Andrea Gibson, Mark Nowak, Arthur Sze, and Quincy Troupe, among others. The 2018 festival marked Split This Rock's tenth anniversary and Browning's final festival as Executive Director; the accompanying Poetry magazine portfolio featured poets including Safia Elhillo, Eve L. Ewing, Javier Zamora, and Paul Tran.

=== Other programs ===
Split This Rock has run youth programming in the Washington, D.C. area, including the DC Youth Slam Team, the Louder Than a Bomb DC-MD-VA high school slam competition, and after-school writing clubs. The organization has held an annual poetry contest for emerging writers, renamed the Sonia Sanchez–Langston Hughes Poetry Contest after the poet Sonia Sanchez, who opened the first festival. Split This Rock co-founder Melissa Tuckey edited Ghost Fishing: An Eco-Justice Poetry Anthology, published in connection with the organization's Eco-Justice Project; a related portfolio co-edited by Tuckey appeared in Poetry magazine in January 2016.

== See also ==
- Busboys and Poets
- Langston Hughes
- Sonia Sanchez
