= Congolese Independence Speech =

1960 speech by Patrice Lumumba

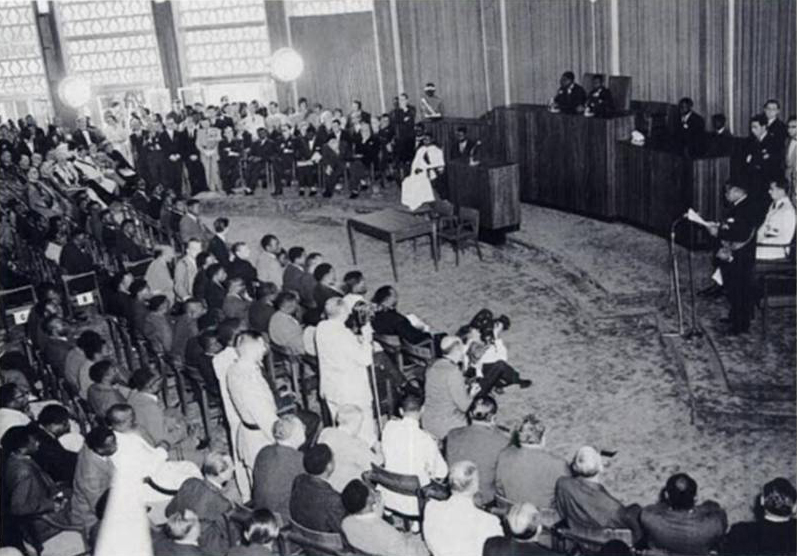
The independence ceremony for the Congo during which Lumumba delivered his speech. President Kasa-Vubu addresses the dignitaries while Lumumba can be seen making corrections to his draft.

The Speech at the Ceremony of the Proclamation of the Congo's Independence (French: Discours prononcé lors de la cérémonie de proclamation de l'indépendance du Congo) (Note: The speech has no formal title. In early printed editions, it was entitled "Speech at the Ceremony of the Proclamation of the Congo's Independence" but it is often referred to as "Lumumba's Independence Speech" or similar.) was a short political speech given by Patrice Lumumba on 30 June 1960 at the ceremonies marking the independence of the Republic of Congo (the modern-day Democratic Republic of the Congo) from Belgium. It is best known for its outspoken criticism of colonialism.

Lumumba, the first Congolese Prime Minister, gave the address during the official independence commemorations at the Palais de la Nation in Léopoldville (modern-day Kinshasa). The ceremony was intended to mark the harmonious end of Belgian rule and was attended by both Congolese and Belgian dignitaries, including King Baudouin. Lumumba's speech, which was itself unscheduled, was in large part a response to Baudouin's speech in which the end of colonial rule in the Congo had been depicted as the culmination of the Belgian "civilising mission" begun by Leopold II in the Congo Free State. Lumumba's speech, broadcast live on the radio across the world, denounced colonialism and was interpreted as an affront to Belgium and Baudouin personally. While it was well-received within the Congo, it was widely condemned internationally as unnecessarily confrontational and for showing ingratitude at a time when Belgium had granted independence to the state. The speech nearly provoked a diplomatic incident between the Congo and Belgium, and Lumumba later gave further speeches attempting to adopt a more conciliatory tone.

The speech itself has since been praised for its use of political rhetoric, and is considered a landmark moment in the independence of the Congo. It has also been cited as a contributary factor to the subsequent Congo Crisis and in Lumumba's murder in 1961. Since its delivery, the speech has been widely reprinted and has been depicted in paintings and film.

== Background ==
The Belgian Congo, today the Democratic Republic of the Congo, highlighted on a map of Africa

Colonial rule in the Congo began in the late 19th century. King Leopold II of Belgium, frustrated by Belgium's lack of international power and prestige, attempted to persuade the Belgian government to support colonial expansion around the then-largely unvisited Congo Basin. The Belgian government's ambivalence about the idea led Leopold to eventually create the colony on his own account. With support from a number of Western countries, who viewed Leopold as a useful buffer between rival colonial powers, Leopold achieved international recognition for a personal colony, the Congo Free State, in 1885. By the turn of the century, however, the atrocities committed by the Free State officials against indigenous Congolese and the ruthless system of economic extraction had led to intense diplomatic pressure on Belgium to take official control of the country, which it did in 1908, creating the Belgian Congo.

Belgian rule in the Congo was based around the "colonial trinity" (trinité coloniale) of state, missionary and private company interests. The privileging of Belgian commercial interests meant that large amounts of capital flowed into the Congo and that individual regions became specialised. On many occasions, the interests of the government and private enterprise became closely tied and the state helped companies break strikes and remove other barriers imposed by the indigenous population. The country was split into nesting, hierarchically organised administrative subdivisions, and run uniformly according to a set "native policy" (politique indigène)—in contrast to the British and the French, who generally favoured the system of indirect rule whereby traditional leaders were retained in positions of authority under colonial oversight. There was also a high degree of racial segregation. Large numbers of whites that moved to the Congo after the end of World War II came from across the social spectrum, but were nonetheless always treated as superior to blacks.

An African nationalist movement developed in the Belgian Congo during the 1950s, primarily among the black middle-class évolués. The movement was divided into a number of parties and groups which were broadly divided on ethnic and geographical lines and opposed to one another. The largest, the Mouvement National Congolais (MNC), was a united front organisation dedicated to achieving independence "within a reasonable" time and was led by, among others, Patrice Lumumba. The MNC's main rival was the Alliance des Bakongo (ABAKO), (Note: In most Bantu languages, the prefix ba- is added to a human noun to form a plural. As such, Bakongo refers collectively to members of the Kongo ethnic group.) led by Joseph Kasa-Vubu, who advocated a more radical ideology than the MNC, based around calls for immediate independence and the promotion of regional identity. In the aftermath of rioting in the capital Léopoldville (modern-day Kinshasa) in 1959, the independence of the Congo was agreed to be granted on 30 June 1960 and a constitution (loi fondamentale) was written, creating a semi-presidential constitution. Kasa-Vubu was proclaimed President, and Lumumba Prime Minister.

== The speech ==
=== Background and context ===
The speech was given as part of the official ceremony held at the Palais de la Nation in Léopoldville (modern-day Kinshasa) marking the end of Belgian colonial rule in the country.

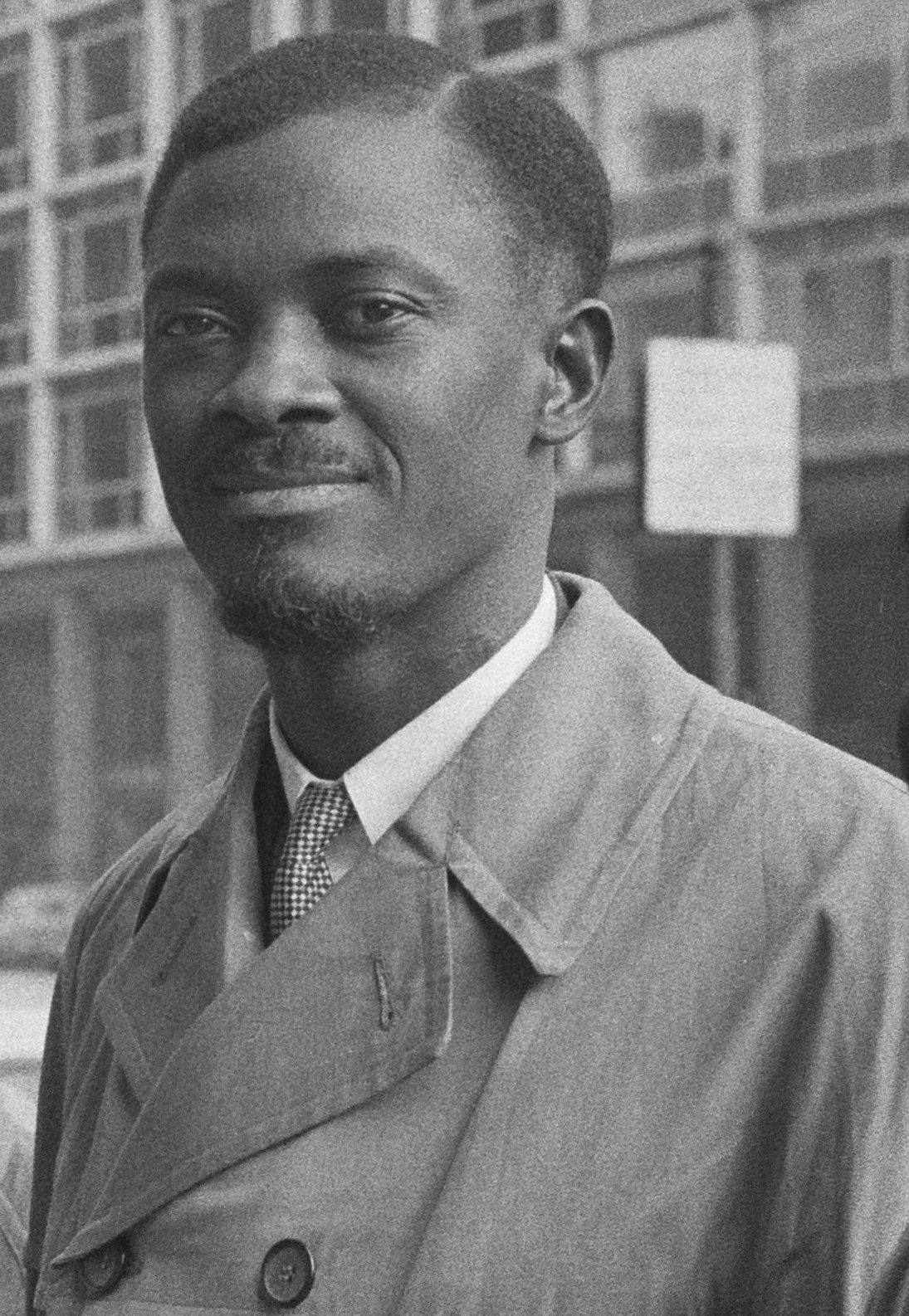
Patrice Lumumba, the Prime Minister-designate, photographed in January 1960

The official programme for the Independence Day celebrations began with a Te Deum at the Cathedral of Notre-Dame-du-Congo. The service began at 9:00 am, after which delegates returned to the Palais de la Nation which had been the residency of the Belgian Governor-General of the Congo. Some leading Congolese musicians, notably Joseph Kabaselleh and his band, Le Grand Kallé et l'African Jazz, performed specially-written songs commemorating independence there until 11:00 am. These included Indépendance Cha Cha, one of Kabaselleh's best-known works. After this, the official speeches—the main component of the day's festivities—began. In the audience were dignitaries from Belgium, the Congo, and various other countries as well as the international press.

King Baudouin, representing Belgium, gave the first speech in which he praised the "genius" of his ancestor, King Leopold II, who began the colonisation of the Congo on his own initiative in the 1880s. Baudouin depicted the end of colonial rule in the Congo as the culmination of the Belgian "civilising mission" and spoke of the close relations he hoped would be maintained between the two countries. The thousands of Congolese listening via loudspeakers outside the Palais were infuriated. Following the end of the speech Kasa-Vubu, as president, gave a short and uncontroversial address thanking the King for his attendance and for his best wishes. Both speeches were applauded vigorously. In a change to the schedule, Joseph Kasongo, the President of the Chamber of Deputies who was presiding over the ceremonies, invited Lumumba to give an address as Lumumba had requested him to do so. The invitation came as a surprise to the audience, who had not expected Lumumba, as Prime Minister, to take any part in the ceremony.

Lumumba had seen a copy of Kasa-Vubu's speech and concluded it was insufficient. Kasongo and Thomas Kanza, a member of Lumumba's government, had been requested to visit the prime minister at his private house on the morning of 30 June before the start of the ceremonies to look over an early draft of Lumumba's planned speech. Also present were two secretaries of state and two Belgians. (One of the latter may have been the pacifist Jean Van Lierde. (Note: Kanza describes the presence of one lawyer with whom he was acquainted and "a young Belgian with a beard...[who] had worked against colonialism in Stanleyville, which had won him the good opinion and trust of Lumumba and other important members of the MNC...")) Lumumba asked Kanza, "Will you work out here with these others here to tidy up the text, and make it acceptable – a bit less explosive?"

Less than an hour before the independence ceremony a Belgian officer arrived to request that Lumumba depart for Parliament. Kasongo was disturbed by what Lumumba planned to say and told Kanza as he left, "I'm counting on you to do your best to tone down that speech." As Lumumba dressed, Kanza and one of the secretaries, André Mandi, read through as much of the speech as they could, replacing some individual words with less inflammatory language and crossing out several full paragraphs deemed too difficult to temper. Lumumba then left in a motorcade for his official residence to rendezvous with the rest of his government. Kanza and Mandi followed in the second car, making additional revisions to the speech. These were so extensive that both feared Lumumba would be unable to clearly read his remarks. Upon their arrival at the residence, Kanza and Mandi briefly explained their alterations to Lumumba. Greatly pleased with the result, Lumumba stated that he would read some parts of the speech verbatim, then improvise to respond to the atmosphere in the room as he saw fit. He made his own alterations to the script during the speeches given by Baudouin and Kasa-Vubu.

=== Content ===
"Although this independence of the Congo is being proclaimed today by agreement with Belgium, an amicable country, with which we are on equal terms, no Congolese will ever forget that independence was won in struggle, a persevering and inspired struggle carried on from day to day, a struggle, in which we were undaunted by privation or suffering and stinted neither strength nor blood."

— Extract from the speech

The speech begins with Lumumba addressing his speech to the Congolese people and praising independence as the culmination of the struggle of the nationalist movement, rather than the result of Belgian concessions. He outlines the personal suffering of the nationalists before enumerating the suffering of ordinary Congolese people under colonialism, through forced labour, systematic racial discrimination, land seizure, wealth disparity and physical maltreatment at the hand of the colonial state.

Lumumba states that these forms of suffering would be ended by independence. Through its democratic institutions, Congolese self-government would deliver social justice and fair wages. Racial discrimination and repression would be abolished and the Congo would become "the pride of Africa" and an example to the Pan-African movement. Lumumba called upon other states, particularly Belgium, to support the Congo to establish mutually beneficial relations between the "two equal and independent countries". He also appealed to the Congolese to abandon internecine tribal conflict.

Concluding, Lumumba appealed to all the Congolese to make sacrifices for the future of the Congo. Lumumba finally called for Congolese people to respect the rights of non-indigenous settlers in the country, and warned that if they breached Congolese laws they would be exiled. The speech finishes with the observation that "the Congo's independence is a decisive step towards the liberation of the whole African continent" and the exclamations "Long live independence and African unity! Long live the independent and sovereign Congo!"

The speech was originally delivered in the French language.

=== Analysis ===
The speech has been praised for its use of political rhetoric. In particular, the speech has been cited as exemplifying the three functions of rhetoric; by the way it was framed within the independence proceeding, its deliberative function and oratorical vibrancy. Others have argued that the dynamics between Lumumba, Kasa-Vubu and Baudouin during the ceremony "represent a microcosm of the relations between Africans and Europeans" in early post-colonial Africa, with each representing a different stance towards the others.

Political scientist Georges Nzongola-Ntalaja hailed the speech as a "classic of African nationalism" and praised for providing a response to the "patronizing" speech given by Baudouin or as an example of speaking the truth to power. It was also praised as a public exposé of traits of colonialism glossed over during the independence ceremonies.

Political scientist Jean-Claude Willame argued that the speech was the result of Lumumba's growing frustration with the process of independence which he believed might represent a purely nominal change in government with no real effects. Lumumba blamed Kasa-Vubu and his colleagues for failing to publicly oppose this situation. Gender historian Karen Bouwer therefore argued that the speech was the result of Lumumba's growing feeling of emasculation. Others have pointed to the influence of Belgian Socialist delegates and representatives of the Guinean President, Ahmed Sékou Touré, who had a strongly Marxist ideology, all of whom hoped a public and international denunciation of colonialism would help them politically.

Historian David Van Reybrouck praised the speech as "memorable", but argued that it damaged Lumumba's own legacy. Since Lumumba and his party represented only a third of Congolese popular opinion, Van Reybrouck accused Lumumba's claim to speak for all Congolese people "divisive" and questioned whether it was appropriate given the context: "Lumumba's address contained more of a look back than a look forward, more rage than hope, more rancour than magnanimity, and therefore more rebellion than statesmanship". He also compared it to the Communist Julien Lahaut's republican heckling of Baudouin's coronation in 1950. Like Lumumba, Lahaut was subsequently murdered after he had "claimed all the attention" at the public event.

== Reception ==
"... on an occasion, when the calibre of Congolese leadership was under the microscope ... Lumumba's speech soured the taste of many. The Congo has need of all the unselfish friends she can attract, and equally needs to keep those she already possesses."

— Report in the British newspaper, The Guardian, 1 July 1960

The speech was applauded by Congolese delegates in the audience at the Palais de la Nation and broadcast by radio across the country. It was also broadcast live in Belgium by the state broadcaster, RTBF. After its delivery, the ceremonies were halted. The Belgian delegation found the oration deeply insulting; the king promptly exited the room after its delivery and Joseph Mobutu reported that other diplomats had tears in their eyes. Lumumba was surprised by the Belgian reaction, telling a delegate that his remarks were consistent with previous statements he had given. A short inspection of local sites was arranged with Kasa-Vubu and lunch was served to cover the delay and an official lunch was held by the Congo River. Kanza tried to mollify the situation by presenting the speech to others in a moderate fashion while Congolese Minister of Foreign Affairs Justin Marie Bomboko convinced Baudouin not to leave the celebrations, assuring him that Lumumba would clarify his intent in further remarks.

After the break, Lumumba was persuaded by the outgoing Belgian resident, Walter Ganshof van der Meersch, to give a second speech which attempted to strike a more conciliatory tone between the two countries. In his second speech, Lumumba praised Baudouin and stated that "I would not wish my feelings to be wrongly interpreted". After Lumumba's second speech, the official act of independence was signed by Lumumba and the Belgian Prime Minister Gaston Eyskens, as well as by the foreign ministers of both countries, bringing the official ceremonies to an end. The delegates then visited a performance of Congolese folklore at the Roi Baudouin Stadium before heading to an evening reception. At this event, Lumumba gave a further conciliatory speech the same evening, written for him by Eyskens, and drank a toast to Baudouin. The King, and much of the Belgian delegation, returned to Brussels on 1 July. He did not come back to the Congo until June 1970.

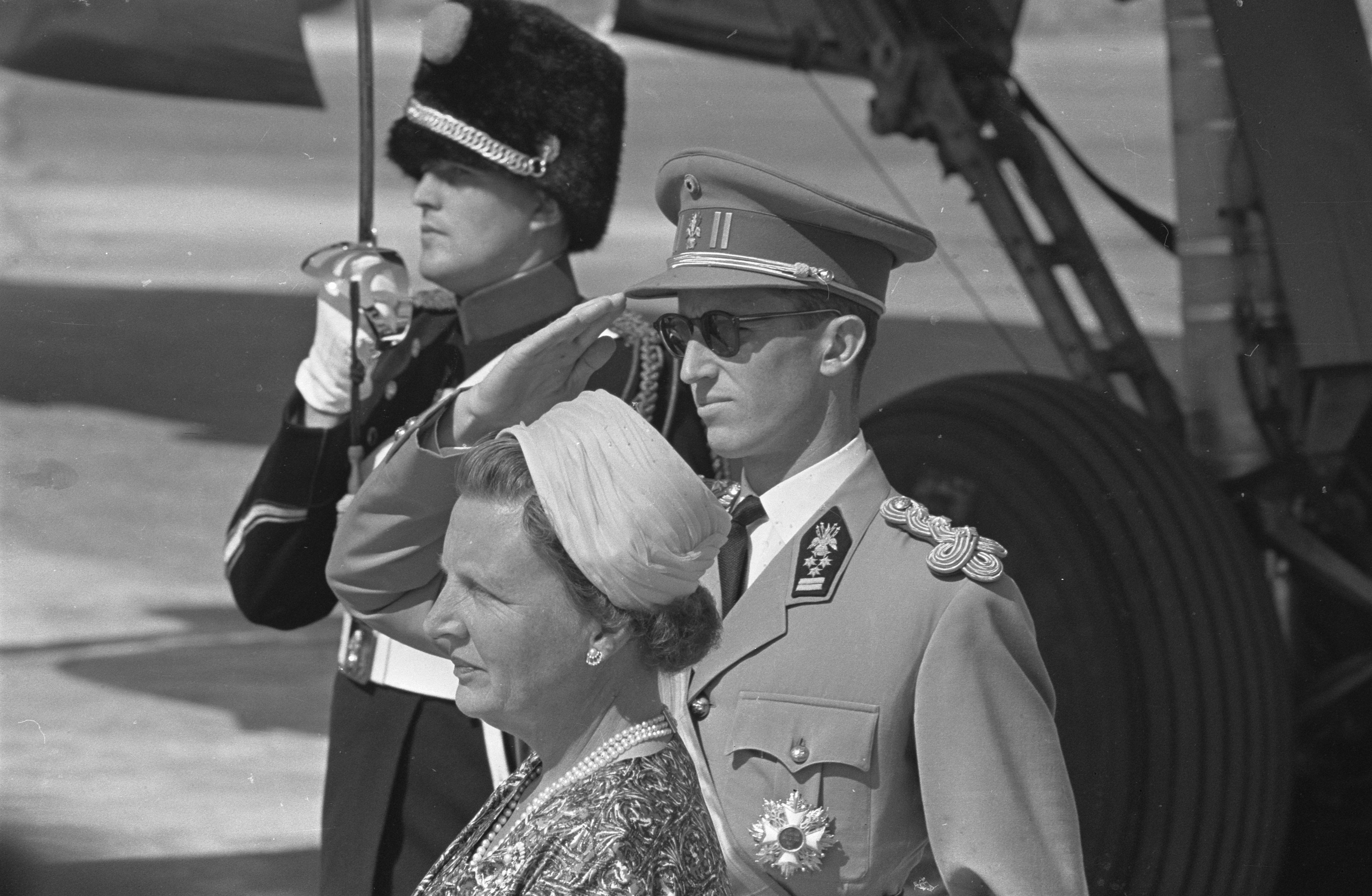
Lumumba's speech was interpreted as a personal attack on King Baudouin, pictured in 1959, which nearly caused a diplomatic incident.

The majority international reaction was extremely critical of Lumumba. Instead of directly reproducing the speech, most publications paraphrased it in negative terms. Lumumba's attack on colonialism was especially interpreted as an attack on Belgium itself and nearly provoked a diplomatic incident between the two countries. Belgian media reaction to the address marked a dramatic shift in the press' coverage of him towards a more negative tone. International observers thought the speech unwise, ungrateful and tactless. The confrontational attitude taken by Lumumba appeared to confirm Belgian and American suspicions that Lumumba was a dangerous radical. When interviewed about the incident, Eyskens said "this speech caused a lot of disappointment" but pointed to Lumumba's subsequent conciliatory remarks with pleasure. Other observers, including U.S. Ambassador Clare H. Timberlake and UN diplomat Ralph Bunche, thought the second speech demonstrated that the prime minister was two-faced. Lumumba, for his part, was greatly annoyed by the Belgian hostility to his address and thought it served as additional proof that Belgium was undermining him.

Copies of Lumumba's speech were circulated around the Congo. The address initially received a mixed reception within the country. In some quarters it was widely supported. However, some believed that it merely highlighted the fact that Lumumba was inexperienced—and overly provocative—in comparison with Kasa-Vubu's measured and diplomatic approach. Members of Lumumba's own party and Kanza praised the speech itself but believed that the venue in which it had been delivered was inappropriate. The European residents of Katanga Province were particularly angered by it. In Parliament, Albert Kalonji, with the support of other deputies, filed an interpellation against Lumumba, requesting that he explain the provocative nature of his oration. He also wired an apology to Brussels, stating that the Prime Minister's statements did not represent Congolese opinion. Lumumba's address was also acclaimed by figures within the international Pan-African and Black Power movements, including Malcolm X. The speech may have further heightened racial violence between native Congolese and white settlers, who were already distrustful of the new government.

As a result of the threat to its expatriates, Belgium deployed troops to the country and, amid mounting violence, several regions of the Congo, notably Katanga, seceded and declared their own independence, starting five-years of violence and political unrest known as the Congo Crisis. Between September 1960 and January 1961, partly at the instigation of the Belgium and the United States, Lumumba was deposed from power, arrested and executed with the complicity of both the Congolese and Katangese governments. Archival materials reviewed by the Belgian parliamentary inquiry show that several Belgian plans for Lumumba's physical elimination circulated among diplomats and officers, none of which were discouraged by the Belgian government. Among the documents was a memorandum personally annotated by King Baudouin, agreeing that Lumumba should be "neutralized, physically if possible", suggesting quiet approval by the monarchy of the elimination efforts.

== Legacy ==
Le 30 juni 1960 (c. 1970) by Tshibumba Kanda-Matulu. The painting shows a romanticised portrayal of the speech

While the speech was filmed during its delivery, the film of the speech has only survived as fragments and in some sections only the original audio survives. Transcriptions of the speech were later published in multiple print editions, some of which were altered as propaganda to show Lumumba in a better light after his death in 1961. Today, the speech forms an important part of Congolese popular memory, particularly among "Lumumbists" who claim to represent Lumumba's ideological position in modern Congolese politics.

The scene was painted by Congolese artist Tshibumba Kanda-Matulu in his distinctive cartoon-like style. The result, entitled Le 30 juni 1960, Zaïre indépendant and painted between 1970-1973, hangs in the Virginia Museum of Fine Arts. The speech itself was dramatized in the 2000 film, Lumumba, directed by Raoul Peck in which Eriq Ebouaney played the role of Lumumba. It was backed by a specially composed score, entitled Le Discours ("The Speech"), by the French composer Jean-Claude Petit.

== See also ==
- Ambroise Boimbo

== Bibliography ==
- "Assassinat de Patrice Lumumba: vers un procès en Belgique?" [Assassination of Patrice Lumumba: Towards a Trial in Belgium?] (in French). Radio France International (RFI). 14 December 2012.
- Bonyeka, Bomandeke (1992). Le Parlement congolais sous le régime de la Loi fondamentale [The Congolese Parliament Under the Regime of the Basic Law] (in French). Kinshasa: Presses universitaire du Zaire. OCLC 716913628.
- Bouwer, Karen (2010). Gender and Decolonization in the Congo: The Legacy of Patrice Lumumba (1st ed.). New York: Palgrave Macmillan. ISBN 978-0-230-61557-1.
- De Bok, Marrigje (June 2004). "Congo in Cartoons in the Tropenmuseum". The Power of Culture. Archived from the original on 8 May 2021.
- The Congo Crisis, 1960-1961: A Critical Oral History Conference (PDF), Washington, D.C.: Woodrow Wilson International Center for Scholars, 28 November 2011, archived from the original (PDF) on 5 July 2017
- De Groof, Matthias, ed. (2020). Lumumba in the Arts. Leuven: Leuven University Press. ISBN 9789462701748.
- Dunn, Kevin (2003). Imagining the Congo: The International Relations of Identity (illustrated ed.). Springer. ISBN 9781403979261.
- Freund, Bill (1998). The Making of Contemporary Africa: The Development of African Society since 1800 (2nd ed.). Basingstoke: Palgrave-Macmillan. ISBN 978-0-333-69872-3.
- Govender, Robert (1971). The Martyrdom of Patrice Lumumba. London: Neillgo. OCLC 973704.
- Holland, Robert (2013). "Preface: The Midnight Hour". In Holland, Robert; Williams, Susan; Barringer, Terry (eds.). The Iconography of Independence: 'Freedoms at Midnight'. Routledge. ISBN 9781317988656.
- Hoskyns, Catherine (1965). The Congo Since Independence: January 1960 – December 1961. London: Oxford University Press. OCLC 414961.
- Kanza, Thomas R. (1994). The Rise and Fall of Patrice Lumumba: Conflict in the Congo (expanded ed.). Rochester, Vermont: Schenkman Books, Inc. ISBN 0-87073-901-8.
- "Le Temps Colonial: Congo et imagerie populaire" [Colonial Times: Congo and Popular Imagery] (PDF) (in French). Congo Forum.
- Lumumba, Patrice (1961). "Speech at the Ceremony of the Proclamation of the Congo's Independence". Patrice Lumumba, The Truth about a Monstrous Crime of the Colonialists. Translated by Thomas Schmidt. Moscow: Foreign Languages Publishing House. pp. 44–47.
- "Lumumba: 50 jaar na de moord" (in Dutch). INTAL. 2011.
- Pakenham, Thomas (1992). The Scramble for Africa: the White Man's Conquest of the Dark Continent from 1876 to 1912 (13th ed.). London: Abacus. ISBN 978-0-349-10449-2.
- Mbu-Mputu, Norbert X (2010). Patrice Lumumba: Discours, Lettres, Textes. Paris: Lulu. ISBN 978-1-4092-9381-1.
- Nzongola-Ntalaja, Georges (2007). The Congo, From Leopold to Kabila: A People's History (3rd ed.). New York: Palgrave. ISBN 978-1-84277-053-5.
- "Marred: M. Lumumba's offensive speech in King's presence". The Guardian. 1 July 1960.
- Reid, Stuart A. (2023). The Lumumba Plot. New York: Alfred A. Knopf. ISBN 9781524748814.
- Pfefferle, Tim (2013). Lumumba's Independence Speech: Marking the Transition Towards a Free Africa. Wissen: Grin Verlag. ISBN 978-3-656-41941-9.
- Salazar, Ph.-J. (2011). "Patrice Lumumba: The Congo Independence Speech" (PDF). African Yearbook of Rhetoric. 2 (3): 41–3. Archived from the original on October 26, 2014.
- Turner, Thomas (2007). The Congo Wars: Conflict, Myth, and Reality (2nd ed.). London: Zed Books. ISBN 978-1-84277-688-9.
- Van Reybrouck, David (2014). Congo: The Epic History of a People. London: Fourth Estate. ISBN 978-0-00-756290-9.
- Young, M. Crawford; Turner, Thomas Edwin (2013). The Rise and Decline of the Zairian State (illustrated, reprint ed.). University of Wisconsin Press. ISBN 9780299101138.
- Zeilig, Leo (2008). Lumumba: Africa's Lost Leader. London: Haus. ISBN 978-1-905791-02-6.
