= Annejet van der Zijl =

Dutch writer and historian (born 1962)

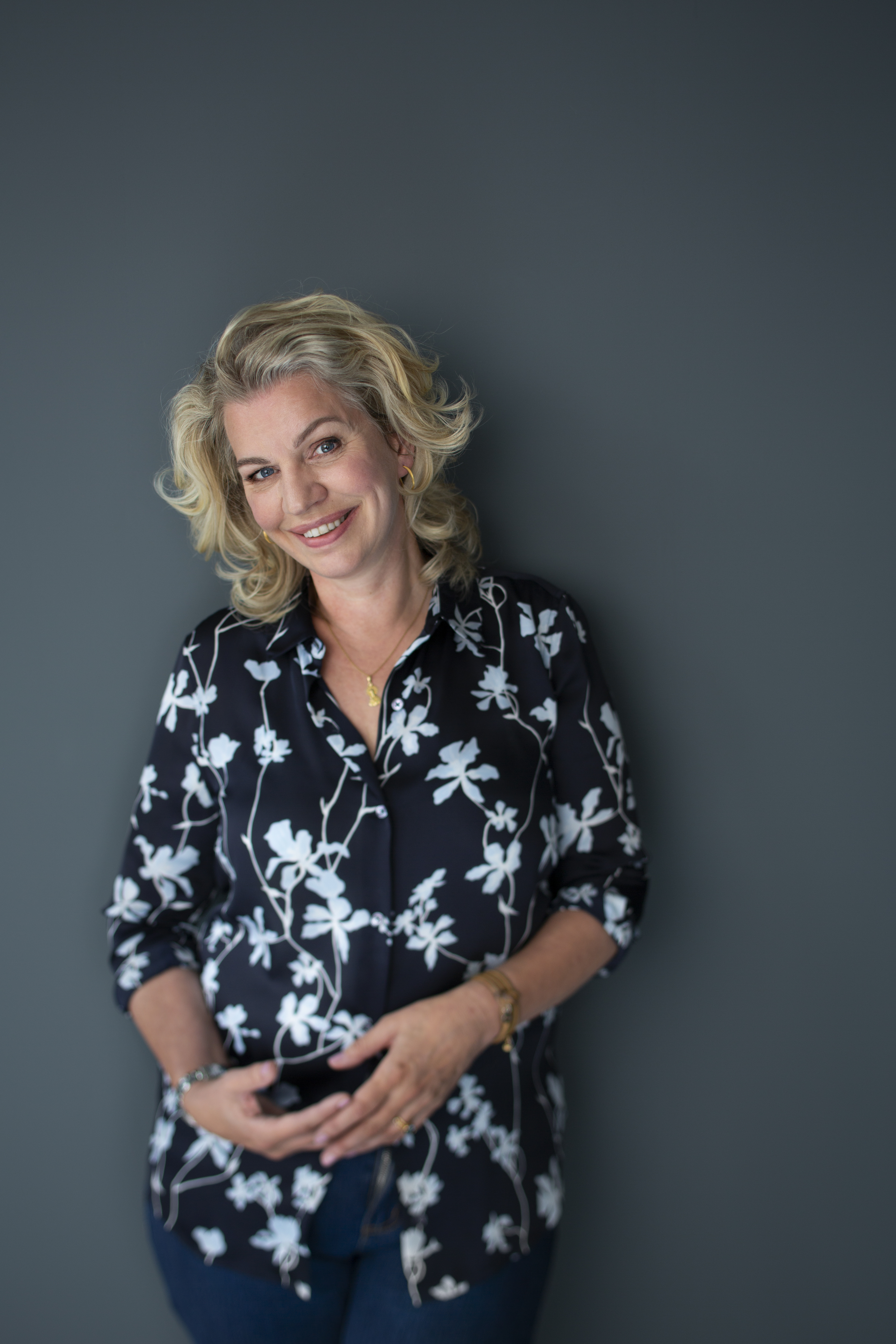
- Annejet van der Zijl in 2021
- Born: 6 April 1962 (age 64); Oterleek, Netherlands
- Occupation: Novelist
- Writing career
- Notable works: The Boy Between Worlds; An American Princess: The Many Lives of Allene Tew
- Website: www.annejetvanderzijl.com

Annejet van der Zijl (born 6 April 1962) is a well-known and widely read writer in the Netherlands. So far, she has written seven non-fiction books and one fiction book, most of which have become bestsellers. Her work has been awarded the Gouden Ganzenveer (Golden Quill) and the Amsterdam Prize for the Arts.

== Biography ==
Annejet was born into a family of teachers in Oterleek. After moving to Friesland, she received her high-school education at the Christelijk Gymnasium in Leeuwarden. She started doing a degree in Art History, but ended up getting a degree in Mass Communication at the University of Amsterdam instead. In 1998, Annejet took a Master’s degree in International Journalism in London. After a few internships in England and the Netherlands, she became an editor at HP/De Tijd. Annejet specialized in reconstructions, as well as portraits of famous and unknown people, and of groups of people who went through challenging time periods together, an example being Dutch people leaving for Paris in May 1968. She also wrote about crimes and political events, such as the Amsterdam coronation riots on Dutch Queen’s Day in 1980.

== Writing career ==
Annejet's writing career began in 1998, when she made her debut with Jagtlust, a reconstruction of the illustrious artists’ colony of the same name in the Netherlands’ Gooi region. The award-winning biography Anna, het leven van Annie M.G. Schmidt (Anna: The Life of Annie M.G. Schmidt, 2002) subsequently put her on the map as “the queen of literary non-fiction” (Pieter Steinz in the NRC Handelsblad). The book served as a basis for the drama series Annie M.G., produced by Ruud Bos, and for the musical Was getekend, Annie M.G. Schmidt with Simone Kleinsma.

In 2004, Annejet published the true love story Sonny Boy, which has sold more than 700,000 copies in the Netherlands alone. This book also received an award and was adapted into a film in 2011. The sixtieth anniversary edition was released in 2021. The book has been translated into many languages and become an international bestseller, especially in the United States, where it was published in 2019 under the title The Boy Between Worlds.

In 2009, Annejet obtained her doctorate in history with the biography Bernhard, een verborgen geschiedenis (Bernhard: A Hidden History). The story of the former Dutch prince’s German background was awarded the M.J. Brusse Prize for Best Journalistic Book. Just like Gerard Heineken—the story of the founder of the famous beer brand and a history of Amsterdam—this book was also nominated for the Libris History Prize.

In 2015, she published De Amerikaanse prinses, a reconstruction of the eventful life of Allene Tew, the American godmother of Princess Beatrix, which occupied the top of the bestseller list for weeks. More than 250,000 copies have been sold to date. In 2018, the book was published in English translation. An American Princess: The Many Lives of Allene Tew, became a Wall Street Journal bestseller and was named one of the best books of the year in 2019 by Man Booker Prize winner Hilary Mantel in The Guardian. The film rights have been bought by Joop van de Ende, and the book will serve as the basis for a Dutch-British television series.

The international success gave Annejet the courage to take on the reconstruction of the nineteenth century love story Leon & Juliette, which was the featured book of the 2020 Dutch Book Week. This story became the prelude to the transatlantic family chronicle Fortuna’s kinderen (Fortune’s Children), which was published in the Netherlands in the autumn of 2021. As of 15 February 2022, the book has been in the top 20 of the Dutch top 60 bestseller list for 20 consecutive weeks. Reviewers from NRC Handelsblad, HP/De Tijd, and the Volkskrant have praised the book.

Annejet also worked in journalism for several years, which included work as a crime reporter. A selection of her crime stories appeared in 2014 under the title Moord in de Bloedstraat (Murder on Blood Street). This period also served as inspiration for De val van Annika S. (The Fall of Annika S.), Annejet’s first work of fiction, published in 2018 with Jo Simons. The film rights have since been sold. The second part of the story, titled Rijke mensen zijn anders (The Rich are Different), is expected to be published in the spring of 2022.

== Prizes ==
- 2003: Zeeuwse Boekenprijs – Anna
- 2006: Littéraire Witte Prijs
- 2010: M.J. Brusseprijs – Bernhard
- 2012: Gouden Ganzenveer
- 2016: Amsterdamprijs voor de Kunst

== Bibliography ==
- Jagtlust. J.M. Meulenhoff, Amsterdam, 1998.
  - Second revised edition. Nijgh & Van Ditmar, Amsterdam, 2005. ISBN 90 388 87329
  - Tenth revised edition. Jagtlust & verwante verhalen. Querido, Amsterdam, 2012. ISBN 978 90 214 42648
- Anna. Het leven van Annie M.G. Schmidt. Nijgh & Van Ditmar, Amsterdam, 2002. ISBN 978 90 388 87524 / ISBN 978 90 388 87333
- Sonny Boy. Nijgh & Van Ditmar, Amsterdam, 2004. ISBN 90 388 87353. English translation: The Boy Between Worlds (2019), translated by Kristen Gehrman. ISBN 9021424088
- Sonny Boy, including De dageraad (pilot study). On the occasion of the 25th edition of Sonny Boy; Querido, Amsterdam, 2009. ISBN 978 90 214 37682
- Bernhard. Een verborgen geschiedenis. Querido, Amsterdam, 2010. ISBN 978 90 214 37644
- Moord in de Bloedstraat (en andere verhalen). Querido, 2013, ISBN 978 90 214 46837
- Een dag om nooit te vergeten, 30 april 1980 - de stad, de krakers en de koningin, Querido, 2013. ISBN 978 90 214 4895 4
- Gerard Heineken. De man, de stad en het bier. Querido/Bas Lubberhuizen, Amsterdam, 2014. ISBN 978 90 214 55440
- De Amerikaanse prinses. Querido, Amsterdam, 2015. ISBN 978 90 214 00747. English translation: An American Princess: The Many Lives of Allene Tew (2018), translated by Michele Hutchinson. ISBN 1503951839
- De dageraad, 2017 ISBN 978 90 214 06138
- De val van Annika S., 2018. co-written with Jo Simons, ISBN 978 90 488 41882
- Leon en Juliette. CPNB, 2020. ISBN 978 90 596 55140, Dutch 'Book Week' gift
- Fortuna's kinderen, 2021. ISBN 978 90 488 62412
