= Libris History Prize =

Dutch literary history prize

The Libris History Prize (formerly known as Great History Prize and Historisch Nieuwsblad/Volkskrant Prize) rewards history books originally written in Dutch, that appeal to a general audience. Originality, readability and historical soundness are the most important criteria. Established in 2007, it is awarded annually since 2009 by Libris, an association of independent Dutch booksellers, and amounts to €20,000 for the winner. All applications go through a selection process out of which a longlist of ten books are selected and announced. Subsequently, another selection round takes place which nominates a shortlist of the five best books. The author of each shortlisted book receives €1,500. Typically, the (independent) jury's selection is discussed and criticized in the Dutch press.

The prize is an initiative of Historisch Nieuwsblad, Libris, the Netherlands Open Air Museum, the Rijksmuseum, the NPS/VPRO and de Volkskrant.

The Libris History Prize is the (historical) non-fiction prize in the Netherlands, while the Libris Literature Award rewards works of fiction.

== Winners ==
Year	Title	Author	ISBN code	ISBN ebook
2026	Dubbelleven. Geertruida Kapteyn-Muysken en haar rebelse levensfilosofie	Maite Karssenberg	978-90-295-4776-5	-
2025	Dievenland	Janna Coomans	978-94-031-3377-5	978-94-031-3583-0
2024	Het kleedje voor Hitler	Bas von Benda-Beckmann	9789021469072	9789021469089
2023	De Zanzibardriehoek: Een slavernijgeschiedenis 1860-1920	Martin Bossenbroek	9789025313746	9789025313739
2022	De zwijger: Het leven van Willem van Oranje	René van Stipriaan	9789021402758	9789021402765
2021	Erasmus. Dwarsdenker. Een biografie	Sandra Langereis	9789403120317	9789403127118
2020	Liever dier dan mens	Pieter van Os	9789044636710	9789044636703
2019	Dichter in de jungle. John Gabriel Stedman, 1744-1797	Roelof van Gelder	9789045032726	9789045032733
2018	Nobel streven. Het onwaarschijnlijke maar waargebeurde verhaal van ridder Jan van Brederode	Frits van Oostrom	9789044634679	9789044640410
2017	Selma. Aan Hitler ontsnapt. Gevangene van Mao	Carolijn Visser	9789045024448	9789045024455
2016	Cécile en Elsa, strijdbare freules	Elisabeth Leijnse	9789044534825	9789044529067
2015	De Stamhouder. Een familiekroniek	Alexander Münninghoff	9789035142268	9789035142275
2014	Koning Willem III 1817-1890	Dik van der Meulen	9789461051868	9789461274847
2013	De boerenoorlog	Martin Bossenbroek	9789025369934	9789025369941
2012	Wij weten niets van hun lot. Gewone Nederlanders en de Holocaust	Bart van der Boom	9789461054777	9789024451593
2011	Kameraad Baron	Jaap Scholten	9789025438654	9789025438272
2010	Congo: a history	David Van Reybrouck	9789023458661	9789023456391
2009	Weest manlijk, zijt sterk. Pim Boellaard (1903-2001). Het leven van een verzetsheld	Jolande Withuis	9789023427834	9789023450153
2008	Gevaarlijke kennis. Inzicht en angst in de dagen van Jan Swammerdam	Luuc Kooijmans	9789035132504	9789035132504
2007	Een nieuwe wereld. Het ontstaan van het moderne Nederland	Auke van der Woud	9789035135659	

== Shortlist nominees ==
Year	Country	Title	Author	ISBN code	ISBN ebook
2023	Netherlands	De macht van het verleden: Geschiedenis als politiek wapen	Ivo van Wijdeven	9789000374205	9789000374212
2023	Netherlands	Hoog Spel: De politieke biografie van Shell	Marcel Metze	9789463822695	9789463823043
2023	Netherlands	Etty Hillesum: Het verhaal van haar leven	Judith Koelemeijer	9789463821742	9789463822541
2023	Netherlands	De Chinezenmoord: Batavia en het bloedbad van 1740	Leonard Blussé	9789463821810	9789463822794
2023	Netherlands	De Zanzibardriehoek: Een slavernijgeschiedenis 1860-1920	Martin Bossenbroek	9789025313746	9789025313739
2022	Netherlands	De politiek van het kleinste kwaad	Bart van der Boom	9789024444878	9789024445813
2022	Netherlands	De Weimarrepubliek 1918-1933	Patrick Dassen	9789028213012	9789028210912
2022	Netherlands	De strijd om Bali. Imperialisme, verzet en onafhankelijkheid 1846-1950	Anne-Lot Hoek	9789403152318	9789403159713
2022	Netherlands	Het monsterschip	Luc Panhuysen	9789045048437	9789045040721
2022	Netherlands	De Zwijger	René van Stipriaan	9789021402758	9789021402765
2021	Netherlands	Moederstad. Jakarta, een familiegeschiedenis	Philip Dröge	9789000365302	9789000365319
2021	Netherlands	Willem Drees. Daadkracht en idealisme	Jelle Gaemers	9789024435487	
2021	Netherlands	Denken is verrukkelijk. Het leven van Tatiana Afanassjewa en Paul Ehrenfest	Margriet van der Heijden	9789403183404	
2021	Belgium	Revolusi. Indonesië en het ontstaan van de moderne wereld	David Van Reybrouck	9789403183404	9789403184401
2021	Netherlands	Erasmus. Dwarsdenker. Een biografie	Sandra Langereis	9789403120317	9789403127118
2020	Netherlands	De hoeve en het hart. Een boerenfamilie in de Gouden Eeuw	Enny de Bruin	9789044640618	
2020	Netherlands	Missievaders. Een familiegeschiedenis van katholieke wereldverbeteraars	Mar Oomen	9789024435487	9789045032757
2020	Netherlands	De kolonieman. Johannes van den Bosch 1780-1844. Volksverheffer in naam van de koning	Angelie Sens	9789463823173	9789460039027
2020	Netherlands	Eens ging de zee hier tekeer. Het verhaal van de Zuiderzee en haar kustbewoners	Eva Vriend	9789045045306	9789045036328
2020	Netherlands	Liever dier dan Mens	Pieter van Os	9789044636710	9789044636703
2019	Netherlands	De rechtvaardigen	Jan Brokken	9789045038827	
2019	Netherlands	Dichter in de Jingle	Roelof van Gelder	9789045041582	9789045032733
2019	Belgium	De Bourgondiërs	Bart van Loo	9789403139005	9789403145402
2019	Netherlands	De eeuw van Gisèle	Annet Mooij	9789403118505	9789403127804
2019	Netherlands	De avant-gardisten	Sjeng Scheijen	9789044643954	
2018	Netherlands	Thorbecke wil het. Biografie van een staatsman	Remieg Aerts	9789035139992	
2018	Netherlands	Koloniale oorlogen in Indonesië. Vijf eeuwen verzet tegen vreemde overheersing	Piet Hagen	9789029507172	
2018	Netherlands	Nobel streven. Het onwaarschijnlijke maar waargebeurde verhaal van ridder Jan van Brederode	Frits van Oostrom	9789044641035	9789044640410
2018	Netherlands	De sigarenfabriek van Isay Rottenberg. De verborgen geschiedenis van een Joodse Amsterdammer in nazi-Duitsland	Hella en Sandra Rottenberg	9789045031026	9789045031033
2018	Netherlands	De toren van de Gouden Eeuw. Een Hollandse strijd tussen gulden en God	Gabri van Tussenbroek	9789044634785	
2017	Netherlands	Fout in de oorlog. Nederland in tweestrijd, 1945-1989	Martin Bossenbroek	9789035136922	
2017	United States	Jacobs vlucht. Een familiesaga uit de Gouden Eeuw	Craig Harline	9789460042997	
2017	Netherlands	Het verboden boek. Mein Kampf en de aantrekkingskracht van het nazisme	Ewoud Kieft	9789046707265	
2017	Netherlands	Oranje tegen de Zonnekoning. De strijd tussen Willem III en Lodewijk XIV om Europa	Luc Panhuysen	9789045023298	
2017	Netherlands	Selma. Aan Hitler ontsnapt. Gevangene van Mao	Carolijn Visser	9789045024448	
2016	Netherlands	De roofkoning. Prins Willem III en de invasie van Engeland	Machiel Bosman	9789025306038	
2016	Netherlands	Moresnet. Opkomst en ondergang van een vergeten buurlandje	Philip Dröge	9789049806590	
2016	Netherlands	Cécile en Elsa, strijdbare freules	Elisabeth Leijnse	9789044537918	
2016	Netherlands	De vergeten bankencrisis	Lodewijk Petram	9789045027685	
2016	Netherlands	De Amerikaanse prinses	Annejet van der Zijl	9789021400730	
2015	Netherlands	Gouden jaren	Annegreet van Bergen	9789045033068	
2015	Netherlands	Eigen meester, niemands knecht. Het leven van Pieter Sjoerds Gerbrandy	Cees Fasseur	9789460033360	
2015	Netherlands	Oorlogsenthousiasme. Europa 1900-1918	Ewoud Kieft	9789023484349	
2015	Netherlands	De stamhouder. Een familiekroniek	Alexander Münninghoff	9789035142268	9789035142275
2015	Netherlands	De schaduw van de grote broer	Laura Starink	9789021400730	
2014	Netherlands	De Velser affaire	Bas von Benda-Beckmann	9789461052841	
2014	Netherlands	Willem Drees 1886-1988. De jaren 1948-1988. Premier en elder statesman	Hans Daalder en Jelle Gaemers	9789460037153	
2014	Netherlands	De woordenaar. Christoffel Plantijn, 's werelds grootste drukker en uitgever (1520-1589)	Sandra Langereis	9789460033452	
2014	Netherlands	Koning Willem III	Dik van der Meulen	9789461051868	
2014	Netherlands	Gerard Heineken	Annejet van der Zijl	9789021421667	
2013	Netherlands	De Boerenoorlog	Martin Bossenbroek	9789025302429	
2013	Netherlands	De vergelding. Een dorp in tijden van oorlog	Jan Brokken	9789045033679	
2013	Netherlands	Naar het aards paradijs. Het rusteloze leven van Jacob Roggeveen, ontdekker van Paaseiland (1659-1729)	Roelof van Gelder	9789460035739	
2013	Netherlands	1001 vrouwen uit de Nederlandse geschiedenis	Els Kloek	9789460041419	
2013	Netherlands	Wereld in woorden. Geschiedenis van de Nederlandse literatuur 1300-1400	Frits van Oostrom	9789035139398	
2012	Netherlands	Wij weten niets van hun lot. Gewone Nederlanders en de Holocaust	Bart van der Boom	9789024449446	
2012	Netherlands	Moederkerk. De ondergang van rooms Nederland	Jos Palm	9789046704929	
2012	Netherlands	De ontdekking van de Middeleeuwen. Geschiedenis van een illusie	Peter Raedts	9789028426863	
2012	Netherlands	Ferdinand Domela Nieuwenhuis. Een romantische revolutionair	Jan Willem Stutje	9789056155247	
2012	Netherlands	De man die nee zei. Charles de Gaulle, 1890-1970	Henk Wesseling	9789035136601	
2011	Netherlands	Het gevecht met Leviathan. Een verhaal over de politieke ordening in Europa, 1815-1965	Emiel Lamberts	9789035136366	
2011	Netherlands	Generaal Spoor. Triomf en tragiek van een legercommandant	Jaap de Moor	9789046704929	
2011	Netherlands	Een Nederlander in de wildernis. De ontdekkingsreizen van Robert Jacob Gordon (1743 - 1795) in Zuid-Afrika	Luc Panhuysen	9789086890668	
2011	Netherlands	Kameraad Baron. Een reis door de verdwijnende wereld van de Transsylvaanse aristocratie	Jaap Scholten	9789025438654	
2011	Netherlands	Koninkrijk vol sloppen. Achterbuurten en vuil in de negentiende eeuw	Auke van der Woud	9789044649086	
2010	Netherlands	Vrouw des Huizes. Een cultuurgeschiedenis van de Hollandse huisvrouw	Els Kloek	9789460030116	
2010	Belgium	Congo: een geschiedenis	David Van Reybrouck	9789023458661	
2010	Netherlands	De NSB. Ontstaan en opkomst van de Nationaal-Socialistische Beweging, 1931-1935	Robin te Slaa en Edwin Klijn	9789024443031	9789024445615
2010	Netherlands	Het geheim van De Telegraaf. Geschiedenis van een krant	Marriëtte Wolf	9789085067658	
2010	Netherlands	Bernhard. Een verborgen geschiedenis	Annejet van der Zijl	9789021437644	
2009	Netherlands	Juliana & Bernhard	Cees Fasseur	9789050189552	
2009	Netherlands	Rampjaar 1672. Hoe de Republiek aan de ondergang ontsnapte	Luc Panhuysen	9789045048659	
2009	Netherlands	Cornelis Kraijenhoff	Wilfried Uitterhoeve	9789460040429	
2009	Netherlands	Joke Smit	Marja Vuijsje	9789045014302	
2009	Netherlands	Weest manlijk, zijt sterk. Pim Boellaard	Jolande Withuis	9789023459422	
2008	Netherlands	Elisabeth de Flines. Een onmogelijke liefde in de achttiende eeuw	Machiel Bosman	9789025363628	
2008	Netherlands	Jaap en Ischa Meijer. Een joodse geschiedenis, 1912-1956 (Deel 1)	Evelien Gans	9789035130388	
2008	Netherlands	Het pauperparadijs. Een familiegeschiedenis	Suzanna Jansen	9789463821902	9789460038372
2008	Netherlands	Gevaarlijke kennis. Inzicht en angst in de dagen van Jan Swammerdam	Luuc Kooijmans	9789031351046	
2008	Netherlands	Jonkheer D. J. de Geer. De teloorgang van een minister-president	Henk van Osch	9789085064213	
2007	Netherlands	Orde en trouw. Over Johan Huizinga	Willem Otterspeer	9789023418320	
2007	Netherlands	Geschiedenis van Amsterdam IV	Piet de Rooy	9789058751409	
2007	Netherlands	Van alle dingen los. Het leven van J.C. Bloem	Bart Slijper	9789029510202	
2007	Netherlands	Frankrijk in oorlog	Henk Wesseling	9789035130616	
2007	Netherlands	Een nieuwe wereld	Auke van der Woud	9789035145320	

== Jury ==
The Libris History Prize jury consist of a range of regular members. The head of the jury changes on a yearly basis:

- 2023 Kathleen Ferrier
- 2022 Thom de Graaf
- 2021 Khadija Arib
- 2020 Hans de Boer
- 2019 Sybrand van Haersma Buma
- 2018 Jeroen Dijsselbloem
- 2017 Lilianne Ploumen
- 2016 Henk van Os (former director Rijksmuseum)
- 2015 Wim Pijbes
- 2014 Heleen Dupuis
- 2013 Nout Wellink
- 2012 Pieter Broertjes
- 2011 Agnes Jongerius
- 2010 Paul Schnabel
- 2009 Frits Bolkestein
- 2008 Frits van Oostrom
- 2007 Jan Marijnissen

== See also ==
- Libris Prize
