= Jenny Reynaerts =

Dutch art historian and curator (born 1960)

- Born: 1960 (age 65–66)
- Education: University of Amsterdam
- Occupations: Art historian, curator

Jenny Reynaerts (born 1960) is a Dutch art historian and was senior curator at the Rijksmuseum in Amsterdam, and previously curator of 18th- and 19th-century paintings. Known for her expertise in 18th- and 19th-century Dutch art, she has contributed to the study and presentation of this period through exhibitions, publications, and her advocacy for inclusivity in museum collections.

== Education and career ==
Reynaerts studied art history at the University of Amsterdam, where she later worked as an assistant professor in the Department of Art History from 1985 to 2003. During this time, she focused on Dutch and European art from the 18th and 19th centuries, laying the foundation for her career as a curator and researcher.

=== Rijksmuseum ===
In 2003, Reynaerts joined the Rijksmuseum as a curator of 19th- and 20th-century paintings. By 2008, she was promoted to Senior Curator of 18th- and 19th-century paintings. Her tenure at the museum has been marked by major exhibitions and projects that aim to bring historical art to contemporary audiences while addressing overlooked narratives in art history.

Reynaerts is a founding member of the European Society for Nineteenth-Century Art (ESNA), an organization dedicated to fostering international research and collaboration in the study of 19th-century European art.

In 2019, she published Mirror of Reality. 19th-Century Painting in the Netherlands, the first comprehensive survey of nineteenth-century Dutch painting to appear in seventy years. The volume was published by Rijksmuseum in collaboration with Mercatorfonds and Yale University Press.

=== Inclusivity in museum collections ===
Reynaerts has been a vocal advocate for diversity and inclusion in art history. Her projects often emphasize underrepresented artists, women artists, themes, and perspectives, contributing to broader discussions about the role of museums in shaping cultural narratives.

In 2026 she helped to establish the Judith Leyster Fund.

== Major exhibitions ==
Notable exhibitions curated by Reynaerts include:

- De ontdekking van Nederland: vier eeuwen landschap door Hollandse meesterschilders (2008): A groundbreaking exhibition exploring four centuries of Dutch landscape painting.
- Rembrandt en Degas (2011): A comparative exhibition examining the artistic parallels between Rembrandt and Edgar Degas.
- Women of the Rijksmuseum (2023–present): A research project and exhibition series aimed at achieving a better gender balance in the museum's collection and presentation.

== Publications ==
Reynaerts has an extensive body of scholarly work, focusing on 18th- and 19th-century Dutch art. Below is a selection of her major publications:

- Het karakter onzer Hollandsche school: De Koninklijke Akademie van Beeldende Kunsten te Amsterdam, 1817-1870 (2001): A detailed study of the Royal Academy of Fine Arts in Amsterdam, highlighting its role in shaping Dutch artistic traditions in the 19th century.
- De ontdekking van Nederland: vier eeuwen landschap door Hollandse meesterschilders (2008): Co-authored with Huigen Leeflang and Henk van Os, this book explores four centuries of Dutch landscape painting and its cultural significance.
- Spiegel van de werkelijkheid. 19de-eeuwse schilderkunst in Nederland (2019): A comprehensive examination of Dutch 19th-century painting, analyzing artistic movements and their broader societal contexts.
- Romanticism in the North: From Friedrich to Turner (2017): A co-authored work examining Romantic landscape painting in Northern Europe and its connections to the Dutch tradition.
- Geesje & Anna: De wereld van Breitners beroemde modellen (2024): A detailed exploration of the lives of Geesje and Anna Kwak, two prominent models for the artist George Hendrik Breitner, contextualizing their contributions to Dutch art.
- The Wall Paintings in the Rijksmuseum (2012): An article discussing the historical and artistic significance of the Rijksmuseum’s wall paintings.
- A Curious Case of Neglect: The Collection of Paintings from Baron Van Lynden and Baroness Van Pallandt (2023): A critical analysis of a neglected art collection and its implications for art historical research.

=== Select publications ===
- Reynaerts, Jenny. “La Scuola dell’Aja.” In Vincent van Gogh. Rome: Galleria Nazionale d’Arte Moderna; Mondadori Editore–De Luca Editore, 1988.
- “De club der woelingen, 1875–1914.” In J.J. Hey (ed.), Een vereeniging van ernstige kunstenaars. 150 jaar Maatschappij Arti et Amicitiae 1839–1989, 28–45. Amsterdam: Thoth, 1989.
- “Van atelier tot academie: schilders in opleiding 1850–1900.” In C. Blotkamp (ed.), Schilders van Tachtig. Nederlandse schilderkunst 1880–1895, 88–108. Amsterdam: Rijksmuseum Vincent van Gogh; Zwolle: Waanders, 1991.
- “Vereniging en vernieuwing. Kunstenaarsverenigingen in Amsterdam in het laatste kwart van de 19de eeuw.” Tijdschrift voor Sociale Geschiedenis 19 (1993), no. 1 (February), 36–51.
- “Een vriend om tegen te knokken.” In E. van Odijk, J. Reynaerts, and E. van Uitert (eds.), Er is eene RijksAkademie… Over ruimte voor kunstenaars, 28–69. Bussum: Thoth, 1995.
- “Italia and Hollandia. Conflicting Memories at Work in the Dutch Prix de Rome (1817–1851).” In W. Reinink and J. Stumpel (eds.), Memory & Oblivion. Proceedings of the XXIXth International Congress of the History of Art held in Amsterdam, 1–7 September 1996, 855–860. Dordrecht: Kluwer Publishers, 1999.
- ‘Het karakter onzer Hollandsche school’. De Koninklijke Akademie van Beeldende Kunsten te Amsterdam, 1817–1870. Leiden: Primavera Pers, 2001. (PhD diss., University of Amsterdam, 2000).
- “Schone slaapsters. Doodsportretten van vrouwen in de westerse kunst vanaf de Middeleeuwen.” In Moordmeiden en schone slaapsters. Beleving en verbeelding van vrouwen en de dood. Jaarboek voor Vrouwengeschiedenis 24, 182–196. Amsterdam: Askant, 2004.
- “Momenten uit de 19de-eeuwse schilderspraktijk.” Dordrechts Bulletin, no. 2 (2004), 17–21.
- Bergvelt, Ellinoor, J.P. Filedt Kok, Norbert Middelkoop, et al., with contributions by Jenny Reynaerts. De Hollandse meesters van een Amsterdams bankier. De verzameling Adriaan van der Hoop (1778–1854), 120–127, 129–133. Amsterdam; Zwolle: Amsterdams Historisch Museum; Rijksmuseum; Waanders, 2004.
- De koning, de schilder en de leeuw. Amsterdam: Nieuw-Amsterdam Uitgevers; Rijksmuseum-Dossier, 2006.
- Reynaerts, Jenny, and Marguerite Tuijn. “Naturalisme als uitgangspunt. Piet Mondriaan, Oostzijdse molen bij maanlicht.” Bulletin van het Rijksmuseum 54 (2006), no. 3, 246–265.
