= Congo: The Epic History of a People =

2010 book by David Van Reybrouck

- First edition (Dutch)
- Author: David Van Reybrouck
- Original title: Congo. Een geschiedenis
- Language: Dutch
- Publisher: De Bezige Bij
- Publication date: 2010
- English publication date: 2014 by HarperCollins
- Media type: Print (hardback)
- Pages: 639
- ISBN: 978-0-06-220011-2

Congo: The Epic History of a People (Dutch: Congo. Een geschiedenis) is a non-fiction book by David Van Reybrouck, first published in 2010. It describes the history of the Democratic Republic of the Congo from the prehistory until the present, with the main focus on the period from the Belgian colonisation until the book's release. The book was originally published by De Bezige Bij on 3 May 2010. By the end of 2012 it had sold over 300,000 copies in Dutch. Its English version was translated by Sam Garrett.

== Content ==
Van Reybrouck recounts the history of the Democratic Republic of Congo from the early slave trade, to the time of European exploration and colonization under the Congo Free State and Belgian Congo, independence, the Congo Crisis, Mobutu's dictatorship, and two civil wars, and the time after when the country and its citizens are adjusting to a new role in a globalized world. The book is the result of six years of research, and the author conducted 10 trips to Congo and had over 500 interviews with Congolese citizens, both notable figures and ordinary people. Van Reybrouck explores the vibrant contemporary Congolese community in Guangzhou where several thousand traders ship containers to their homeland full of merchandise. In the end the author challenges the cliché that the country is just a place of natural riches that have helped the world economy and that "its own history (is) merely a domestic matter, richly permeated with dreams and shadows." He notes that the rubber exploitation gave rise to "one of history's first major humanitarian campaigns", Congolese soldiers contributed to crucial victories in Africa in both World Wars, the Cold War in Africa started in Congo, as did the first major UN intervention, and that the civil wars "prompted the biggest and most costly peacekeeping mission ever."

Among the people Van Reybrouck interviewed was Étienne Nkasi, who lived in a shack in Kinshasa. "His glasses were attached to his head with a rubber band. Behind the thick and badly scratched lenses I made out a pair of watery eyes." Nkasi told him that he was born in 1882. Van Reybrouck checked if it would be possible that he was 126 years old and found that he knew the names of missionaries of those days and personally knew Simon Kimbangu, who was younger and born in a nearby village. Nkasi died in 2010 at the age of possibly 128.

== Reception ==
Stephen W. Smith (The Guardian) noted that the general critical consensus is that the book "reads like a novel" while being "as rigorous as an academic history." He applauds the author for making Congo's history "readable" for us. Nicholas van de Walle (Foreign Affairs) found the work "carefully researched" and liked the "compelling portraits of ordinary people." Chris Hartman (The Christian Science Monitor) believes that the book would have benefited from some examination of the AIDS crisis, but indicates that Van Reybrouck "has woven a narrative that stands admirably among some recent works on the ravages of colonial occupations..." J.M. Legard of The New York Times describes the book as "a magnificent account, intimately researched, and relevant for anyone interested in how the recent past may inform our future."

== Translations ==
- English: Congo: The Epic History of a People, HarperCollins, 2014. ISBN 9780062200112
- French: Congo, une histoire, Actes Sud, 2012
- German: Kongo. Eine Geschichte, Suhrkamp Verlag, 2012
- Norwegian: Kongo. Historien om Afrikas hjerte, Font Forlag
- Swedish: Kongo: en historia, Natur & Kultur
- Danish: Congo, Historien om Afrikas hjerte, translation Birthe Lundsgaard, Tiderne skifter, 2012
- Italian: Congo, translation Franco Paris, Feltrinelli Editore, 2014
- Polish: Kongo. Opowieść o zrujnowanym kraju, translation Jadwiga Jędryas, WAB, 2016
- Chinese: 刚果：一个民族的史诗, translation Wang Xingdong, Huazhong University of Science & Technology Press, 2019

== Awards ==
- 2010: AKO Literatuurprijs (Netherlands and Flanders)
- 2010: Libris History Prize (Netherlands and Flanders)
- 2012: Prix Médicis essai (France)
- 2012: Prix du Meilleur Livre Étranger (France)
- 2012: NDR Kultur Sachbuchpreis (Germany)
- 2013: Prix Aujourd'hui (France)
- 2014: one of the six nominees and one of the three finalists for the Cundill Prize

== See also ==
- King Leopold's Ghost: A Story of Greed, Terror, and Heroism in Colonial Africa (1998) is a best-selling popular history book by Adam Hochschild
