= Johannes Fabian =

German anthropologist (1937–2026)

Johannes Fabian (19 May 1937 – 6 January 2026) was a German anthropologist who was professor of anthropology at the University of Amsterdam. His ethnographic and historical research focuses on religious movements, language, work, and popular culture in the Shaba mining region of Zaire (present-day Democratic Republic of the Congo). His theoretical and critical work addresses questions of epistemology and history in anthropology, notably the influential book Time and the Other (1983), which has become a classic in the field of anthropology.

== Life and career ==
Johannes Fabian was born on 19 May 1937 in the German town of Glogau (now in Poland). He began his university studies in Bonn in 1956, and then moved on St. Gabriel Mission House in Mödling, Austria to study theology. His experiences in Austria led him to study anthropology in Munich, before undertaking a master's degree (1965) and PhD (1969) at the University of Chicago. After receiving his PhD, he took up appointments at a series of universities: in 1968 at Northwestern University in Evanston, Illinois; in 1973 at the University of Zaire; in 1974 at Wesleyan University in Middletown, Connecticut; and finally moved to the University of Amsterdam in 1980, where he was a professor and chair of the department of cultural anthropology until his retirement in 2002. During this time he had visiting appointments in Bonn, Cologne, and Paris.

His ethnographic research focused on religious movements in Zaire and Congo. Fabian is most famous for his book Time and the Other: How Anthropology Makes its Object (1983), a classic in the field of anthropology that had changed the way that anthropologists think about their relationship with the people they study and is an important work of postcolonial critique within anthropology. As the blurbs on the book put it, the book is "a radical epistemological critique of anthropological writing" (George Marcus, University of California, Irvine) and "Time and the Other is a critique of the notions that anthropologists are 'here and now,' their objects of study are 'there and then,' and that the 'other' exists in a time not contemporary with our own." His 1996 work, Remembering the Present: Paintings and popular history in Zaire was made in collaboration with the Congolese artist Tshibumba Kanda-Matulu.

Fabian died on 6 January 2026, at the age of 88.

== Writings ==
- !Kung bushman kinship : Componential analysis and alternative interpretations (1965)
- Genres in an emerging tradition: An anthropological approach to religious communication (1974)
- Scratching the surface: Observations on the poetics of lexical borrowing in Shaba Swahili (1982)
- Swahili on the road: Notes on language in two nineteenth century travelogues (1983)
- Time and the Other: How anthropology makes its object (1983)
- Power and performance: Ethnographic explorations through proverbial wisdom and theater in Shaba, Zaire (1990)
- Remembering the Present: Painting and Popular History in Zaire (1996)
- Memory against culture: Arguments and Reminders (2007)
- Ethnography as commentary: writing from the virtual archive (2008)
