= Frits van Oostrom =

Dutch academic (born 1953)

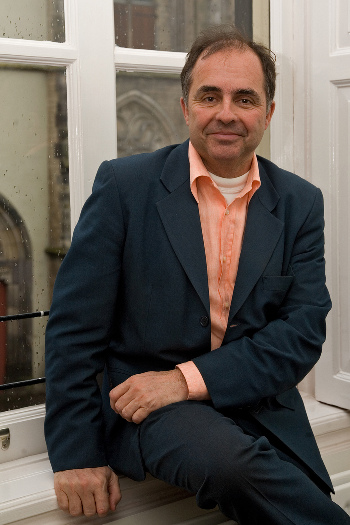
- Van Oostrom (2009)
- Born: 15 May 1953 (age 73)
- Education: University Utrecht
- Awards: Prince Bernhard Fund prize for science research (1982); Spinoza Prize (1995); AKO Literature Prize (1996); Fleerackers Prize (1999); Emperor Charlemagne Prize (2000); Libris History Prize
- Scientific career
- Workplaces: Leiden University; University Utrecht; Harvard University

Frits van Oostrom (born 15 May 1953 in Utrecht, Netherlands) is university professor for the Humanities at Utrecht University. In 1999 he was a visiting professor at Harvard for the Erasmus Chair. From September 2004 to June 2005, he was a fellow of the Netherlands Institute for Advanced Study (NIAS). He was awarded the Spinozapremie in 1995. In May 2005 he became president of the Royal Netherlands Academy of Arts and Sciences (KNAW) for a three-year period. He had been member of the same institution since 1994.

In the later years Van Oostrom was given the task to assemble a Canon of the Netherlands, meaning: what everyone should know of the Netherlands and its history.
