= Gerda Blees =

Dutch writer

- Born: 1985 (age 40–41)
- Education: Gerrit Rietveld Academie
- Writing career
- Language: Dutch
- Genres: Novel; short story; poem
- Notable awards: EU Prize for Literature; 2021 Wij zijn licht

Gerda Blees (born 1985) is a Dutch writer. She published her first book in 2017, a short story collection titled Aan doodgaan dachten we niet (We Didn't Think About Dying). In 2018, she published her first volume of poetry, Dwaallichten (Wandering Lights).

She studied fine arts at the Gerrit Rietveld Academie in Amsterdam, and now lives in Haarlem.

Blees won the European Union Prize for Literature in 2021 for her debut novel Wij zijn licht (We Are Light). The novel – translated into English by Michele Hutchison – was also shortlisted for the 2025 International Dublin Literary Award.
