= Michele Hutchison =

British writer and translator

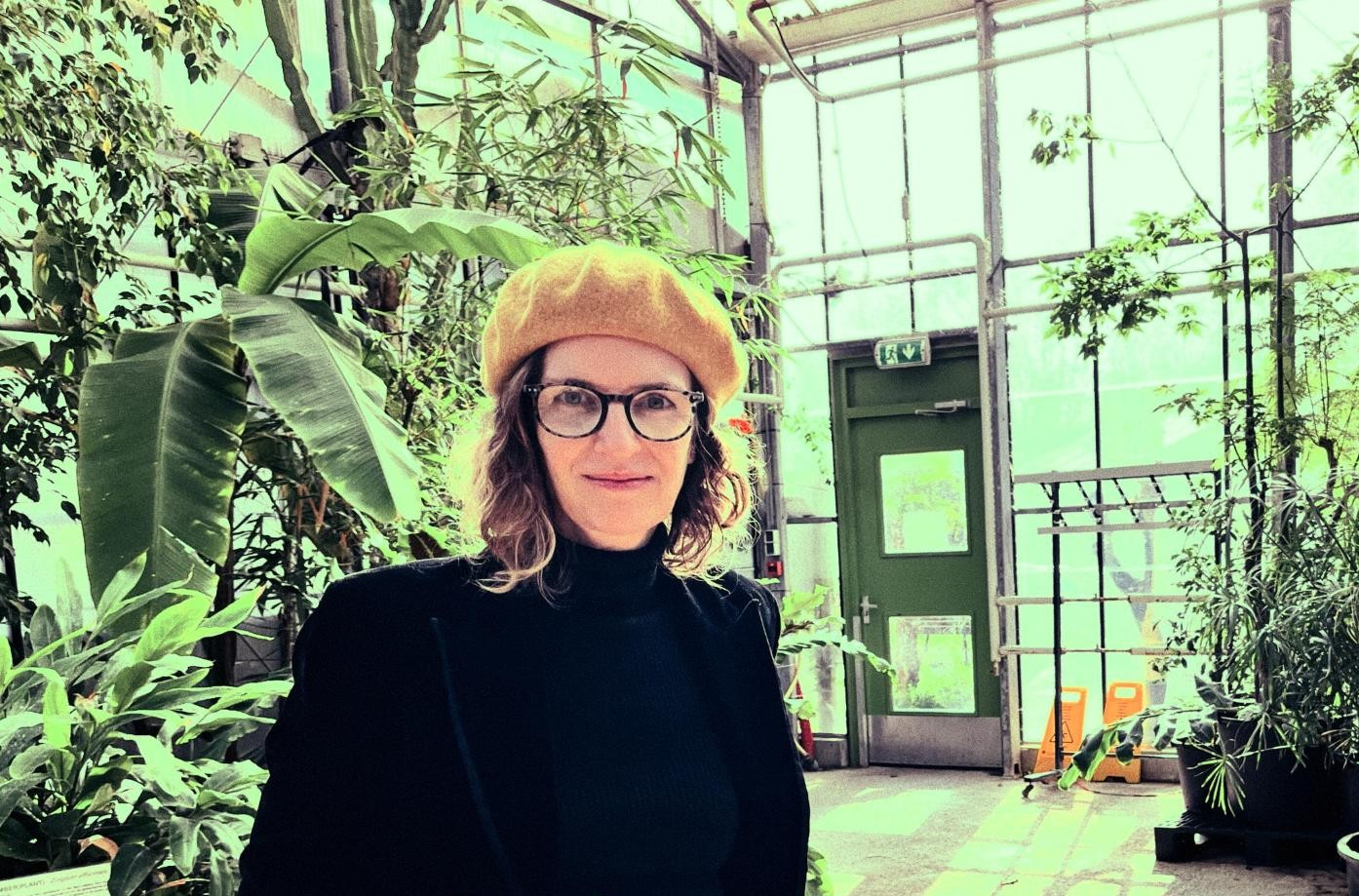
- Occupation: Writer, editor, translator
- Notable works: The Discomfort of Evening English translation of the Dutch novel by Lucas Rijneveld
- Notable awards: International Booker Prize

Michele Hutchison (born 1972) is a British writer and translator, mainly of Dutch-language literature. She won the 2020 International Booker Prize for her translation of The Discomfort of Evening by Lucas Rijneveld, which according to the Booker website her "striking translation captures in all its wild, violent beauty." She was also awarded the Vondel Prize 2019 for her translation of Stage Four by Sander Kollaard. Her translation of Barbara Stok's The Philosopher, The Dog and The Wedding won the inaugural Sophie Castille Award for graphic novel translations in 2023. In 2025, she shared the James Tait Black Memorial Prize for fiction with Lucas Rijneveld for My Heavenly Favourite and her translation of We Are Light by Gerda Blees was shortlisted for the Dublin Literary Award.

== Biography ==
Hutchison was born in the United Kingdom and educated at the University of East Anglia, University of Cambridge, and University of Lyon. A former commissioning editor at various publishing houses, she has translated more than forty books from Dutch and three from French. Her translations include poetry, graphic novels, children’s books, short stories, literary non-fiction and novels by Lucas Rijneveld, Ilja Leonard Pfeijffer, Esther Gerritsen, Sander Kollaard, Pierre Bayard, and Sasja Janssen. She moved to Amsterdam in 2004 and now lives in Haarlem.

She is the co-author (with Rina Mae Acosta) of the parenting book The Happiest Kids in the World: What We Can Learn from Dutch Parents.

== Selection of translated titles ==
- Lucas Rijneveld: The Discomfort of Evening, My Heavenly Favourite
- Annejet van der Zijl: An American Princess
- Ilja Leonard Pfeijffer: La Superba, Rupert: A Confession, Grand Hotel Europa
- Joris Luyendijk: People Like Us: The Truth About Reporting the Middle East
- Brecht Evens: The Making Of, The Wrong Place, and Panther (graphic novels, with Laura Watkinson)
- Simone van der Vlugt: Safe as Houses, The Reunion, and Shadow Sister
- Tom Lanoye: Fortunate Slaves
- Pierre Bayard: How to Talk About Places You’ve Never Been
- Angelo Tijssens: The Edges
- Anna Woltz: Under the London Sky
- Gerrit Kouwenaar: Fall, Bomb, Fall
- Octavie Wolters: The Starling's Song, This Will Last Forever
- Valentijn Hoogenkamp: Antiboy
- Gerda Blees: We Are Light
- translations and articles in journals and anthologies including Words Without Borders, The High Window, The Loch Raven Review, The Enchanted Verses, The Penguin Book of Dutch Short Stories, and Swallows and Floating Horses
