= Henk van Os =

Dutch art historian (1938–2025)

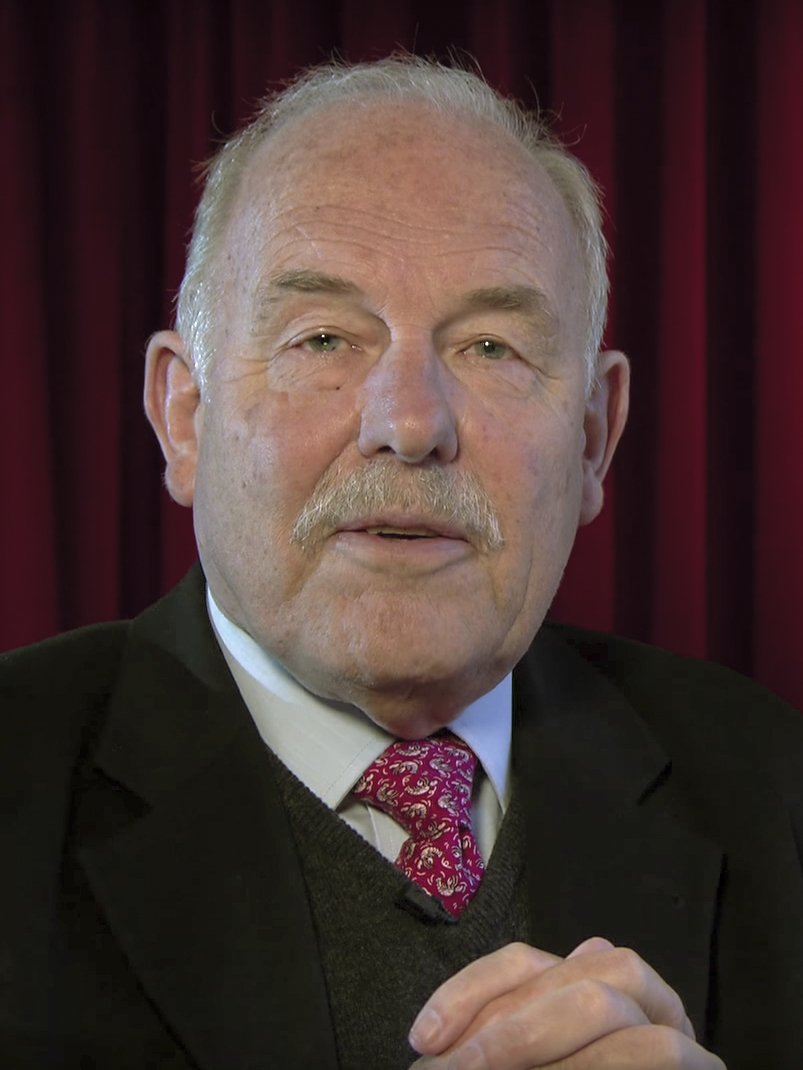
- Van Os in 2014
- Born: Hendrik Willem van Os; 28 February 1938; Harderwijk, Netherlands
- Died: 14 June 2025 (aged 87); Amsterdam, Netherlands
- Occupation: Art historian
- Known for: Director of the Rijksmuseum, TV presenter

Academic background
- Education: University of Groningen

Academic work
- Discipline: Art history
- Institutions: University of Amsterdam

Lecture by Henk van Os about the importance of The Night Watch

Hendrik Willem van Os (28 February 1938 – 14 June 2025) was a Dutch art historian. He served as professor of Art and Cultural History, director of the Rijksmuseum in Amsterdam, and presenter of television programs on art.

== Life and career ==
Henk van Os studied art history at the University of Groningen, where his father, Frederik van Os, served as rector magnificus during two terms. He also spent time studying in Rome. In 1969, he earned his doctorate in Groningen and became professor of Art and Cultural History there in 1974. Between 1984 and 1989, he was also dean of the Faculty of Arts. From 1989 to 1996, he served as director of the Rijksmuseum Amsterdam, after which he became university professor of Art and Society at the University of Amsterdam.

Van Os became widely known to the public through his presentation of TV programs such as Beeldenstorm (AVRO) and Museumschatten (VARA), which aimed to popularize art, especially painting.

He also organized major exhibitions outside of the Rijksmuseum, including at the Groninger Museum: Ilja Repin, The Secret of Russia (2001–2002); the Mauritshuis in The Hague: Dream of Italy (2006); Nieuwe Kerk in Amsterdam and Museum Catharijneconvent in Utrecht: On the Way to Heaven (2000/2001) and Franciscus (2016).

In 2012, a book was published containing letters between Van Os and his son Pieter, discussing Van Os' religious motivations.

He received numerous national and international honors, including the rare Medal for Arts and Science of the House Order of Orange.

Van Os died in Amsterdam on 14 June 2025, at the age of 87.

== Selected publications ==
- With Wim Hazeu, The Joys of Art History. Baarn, De Prom, 1993
- The Road to Heaven: Relic Worship in the Middle Ages. Baarn, De Prom, 2000
- Dutch Art in the Rijksmuseum, Vol. 1, 1400–1600. Zwolle, Waanders, 2000
- Iconoclasm: Selected. Amsterdam University Press Salomé, 2002
- Seeing Is Enough. Amsterdam, Balans, 2003 / 2005
- Motherland History, 2005
- (with contributions by Epco Runia), Dream of Italy. The Hague, Mauritshuis / Zwolle, Waanders, 2006
- Augustine on the Beach. Amsterdam, Balans, 2008
- The Discovery of the Netherlands: Four Centuries of Landscape Depicted by Dutch Masters. Nai Publishers, 2008
- Young in Groningen: Art from the Period 1945–1975. Groninger Museum, 2009
- Pioneers of Modern Art, in: exhibition catalog Matisse to Malevich: Pioneers of Modern Art from the Hermitage, Hermitage Amsterdam, 2010, pp. 13–19 (guest curator: Henk van Os)
- Just Look. Balans, 2nd edition, 2012
- Art Is Life, Life Is Art, in: Ernst Ludwig Kirchner. Paradise in the Mountains, Bussum, Uitgeverij Thoth / Singer Laren, 2015
- Sacred and Profane Families. Balans, 2015
- Artful: Collected Columns. Rembrandt Association, 2017
