= Lucas Rijneveld =

Dutch poet and writer

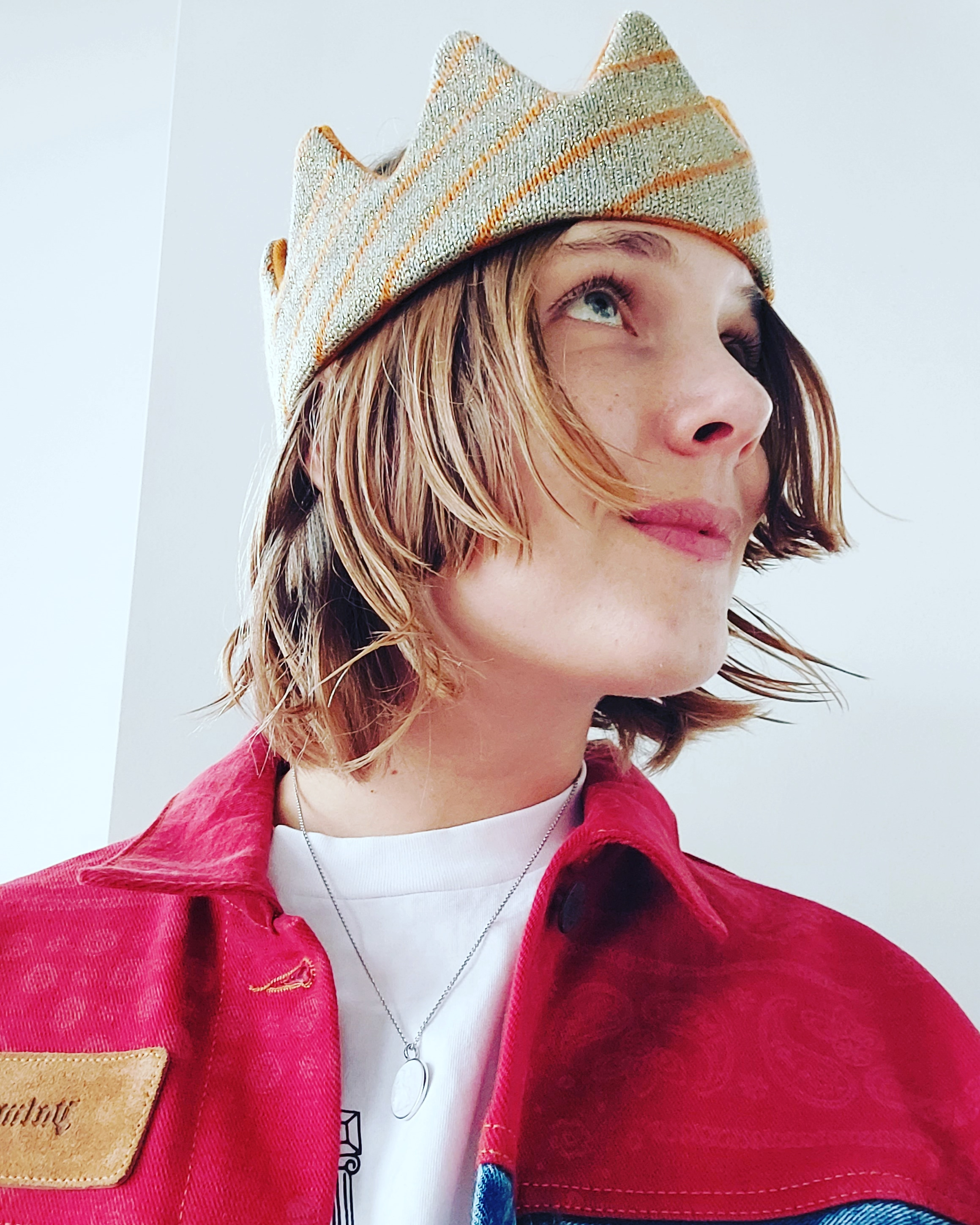
- Rijneveld in 2022
- Born: 20 April 1991 (age 35); Nieuwendijk, Netherlands
- Occupations: Writer, poet
- Writing career
- Years active: 2015–present
- Genres: Novels, verse
- Notable work: The Discomfort of Evening
- Notable awards: International Booker Prize (2020)
- Website: lucasrijneveld.com

Lucas Rijneveld (formerly Marieke Lucas Rijneveld; born 20 April 1991) is a Dutch writer. Rijneveld won the 2020 International Booker Prize together with his translator Michele Hutchison for his debut novel The Discomfort of Evening. Rijneveld was the first Dutch author to win the prize and the first non-binary person to do so.

== Life ==
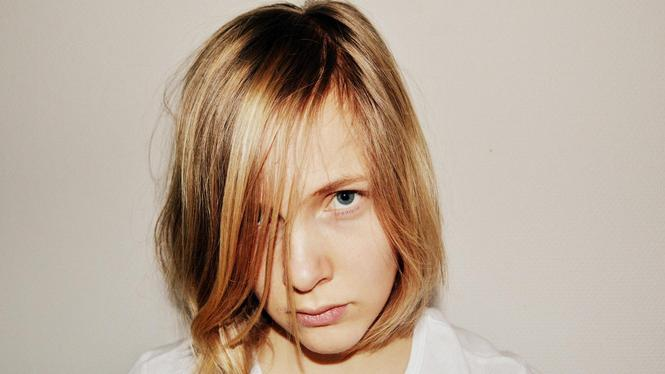
Lucas Rijneveld (2015)

Rijneveld grew up in a Reformed protestant family on a farm in North Brabant, Netherlands. Rijneveld has said that his debut novel, translated into English as The Discomfort of Evening, is inspired partly by the death of his brother when the author was three. It took him six years to complete the novel.

Rijneveld is said to have developed an interest in writing in primary school after reading J. K. Rowling's Harry Potter and the Philosopher's Stone, which he borrowed from the local library. Because in Reformed circles references to magic are considered taboo, Rijneveld copied out the whole book onto his computer so he could re-read it upon returning the novel. Rijneveld identifies as both male and female, and adopted the second first name Lucas at the age of nineteen, having been bullied in secondary school because of his "boyish appearance and nature".

His name as a child was only Marieke, and he previously published under the name Marieke Lucas. At the start of January 2022, Rijneveld announced that he uses he/him personal pronouns in English, having previously used they/them pronouns, and zij/haar (she/her) in Dutch.

Rijneveld said Jan Wolkers, who also grew up in a Reformed environment, is his idol. His interest in poetry was ignited while attending speech therapy sessions and looking at pictures with poetry on them while waiting for the therapy session. When Rijneveld started making progress in therapy, he was allowed to read those poems by the therapist.

Rijneveld studied to become a Dutch teacher, but dropped out to focus on writing. He published the poetry collection Kalfsvlies in 2015, and that same year was named the most promising new Dutch writer. He made his national and international breakthrough with his debut novel, The Discomfort of Evening, whose English translation received positive reviews and won the International Booker Prize in 2020. A second book of poetry followed in 2019 and a second novel, Mijn lieve gunsteling, in 2020.

Rijneveld served on the editorial team of de Revisor, a Dutch literary periodical, in 2016.

In 2021, Rijneveld was selected by American poet Amanda Gorman to translate her work into Dutch. Rijneveld initially accepted the commission, but later withdrew after Dutch journalist and cultural activist Janice Deul criticised the publisher for commissioning a white translator for the work of a black poet.

== Works ==
=== Poetry collections ===
- Kalfsvlies, 2015 (English: Calf's caul, excerpts from which were translated into English by Sarah Timmer Harvey and shortlisted for Asymptote magazine's "Close Approximations" translation contest in 2017).
- Fantoommerrie, 2019 (English: Phantom Mare)
- Komijnsplitsers, 2022 (English: Hairsplitters, quibblers (literally: cumin splitters))

=== Novels ===
- De avond is ongemak (2018). The Discomfort of Evening, translated by Michele Hutchison (Faber & Faber) ISBN 9780571349364.
- Mijn lieve gunsteling (2020). My Heavenly Favourite, trans. Michele Hutchison (2024)

=== Essays ===
- Het warmtefort, 2022 (CPNB Book Week) (English: The warmth fortress)

== Awards ==
- Kalfsvlies, awarded the C. Buddingh’ Prize for best Dutch-language poetry debut in 2015.
- De avond is ongemak, awarded the ANV Debutantenprijs, the prize for best debut novel in Dutch, in 2019.
- Co-winner, with translator Michele Hutchison, of the 2020 International Booker Prize for The Discomfort of Evening.
- Mijn lieve gunsteling, awarded de Boon, fiction and non-fiction category, 2022
- Co-winner, with translator Michele Hutchison, of the 2024 James Tait Black Memorial Prize for My Heavenly Favourite.
- My Heavenly Favourite, longlisted, International Dublin Literary Award, 2025
