= Revolusi =

2020 historical book by David van Reybrouck

Revolusi: Indonesia and the Birth of the Modern World (Dutch: Revolusi: Indonesië en het ontstaan van de moderne wereld) is a 2020 historical non-fiction book by David Van Reybrouck. It covers the history of Indonesia from prehistory, the Dutch colonial period, the Indonesian National Revolution to the modern era, utilising interviews with ordinary people that van Reybrouck conducted. It was first published in Dutch in 2020 and in English in 2024 by The Bodley Head in a translation by David Colmer and David McKay. It was a bestseller when it was first published in the Netherlands.

The English translation was shortlisted for both the 2024 Cundill History Prize and the 2024 Baillie Gifford Prize.
