= Nieuwendijk =

- Village
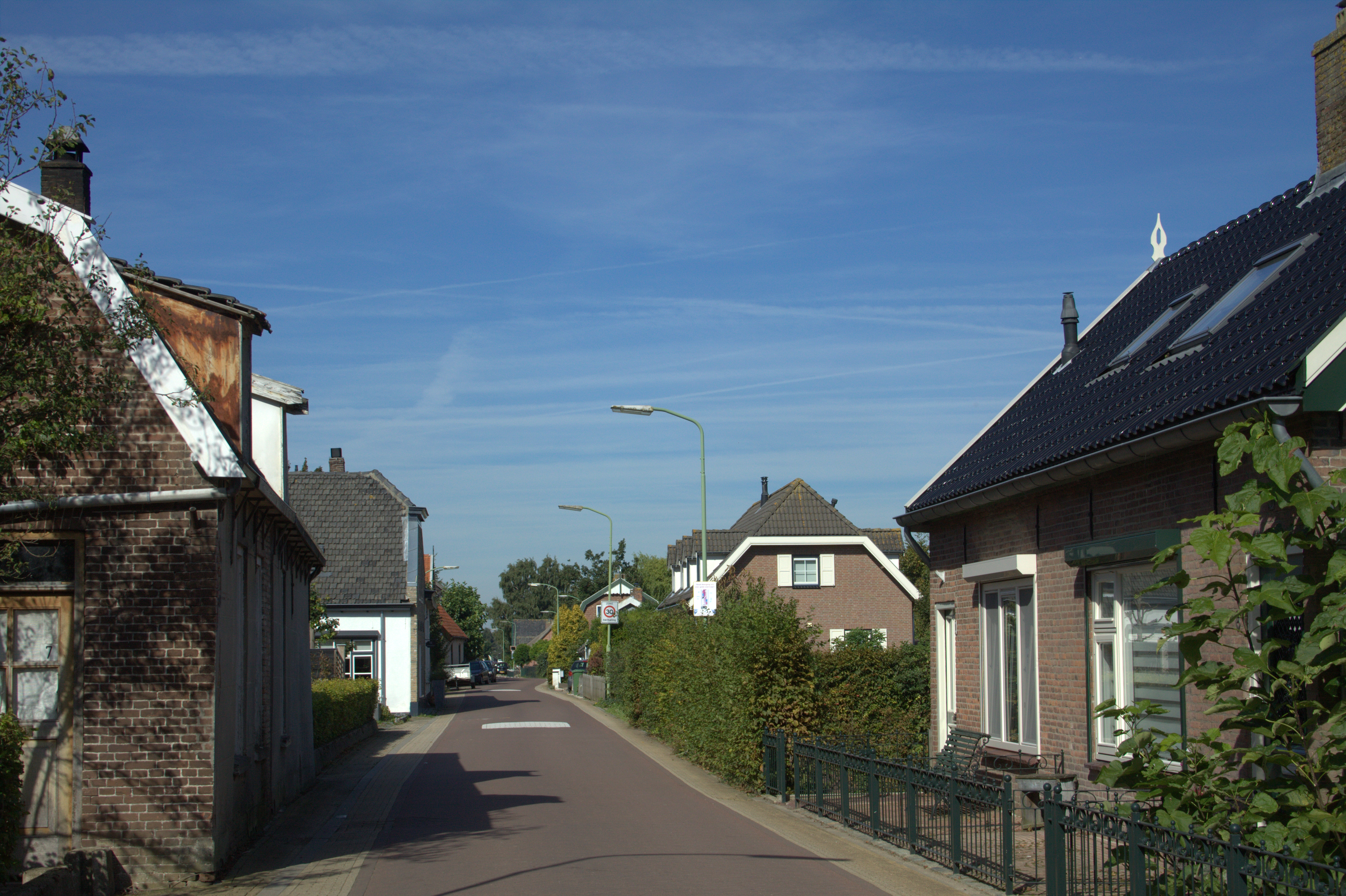
- Village street

- Location in the province of North Brabant in the Netherlands Nieuwendijk (Netherlands)
- Coordinates: 51°46′14″N 4°55′20″E
- Country: Netherlands
- Province: North Brabant
- Municipality: Altena

Area
  - Total: 10.13 km^{2} (3.91 sq mi)
- Elevation: −0.2 m (−0.66 ft)

Population (2021)
  - Total: 3,660
  - Density: 361/km^{2} (936/sq mi)
- Time zone: UTC+1 (CET)
  - Summer (DST): UTC+2 (CEST)
- Postal code: 4255
- Dialing code: 0183
- Website: nieuwendijksijt.nl

Nieuwendijk is a village in the Dutch province of North Brabant. It is a part of the municipality of Altena, and lies about 8 km south of Gorinchem.

== History ==
The village was first mentioned in 1468 as Nyewendijck, and means "new dike". Nieuw (new) has been added to distinguish from Oudendijk. Nieuwendijk was a village of dike workers and reed cutters, and could originally be reached only by water.

Nieuwendijk was home to 219 people in 1840. In 1970, the Haringvliet was closed off and the reeds disappeared.

== Notable people ==
Marieke Lucas Rijneveld, poet, novelist, and co-winner of the 2020 International Booker Prize, grew up by the River Bakkerskil in Nieuwendijk.

== Gallery ==
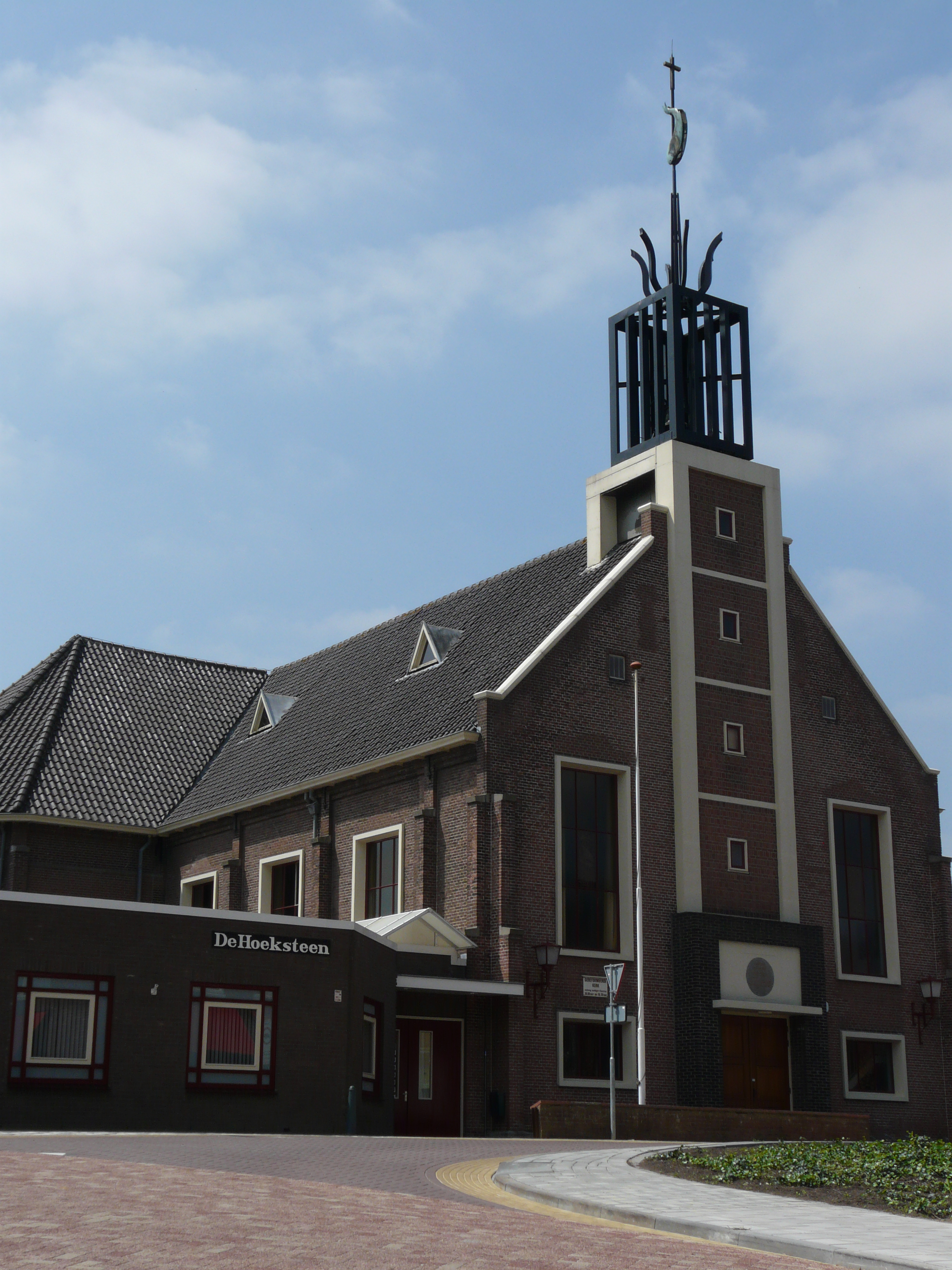
Reformed church

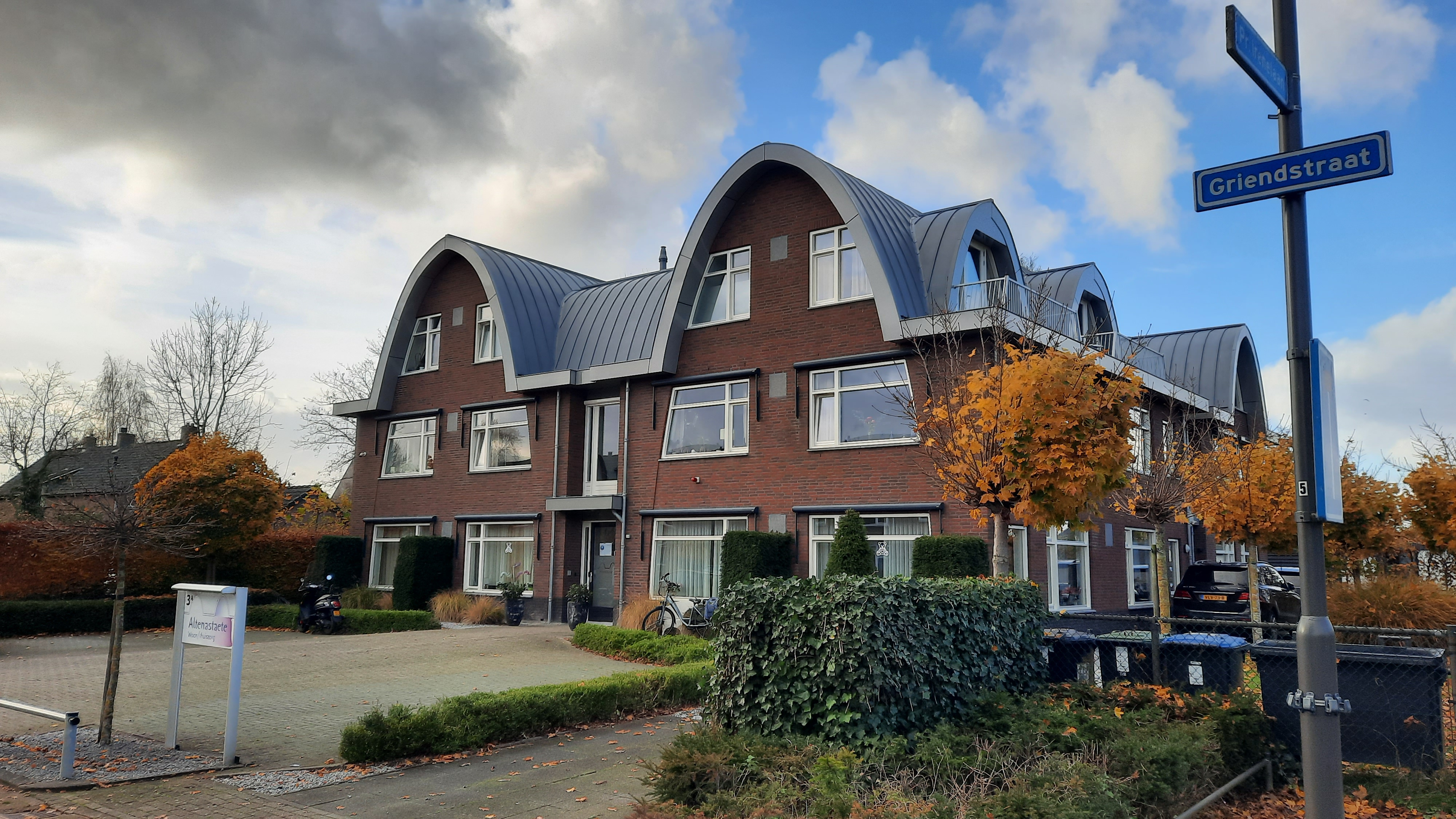
Altena Staete

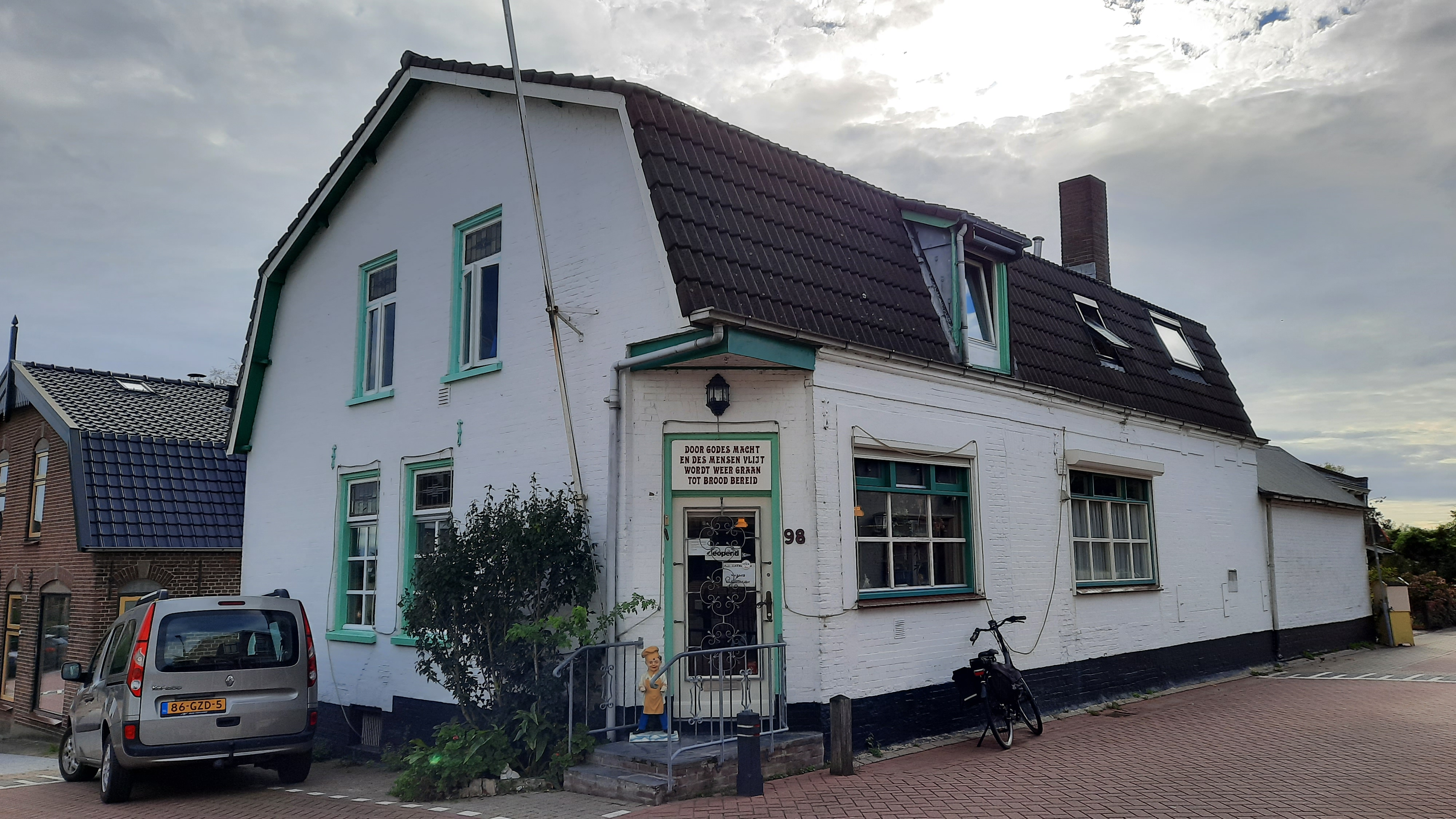
Bakery

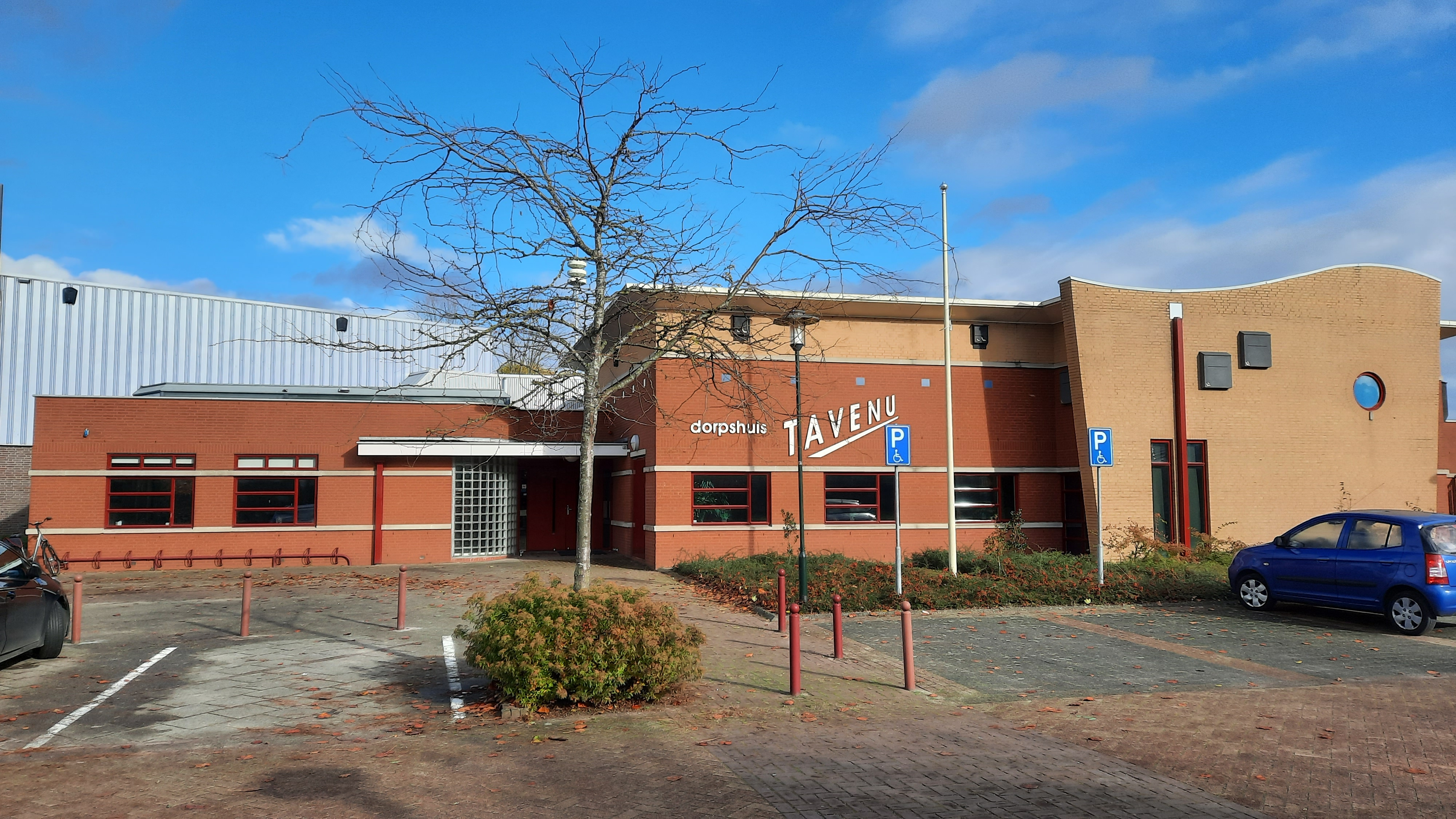
Village house Tavenu
