= Tshibumba Kanda-Matulu =

Zairian artist and painter

- Born: 1947; Élisabethville, Belgian Congo (now Lubumbashi, DR Congo)
- Died: 1981; Zaire (now Democratic Republic of the Congo)
- Known for: Painting
- Notable work: Remembering the Present (painting series and book collaboration)
- Movement: African popular art, Genre painting

Tshibumba Kanda-Matulu (1947 in Élisabethville, Belgian Congo – c.1981 in Zaire), commonly abbreviated to TKM, was a noted artist and painter from Zaire (the modern-day Democratic Republic of the Congo). TKM worked within the style termed "African popular art" or "genre painting" and is known for his prolific paintings depicting key moments of Congolese history as they appeared in folk memory. TKM disappeared in 1981 and is believed to have been killed in rioting.

== Life and work ==
Kanda-Matulu was born in Élisabethville (modern-day Lubumbashi), in the south of the Belgian Congo, in 1947. Kanda-Matulu worked within the period of cultural authenticité in the 1970s. Kanda-Matulu was one of the leading figures of "African genre painting" which had emerged in the Belgian Congo in the late 1950s and which integrated both European and Congolese styles and techniques.

Kanda-Matulu's best-known paintings form part of a series of 101 works commissioned by the German anthropologist Johannes Fabian to illustrate Congolese history as it appeared in national collective memory. The series was produced between 1974 and 1976 and forms the body of Kanda-Matulu's work and was used as the basis for an academic collaboration between the two. The result, Remembering the Present: Paintings and popular history in Zaire, was published in 1996. Kanda-Matulu viewed the purpose of the book as presenting the history of his country to a child born in the country. by contrast, Fabian presents it as an anthropological work for Western study.

Among the scenes depicted by Kanda-Matulu was the Elisabethville Massacre of 1941, Patrice Lumumba's independence speech of 30 June 1960, the introduction of culture obligatoire farming, and the trial of the religious leader Simon Kimbangu by the Belgian colonial authorities in 1921. All the paintings were made at the time of the Shaba Invasions during which Kanda-Matulu's native province of Shaba witnessed widespread political instability.

The work is historically significant because of the interviews between Fabian and Kanda-Matulu included in the work. In those interviews, Kanda-Matulu subtly critiques the government of Mobutu Sese Seko, making statements such as "What Mobutu has in mind is true - or else it is a lie. But that's something I keep to myself. What is true is that he started out with ideas that were correct. So he spoke and we all agreed; not a single thing was disputed."

The work also emphasizes Kanda-Matulu's admiration of Patrice Lumumba, particularly in the use of deliberate Christ imagery in the paintings of Lumumba, specifically mirroring Jesus' wounds after the crucifixion. The parallel is so clear that Fabian names the section "The Passion of Patrice Lumumba," a reference to "The Passion of the Christ."

102 of Kanda-Matulu's paintings were purchased by the Tropenmuseum, an ethnographic museum in Amsterdam, in 2000.

== Bibliography ==
- De Bok, Marrigje (June 2004). "Congo in Cartoons in the Tropenmuseum". The Power of Culture.
- Rattemeyer, Christian. "Painting history, making history: The Congo as a history painting". Culture Base. Swedish Institute.
