= The Discomfort of Evening =

2018 novel by Lucas Rijneveld

- First edition cover
- Author: Lucas Rijneveld
- Original title: De avond is ongemak
- Translator: Michele Hutchison
- Language: Dutch
- Set in: Netherlands
- Publisher: Atlas Contact
- Publication date: 31 January 2018
- Publication place: Amsterdam
- English publication date: 5 March 2020
- Media type: Print (hardback and softback), e-book, audio
- Pages: 271
- Awards: International Booker Prize (2020)
- ISBN: 978-90-254-4411-2 (First edition softback)
- LC Class: PT5882.28.I49 A96 2018

The Discomfort of Evening (Dutch: De avond is ongemak) is the debut novel by Dutch writer Lucas Rijneveld, published in 2018. On 26 August 2020, Rijneveld became the first Dutch writer to win the £50,000 International Booker Prize, shared jointly with the novel's English translator Michele Hutchison.

== Summary ==
The Discomfort of Evening concerns the life of ten-year old Jas, a Dutch girl who lives with her Reformed family on a dairy farm in the Netherlands. Jas is grieving the death of her brother Matthies, who died in an ice skating accident. His death drives further instability in the family and deteriorates Jas' mental health.

According to Rijneveld, the book's themes are thematically influenced by the work of Jan Wolkers.

== Background ==
The novel became a bestseller upon its release in the Netherlands. It has been the subject of controversy due to its graphic depictions of animal abuse and adolescent sexuality. It was first published on 31 January 2018 by Atlas Contact in the Netherlands. It was translated into English by Michele Hutchison and first published on 5 March 2020 as The Discomfort of Evening by Faber and Faber in the United Kingdom (ISBN 978-0-571-34936-4). Hutchison's translation was later published in the United States by Graywolf Press on 18 August 2020 (ISBN 978-1-64445-034-5).

== Reception ==
In its starred review, Kirkus Reviews wrote, "Rijneveld's extraordinary narrator describes a small world of pain which is hard to look at and harder to ignore." Publishers Weekly wrote, "Like a scene in a Bosch painting, the macabre material is loaded with sexual transgressions, pedophilia, animal torture, and abuse. The onslaught can be numbing, but the translation's soaring lyricism offers mercy for the reader."
