= Pieter van Os (journalist) =

Dutch writer and journalist

Pieter van Os (born February 8, 1971) is a Dutch writer and journalist. His published works include non-fiction books on a wide variety of subjects, including religion, war, political journalism, art and football. In 2020, he won the Brusse Prize for best journalistic book in the Dutch language with Liever dier dan mens, a book translated into English as: Hiding in Plain Sight: How a Jewish girl survived Europe’s heart of darkness. For the same book, Van Os won the prestigious Dutch Libris History Prize. Liever dier dan mens is the only book ever to have been awarded both prizes.

== Life and education ==
Pieter van Os grew up in Groningen and studied the history of political thought in Minneapolis, Leiden and Barcelona. In the nineties he was contributing editor of the weekly De Groene Amsterdammer, serving as its US-correspondent for this weekly, based in Washington DC. In those years he wrote the book Johan Cruyff: The American Years, about the most famous Dutch football star.

In 2008, he became a political reporter for the leading Dutch daily newspaper, NRC. His experiences as a political reporter led him to write a book on the complicated love-hate-relationship between press and politics, Wij begrijpen elkaar uitstekend (Meaning: We Understand Each Other Perfectly).

In 2012, together with his father, the art historian and museum director Henk van Os he published a volume of letters on religion, entitled Vader & zoon krijgen de geest (Father and son receive the Spirit).

In 2014 he moved to Poland to be with his wife Guusje Korthals Altes (born 1972), a Dutch diplomat. In Poland, Van Os wrote his acclaimed Liever dier dan mens. A critic of Dutch Daily De Volkskrant wrote about the book:

In almost every sentence, van Os compels admiration with his elegant prose, demonstrating his erudition but never showing off or taking away from the gravity of the subject matter … Hiding in Plain Sight is more than a survival narrative. It is a history of Eastern European mentality.

== Bibliography ==
- Kunst en Kapsones, De Kunstfabriek, Amsterdam ISBN 9090189378 (2005)
- Nederland op scherp. Buitenlandse beschouwingen over een stuurloos land, Prometheus/Bert Bakker, Amsterdam ISBN 9035127994 (2005)
- With Friso van der Oord, Johan Cruijff. De Amerikaanse jaren, 521Uitgevers, Amsterdam ISBN 978-9049970383 (2007)
- With Henk van Os, Vader & zoon krijgen de geest. Brieven over de drang naar godsdienst, Balans, Amsterdam ISBN 978-9460034046 (2012) (Translated into English, see ISBN 978-1467591768)
- Wij begrijpen elkaar uitstekend. De permanente wurggreep van pers en politiek, Prometheus/Bert Bakker, Amsterdam ISBN 978-9035138919 (2013)
- Liever dier dan mens. Een overlevingsverhaal, Prometheus, Amsterdam ISBN 9789044636703 (2019). (Translated by David Doherty into English as Hiding in Plain Sight, Scribe, Melbourne / London ISBN 9781957363042 (2023)
- Tussen kunst en cash. Hoe geld de Nederlandse kunstwereld corrumpeert, Das Mag, Amsterdam ISBN 9789493168831 (2021)
