= David Van Reybrouck =

Belgian cultural historian

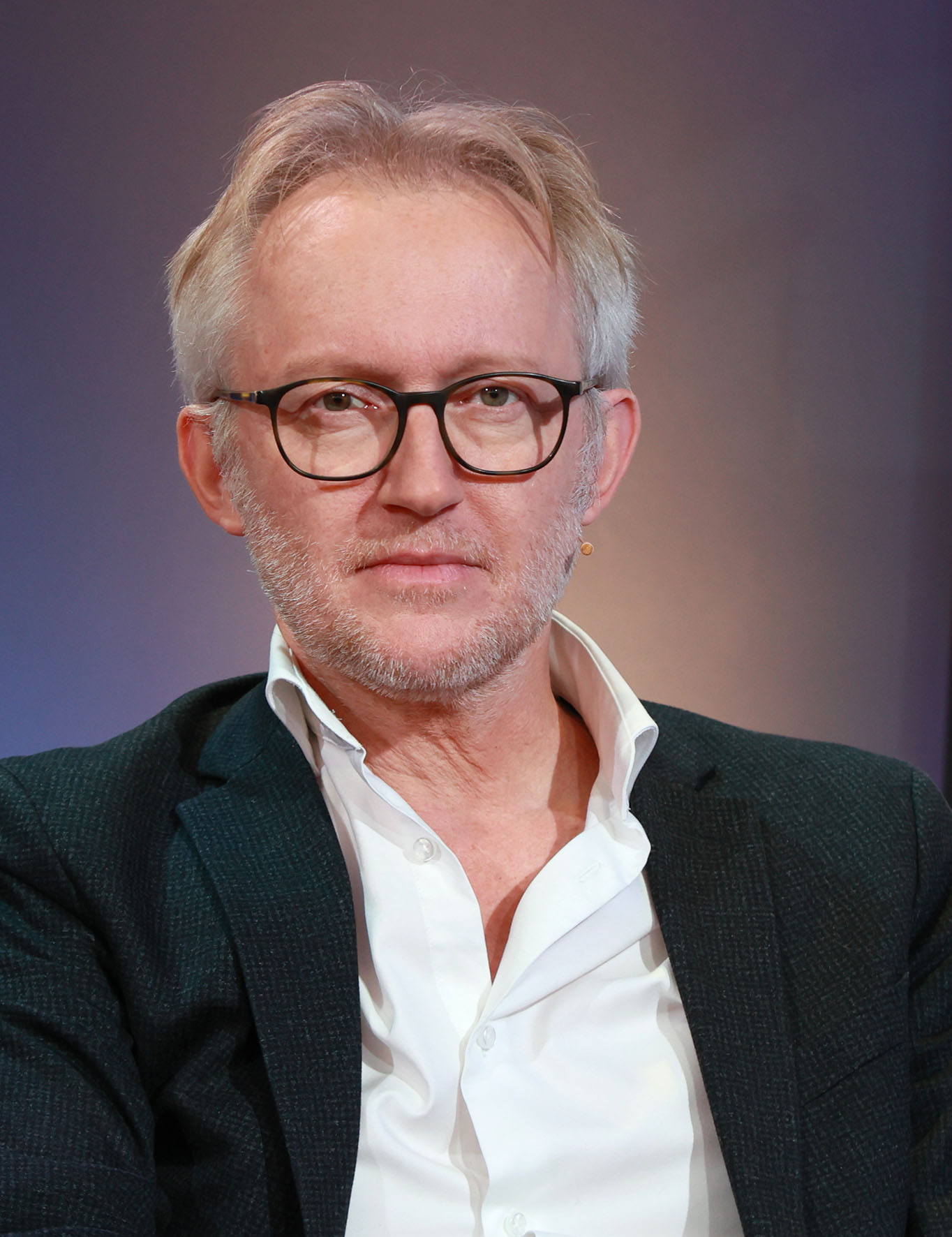
- David Van Reybrouck
- Born: 11 September 1971 (age 54); Bruges
- Occupation: Author

David Grégoire Van Reybrouck (born 11 September 1971, in Bruges) is a Belgian cultural historian, archaeologist and author. He writes historical fiction, literary non-fiction, novels, poetry, plays and academic texts. He has received several awards for his works, which include Congo: The Epic History of a People and Revolusi.

== Background and education ==
Van Reybrouck was born into a family of florists, bookbinders and artists. His father, a farmer's son, spent five years in the Democratic Republic of the Congo as a railway engineer immediately after independence. He holds a doctorate from Leiden University.

== Writings ==
Van Reybrouck's first book, De Plaag (in English: The Plague), was a cross between a travelogue and a literary whodunnit set in post-apartheid South Africa. It received several awards, including the prize for the best Flemish debut in 2002 and a shortlist nomination for the Gouden Uil, one of the leading literary prizes in the Low Countries. It was translated into Afrikaans, French and Hungarian. A longtime op-ed writer for the Flemish national newspaper De Morgen, Van Reybrouck has co-edited a volume on the federal future of Belgium (What Belgium Stands For: a Scenario, 2007) and a pamphlet, Pleidooi voor populisme (A Plea for Populism, 2008), which was met with controversy. The latter won the Netherlands' most distinguished essay prize.

His book Congo. Een geschiedenis (in English: Congo: The Epic History of a People) was published in 2010. It is based on his ten journeys through the Democratic Republic of the Congo and the use of libraries and archives. He has interviewed hundreds of individuals, with a particular predilection for so-called "ordinary people", precisely because their lives and choices are so often extraordinary. The book portrays slavery and colonialism, resistance and survival. It includes archival material, interviews and personal observations. Congo. Een geschiedenis has been translated into English, French, German, Italian, Norwegian, Polish, Swedish, Danish and Finnish. Van Reybrouck has also been actively involved in organising literary workshops for Congolese playwrights in Kinshasa and Goma.

In 2016 he published the English language version of Against Elections: The Case for Democracy where he advocates for a deliberative democracy based on sortition.

In 2020 he published Revolusi which applies to Indonesia the method he used in Congo - a combination of interviews with Indonesian Nationalists and genocide perpetrators that live in complete impunity. It discusses the events that led to the start of Indonesia's military dictatorship, with historical interpretation.

In 2022 he published De kolonisatie van de toekomst (in English: The Colonization of the Future), where he argues that we should not only focus on the injustices of past colonialism but also on today's injustices impacting present and future generations.

== Awards and honours ==
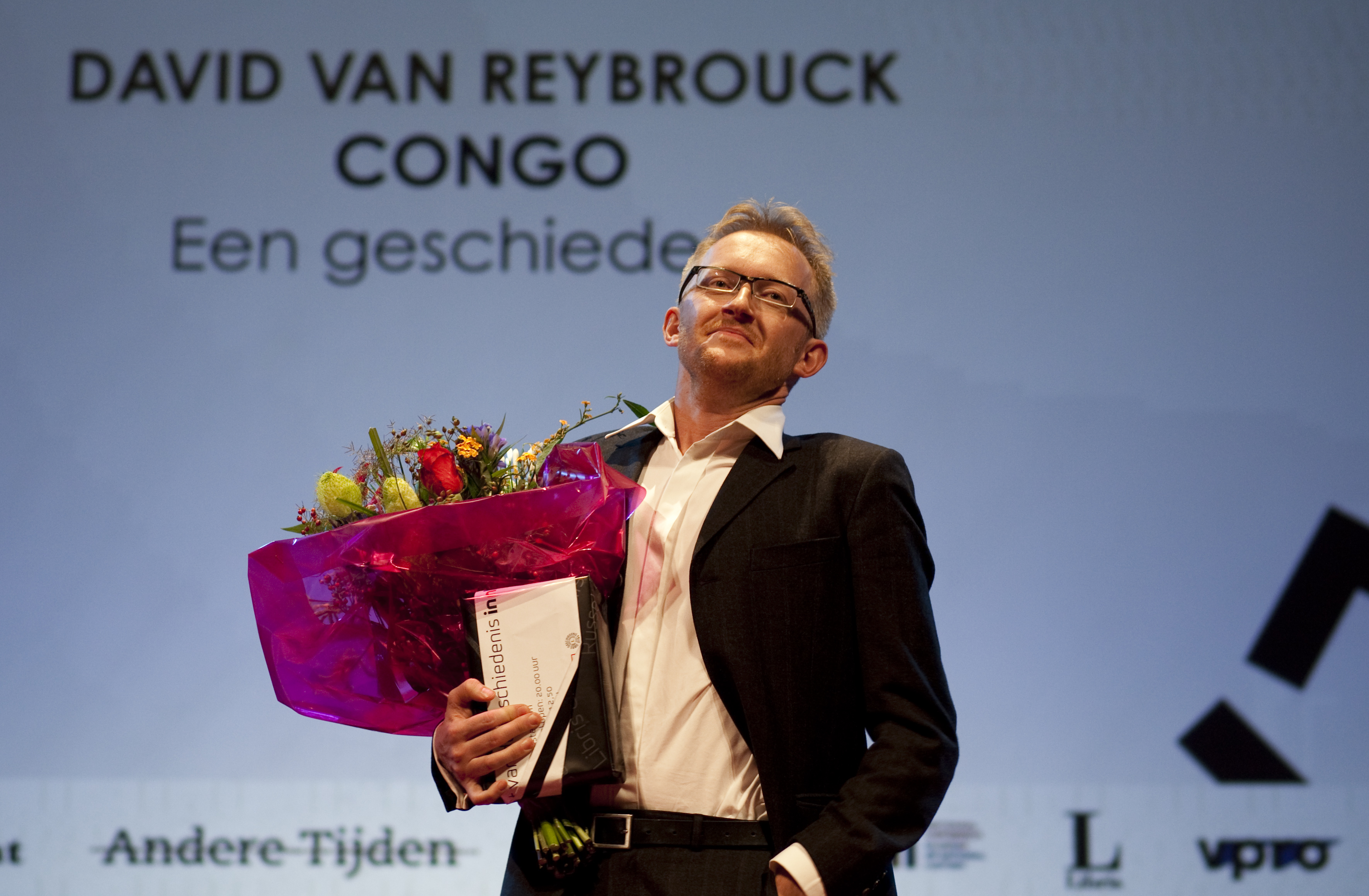
Libris History Prize (2010)

- 2004, Taalunie Toneelschrijfprijs
- 2007, Royal Academy of Dutch Language and Literature
- 2008, Ark Prize of the Free Word, Missie (play)
- 2010, AKO Literature Prize, Congo
- 2010, Libris History Prize (The Dutch, not the Canadian award), Congo
- 2012, Prix Médicis essai, Congo
- 2014, Gouden Ganzenveer
- 2015, Doctor Honoris Causa of Saint-Louis University, Brussels
- 2017, European Book Prize, fiction for Zink. Although a work of non-fiction, it won the fiction category.
- 2018, European Press Prize, nominated for "Should media report differently in the wake of attacks? Think about it and join the discussion!"
- 2025, Goethe Medal
- 2025 In March 2025, David Van Reybrouck was named "Thinker of the Netherlands", on the grounds that he is a supporter of "geocentric consciousness", that is, "a way of thinking that does not start from man, but from the well-being of the earth".

== Publications (English) ==
- 2000, From Primitives to Primates. A history of ethnographic and primatological analogies in the study of prehistory. Leiden, Sidestone Press, 2012. (Dissertation Leiden University, 2000). ISBN 978-90-8890-095-2
- 2008, Missie (play)
- 2014, Congo: The Epic History of a People. Transl. by Sam Garrett. HarperCollins. ISBN 9780062200112
- 2015, The First World War Now. ISBN 978-9492081070
- 2016, Against Elections: The Case for Democracy. Random House UK. ISBN 978-1847924223
- 2024, Revolusi: Indonesia and the Birth of the Modern World. W. W. Norton & Company. ISBN 978-1324073697

== Publications (Dutch) ==
- 2016, essay "Zink" about Neutral Moresnet. 47 pages. ISBN 9789059653597
- 2020, Revolusi - Indonesië en het ontstaan van de moderne wereld. De Bezige Bij, Amsterdam. ISBN 9789403183404
- 2022, De kolonisatie van de toekomst. De Bezige Bij. ISBN 9789403183718
