= Peter Raedts =

Dutch historian (1948–2021)

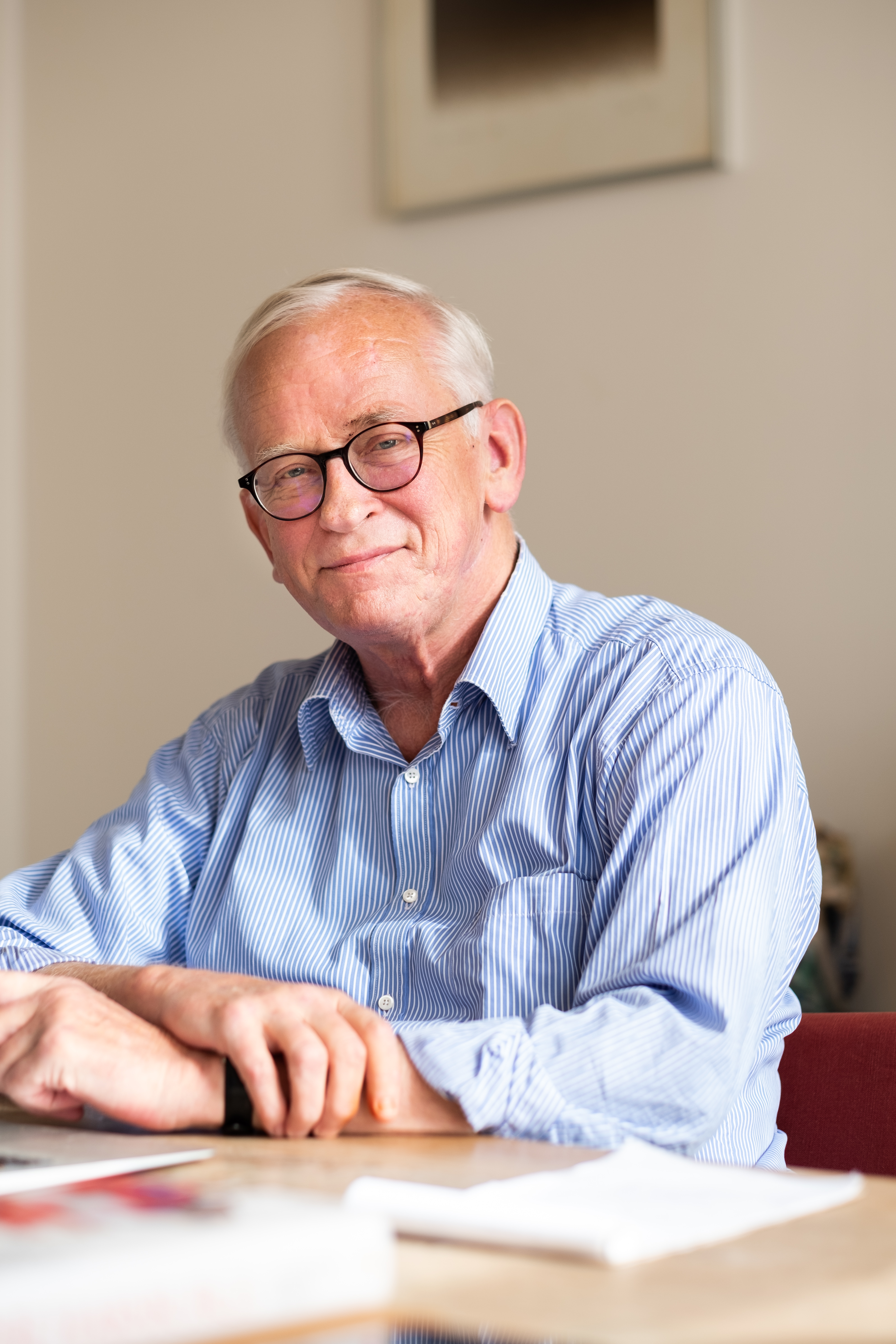
Raedts in 2020

P.G.J.M. "Peter" Raedts (1 November 1948 – 27 February 2021) was a leading Dutch medievalist, best known for the book De ontdekking van de middeleeuwen ("The discovery of the Middle Ages"), which took him eight years to write.

== Biography ==
Peter Raedts was born and grew up in Heerlen in a Catholic family. At the age of eighteen he became a member of the Society of Jesus. He studied theology in Amsterdam and history at Utrecht University. He obtained his doctorate at the University of Oxford under the supervision of Richard Southern with a thesis on Richard Rufus of Cornwall. In 1984 Raedts started lecturing on Church history at the Catholic University of Utrecht. He also worked at Leiden University before being appointed a professor at Radboud University in Nijmegen. He retired in 2013, but continued to provide historical consultancy for Museum Catharijneconvent in Utrecht, where he died.

== Publications (selection) ==
- 'The Children's Crusade of 1212', Journal of Medieval History 3 (1977), 279–324.
- Richard Rufus of Cornwall and the Tradition of Oxford Theology, Oxford 1987 (doctoral thesis).
- 'The medieval city as a holy place', in: Charles Caspers and Marc Schneiders (eds.), Omnes circumadstantes (Kampen 1990) 144–154.
- 'Ter verdediging van kerk en vaderland, Het middeleeuwse verleden tussen Renaissance en Verlichting', Tijdschrift voor Geschiedenis 115 (2002) 356–382
- 'Representations of the Middle Ages in Enlightenment Historiography', The medieval history journal 5 (2002) 1–20.
- ‘Ordering the medieval past: England and the continent compared’, Communio Viatorum 46 (2004) 168–191.
- ‘Scholasticism’, in: E.A. Livingstone (ed), The Oxford Dictionary of the Christian Church (3rd edition; Oxford 2005) 1476–1479.
- De ontdekking van de Middeleeuwen: Geschiedenis van een illusie, Amsterdam 2011.
- De uitvinding van de rooms-katholieke kerk, Amsterdam 2013.
