= Pieter Steinz =

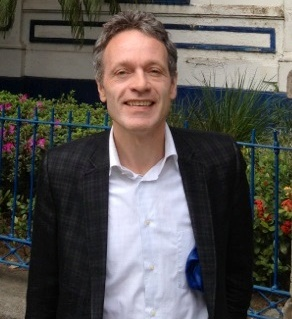
Pieter Steinz

Pieter Steinz (6 October 1963 in Rotterdam – 29 August 2016 in Haarlem) was a Dutch journalist, literary critic and non-fiction author. From 2012 to 2015 he was director of the Nederlands Letterenfonds.

== Bibliography ==
- 1991 Meneer Van Dale Wacht Op Antwoord en andere schoolse rijtjes en ezelsbruggetjes
- 2002 Reis om de wereld in 80 hits (with Bernard Hulsman)
- 2002 Drumeiland. Een bedevaart naar Bob Marley's geboorte-eiland Jamaica
- 2003 Lezen &cetera. Gids voor de wereldliteratuur (reviseer edition: 2006)
- 2004 Lezen op locatie. Atlas van de wereldliteratuur
- 2006 Klein cultureel woordenboek van de wereldliteratuur (in 2008 reprinted as Het ABC van de wereldliteratuur)
- 2006 Elk boek wil muziek zijn. Lezen & luisteren in schema’s, thema’s en citaten (with Peter de Bruijn)
- 2007 Het web van de wereldliteratuur. Welke 100 boeken hebben de literaire X-factor?
- 2010 De duivelskunstenaar. De reis van doctor Faust door 500 jaar cultuurgeschiedenis
- 2010 Grote verwachtingen. Opgroeien in de letteren in 25 schema's
- 2011 Luisteren &cetera. Het web van de popmuziek in de jaren zeventig (with Bertram Mourits)
- 2011 Macbeth heeft echt geleefd. Een reis door Europa in de voetsporen van 16 literaire helden (in 2014 reprinted as Dracula heeft echt geleefd)
- 2011 Verleden in verf. De Nederlandse geschiedenis in veertig schilderijen (with Hans den Hartog Jager)
- 2014 Made in Europe. De kunst die ons continent bindt
- 2014 Luisteren &cetera. Het web van de popmuziek in de jaren tachtig (with Bertram Mourits)
- 2015 Steinz. Gids voor de wereldliteratuur in 416 schrijvers, 104 meesterwerken, 26 one-book wonders, 52 boekwebben, 26 thema's, 26 quizzen en 52 landkaarten (with Jet Steinz)
- 2015 Waanzin in de wereldliteratuur (Boekenweekessay)
- 2015 Lezen met ALS: Literatuur als levensbehoefte

== About Steinz ==
- Bertram Mourits: 'Levensbericht Pieter Steinz'. In: Jaarboek van de Maatschappij der Nederlandse Letterkunde te Leiden, 2024-2025, p. 238-247
