= Global journalism =

News style encompassing a global outlook

Global journalism is a news style that encompasses a global outlook and reports on issues that transcend national boundaries, such as climate change. It focuses on news that is transnational, considering issues that affect the relationships between multiple nation states and regions. Global journalism is not to be confused with foreign reporting, which is reporting on foreign issues within a domestic context and using a domestic outlook that does not involve finding commonality between multiple world regions. In contrast, global journalism seeks to explore and communicate how the economic, political, social, and ecological events that occur in multiple parts of the world are connected, and that commonalities do exist outside national boundaries.

Global Journalism has been produced out of the increasingly interconnected and interdependent world that has formed as a result of globalization. Globalization has exposed the existence of complex relations between different social realities worldwide, therefore, global journalism is a news-style which investigates these relations and contextualizes them within everyday life. It must cultivate a transnational culture of news which integrates seemingly independent events and relates them to all peoples and places on a daily basis because globalization is a daily process.

== Definitions ==
Scholars such as Stephen Ward feel that traditional media practices are typically designed to deal with news on the national rather than global level, which negatively impacts an outlet's ability to report on news on the global level. Global journalism focuses on globally-minded ethics to serve the changing world that journalism inhabits. Peter Berglez believes that the focus of global journalism is the increasingly complex relations caused by globalization and that while global journalism exists in news, it has yet to be defined and established as a style, and is often confused with foreign journalism. He also conceptualizes global journalism into three different relationships- global space, global powers, and global identities- which he believes are a common factor in representations of global journalism and thus, could be helpful to the empirical studies of global journalism as a news style. Global space refers to considering the world as one, unified place where an event can occur in multiple parts of the world at the same time. Global power refers to how global journalism represents power in that it is creating power that is transnational and global, thus slowly degrading national powers that are confined within nation-states. Lastly, global identity refers to the representation of transnational identity that transcends national territories. To be more specific about how global identity occurs in the news media, Berglez further identifies three ways this could take place. Firstly, it would include the struggles of global identities in the news. Secondly, through placing the public in a global context as unified global people. Lastly, through targeting similar identities across the globe.

Sarah Van Leuven and Peter Berglez define the phenomena of global journalism occurring outside the field of traditional foreign news media. They note that global journalism can be defined in multiple ways. However, in this context, it relates to the broader fields of communication and media studies. They then go on to define it as a practice that assesses how events, stories, etc. are interrelated in different parts of the world, which has occurred due to globalization and digitization.

Johan Lindell and Michael Karlsson define global journalism as journalism that sees the interrelationships between different parts of the world, and thus provide a "global outlook". In addition, they identify three principles for global journalism or more specifically the role that journalists would play in global journalism. First of all, journalists must become global agents of the global public sphere instead of a nation-state or local states. Secondly, journalists must prioritize the global public sphere, as in their audience are the citizens of the world. Lastly, journalists must promote a global outlook in opposition to a local or national outlook.

Cottle defines global journalism as journalism that is founded on the bases of global interconnectivity, lack of boundaries, and mobility.

== Global Outlook ==
A global outlook places global events within the context of a global social reality, as opposed to a domestic or foreign outlook, which places events in the context of individual countries or regions, and explains how these events impact that one particular region. This means that global journalism addresses news audiences as members of a single global population rather than segmented populations connected to nation-states. It achieves a global outlook and transnational style of address by always framing stories within a global context when selecting the mode of explanation, angles chosen, and sources. A global outlook considers multiple viewpoints from different nations without favoring any individual nation's perspective.

== History ==
Firstly, to explain the history of global journalism, it must be established that global journalism is an emerging practice amongst the journalistic field that has much scope and several implications on the global public sphere. Considering this, it still is a fairly new notion that requires much-needed conceptualization. In other words, global journalism is occurring at an unprecedented rate, yet academia and scholars lack not only the empirical evidence but also proper conceptualization of the term.

Some early instances of global journalism can be seen in the nineteenth century when the creation of international new agencies emerged. However the major instances can be seen since the 1980s, when the technological changes transformed the dissemination of news and political communications. In specific, the technological change of increased satellite capacity that allowed for the dissemination of news and information transnationally, thus establishing the seeds of global journalism. The transition from networks of 'relativity' to the networks of 'connectivity' created the notions of a global public sphere.

== Examples ==
Since the conception of global journalism is still fairly new, exact and direct examples are hard to come by. Thus, the criteria of being considered as an example is to see which news media outlets and organizations consider the "global outlook" to some extent. In other words, since there are no established news media that solely report global journalism, there is an extent to what can be considered a direct example of global journalism. However, having noted that, the following news media outlets and organizations can be considered initial examples of global journalism.

CNNI International

- CNN International (CNNI)- deliver a global outlook on financial reporting
- BBC World- deliver a global outlook on financial reporting
- Reuters- deliver a global outlook on financial reporting
- Le Monde- although this is a national newspaper, it is found to deliver heavily on a global outlook
- BBC's World Service Television (BBC-WS-TV)- delivers programmes worldwide
- Al Jazeera- transnational news channel for the Arab community
- ZEE TV- transnational channel targeting the Indian community worldwide
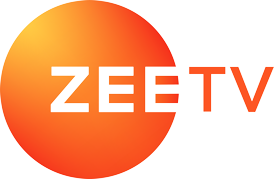
  ZEE TV

In addition to these examples, Van Leuven and Berglez also find that there are studies that show the news content moving away from a national perspective to a global outlook. Moreover, Cottle also takes note of the trends of presenting global crises through a global outlook.
