= Piet Hagen =

Dutch non-fiction writer

Pieter Jacobus Hagen
- Born: 1942 (age 83–84); Zwijndrecht, The Netherlands
- Occupations: Journalist, author
- Writing career
- Genres: Non-fiction, history

Pieter Jacobus Hagen (1942) is a Dutch journalist and non-fiction author, who started his career as a reporter for the national newspaper Trouw in 1967. Later he served as teacher and dean of the School of Journalism in Utrecht (1983–1995), editor-in-chief of De Journalist/Villamedia (1995–2002), and columnist for NRC Handelsblad (2003–2005). He has been publishing non-fiction books since 1982, and has been a full-time author of history books since 2002.

In his books on blood transfusion (1982 and 1993) he criticized the commercialization of human blood and plasma components. In 2010, he published a biography of Dutch politician Pieter Jelles Troelstra, for which he was awarded the triennial Dr. Joast Halbertsmaprijs in the Dutch province of Friesland in 2012. His overview of colonial wars in Indonesia (2018) offers a new perspective on the past five centuries: military violence was the backbone of colonialism.

== Bibliography ==
- Blood: Gift or Merchandise, New York, 1982
- Hoe wij leren lezen, Tilburg, 1984
- Wetenschap in het nieuws, Groningen, 1991
- Blood transfusion in Europe, a white paper, Council of Europe, 1993
- Journalisten in Nederland, een persgeschiedenis in portretten, Amsterdam, 2002
- Politicus uit hartstocht, biografie van Pieter Jelles Troelstra, Amsterdam, 2010
- Koloniale oorlogen in Indonesië, Amsterdam, 2018
- Dubbel zondebok. Joodse journalisten in tijden van antisemitisme en vervolging. Amsterdam 2022
- Joodse klokkenluiders. Hoe Alfred Wiener en David Cohen waarschuwden voor nazi-Duitsland. Almere 2023
- Persbaron M.S. Vaz Dias. Kroniek van een Joods familiebedrijf. Amsterdam 2026
