= 2024 Nobel Prize in Literature =

Award

- Han Kang
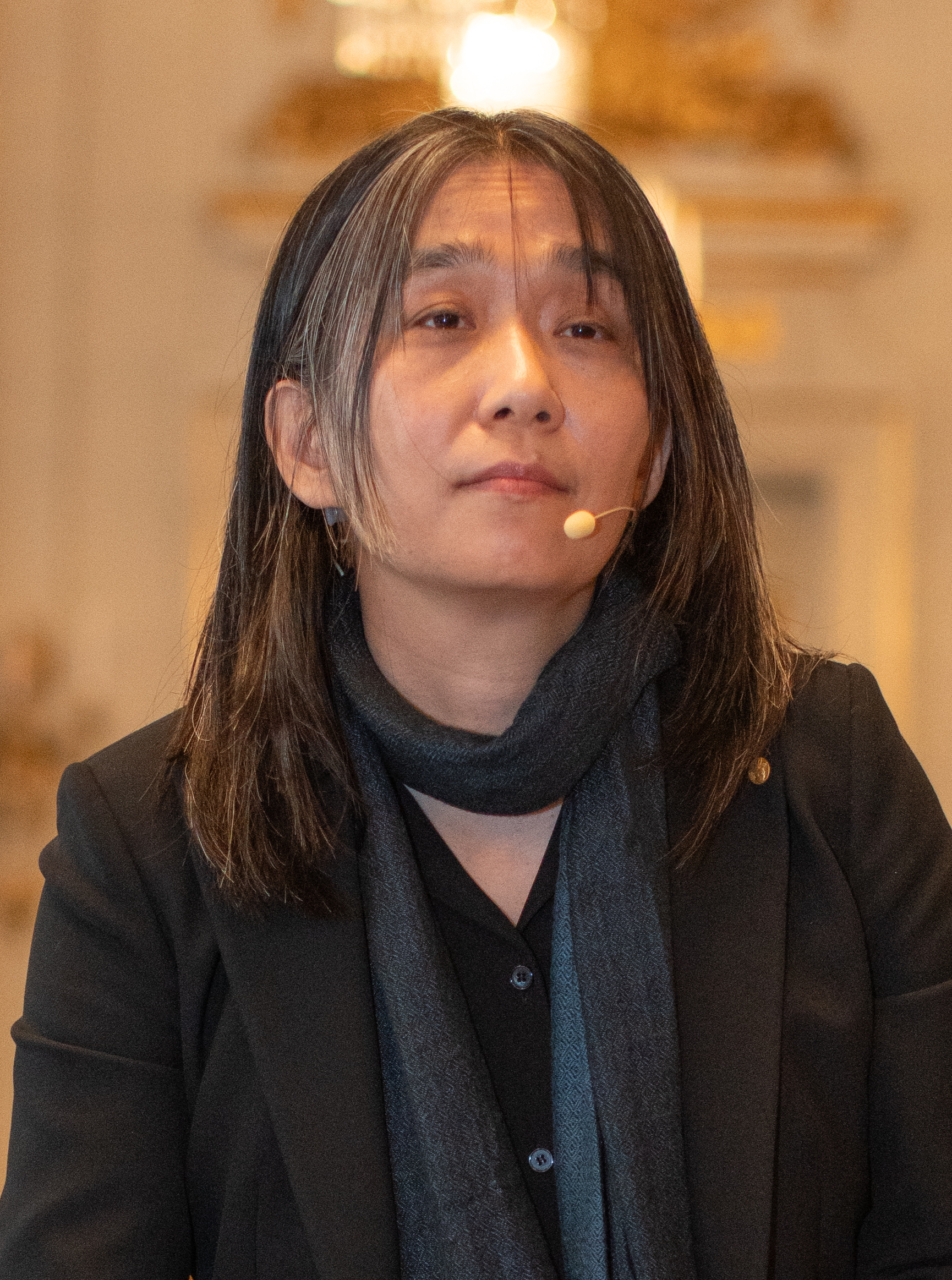
- "for her intense poetic prose that confronts historical traumas and exposes the fragility of human life."
- Date: 10 October 2024 (announcement); 10 December 2024 (ceremony)
- Location: Stockholm, Sweden
- Presented by: Swedish Academy
- First award: 1901
- Website: Official website

In 2024, the Nobel Prize in Literature was awarded to the South Korean author Han Kang (born 1970) "for her intense poetic prose that confronts historical traumas and exposes the fragility of human life". It was announced by the Swedish Academy in Stockholm, Sweden, on 10 October 2024 and was awarded on 10 December 2024.

She is the first South Korean and first Asian woman to win the Nobel Prize in Literature, making her the 18th woman to win the Nobel Prize in Literature and the tenth Asian laureate in that Nobel Prize category.

== Laureate ==
Han Kang grew up with a literary background in Seoul, her father, Han Seung-won, being a reputed novelist. Alongside her passion for writing, she spends time exploring arts and music, which is reflected throughout her literary production. She started her career in 1993 with the publication of her poems in the literary magazine Literature and Society, and had her debut prose publication in 1995 with the short story collection Love of Yeosu (여수의 사랑). Her major breakthrough came with the 2007 novel The Vegetarian, a book that portrays the violent consequences that ensue when its protagonist suddenly begins to refuse to eat meat. Her experimental and often disturbing stories are characterized by a double exposure of pain and a correspondence between mental and physical torment, confronting historical traumas and invisible sets of rules and the fragility of human life. Her other well-known works include Human Acts, The White Book, Greek Lessons, and We Do Not Part.

== Candidates ==
On Ladbrokes, the top favourites to be awarded the 2024 Nobel Prize in Literature were Chinese author Can Xue, Australian Gerald Murnane, Japanese Haruki Murakami, Canadians Margaret Atwood and Anne Carson (awarded in 2026), American Thomas Pynchon and Argentinian César Aira. Han Kang's odds to win the prize were 33/1, behind perennial favourites such as Kenyan Ngugi Wa Thiong’o, Indian-born British-American Salman Rushdie, Hungarians Péter Nádas and László Krasznahorkai (awarded in 2025), Romanian Mircea Cărtărescu, Russian Lyudmila Ulitskaya, American Don DeLillo and French Michel Houellebecq.

== Prize announcement ==
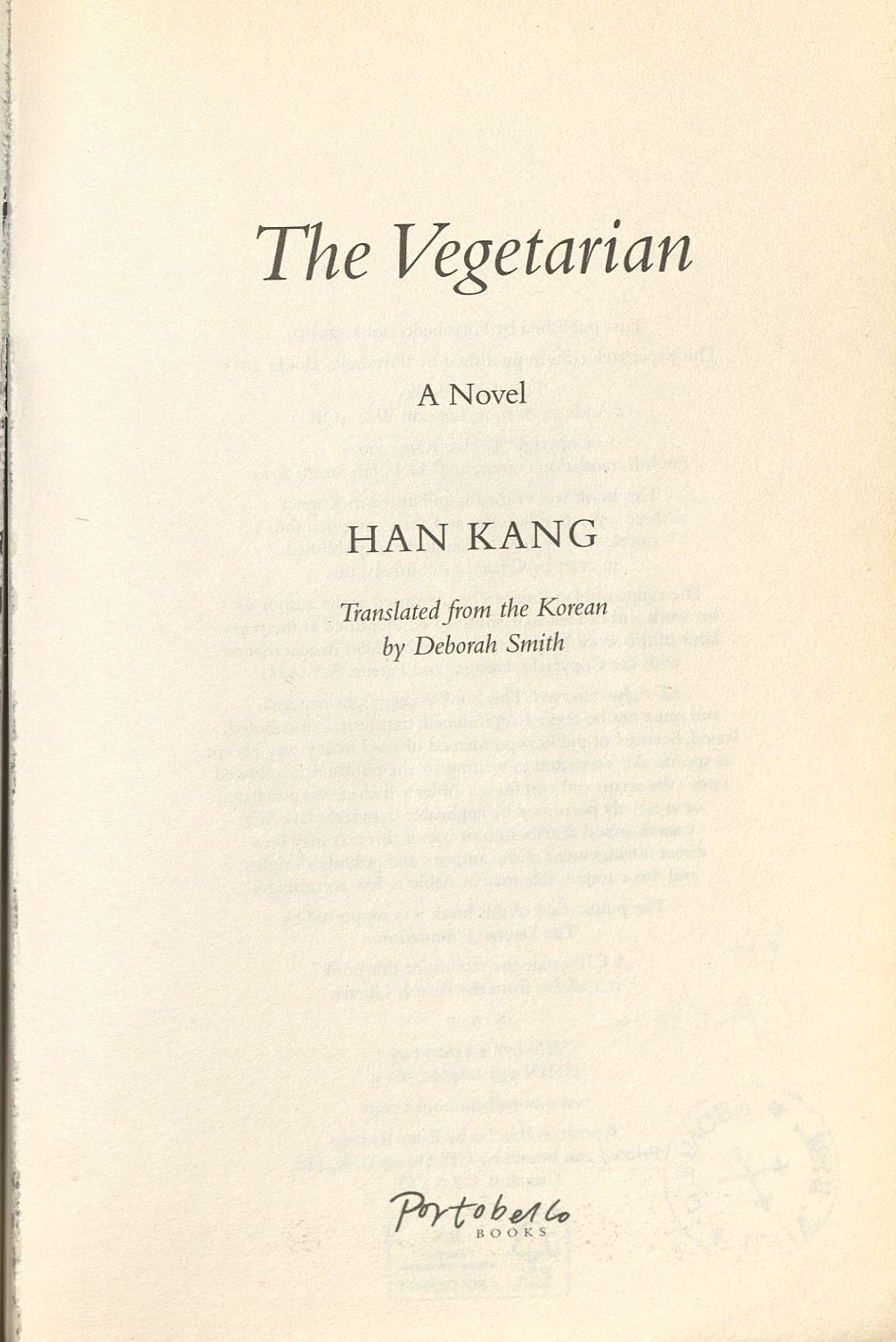
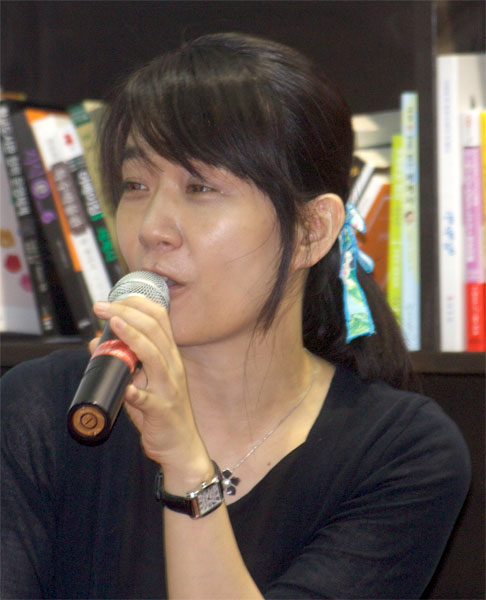
In 2016, Han Kang's novel The Vegetarian [채식주의자] that was translated into English by Deborah Smith won the International Booker Prize.

After the announcement, Anders Olsson, chairman of the Academy's Nobel Committee, said in a statement:

"She has a unique awareness of the connections between body and soul, the living and the dead, and in her poetic and experimental style has become an innovator in contemporary prose."

Anna-Karin Palm was interviewed by Carin Klaesson, a correspondent of the Nobel Prize Museum, and described Han Kang's writing with the following statement:

"I would say this is a very rich and complex oeuvre that spans many genres, and [she] writes really intense lyrical prose that is both tender and brutal and, sometimes, slightly surrealistic as well... There's a continuity as to themes that is quite remarkable but at the same time a huge stylistic variation that makes every book a new aspect or a new expression of these central themes."

== Reactions ==
=== Personal reactions ===
Han Kang had just finished dinner with her son at her home in Seoul when she received the information. Both she and her son were so surprised that they did not even have the time to properly discuss it. She stated that she was "honored" to receive the prize. Being the first Nobel laureate in literature in South Korea, she said:

"Yes. I grew up with books, you know, so since when I was a child, I grew up with books in Korean and translated as well. So I can say I grew up with Korean literature, which I feel very close to. So I hope this news is nice for Korean literature readers and my friends, writers... For me, since when I was a child, all writers have been collective. They are searching meanings in life. Sometimes they are lost and sometimes they are determined and all their efforts and all their strengths have been my inspiration. So it's very difficult for me to pick some names of the inspiration. It's very difficult for me."

Asked by Nobel correspondent, Jenny Rydén, where someone just discovering her work should start, she suggested:

"I think every writer likes his or her most recent book. So my most recent book is We Do Not Part or it is called I Do Not Bid Farewell or Impossible Goodbyes. I hope this book could be a start. And Human Acts is connected directly with this book We Do Not Part. And then The White Book, which is very personal book for me. Because it's quite autobiographical. And there is The Vegetarian. But I feel the start could be We Do Not Part.

Later on, Han Kang said her celebrations would be low-key: "After this phone call I'd like to have tea with - I don't drink so - I'm going to have tea with my son and I'll celebrate it quietly tonight."

=== International reactions ===
Discussing the choice of Han Kang as the Nobel laureate on Sveriges Television minutes after the announcement, a panel of the Swedish literature critics Ingrid Elam, Jonas Thente and author Lyra Ekström Lindbäck disagreed on the Swedish Academy's choice. Elam said it was a very good choice, calling Han Kang "a fantastic author", while the others had not been impressed by her writing. "Nobody is going to remember her in fifty years' time", Thente said.

A negative reaction also appeared in Expressen by literature critic Victor Malm who called it "a rather weak choice". Svenska Dagbladet's literature editor Josefin de Gregorio was pleased with the choice, praising Han Kang for her "dynamic, transgressive writing that portrays deep evil and great trauma with lyrical beauty and vulnerability" and the Academy's choice of a young and popular writer. Irish novelist Eimear McBride was also pleased, calling Han Kang "one of the greatest living writers"; “She is a voice for women, for truth and, above all, for the power of what literature can be. This is a very richly deserved win.”

The choice of Han Kang was well received by several German commentators, who found it a good choice and positive that the Swedish Academy after heavy focus on European literature in recent years had chosen a writer from another part of the world. "One can call it strange for an award that aims to do comparative justice to all national literatures that so far so few Asian or African authors have been given consideration”, Andreas Platthaus in the Frankfurter Allgemeine Zeitung wrote.

==== South Korean reactions ====
While visiting Laos for a meeting of Asian leaders, South Korean president Yoon Suk Yeol posted on his Facebook account his warmest greetings, saying:

"It is a monumental achievement in the history of Korean literature and a national celebration that brings joy to all the people. You have transformed the painful wounds of our modern history into a great literary work. I extend my deepest respect to you for elevating the value of Korean literature."

BTS member V shared in the news on Instagram, writing: "I read your book 'Human Act: A Novel' in the army. Congratulations" alongside a bowing emoji. The literary critic Kim Seong-shin expressed that the Academy's choice of Han was beyond reproach, affirming: "I'd say she is the most deserving Korean novelist to be awarded the Nobel Prize."

A number of South Korean writers celebrated the news, among them Min Jin Lee, author of Pachinko, who commented: "Han Kang is a brilliant novelist who reflects our modern condition with courage, imagination, and intelligence. She is most worthy of this global recognition." Science fiction author Kim Bo-young said, "We cheer and rejoice. I am even prouder and happier that this winning of the prize directly refutes the foolishness of trying to hide and distort Korea's past history."

== Nobel lecture ==
Han Kang delivered her Nobel lecture on 7 December 2024 at the Swedish Academy in Stockholm. Entitled Light and thread, she talked about the thread of language that connects people.

== Award ceremony ==
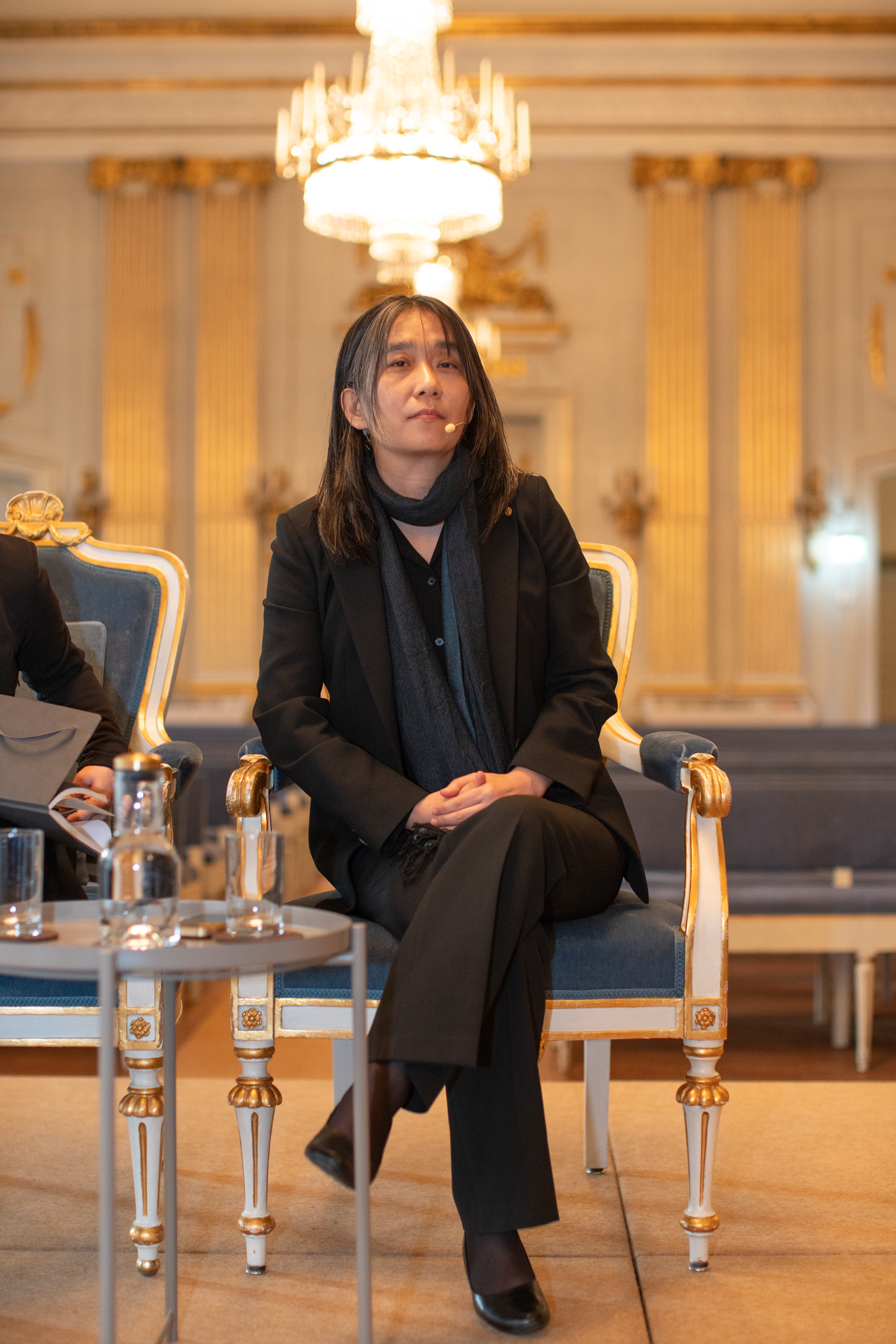
Han Kang at the press conference in Stockholm prior to the award ceremony.

At the award ceremony in Stockholm on 10 December 2024, Ellen Mattson of the Swedish Academy and the Nobel committee spoke about the major theme in Han Kang's writing represented by two recurring colours:

The white is the snow that falls in so many of her books, drawing a protective curtain between the narrator and the world, but white is also the colour of sorrow, and of death. Red stands for life, but also for pain, blood, the deep cuts of a knife. While her voice can be seductively soft, it speaks of indescribable cruelty, of irreparable loss. (...) The white and the red symbolize a historical experience that Han returns to in her novels.

== Nobel Committee ==
The 2024 Nobel Committee is composed of the following members:

Committee Members
Seat No.	Picture	Name	Elected	Position	Profession
4		Anders Olsson (b. 1949)	2008	committee chair	literary critic, literary historian
11		Mats Malm (b. 1964)	2018	associate member permanent secretary	translator, literary historian, editor
9		Ellen Mattson (b. 1963)	2019	member	novelist, essayist
14		Steve Sem-Sandberg (b. 1958)	2021	member	journalist, author, translator
13		Anne Swärd (b. 1969)	2019	member	novelist
16		Anna-Karin Palm (b. 1961)	2023	associate member	novelist, culture writer
