= Kim Wook-Dong =

Korean literary scholar (born 1948)

- Born: March 13, 1948; Incheon, South Korea
- Education: Hankuk University of Foreign Studies (B.A. in English Literature); University of Mississippi(M.A. in English); Stony Brook University(Ph.D. in English)
- Alma mater: Hankuk University of Foreign Studies
- Occupations: Professor of English literature Translator; Literary critic
- Writing career
- Language: Korean, English
- Years active: 1988-

Korean name
- Hangul: 김욱동
- Hanja: 金旭東
- RR: Gim Ukdong
- MR: Kim Uktong
- IPA: [kim.uk̚.t͈oŋ]

Wook-Dong Kim (Korean: 김욱동; born March 13, 1948) is a South Korean literary scholar, critic, and translator. He is best known to the Korean public as the translator of The Old Man and the Sea by Ernest Hemingway and To Kill a Mockingbird by Harper Lee. As a literary critic, Wook-Dong Kim has published works on literary criticism and Western critical theories, including Postmodernism, post-structuralism, and ecologism. He has also written books on translations and translation theory.

== Life ==
Wook-Dong Kim was born in Incheon, South Korea on March 13, 1948. He graduated with a BA in English from Hankuk University of Foreign Studies, in South Korea. During university, he translated Max Shulman's Love Is a Fantasy and published it in an annual school magazine. It was his first translation to be printed on paper. He also graduated from the Graduate School of English Literature at Hankuk University of Foreign Studies. Right after graduating from graduate school, he translated Benjamin Franklin's The Whistle and it was published in the monthly magazine Samtoh, a culture magazine founded in 1970 and published in Jong-ro, Seoul, Korea. He received his MA in English from the University of Mississippi with the thesis Joe Christmas as an Existentialist in 1978. He earned his Ph.D. in English from the State University of New York at Stony Brook with his dissertation The Edge of Nothing: An Existentialist Reading of William Faulkner in 1981. He was appointed as a professor at Sogang University in 1982. He published his first book, Dialogic Imagination: Bakthin's Literature Theory (대화적 상상력: 바흐친의 문학이론, 1988) in 1988, during which he was a visiting professor at Harvard University. He also served as a visiting professor at Duke University and the University of North Carolina.
In 2005, He applied for voluntary retirement from his professorship at Sogang University and became a professor in the School of English for Interpretation and Translation at Hankuk University of Foreign Studies. He retired in 2013 and is currently a professor emeritus of English Literature at Sogang University. In 2013, he gave lectures on Hemingway at public libraries and continuing education centers as part of a lecture program launched by the Seoul Metropolitan Ministry of Education, targeted toward a general audience. He was a visiting professor in the School of Liberal Arts at the Ulsan National Institute of Science and Technology from 2015 to 2020.

== Works ==
Wook-Dong Kim is a prolific author whose field of study includes various topics such as American Literature, literary criticism, Korean modern literature, and translation studies. Regarding criticism that he does not focus on one specific area, Wook-Dong Kim stated:

Some called me a 'slash-and-burn scholar' because I set fire all over the place instead of scrutinizing one field of study. I take it as a compliment, not as a cynical remark. In terms of research methodology, to be a 'settler' or a 'slash-and-burn farmer' is merely a matter of choice.

Wook-Dong Kim is known for introducing Western critical theory to Korean readers and applying it to analyze Korean literature and cultural phenomena. In his book, 7 Ways of Reading The Square (광장을 읽는 7가지 방법, 1996), Wook-Dong Kim analyzes The Square (광장, 1960), a classic piece of Korean literature written by Choi In-hun, through the lens of historical criticism, formalism, psychologism, sociological criticism, myth criticism, structuralism, and postmodernism.

== Selected publications ==
=== Research in American literature ===
- Understanding American Literature (미국 소설의 이해, 2001) ISBN 9788971396063
- Empire of Fiction (소설의 제국, 2008) ISBN 9788971390719
- For Hemingway (헤밍웨이를 위하여, 2012) ISBN 9788994228433
- For Faulkner (포크너를 위하여, 2013) ISBN 9788994228600

=== Literary criticism ===
- Modernism and Postmodernism (모더니즘과 포스트모더니즘, 2004) ISBN 9788932312101
- Postmodernism (포스트모더니즘, 2004) ISBN 9788937454349
- From Red to Green (적색에서 녹색으로, 2011) ISBN 9788991601031
- The Dialectic of Literary Criticism (비평의 변증법, 2022) ISBN 9791191131420
- Kazantzakis's Zorba the Greek: Five Readings (2019) ISBN 9781527522534

=== Modern Korean novel ===
- 7 Ways of Reading The Square (광장을 읽는 7가지 방법, 1996) ISBN 9788932008165
- Seo Jae-pil the Novelist (소설가 서재필, 2010) ISBN 9788972731634
- Global Perspectives on Korean Literature (2019) ISBN 9789811387272
- Korean Literature in the Age of Destitution (궁핍한 시대의 한국문학, 2022) ISBN 9791160871043

=== Translation studies ===
- Translation and Korean Modernity (번역과 한국의 근대, 2010) ISBN 9788956264721
- The Maze of Translation: Twelve Questions about Translation (번역의 미로, 2011) ISBN 9788993905687
- The Culture of Mistranslation (오역의 문화, 2014) ISBN 9788993905687
- Translations in Korea: Theory and Practice (2019) ISBN 9789811365126
- The Path of a Translator (번역가의 길, 2023) ISBN 9791160871050

== Translated works ==
Wook-Dong Kim translated the largest number of books from The Complete Series of World Literature (세계문학전집) by Minumsa publishing company, one of Korea's major publishers. He translated 15 out of 415 books in the series. The works that he translated into Korean include:

- The Old Man and the Sea by Ernest Hemingway
- The Great Gatsby by F. Scott Fitzgerald
- Animal Farm by George Orwell
- To Kill a Mockingbird by Harper Lee
- The Adventures of Tom Sawyer by Mark Twain
- I Know Why the Caged Bird Sings by Maya Angelou
- The Scarlet Letter by Nathaniel Hawthorne
- For Whom the Bell Tolls by Ernest Hemingway
- Catcher in the Rye by J.D. Salinger
- The Adventures of Huckleberry Finn by Mark Twain
- Ethan Frome by Edith Wharton

== Achievements ==
Wook-Dong Kim was awarded the Grand Prize in Academic Research by the Korean Publishing Research Institute for his books Translation of the Modernity of Korea (번역과 한국의 근대, 2010) and The Maze of Translation: Twelve Questions about Translation (번역의 미로, 2011) in 2011.

== The Vegetarian translation ==
Wook-Dong Kim criticized Deborah Smith's translation of The Vegetarian (채식주의자, 2007) in his article titled "The 'Creative' English Translation of The Vegetarian by Han Kang", which was published in Translation Review on May 30, 2018. British translator Deborah Smith translated The Vegetarian authored by Korean novelist Han Kang into English and it was published in 2015. The English translation became the winner of the Man Booker International Prize in 2016.
In his article, Kim points out mistranslations in Smith's translation of The Vegetarian, including vocabulary misuse, homonymy errors, omitted text, and added text not present in the original. Kim states that he acknowledges translation requires creativity as argued by Smith but Smith's translation deviates from the original to the point of being unfaithful. Kim explains the mistranslations with examples in the Korean and English texts and offers his own translations for certain passages to convey the meaning of the original text. Kim's article drew the attention of the international audience to The Vegetarian's mistranslation, which had previously been little known outside of Korea despite numerous studies. The article currently has over 1000 views and has been cited by different sources, including The Economist.
The article was published a few weeks before the announcement of the 2018 Man Booker International Prize, in which Han Kang's The White Book, translated by Deborah Smith, was nominated. Amid concern that his publication might have a negative impact on Han Kang's winning the award, Wook-Dong Kim stated that the article was written months before Han Kang's nomination, and he had no intention of affecting the awarding process.

== Controversy ==
Wook-Dong Kim's translation of The Great Gatsby was denounced by some translators for containing many errors. In 2019, Saeum publishing company published Jeong-seo Lee(pseudonym)'s translation of The Great Gatsby, which included a 75-page section of translation notes that openly criticized the translations of Wook-Dong Kim and Young-ha Kim. The translation notes point out the two translators' translation errors in 67 different parts of the novel. Lee stated, "If you say that these translations are readable and written beautifully, you would be lying. You'd be no different from subjects praising the new clothes of Anderson's naked emperor." Yong-Seong Kim's translation of The Great Gatsby also includes translation notes that point out mistranslations or awkward translations made by Wook-Dong Kim and Young-ha Kim. Although Wook-Dong Kim did not respond openly to these criticisms, he acknowledged in an interview that his effort to be faithful to the original text might have made his translations less readable than other translations, especially compared to Young-ha Kim's more liberal translation.
