= We Do Not Part =

2021 novel by Han Kang

We Do Not Part: A Novel
- Author: Han Kang
- Translator: Choi Gyungran, Pierre Bisiou (French) e. yaewon, Paige Aniyah Morris (English)
- Language: Korean
- Genre: Literary fiction, Historical fiction
- Publisher: Munhakdongne (Korean) Grasset (French) Hogarth Press (English)
- Publication date: September 9, 2021 (Korean) August 23, 2023 (French) January 21, 2025 (English)
- Publication place: South Korea
- Pages: 332 (Korean) 336 (French) 272 (English)
- Award: French: Prix Medicis for Foreign Literature; Émile Guimet Prize for Asian Literature
- ISBN: 978-0593595459 9788954682152
- OCLC: 1482701289
- Preceded by: Greek Lessons
- Website: Official website

We Do Not Part: A Novel (Korean: 작별하지 않는다; RR: Jakbyeolhaji anneunda) is a 2021 novel by South Korean novelist Han Kang, published by Munhak. The novel follows a woman named Kyungha as she travels to Jeju Island on behalf of her friend, Inseon, and reflects upon the legacy of the Jeju massacre. Han considers the novel to form "a pair" with her previous work, Human Acts.

In 2023, a French translation by Choi Gyungran and Pierre Bisiou was published by Éditions Grasset. It went on to won the Prix Médicis for Foreign Literature in 2023, making Han the first Korean author to receive the prize. In the same year, the novel was shortlisted for the Prix Femina. Han also received the Émile Guimet Prize for Asian Literature for the novel in 2024.

An English translation by e. yaewon and Paige Aniyah Morris, published by Hogarth Press, was released on January 21, 2025.

== Plot ==
Kyungha (경하; Gyeongha) is a writer living away from her family to work on her new novel. She suffers from insomnia and is plagued by nightmares. Among these is one recurrent dream–that of snow-covered trees shaped like human beings. The nightmares began when she was working on her previous novel, which portrayed a civilian massacre resulting from state-sponsored violence. One day, Kyungha receives a text message from her old friend, Inseon (인선), asking her to visit the hospital where she has been admitted. Kyungha knows Inseon from her days of working as a freelance videographer. Later, Inseon moved to Jeju Island to look after her mother, who suffered from dementia. She quit professional videography and opened a small carpentry workshop next to her house, and earned her living by selling furniture.

At the hospital, Kyungha learns that Inseon severed her fingers at the woodworking machine a few days back. Inseon pleads with Kyungha to head to her place in Jeju to look after her pet bird, Ama (아마), who might die of thirst and starvation if not tended to immediately. Kyungha flies to Jeju, and journey's to Inseon's house amidst a blizzard. She reminisces about her time with Inseon. One time, Inseon revealed to Kyungha that as a teenager, she ran away to Seoul as she had begun to despise her single mother. She was met with an accident and almost died. When she opened her eyes in the hospital, her mother was sitting by her side. During this time, her mother confided a secret that her village had been massacred by police and soldiers, and that only she and her eldest sister survived, as they had been away.

By the time Kyungha reaches Inseon’s village, it’s already dark. On her way to Inseon’s house, Kyugha loses her way, falls into a dry stream and passes out. Once she regains her consciousness, she rushes to Inseon’s house only to find that Ama is already dead. She places Ama in a tin box and buries her.

There’s a power outage in the village due to the blizzard. This means the boiler heating the house can’t be operated. In the freezing cold, Kyungha begins to hallucinate. The line between reality and imagination blurs. Ama, the dead bird, returns to its cage. Inseon miraculously appears in the house as well. She shows Kyungha archival material she has been gathering on the Jeju Massacre. It’s revealed that Inseon’s uncle went into hiding during the massacre and was later captured and sent to a penitentiary. He was later killed and buried in a coal mine. Inseon’s mother spent years searching for his remains.

The novel concludes with Inseon's vanishing, leaving Kyungha to ponder if her entire experience was a hallucination as she lay dying in the dry stream or as she froze to death inside Inseon’s house.

== Jeju massacre ==
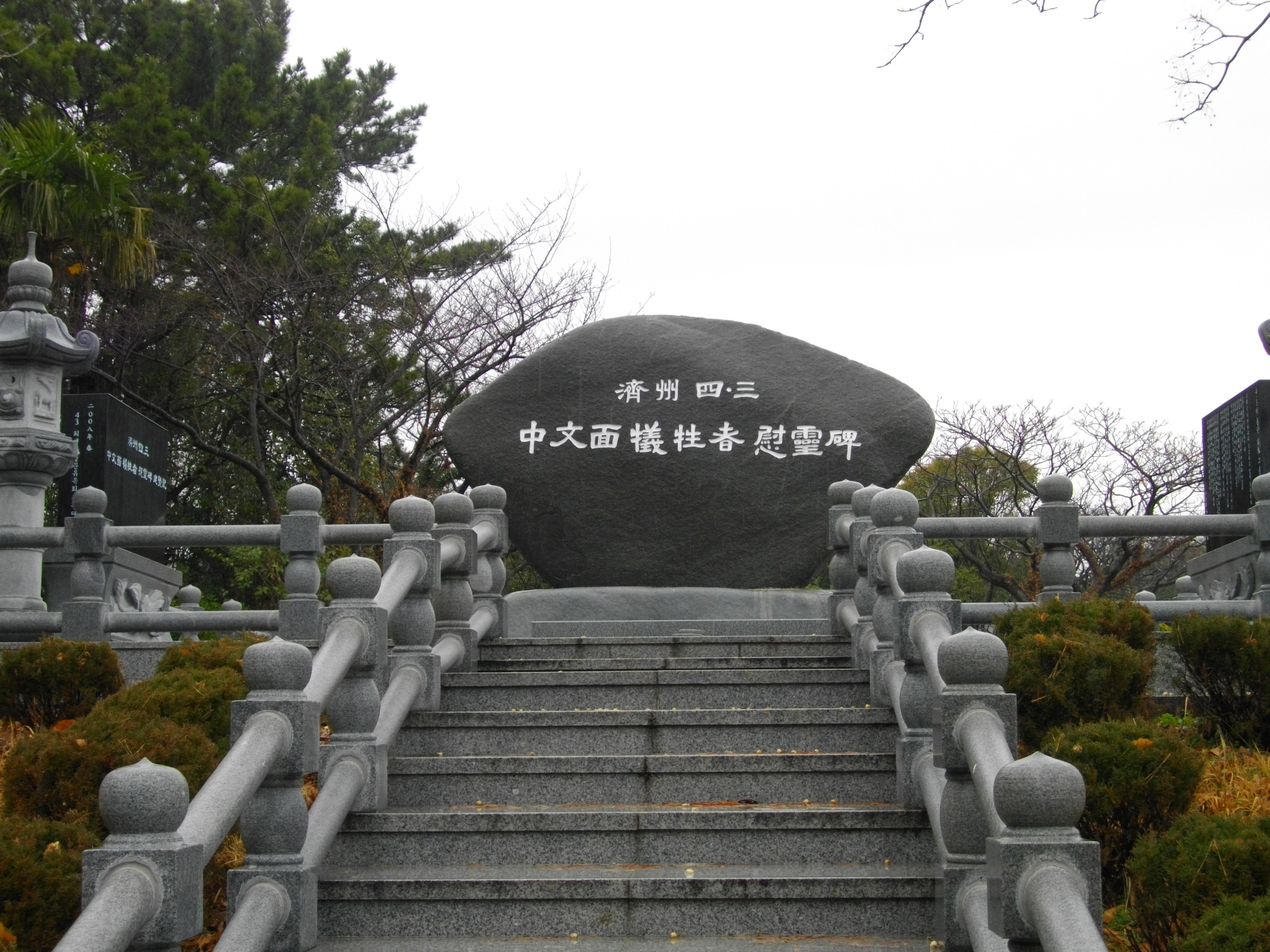
A monument to the victims of the Jeju massacre at Jungmun Saekdal Beach

=== History ===
Immediately after World War II and Korean liberation from the Empire of Japan, the United States moved to establish rule on Jeju Island through the newly formed United States Army Military Government in Korea which intended to prevent the rise of communism. As a result, the government's restrictive, sometimes militant policies led to social and political unrest. In particular, on March 1, 1947, Jeju citizens demonstrated on an anniversary of the March First Movement, leading to an incident of police brutality in which six people were shot and killed. Through early 1948, including on April 3, 1948, communist rebels ushered in a wave of violence across Jeju Island which the ruling government failed to intervene on. In addition, massive protests—including violent actions by right-wing militants—had been forming against an upcoming United States-run election on May 10 that would potentially establish the First Republic of Korea. The republic ultimately formed after May, and afterward, the newly elected Syngman Rhee moved to militarily suppress rebel violence on Jeju Island with support from the United States. Violence on the island thus worsened by 1949. Historians have discussed the true death toll of the Jeju massacre, with estimates in the tens of thousands of lives.

=== Novel ===
We Do Not Part, mostly taking place on Jeju Island decades after the Jeju massacre, makes mention of the island's history as the protagonist, Kyungha, travels through it on behalf of her friend, Inseon. The book also alludes to the violence of the Manchukuo Imperial Army, the Bodo League massacre, and the involvement of South Korea during the Vietnam War. In her lecture delivered as a laureate of the Nobel Prize in Literature, Han stated,

Whereas, until the autumn of 2021, when We Do Not Part was published, I had considered these two problems to be the ones at my core: Why is the world so violent and painful? And yet how can the world be this beautiful? For a long time, I believed that the tension and internal struggle between these sentences was the driving force behind my writing.

Han's work as a novelist has historically attempted to approach various incidents of violence in South Korea's history after the Second World War. Her novel, Human Acts, similarly concerned the legacy of the Gwangju Uprising. In The Yale Review, following Han's awarding of the 2024 Nobel Prize in Literature, writer and professor Yung In Chae stated, regarding this novel and Han's others:

This is the power of Han Kang: With little more than paper and ink, she acts as a conduit for the memories of generations that suffered state violence, passing them on to generations that inherited these traumas but not necessarily the long-suppressed facts beneath them. She makes that pain legible, indelible, meaningful.

== Production ==
After writing Human Acts, Han experienced a series of "haunting" nightmares involving countless dark tree trunks, set against a snowy landscape that was being swallowed by the sea. She stumbled upon Jeju and its history during her attempts to interpret these images, eventually concluding that they were a metaphor for "time and remembrance". Han stated that she worked on the novel over the course of seven years and occasionally expressed fears to her editor that she would not be able to finish the book due to its heavy topics. She then stated that completing it was her "happiest moment".

We Do Not Part has undergone several different titles prior to its English translation. Many English, Korean, and French publications have referred to the book as I Do Not Bid Farewell. After winning the Prix Médicis for Foreign Literature in 2023, Han stated that the English translation would be published under the same name as the French translation, Impossibles Adieux, or Impossible Goodbyes. In an interview with the Nobel Foundation, Han referred to the book both by its official English title as well as I Do Not Bid Farewell and Impossible Goodbyes.

On November 10, 2024, an excerpt of the English translation appeared in The New Yorker, titled "Heavy Snow".

== Critical reception ==
=== Korean ===
Son Yun-seo wrote, for Sideview, that Han was able to powerfully articulate the Jeju massacre as an unforgettable tragedy that still deserved attention in the present day. In particular, Son drew a connection between Inseon's constant pricking of her finger to keep its nerves alive with the bigger picture of constantly never forgetting to mourn the lives lost in the Jeju massacre.

Sanjini Publishing House observed two of the book's strongest points as being the Jeju massacre but also Han's attention to the image of snow. The reviewer argued that snow was used in order to join past and present in various scenes of the book including Kyungha's snow-covered face upon falling unconscious, as well as Inseon's family members removing snow from corpses to identify them. Ultimately, the reviewer concluded that the novel, like Han's other novels, exposed South Korea's complicated relationship to historical violence.

A reviewer at Sungkyunkwan University stated that the book's purpose was not to directly show the events of the Jeju massacre but rather to convey its horror through characters like Inseon's family members—though, to the reviewer, the events still proved to be horrific even through indirect storytelling.

After Han's awarding of the 2024 Nobel Prize in Literature, South Korean sales of We Do Not Part, as well as Han's other novels, skyrocketed. Online retailer Yes24 specifically reported a "9000-fold increase" in sales of We Do Not Part following the Nobel Foundation's announcement. Bookstores initially struggled to keep up with demand, thus placing the novel on backorder, and many copies were subsequently sold on secondhand websites with marked up prices.

=== French ===
Thierry Clermont, writing for Korean Literature Now, stated "Impossibles Adieux is an entrancing work, one that casts a subtle but hypnotic spell... In its pages we find lessons in comradeship, friendship, an acknowledgement of what is kept and lost between generations, as well as the importance and burden of that transmission—and of love, which can also be a source of 'terrible pain.'" He then compared Han's writing style to that of Yasunari Kawabata and W. G. Sebald and observed the novel's "strange and sometimes disturbing atmosphere, a kind of gentle, muffled space between fantasy and reality... all sorts of images and dreams."

=== English ===
In a starred review, Kirkus Reviews called the book "A mysterious novel about history and friendship offers no easy answers" and stated "Even through the veil of translation, the quiet intricacy of the author’s prose glitters throughout" with particular attention to Han's descriptions of snow. The reviewer also mentioned Han's subtle interweaving of Korean history, in particular its history of violence, as the protagonist Kyungha makes her journey to a Jeju Island village on behalf of her friend Inseon.

Also in a starred review, Publishers Weekly called the book "an indelible exploration of Korea’s historical traumas" in its tackling of the Jeju massacre, which took place from 1948 to 1949, and remarked on the "dreamy yet devastating prose" rendered by Han and translated by e. and Morris. Ultimately, the reviewer concluded it was "a meticulously rendered portrait of friendship, mother-daughter love, and hope in the face of profound loss. Han is at the top of her game."

Many publications, like The Atlantic and The Boston Globe, remarked on Han's further tackling of South Korean history in a similar fashion to Human Acts. Leigh Haber, writing for the Los Angeles Times, called We Do Not Part an "exquisite and profoundly disquieting latest novel" and found "no answers" in Han's mysterious, eerie, and haunting narrative. Haber also observed that "Han's prose is translucent, shot through with poetic turns" and found a "reportorial tone" in the sections where Inseon's narrates her family's experiences of the Jeju massacre. People's World lauded Han's mention of the American involvement in the Jeju massacre, writing: "This novel not only reveals the emotional toll that Human Acts took on the author but also deepens and expands on the theme of government aggression, torture, and widespread killings."

Hannah Bae, writing for Datebook, observed Han's interplay between reality and dream, life and death, and past and present through "leaps between narrators, time, place and states of being." Bae particularly observed Han's recollection of the Jeju massacre through Inseon's family background and Kyungha's investigation of it, concluding that "The fragility of the human body—and human society—is a recurring theme in Han’s work, and 'We Do Not Part' furthers her exploration."

== Lists and accolades ==
Many English-language publications in the west highly anticipated the release of We Do Not Part, as it marked Han's first English translation since her awarding of the 2024 Nobel Prize in Literature. Book Riot predicted that the Nobel Prize would instantly make Han's next book—We Do Not Part in this case—one of the biggest books of 2025.

The New York Times, the South China Morning Post, Elle, and many other publications placed the novel on their recommended reading lists for 2025. Fashion Journal and Scary Mommy called it one of the most anticipated, exciting book releases in 2025. The Korea Times mentioned it in their list of books comprising the "wave of Korean literature" to hit English-language markets in 2025. The novel won the 2025 National Book Critics Circle Award for Fiction.

== See also ==
- 2024 Nobel Prize in Literature
- The Vegetarian
- Human Acts
- The White Book
- Greek Lessons
