= Bandi (writer) =

Pseudonymous North Korean writer (born 1950)

- Born: 1950 (age 75–76); China
- Occupation: Writer
- Writing career
- Pen name: Bandi
- Language: Korean
- Genre: Short story
- Literary movement: Dissidence

Korean name
- Hangul: 반디
- Lit.: firefly
- RR: Bandi
- MR: Pandi

Bandi (Korean: 반디; lit. 'firefly'; born 1950) is the pseudonym used by an anonymous North Korean writer.

Bandi was born in 1950 in China to Korean parents who had moved there fleeing the Korean War. Bandi grew up in China before the family moved back to North Korea. In the 1970s, Bandi managed to publish some of his early writing in North Korean publications.

After the death of Kim Il Sung in 1994 and the hardship that followed, Bandi lost several people close to him to the famine and defections. These developments made Bandi disillusioned with the North Korean system and he started to write dissident literature. The opportunity to publish his dissident writing presented itself when Bandi's friend from Hamhung defected to China. Although the friend could not risk taking the manuscripts with her, she promised that she would find a way to bring them abroad. Several months later, a man previously unknown to Bandi came to see him and passed him a note from the friend, asking Bandi to give the man his manuscripts. With the help of this messenger, Bandi's work made its way to South Korea, where it was published.

In North Korea, Bandi is a member of the country's Korean Writers' Alliance and writes for its publications. Bandi still lives in North Korea. Although he has expressed willingness to defect, he can not do so because he has family in the country.

== Works ==
=== The Red Years ===
Bandi's collection of political poems, The Red Years (Korean: 붉은세월; Hanja: 붉은歲月), was published in South Korea in January 2018. The English version, translated by Heinz Insu Fenkl, was published by Zed Books in August 2019.

=== The Accusation ===
Bandi's short story collection, The Accusation (고발; 告發), was smuggled out of the country and published in Seoul in May 2014. When a close relative told Bandi that she planned to leave North Korea, Bandi asked her to take along the 750-page manuscript. The relative promised to send it out once she had escaped. When she was arrested by Chinese border troops, she was helped by Do Hee-yun, a human rights worker from South Korea. Through her, Do learned about Bandi and the manuscript. In 2013, a Chinese friend recruited by Do eventually smuggled out Bandi's manuscript while visiting North Korean relatives. The manuscript was hidden between works on former leaders Kim Il Sung and Kim Jong Il. The poems by Bandi were also smuggled out at the same time that deal with the Kim Jong Il era. The luggage was x-rayed but not hand-searched at the border. Do Hee-youn said: "It doesn't deal with political prison camps, or public executions, human rights issues. It shows normal life of North Korea citizens and it is very frightening. This book shows that they live like slaves." South Korean publishers seek to keep Bandi's identity a secret. To protect his identity, they have deliberately added biographical misinformation into his stories and altered names of people and places. All international publishers agree that behind the pseudonym "Bandi", there is a real author living in North Korea. If this is true, The Accusation is the first North Korean literary work by an author that still lives in North Korea that has been published outside the country.

To Hui-un, the leader of a North Korean defectors' NGO, compares him to Aleksandr Solzhenitsyn who smuggled his manuscripts out of the Soviet Union. Heinz Insu Fenkl, a Korean translator and a professor of English and Asian Studies at SUNY New Paltz, commented on the book, "His stories reminded me of the Soviet era—a lot of satirical fiction that was published by samizdat, the underground publishing venues there. The tone of those stories—there's a kind of pessimism. It's like a world view." American journalist Barbara Demick, who has reported on the country for many years, said, "I find it hard to believe that this was written by somebody in North Korea". She speculated that these stories could be written by a defector. According to her experience, it is hard to recognize the regime's internal contradictions for most North Koreans until they have spent a large amount of time outside the country. Lydia Lim, a student of Korean literature at Princeton University, concluded that the stories had indeed been written by an official state writer living in North Korea, based on the assessments of the "somewhat obscure locations" referenced in the work by several North Korean defectors, and the idiosyncrasies of Bandi's word choices. The copyright of the book is owned jointly by Bandi and Happy Unification Road, Do's organization. The latter controls 50% of the royalties.

The Accusation, comprising seven stories set in the 1990s around the time of death of Kim Il Sung, was published in English and many other languages beginning in 2017. It was published by Grove Press in the USA and by Serpent's Tail in the UK and Commonwealth (excluding Canada). In Canada, the book was published by House of Anansi Press. The English edition was translated by British translator Deborah Smith, the co-winner of the Man Booker International Prize in 2016. The original manuscript of The Accusation contains around 200 words that the average South Korean is not familiar with, and Smith's translation was based on the version edited for publication in South Korea. The English version of The Accusation was listed among 75 Notable Translations of 2017 by World Literature Today.

According to Do Hee-yun, Bandi knows that the book has been published internationally through listening to South Korean radio. Do had also sent someone to meet Bandi, showing him a picture of the book on a mobile phone. The book has been published in 20 countries. The book has been very well received in the US, according to Morgan Entrekin, the editor of American edition.

Do reported in January 2018 that he lost contact with Bandi, but that there was no evidence that Bandi is in danger.

The work has been a bestseller in France and South Korea.

== See also ==
- Ahn Chol – pseudonymous North Korean documentarist
- James Church – pseudonymous Western novelist writing on North Korea
- North Korean literature
