= Children of the Secret State =

- Directed by: Carla Garapedian
- Produced by: Carla Garapedian
- Starring: Ahn Chol; Joe Layburn; Anna Roberts
- Edited by: Mel Quigley
- Release date: 2000
- Country: United Kingdom
- Language: English

Children of the Secret State is a documentary film about homeless North Korean orphans, released in 2000. It was shot by a UK film duo in conjunction with underground North Korean cameramen.

== Synopsis ==
The movie opens with a clip of orphan children by Ahn Chol and speaks of the humanitarian situation in the country, and then introduces Ahn Chol, who has provided the covertly filmed footage of the children. Joe Layburn, who also narrates the movie, and his camerawoman, Anna Roberts, are then introduced, on their way into Pyongyang. Posing as tourists, they are to get an official tour of the country. Joe Layburn states that Pyongyang is 'like a multimillion-dollar film set' and that the atmosphere is 'eerie'. The movie shows the empty streets and unused fun fair and hotels, as well as the well cared-for 'children of the elite', whom he contrasts with footage of starving orphans filmed by Ahn Chol.

Layburn and Roberts then travel across the border to China to rendezvous with Ahn Chol and document the border and border town, using their own footage and interviews and the footage provided by Ahn Chol. Ahn Chol, who planned to meet up with the couple at the border, fails to turn up, but Layburn proceeds to interview refugees who have fled into China from North Korea. He then heads for South Korea and makes more interviews. They also interview a man who has fled a factory complex, as well as a former North Korean prison guard. These interviews cover the well-guarded Chinese-North Korean border, the starvation in North Korea, and hostels where, according to Layburn and the children interviewed, (paraphrased) 'orphan children are deliberately left to die'.

He also states that the factories, and most industry, in the country have stopped running - this is later referred to by Layburn as (paraphrased) 'the crisis in the North Korean economy'. An interviewed farmer who states that most North Korean food-producing farms have been made to produce opium for the profit of party officials, and several refugees speak of inhuman treatment in North Korea's prison camps.

By the end of the movie, the fate of Ahn Chol was still undetermined, but it was later revealed that he eventually managed to escape, and that he still films in North Korea.

== See also ==
- Human rights in North Korea
