= Vegetarian (film) =

- Sundance film poster
- Hangul: 채식주의자
- RR: Chaesikjuuija
- MR: Ch'aesikchuŭija
- Directed by: Lim Woo-Seong
- Written by: Lim Woo-Seong
- Starring: Chae Min-seo; Kim Hyun-Sung; Kim Yeo-jin
- Cinematography: Kang Chang-bae
- Edited by: Mun In-dae
- Music by: Jeong Yong-jin
- Production company: Blue Tree Pictures
- Distributed by: Sponge
- Release dates: October 9, 2009 (Busan); February 18, 2010 (South Korea)
- Running time: 113 minutes
- Country: South Korea
- Language: Korean
- Box office: ₩26,459,000

Vegetarian (Korean: 채식주의자) is a 2009 South Korean erotic body horror drama film directed by Lim Woo-Seong based on the 2007 same-titled novel by Han Kang. The film debuted at the 14th Busan International Film Festival on October 8, 2009, and was later released in South Korea on February 18, 2010. In January 2010, it was invited to the World Cinema Narrative Competition at the 2010 Sundance Film Festival.

Justin Chang, writing for Variety, said, "Body horror and body art are conjoined in the tastefully kinky" film, which is a "tonally extreme portrait of a woman who swears off meat before retreating into a literally vegetative state". He wrote that the film is "an audacious if borderline risible psychodrama".

== Cast ==
- Chae Min-seo as Young-Hye
- Kim Hyun-sung as Min-Ho
- Kim Yeo-jin as Ji-Hye
