= The Accusation (book) =

Short story collection by Bandi

The Accusation (Korean: 고발) is a short story collection by Bandi.

== Background ==
Bandi wrote it on brown paper, starting in 1989 and ending in 1995. He asked a relative of his, who was illegally leaving North Korea, to smuggle it out of North Korea, but she declined as she feared retribution from North Korean authorities if she was caught. In 2012 she was captured by authorities in China, so an activist named Do Hee-youn paid the bribes to free her so she could move to South Korea. When Do learned about the manuscript he arranged for it to be discreetly taken out of the country, which it was in 2013. A China-based ethnic Korean was the go-between contact and had a cover story as a tourist.

== Content ==
There are seven short stories, all depicted as taking place in the 1990s, in the collection.

"City of Specters" depicts the life of Gyeong-hee, who has a management position in Pyongyang and whose son has psychological difficulties when seeing images of Karl Marx. Thu-Huong Ha of Quartz called this story a "stand-out".

In "So Near, Yet So Far" a man does not have paperwork giving him permission to travel within the country. He travels illicitly so he can see his mother, who has a terminal condition.

The story "Life of a Swift Steed" depicts how optimistic ex-wrestler Seol Yong-su is destroyed by his tending to an elm tree.

In "Pandemonium" a woman named Mrs. Oh encounters Kim Il Sung, then the North Korean leader, after leaving a train station that was closed due to the leader's arrival. Publishers Weekly described it as "the most cutting" of the works.

A narrative on how the collection was discreetly taken out of North Korea is in the endnote, authored by Kim Seong-dong.

== Release ==
In 2014 Chogabje.com published it in South Korea. Prior to that point Do tried and failed to find a South Korean publisher as Bandi's identity was not verified by them and Do wished to keep Bandi safe.

Significant attention began after the book's publication in France in 2016.

The book was published in English by Grove Atlantic, with Deborah Smith as the translator.

As this is a dissident work, it was never released in North Korea.

== Reception ==
Barbara Zitwer, who serves as Bandi's literary agent, stated that the volume for pre-emptive book offers was "immediate and stunning" to the point where she had remained at her desk for a long period of time.

=== Reviews ===
Ha stated that overall the work "is a dramatic page-turner" though she criticized the one-dimensional nature of many characters and the overly "formal" writing in the translation.

Kirkus Reviews argued that the book had importance for "journalistic and sociological" reasons and that it was "an important document of witness", but argued that it lacked "inventiveness" that is seen in South Korean literature.

Publishers Weekly described the contents as "uncompromising".

== Legacy ==
Kim Kwang-jin described it as "North Korea’s Solzhenitsyn".
