= Ahn Chol =

Pseudonymous North Korean freelance journalist

- Born: 1971 or 1972 (age 53–54)
- Known for: Children of the Secret State

Korean name
- Hangul: 안철
- RR: An Cheol
- MR: An Ch'ŏl

Ahn Chol (Korean: 안철; born 1971 or 1972) is the pseudonym of a North Korean freelance journalist who shot the footage for the film Children of the Secret State, a movie about the condition of orphans in North Korea. He won the Rory Peck Award in 2001 for his work.

== Life ==
Ahn Chol initially released a VHS of the Jangmadang in Hoeryeong in September 1998. Ahn Chol first spoke with the Korean press in September 1998, to the newspaper Hankyoreh. In the interview he spoke about the footage he leaked of Kotjebis, which was included in Korean Broadcasting System's 1998 documentary. He smuggled the videotape out of North Korea by hiding it inside a pack of cigarettes. Ahn Chol revealed he was a worker in a factory while living in North Korea and defected from North Korea in 1997, having lost his parents and relatives during the famine. He risked going back to capture the aforementioned footage.

== See also ==
- Bandi (writer) - North Korean pseudonymous writer
