= An Dohyeon =

South Korean poet (born 1961)

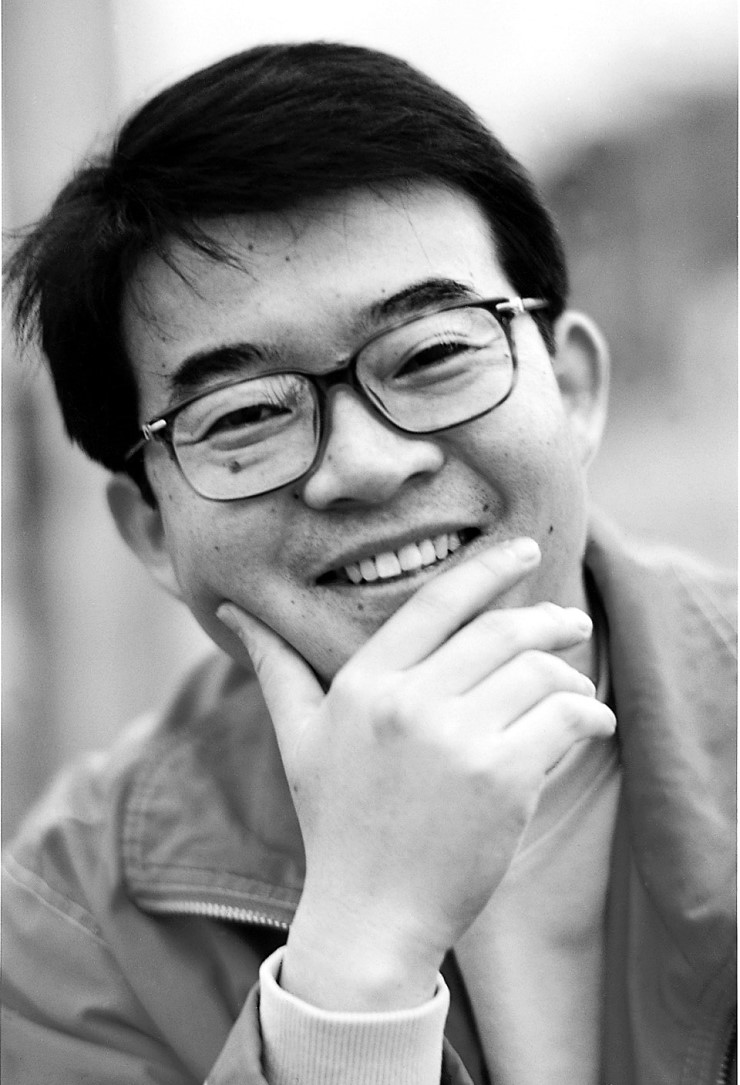
- Born: December 15, 1961 (age 64); Yecheon, North Gyeongsang Province, South Korea
- Occupations: poet; university professor

Korean name
- Hangul: 안도현
- Hanja: 安度昡
- RR: An Dohyeon
- MR: An Tohyŏn

An Dohyeon (Yeocheon, Korea, 1961) is a South Korean poet and university professor. He was Born in Yecheon, Gyeongsangbuk-do in 1961, he made his literary debut in 1984 when his poem won the Dong-A Ilbo New Year's Literary Contest. He has published poetry collections such as 'Jeon Bong-jun Going to Seoul', 'Bonfire', 'I Want to Go to You', 'The Discovery of Ando-hyun', 'Miscellaneous Essays', Such a Thing, and Baekseok's Criticism. The fairy tale for adults such as Salmon, which has been printed over 100 times, has been translated and published overseas in 15 languages. He has won awards including the Seokjeong Poetry Literature Award, Sowol Poetry Literature Award, Nojak Literature Award, Isu Literature Award, Yun Dong-ju Award, and Baekseok Literature Award, and is currently a professor in the Department of Creative Writing at Dankook University.

== Biography ==
An Dohyeon was born in 1961 in Yecheon, North Gyeongsang Province. While in high school, he joined the creative writing club 'Taedonggi Literary Society', coming to know fellow writers such as Hong Seung-woo, Seo Jeong-yoon, Park Deok-gyu, Kwon Tae-hyeon, Ha Eung-baek, and Lee Jeong-ha. He received many awards such as various writing contests and creative writing competitions across the country including the 'Hakwon Literary Award'. In 1980 he entered Wonkwang University (Iksan) to study Korean literature, and he was also active as a member of Guksi, a literary communication journal that was being published in Daegu, along with writers Park Gi-young, Park Sang-bong, and Jang Jung-il. He began his literary career as his poem "Nakdong River" (낙동강) won the [Daegu Maeil Shinmun's New Writer Contest in 1981, and his poem "Jeon Bong-jun Goes to Seoul" (서울로 가는 전봉준) won The Dong-A Ilbo's New Writer Contest in 1984.

He started his career in education as he became a Korean language teacher at Iri Middle School in February 1985, but he was fired from Iri Middle School in August 1989 for having joined the Korean Teachers and Education Workers Union (KTU). Afterwards, until February 1994 he worked at the Iri Iksan branch of the KTU, and was also active as a member of the 'Society of Educational Creative Writing' with Kim Jinkyung, Do Jong-hwan, Bae Chang-hwan, Jo Jae-do, Jeong Yeong-sang, Jo Seong-sun, and Jo Hyeon-seol. In March 1994 he was transferred to Sanseo High School in Jangsu County, North Jeolla Province, but he resigned from teaching in February 1997, and turned to writing full-time. Afterwards, he received a master's degree and a doctorate degree in creative writing at Dankook University's Graduate School. He is currently a creative writing professor at Woosuk University.

== Writing ==
An Dohyeon's poetry is rooted in traditional lyric poetry. He is seen as a poet that depicts the reality of the nation and society with fine sensitivity beyond personal levels, despite the fact that he uses personal experiences as the base of his poetry. He published various poetry collections: Jeon Bong-jun Goes to Seoul (서울로 가는 전봉준; 1985), which lyrically depicts life and history from a perspective of youthful innocence; Modakbul (모닥불 The Bonfire; 1989), which contains introspection into the loneliness and the reality of surrounding life; Geuriun yeowoo (그리운 여우 The Longing Fox; 1997), which deals with issues of the time period and inner conflict; and Badatga woocheguk (바닷가 우체국 The Post Office By the Sea; 1999), which deals with rather average thing such as a post office by the sea and a countryside barber shop in sympathetic and romantic way. He has also published Badatga woocheguk (바닷가 우체국 The Post Office By the Sea; 2003), Neo-ege garyeogo gangeul mandeuleotda (너에게 가려고 강을 만들었다 I Made a River To Go To You; 2004), Amugeotdo anin geot-e daehayeo (아무것도 아닌 것에 대하여 On Something That is Nothing; 2005), and Ganjeolhage cham cheoleopsi (간절하게 참 철없이 Desperately Naïve; 2008). For fiction, he has written The Salmon Who Dared to Leap Higher (연어; 1996), which depicts a salmon's return to its birthplace as a story of struggle of growth and the pain of love.

An Dohyeon is a poet who has expressed romantic emotions with excellent realism based on a clear poetic mind. His poetry has been praised as showing clear lyricism that arouses originality with poetic language that is universal and can be easily read. The poet wrote mainly about the sorrow of poverty-ridden life until the early 90s. After the late 90s, he distanced himself from direct depiction of reality, and started to explore into nature and the simple life. His recent poetry collections show that such exploration is enabling him to go to a level that makes poetic introspection on such 'relationships' possible.

== Works ==
=== Poetry collections ===
- Jeon Bong-jun Goes to Seoul (서울로 가는 전봉준), Minumsa, 1985.
- Modakbul (모닥불 The Bonfire), Changbi, 1989.
- Geudae-ege gago sipda (그대에게 가고 싶다 I Want to Go to You), Pureunsup, 1991.
- Oeropgo nopgo Sseul-sseulhan (외롭고 높고 쓸쓸한 Lonely, High, and Desolate), Munhakdongne, 1994.
- Geuriun yeowoo (그리운 여우 The Longing Fox), Changbi, 1997.
- Badatga woocheguk (바닷가 우체국 The Post Office By the Sea), Munhakdongne, 1999.
- Amugeotdo anin geot-e daehayeo (아무것도 아닌 것에 대하여 On Something That is Nothing), Hyundae Munhak Books, 2001.
- Neo-ege garyeogo gangeul mandeuleotda (너에게 가려고 강을 만들었다 I Made a River To Go To You), Changbi, 2004.
- Ganjeolhage cham cheoleopsi (간절하게 참 철없이 Desperately Naïve), Changbi, 2008.
- Bukhang (북항 The North Port), Munhakdongne, 2012.

=== Essay collections ===
- Oero-ul ttaeneun oero-wohaja (외로울 때는 외로워하자 Let's Be Lonely When We're Lonely), Samtoh, 1998.
- Na daesin kkotip-I sseun I pyeonjireul (나 대신 꽃잎이 쓴 이 편지를 This Letter That A Flower Petal Wrote Instead of Me), Hamunsa, 1999.
- Geu Jakgo hachaneun geotdeul-e daehan aechak (그 작고 하찮은 것들에 대한 애착 Attachment to Things That are Small and Trivial), Namu Books, 1999.
- Dangsineul saranghari ttaemunipnida (당신을 사랑하기 때문입니다 Because I Love You), Iga Publishing, 2000.
- Ireumi raniraneun yeoja-aega itseotda (이름이 란이라는 여자애가 있었다 There was a Girl by the Name of Ran), Dong-A Ilbo, 2000.
- Samgwa jukeum iyagi (삶과 죽음 이야기 Story of Life and Death), Sarangui saem, 2008.
- Chiyuwa hoebok (치유와 회복 Healing and Recovery), Heaven, 2011.
- Nega bogo sipeoseo barami buleotda (네가 보고 싶어서 바람이 불었다 The Wind Blew Because I Wanted to See You), Doors, 2012.
- Naneun dangsinipnida (나는 당신입니다 I Am You), Feel Books, 2014.
- An Dohyeonui balgyeon (안도현의 발견 The Discovery of An Dohyeon), Hani Books, 2014.
- Saram Saram (사람 사람 People People), Shinwon Books, 2015.
- Jabmun (잡문 The Essay), The Story House, 2015.
- Geureon il (그런 일 That Kind of Thing), Samin, 2016.

=== Children's poetry books ===
- Gireogineun chagapda (기러기는 차갑다 The Seagull is Cold), Munhakdongne Children, 2016.

=== Children's books ===
- The Salmon Who Dared to Leap Higher (연어), Munhakdongne, 1996.
- Gwangye (관계 Relationship), Munhakdongne, 1998.
- Jjajangmyeon (짜장면 Black Bean Sauce Noodles) Yolimwon, 2000.
- Nabi (나비 Butterfly), Lizaenbook, 2005.
- Homireul meokeun jwi (호미를 먹은 쥐 The Mouth That Ate a Hoe), Parangsae, 2008.
- Osoriwa byeoruk (오소리와 벼룩, The Badger and the Flea), Miseghy, 2010).
- Yeoneo iyagi (연어 이야기 The Story of a Salmon), Munhakdongne, 2010.
- Sigol kkoma manboki (시골 꼬마 만복이 Manbok the Country Boy), Hansol Soobook, 2014.

=== Critical biographies ===
- Baekseokpyeongjeon (백석평전), Dasan Books, 2014.
- Jeon Bong-jun (전봉준), Sanha, 2016.

=== Works in English ===
- The Salmon Who Dared to Leap Higher (Deborah Smith, tr.)
- Poems by Ahn Do-Hyun (Brother Anthony, tr.)

== Awards ==
- 1996 Poetry and Poetics Award for New Poet
- 1998 13th Sowol Poetry Prize
- 2002 1st Nojak Literature Prize
- 2005 12th Isu Literature Prize
- 2007 2nd Yun Dongju Literature Award

== See also ==
- Korean poetry
- List of Korean-language poets
