= James Church =

Pseudonymous writer

James Church is the pseudonym of an American author of six detective novels featuring a North Korean policeman, "Inspector O".

Church is identified on the back cover of his novels as "a former Western intelligence officer with decades of experience in Asia". He grew up in the San Fernando Valley in the United States, and was over sixty years old in 2009. His name and identity are known in the community of North Korea watchers.

His "Inspector O" novels have been well-received, being noted by Asia specialists for offering "an unusually nuanced and detailed portrait" of North Korean society. A Korea Society panel praised the first book in the series for its realism and its ability to convey "the suffocating atmosphere of a totalitarian state". The Independent and the Washington Post compared the protagonist to Arkady Renko, the Soviet chief inspector in Martin Cruz Smith's Gorky Park, for providing "a vivid window into a mysterious country".

== Works ==
The "Inspector O" series of books are published by Minotaur Books, an imprint of St. Martin's Press, in the United States.

- A Corpse in the Koryo. 2006. ISBN 978-0-312-35208-0.
- Hidden Moon. St. Martin's Minotaur. 2007. ISBN 978-0-312-35209-7.
- Bamboo and Blood. Minotaur Books. 2008. ISBN 978-0-312-37291-0.
- Church, James (2010). The Man with the Baltic Stare. St. Martin's Press. ISBN 978-0-312-37292-7.
- A Drop of Chinese Blood. 2012. ISBN 9780312550639.
- Church, James (2016). The Gentleman from Japan. St. Martin's Publishing. ISBN 978-0-312-61431-7.

== See also ==
- Bandi (writer) - pseudonymous North Korean writer
