= Han Seung-won =

South Korean writer (born 1939)

Han Seung-won (Korean: 한승원; born 1939) is a South Korean writer. He primarily writes about people who struggle against their fate in Jangheung, a county situated off the southern coast of the Korean peninsula where Han himself was born. Han's work tends to have a strong sense of place; his stories are often set in his coastal hometown and contain the local dialect. He is the father of 2024 Nobel laureate for literature, Han Kang.

== Life ==
Han Seung-won was born in Jangheung County, South Korea, in 1939. He is a visiting professor of creative writing at Chosun University. He attended Jangheung Middle School, Jangheung High School, and Seorabeol Art University for creative writing. Han took a course taught by writer Kim Tong-ni and became acquainted with a number of classmates who went on to become writers, including Lee Mun Ku, Park Sang-ryoong, Cho Sehee, and Kim Won il. He made his literary debut in 1966 when he won the Shina Ilbo New Writer's Contest for his short story “Gajeungseureoun bada” (가증스런 바다 Despicable Sea). He began teaching at Jangdongseo Elementary School and has also taught at Kwangyang Middle School and Gwangju Dongshin Middle School.

Han's short story “Mokseon” (목선 Wooden Boat) won a writing contest by Daehan Ilbo in 1968, boosting his literary career. In 1972, he founded Soseol Munhak (“fiction and literature”), an association of writers based in Gwangju, South Korea. Members included Mun Sun-tae, Kim Sin-un, Kang Sun-sik, and Lee Gye-hong. He relocated to Seoul in 1980 and wrote full-time, producing bestsellers such as Aje aje bara-aje (아제아제바라아제 Aje aje bara-aje). The novel was made into a movie.

Over his 50-year career, he has persistently written stories inspired by the shores of his hometown. He moved back to Jangheung in 1997 and has resided there since. His two children, Han Kang and Han Dong-rim, are also writers. Both Han Seung-won and Han Kang have won the Yi Sang Literary Award and Kim Tong-ni Literary Award.

== Writing ==
Han Seung-won's works usually involve characters who are driven mad by desire and struggle against their tragic fate. While these characters express a deep sentiment of han, they are not entirely helpless against fate. Some destroy themselves in a fit of insanity, while others commit sins to fulfill their desires. They become trapped in a vicious cycle of suffering, reinforcing the theme of fate in Han's works.

One of Han's best-known works is the novella Hyebyeonui gilson (해변의 길손 Wanderer on the Shore), which is loosely based on an ancient Korean hero myth. The book spans decades from Japanese colonial rule through the chaotic post-liberation period to the Korean War, modernization, and finally the Gwangju Uprising in the 1980s. The turmoils of modern Korean history is reflected in the tragic life of the protagonist Hwang Du-pyo. In a storyline reminiscent of Cain and Abel, the novel centers around the conflict between Hwang and his little brother, who is smarter and more loved by their parents. Literary critic Wu Han-yong writes: “The tragedy of Hwang Du-pyo’s family originates from his inferiority complex and is correlated to Korean modern history; the tragedy of an individual expands into that of the nation. Another way to understand the novel is to focus on the psychology of its characters. In this kind of reading, one sees how Hwang’s bitter sense of inferiority grows as he experiences the tumults of history and how that compromises his integrity.”

Often set in his coastal hometown of Jangheung County, Han's stories have a strong sense of place. The language, people, and environment of his hometown feature heavily in his works. Han has described the sea as “the womb of the universe” and the source of his creative inspiration.

== Works ==
Fiction

1. 『앞산도 첩첩하고』, 창작과비평사, 1977.

Deep is the Mountain Before Me. Changbi, 1977.

2. 『바다의 뿔』, 동화출판공사, 1982.

Horns of the Sea. Donghwa, 1982.

3. 『불의 딸』, 문학과지성사, 1983.

The Daughter of Fire. Moonji, 1983.

4. 『그 바다 끓며 넘치며』, 청한문화사, 1983.

As the Sea Boils Over. Cheonghan Munhwasa, 1983.

5. 『아제아제 바라아제』, 삼성, 1985.

Aje aje bara-aje. Samsung, 1985.

6. 『우리들의 돌탑』, 문학과지성사, 1988.

Our Stone Tower. Moonji, 1988.

7. 『목선』, 시몬출판사, 1989.

Wooden Boat. Simon, 1989.

8. 『왕인의 땅』, 동광출판사, 1989.

The Land of Wani. Donggwang, 1989.

9. 『낙지같은 여자』, 지양사, 1991.

The Woman Like an Octopus. Jiyangsa, 1991.

10. 『아제아제 바라아제2』, 범조사, 1991.

Aje aje bara-aje 2. Beomjosa, 1991.

11. 『아제아제 바라아제3』, 범조사, 1991.

Aje aje bara-aje 3. Beomjosa, 1991.

12. 『내 고향 남쪽 바다』, 청아출판사, 1992.

The Southern Seas, My Hometown. Chunga, 1992.

13. 『새터말 사람들』, 문학과지성사, 1993.

People of the New Settlement. Moonji, 1993.

14. 『시인의 잠』, 문이당, 1994.

The Poet’s Sleep. Munidang, 1994.

15. 『아버지를 위하여』, 문이당, 1995.

For Father. Munidang, 1995.

16. 『목선:한승원 중단편전집1』, 문이당, 1999.

Wooden Boat: Short Stories and Novellas by Han Seung-won. Munidang, 1999.

17. 『아리랑 별곡:한승원 중단편전집2』, 문이당, 1999.

Arirang Song: Short Stories and Novellas by Han Seung-won 2. Munidang, 1999.

18. 『누이와 늑대:한승원 중단편전집3』, 문이당, 1999.

My Sister and the Wolf: Short Stories and Novellas by Han Seung-won 2. Munidang, 1999.

19. 『해변의 길손:한승원 중단편전집4』, 문이당, 1999.

Wanderer on the Shore: Short Stories and Novellas by Han Seung-won 4. Munidang, 1999.

20. 『내 고향 남쪽 바다:한승원 중단편전집5』, 문이당, 1999.

The Southern Seas, My Hometown: Short Stories and Novellas by Han Seung-won 5. Munidang, 1999.

21. 『검은댕기 두루미:한승원 중단편전집6』, 문이당, 1999.

Black-backed Crane: Short Stories and Novellas by Han Seung-won 6. Munidang, 1999.

22. 『화사』, 작가정신, 2001.

Flowering Serpent. Jakkajungsin, 2001.

23. 『초의』, 김영사, 2003.

Choui. Gimmyoung, 2003.

14. 『소설 원효(전3권)』, 비채, 2006.

Wonhyo: A Novel Vol. 1-3. Viche, 2006.

15. 『추사(전2권)』, 열림원, 2007.

Chusa Vol. 1-2. Yolimwon, 2007.

16. 『희망 사진관』, 문학과지성사, 2009.

Photo Studio of Hope. Moonji, 2009.

17. 『보리 닷 되』, 문학동네, 2010.

Five Dwe of Barley. Munhakdongne, 2010.

Poetry

1. 『열애 일기』, 문학과지성사, 1995.

Diary of Passionate Love. Moonji, 1995.

2. 『사랑은 늘 혼자 깨어 있게 하고』, 문학과지성사, 1995.

Love Always Keeps You Awake Alone. Moonji, 1995.

3. 『노을 아래서 파도를 줍다』, 문학과지성사, 1999.

I Picked Up a Wave Under the Sunset. Moonji, 1999.

4. 『달 긷는 집』, 문학과지성사, 2008.

The House That Draws Up the Moon. Moonji, 2008.

=== Works in translation ===
1. Father and Son (English, partial translation)
2. 塔 (Japanese)
3. 叶落彼岸 (Chinese)

== Awards ==
1. 1980: Korean Fiction Award
2. 1983: Korea Literature Prize
3. 1983: Korean Writer's Award
4. 1988: Hyundae Literary Award
5. 1988: Yi Sang Literary Award
6. 1994: Seorabol Literature Prize
7. 1997: Maritime Literature Award Grand Prize
8. 2001: Hyundae Buddhist Literary Prize
9. 2002: Kiriyama Prize Notable Book Award
10. 2006: Dongin Literary Award
11. 2012: Suncheon Literary Award
