= Park Sang-ryung =

South Korean writer (1940–2017)

Park Sang-ryoong
- Born: August 26, 1940 (age 86)
- Writing career
- Language: Korean

Korean name
- Hangul: 박상륭
- Hanja: 朴常隆
- RR: Bak Sangryung
- MR: Pak Sangnyung

Park Sang-ryoong (August 26, 1940 to July 1, 2017) was a South Korean novelist and short story writer. His most famous work is A Study of Death (1975), a novel which describes forty days leading to the death of an unnamed monk. He refers to his work as "Japseol" (잡설) or a talk on everything because his writings all form a large metaphysical musing on the nature of humanity, transcendence, and death. He has a reputation for being a formidable and challenging writer not only because of his exhaustive range of symbolism and allusion, but also because of his complex, experimental style. The work was adapted to film and went to the 1996 Cannes Film Festival where it was shortlisted for Critics Choice. As of 2012, he has published five novels, three short story collections, and one essay collection and is considered one of the most notable Korean authors of his generation.

== Life ==
Park Sang-ryoong was born on 26 August 1940 in Jangsu, Jeollabuk-do. He was the youngest of eight surviving children; one of his elder brothers died when he was four. Because his mother was forty-five when he was born, he had a complex about her mortality. This became more evident after his mother died when he was sixteen. He began making poems in middle school and only became a fiction writer when he could no longer sustain himself by writing only poetry. In 1961, he enrolled in Sorabol Art College to study creative writing. His debut was in 1963 when he published a short story called “Ageldama” in Sasangge. Its success enabled him to publish more stories in this journal. He transferred to Kyunghee University as a political science and international studies major in 1965, but he never attended opting to accept a position at Sasangge in 1967. On the same year, he married Bae Yoo-ja. Then in 1969 invited by his wife, immigrated to Vancouver, Canada. His three daughters were born during this period (Christina, Ondine, and Augustine). Meanwhile, he continued to write and publish in Korean and as an influence in Korean literary circles. He moved back to Korea in 1998 with the intention of permanent settlement, but he continued to travel between Canada and Korea. Park Sang-Ryoong died on July 1, 2017.

== Work ==
=== Subject ===
Park considers his work as writing between novel and religious text in that it seeks to realize how a life can reach Moksha by physical and spiritual evolution. He describes his work as a treatise on "Mwalm"(뫎) which is a compound word for body, speech, and mind. This is an important theme for his work because it signifies the path from the universe of body through the universe of speech to arrive at the universe of mind. Because only humans are capable of belonging to these three universes (for animals lack speech, gods lack body, and nature lacks mind), they are the only ones who can escape from their cycle of life and death and thus bring an end to their suffering. The passage through these universes is what consists of physical and spiritual evolution towards Moksha.

In order to discover what “Mwalm” is, his works venture on themes such as time, the relationship between gods and men, dreams, and nature. Nonetheless, Pravritti and Nivritti are the most predominant themes in them. Park defines Pravritti and Nivritti as progress and withdrawal, or more specifically an idea embodied in Samsara and a frame which embodies Nirvana. In Pravritti or Rūpa, there is no end to time, and so there is no control to violent and lustful cycle of Samsara. On the other hand, Nivritti or Sunyata is an unchanging universe where liberation of soul occurs.

=== Influence ===
His influences are comprehensive because his quest for a way of salvation has led him to recognize many philosophical, religious, mythical, and literary ideas that are relevant to it. His works are most influenced by Nietzsche, Jung, Laozi, Zhuangzi, I Ching, Bardo Thodol, Platform Sutra, Prajnaparamita, Diamond Sutra, Rig Veda, the Bible, Cheondoism, Jainism, Shamanism, Upanishads, the Gateless Gate, Greek mythology, Sumerian mythology, Indian mythology, Korean folklore (including Dangun), Shan Hai Jing, ancient Korean poetry, Yi Sang, Kim So-wol, Korean pansori, Camus, Hesse, T.S. Eliot, Dante, Dostoevsky, Jessie Weston’s work From Ritual to Romance, Mircea Eliade, and The Golden Bough. His works acknowledge these influences by either inserting direct quotations (including their sources) or paraphrasing them in conversational expositions. Park also stated that his spiritual mentors are Milarepa, Nagarjuna, and Padmasambhava.

=== Style ===
Park is known for writing long compound-complex sentences broken only by commas. These sentences range from six to ten lines, unusual trait in Korean literature. Also, characters in his works often speak a modified form of Jeolla dialect and play with grammar, especially closing endings. Often unexplained Chinese characters, ancient Korean words, or obscure terms appear in his work. These stylistic features are interpreted as the author's attempt to overcome the limitation of the Korean language.

== Bibliography ==
- 1971 Collected Stories
- 1973 Yeolmyung-gil (short stories)
- 1975 A Study of Death (Jugeum-ui Han Yeongu, republished in 1986 and 1997 [2 vols.])
- 1986 Yeolmyng-gil (republished version of Collected Stories and Yeolmyung-gil)
- 1990-1994 Chiljo-eoron (4 vols.)
- 1997 Ageldama (uncollected stories)
- 1999 Pyeongsim (short stories)
- 1999 Sanhaegi (essays)
- 2002 A Tree That Hangs a Fruit of Sleep Dreams from Its Roots (Jam-ui Yeolmae-reul Mae-dan Namu-neun Buri-ro Gum-eul Gun-da, short stories)
- 2003 The Path of a Man Who Killed God Was Lonely (Sin-eul Jug-in Ja-ui Haeng-ro Neun Sseulsseul Haetdoda)
- 2005 Soseolbeob
- 2008 Japseolpum

== Awards ==
- 1963 – Best New Writer Prize from Sasangge
- 1999 – 2nd Kim Dong-ri Literature Prize
