= Premio Malaparte =

Italian literarary award for international writers

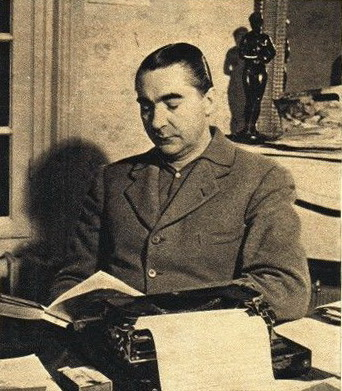
- The award is named after Curzio Malaparte.
- Location: Capri, Italy
- Country: Italy
- Presented by: Incontri Internazionali d'Arte (since 2012)
- Website: http://www.premiomalaparte.it

The Premio Malaparte (lit. 'Malaparte Prize') is an Italian literary award given annually to an international writer. It was created in 1983 by Graziella Lonardi Buontempo, Alberto Moravia and the association Amici di Capri. It is named after the writer and journalist Curzio Malaparte and the prize ceremony is held on Capri. The prize became dormant in 1998 but was reactivated in 2012 after efforts from Gabriella Buontempo, general secretary of the association Incontri Internazionali d'Arte.

The award is considered one of Italy's highest honors for foreign writers and is known for celebrating an "aesthetic sensibility allied with the spirit and role of the island of Capri." Notable winners have included Nobel laureates and international figures such as Saul Bellow (1984), Nadine Gordimer (1985), Susan Sontag (1992), and Han Kang (2017).

== Laureates ==
Year	Writer	Country
1983	Anthony Burgess	United Kingdom
1984	Saul Bellow	Canada and United States
1985	Nadine Gordimer	South Africa
1986	Manuel Puig	Argentina
1987	John le Carré	United Kingdom
1988	Fazil Iskander	Soviet Union
1989	Zhang Jie	China
1990	Václav Havel	Czechoslovakia
1991	Predrag Matvejević	Yugoslavia
1992	Susan Sontag	United States
1993	Michel Tournier	France
1994	Breyten Breytenbach	South Africa
1995	Antonia Susan Byatt	United Kingdom
1998	Isabel Allende	Chile
2012	Emmanuel Carrère	France
2013	Julian Barnes	United Kingdom
2014	Donna Tartt	United States
2015	Karl Ove Knausgård	Norway
2016	Elizabeth Strout	United States
2017	Han Kang	South Korea
2018	Richard Ford	United States
2019	Colm Tóibín	Ireland
2020	Amin Maalouf	France and Lebanon
2021	Yasmina Reza	France
2022	Daniel Mendelsohn	United States
2023	Benjamín Labatut	Chile
2024	Rachel Cusk	United Kingdom
2025	Fernando Aramburu	Spain
