= Han Kang =

South Korean writer (born 1970)

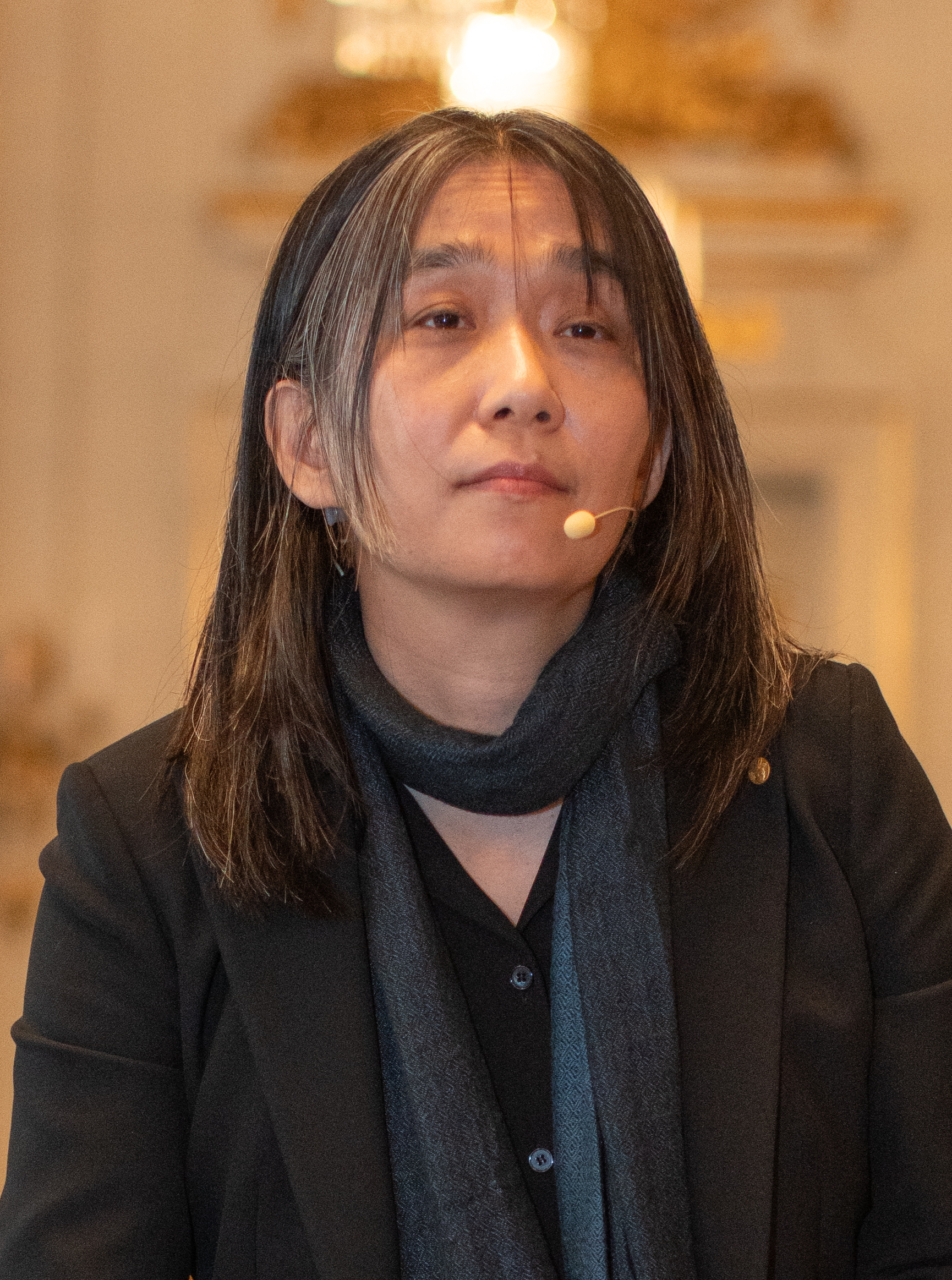
- Han in 2024 during Nobel Week
- Born: 27 November 1970 (age 55); Gwangju, South Korea
- Education: Yonsei University (BA)
- Spouse: Hong Yong-hee (divorced)
- Children: 1
- Parent: Han Seung-won (father)
- Writing career
- Pen name: Han Kang-hyun
- Genre: Fiction
- Notable works: The Vegetarian; Human Acts
- Notable awards: Yi Sang Literary Award (2005; International Booker Prize (2016); Prix Médicis étranger (2023); Nobel Prize in Literature (2024)

Korean name
- Hangul: 한강
- Hanja: 韓江
- RR: Han Gang
- MR: Han Kang
- Website: Official website

Han Kang (Korean: 한강; born 27 November 1970) is a South Korean writer. From 2007 to 2018, she taught creative writing at the Seoul Institute of the Arts. Han rose to international prominence for her novel The Vegetarian, which became the first Korean language novel to win the International Booker Prize for fiction in 2016. Han is the first Asian woman and Korean to be a recipient of the Nobel Prize in Literature, receiving the award in 2024 in recognition of her "intense poetic prose that confronts historical traumas and exposes the fragility of human life".

== Early life and education ==
Han Kang was born on 27 November 1970 in Gwangju, South Korea. According to her father, she is named for the Han River (Korean: 한강; RR: Hangang). Her family is noted for its literary background. Her father is novelist Han Seung-won. They made history as the first father and daughter to both be awarded the Yi Sang Literary Award. Her older brother, Han Dong-rim, is also a novelist, while her younger brother, Han Kang-in, is a novelist and cartoonist.

At the age of nine, Han moved to Suyu-ri in Seoul, when her father quit his teaching job to become a full-time writer, four months before the Gwangju Uprising, a pro-democracy movement that ended in the military's massacre of students and civilians. She first learned about the massacre when she was 12, after discovering at home a secretly circulated memorial album of photographs taken by a German journalist, Jürgen Hinzpeter. This discovery deeply influenced her view on humanity and her literary works.

Han's father struggled to make ends meet with his writing career, which negatively impacted his family. Han later described her childhood as "too much for a little child"; however, being surrounded by books gave her comfort. In 1988, she graduated from Poongmoon Girls' High School, now Poongmoon High School, where she had been a class president. In 1993, Han graduated from Yonsei University, where she majored in Korean language and literature. In 1998, she participated in the University of Iowa International Writing Program for three months with support from the Arts Council Korea.

== Career ==
After graduating from Yonsei University, Han briefly worked as a reporter for the monthly Saemteo magazine. Han's literary career began the same year when five of her poems, including "Winter in Seoul", were featured in the Winter 1993 issue of the quarterly Literature and Society. She made her fiction debut the next year, under the name Han Kang-hyun, when her short story "The Scarlet Anchor" won the New Year's Literary Contest held by the Seoul Shinmun. Her first short story collection, A Love of Yeosu, was published in 1995 and attracted attention for its precise and tightly narrated structure. After the publication, she quit her magazine job to solely focus on writing literature.

In 2007, Han published a book, A Song to Sing Calmly (가만가만 부르는 노래), that was accompanied by a music album. At first she did not intend to sing, but Han Jeong-rim, a musician and music director, insisted that Han Kang record the songs herself. The same year, she started working as a professor in the Department of Creative Writing at the Seoul Institute of the Arts until 2018.

In her college years Han became obsessed with a line of poetry by the Korean modernist poet Yi Sang: "I believe that humans should be plants." She understood Yi's line to imply a defensive stance against the violence of Korea's colonial history under Japanese occupation and took it as an inspiration to write her most successful work, The Vegetarian. The second part of the three-part novel, Mongolian Mark, won the Yi Sang Literary Award. The rest of the series (The Vegetarian and Fire Tree) was delayed by contractual problems.

The Vegetarian was Han's first novel translated into English, although she had already attracted worldwide attention by the time Deborah Smith translated it. The translated work won the International Booker Prize 2016 for both Han and Smith. Han was the first Korean writer to be nominated for the award, and The Vegetarian was the first Korean language novel to win the International Booker Prize for fiction. The Vegetarian was also chosen as one of "The 10 Best Books of 2016" by The New York Times Book Review.

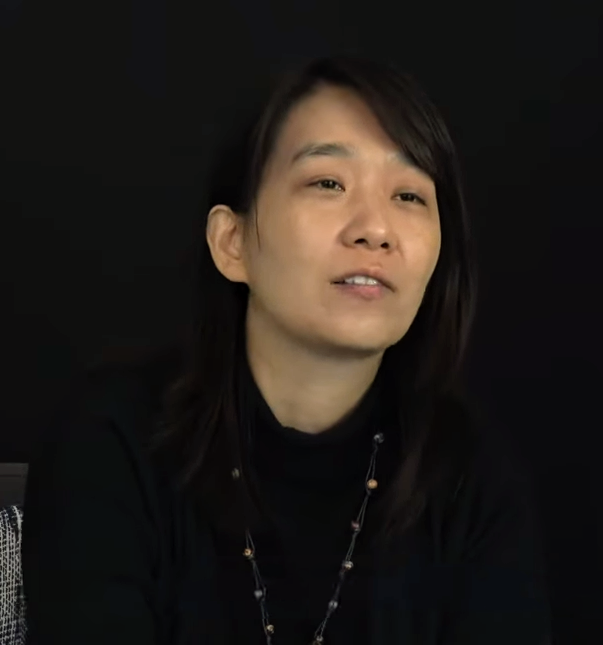
Han Kang in 2017

Han's novel Human Acts was released in January 2016 by Portobello Books. Han received the Premio Malaparte for the Italian translation of Human Acts, Atti Umani, by Adelphi Edizioni, in Italy on 1 October 2017. The English translation of the novel was shortlisted for the 2018 International Dublin Literary Award.

Han's third novel, The White Book, was shortlisted for the 2018 International Booker Prize. An autobiographical novel, it centers on the loss of her older sister, a baby who died two hours after her birth.

Han's novel We Do Not Part was published in 2021. It tells the story of a writer researching the 1948–49 Jeju uprising and its impact on her friend's family. The French translation of the novel won the Prix Médicis Étranger in 2023.

In 2023, Han's fourth full-length novel, Greek Lessons, was translated into English by Deborah Smith and E Yaewon. The Atlantic magazine called it a book in which "words are both insufficient and too powerful to tame".

In 2024, Han's short story "Heavy Snow" was published by the 18 November 2024 issue of The New Yorker.

In 2025, Han was among 414 South Korean writers who were signatories to a petition urging the Constitutional Court of Korea to uphold the impeachment of suspended president Yoon Suk Yeol over his martial law declaration.

== Personal life ==
Han was married to Hong Yong-hee, a literary critic and professor at Kyung Hee Cyber University. In 2024, Han stated that they had been divorced for many years. Han has a son, and they ran a bookstore in Seoul together from 2018 to November 2024, when she stepped down from its management. The bookstore closed in 2026.

Han has said that she suffers from periodic migraines and credits them with "keeping her humble".

== Awards and recognition ==
Han won the Yi Sang Literary Award (2005) for Mongolian Mark (the second part of The Vegetarian), the 25th Korean Novelist Award for her novella Baby Buddha in 1999, the 2000 Today's Young Artist Award from the Korean Ministry of Culture, and the 2010 Dongri Literary Award for The Wind is Blowing.

In 2018, Han became the fifth writer chosen to contribute to Future Library. Katie Paterson, the project's organizer, said that Han had been chosen because she "expands our view of the world". Han delivered the manuscript, Dear Son, My Beloved, in May 2019. In the handover ceremony, she dragged a white cloth through the forest and wrapped it around the manuscript. She explained this as a reference to Korean culture, in which a white cloth is used both for babies and for mourning gowns, describing the event as "like a wedding of my manuscript with this forest. Or a lullaby for a century-long sleep".

Han was elected a Royal Society of Literature International Writer in 2023, recognizing her significant contributions to global literature and the impact of her works beyond South Korea.

The Vegetarian placed 49th in The New York Times's "100 Best Books of the 21st century" in July 2024.

=== Nobel Prize in Literature ===
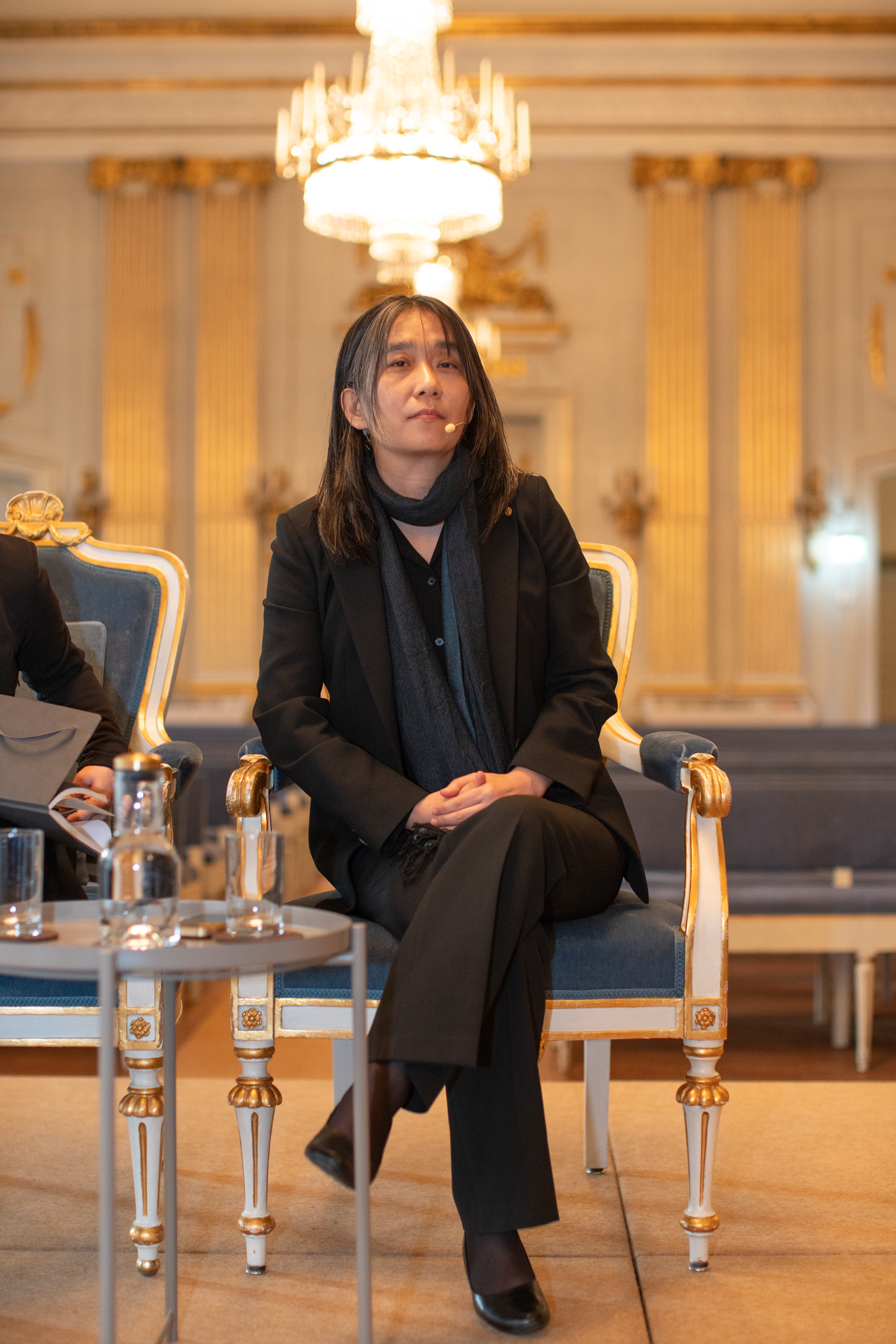
Han Kang at the press conference in Stockholm during the Nobel week in December 2024

In 2024, Han was awarded the Nobel Prize in Literature by the Swedish Academy for her "intense poetic prose that confronts historical traumas and exposes the fragility of human life". This made her the first Korean writer and the first female Asian writer to be awarded the Nobel Prize in Literature. The awarding was widely celebrated in South Korea, while international reactions were mixed. Han herself said she was surprised but honoured by the recognition. Han delivered her Nobel lecture, titled Light and Thread, on 7 December 2024 at the Swedish Academy in Stockholm.

=== Awards ===
- 1999 – Korean Novel Award for Baby Buddha
- 2000 – Korean Ministry of Culture Today's Young Artist Award – Literature Section
- 2005 – Yi Sang Literary Award for Mongolian Mark
- 2010 – Dongri Literary Award for The Wind is Blowing
- 2014 – Manhae Literary Award for Human Acts
- 2015 – Hwang Sun-won Literary Award for While One Snowflake Melts
- 2016 – Yonsei Award for Excellence in Liberal Arts
- 2016 – International Booker Prize for The Vegetarian
- 2017 – Malaparte Prize for Human Acts
- 2018 – Kim Yu-jeong Literary Award for Farewell
- 2018 – San Clemente Literary Prize for The Vegetarian
- 2019 – Inchon Award Media & Culture Section
- 2019 – Future Library Writer of the Year
- 2022 – Daesan Literary Award for We Do Not Part
- 2022 – Kim Man-jung Literary Award for We Do Not Part
- 2023 – Prix Médicis étranger for We Do Not Part
- 2024 – Émile Guimet Prize for Asian Literature for We Do Not Part
- 2024 – Ho-Am Prize in the Arts
- 2024 – Nobel Prize in Literature
- 2024 – Pony Chung Innovation Award
- 2025 – Korea Newspaper Journalists Association by 100 Great Koreans Awards
- 2025 – National Book Critics Circle Award for Fiction
- 2026 – Korea Newspaper Journalists Association by K-Culture 100 Great Koreans Awards

== Works ==
=== Novels ===
- 여수의 사랑 [Love in Yeosu] (in Korean). Moonji. 1995. ISBN 9788932007502.
- 검은 사슴 [Black Deer] (in Korean). Munhakdongne. 1998. ISBN 9788982811333.
- 내 여자의 열매 [My Woman's Fruits] (in Korean). Changbi. 2000. ISBN 9788936436575.
- 그대의 차가운 손 [Your Cold Hands] (in Korean). Moonji. 2002. ISBN 9788932013046.
- 채식주의자 [The Vegetarian] (in Korean). Changbi. 2007. ISBN 9788936433598.
- 바람이 분다, 가라 [The Wind Blows, Go] (in Korean). Moonji. 2010. ISBN 9788932020006.
- 희랍어 시간 [Greek Lessons] (in Korean). Munhakdongne. 2011. ISBN 9788954616515.
- 노랑무늬영원 [Fire Salamander] (in Korean). Moonji. 2012. ISBN 9788932023533.
- 소년이 온다 [A Boy Comes = Human Acts] (in Korean). Changbi. 2014. ISBN 9788936434120.
- 흰 [White = The White Book] (in Korean). Nanda. 2016. ISBN 9788954640718.
- 작별하지 않는다 [We Do Not Part] (in Korean). Munhakdongne. 2021. ISBN 9788954682152.

==== In translation ====
- The Vegetarian. Translated by Deborah Smith. London: Portobello Books. 2015. ISBN 9781846275623.UK
- Greek Lessons. Translated by Deborah Smith and Emily Yae Won. London/New York: Hogarth. 2023. ISBN 9780593595275.UK US
- Human Acts. Translated by Deborah Smith. London: Portobello Books. 2016. ISBN 9781846275968.UK
- The White Book. Translated by Deborah Smith. London: Portobello Books. 2017. ISBN 9781846276958.UK
- We Do Not Part. Translated by Emily Yae Won and Paige Aniyah Morris. London/New York: Hogarth. 2025. ISBN 9780593595459.UK US
- Convalescence. Translated by Seung-hee Jeon. ASIA Publishers. 2017.
- Europa. Translated by Deborah Smith. Strangers Press. 2017.

=== Short story collections ===
- 내 이름은 태양꽃 ("My name is Sunflower"), Munhakdongne, 2002, ISBN 9788982814792.
- 붉은 꽃 이야기 ("The red flower story"), Yolimwon, 2003, ISBN 9788970633336.
- 천둥 꼬마 선녀 번개 꼬마 선녀 ("Thunder little fairy, lightning little fairy"), Munhakdongne, 2007, ISBN 9788954602792.
- 눈물상자 ("Tear box"), Munhakdongne, 2008, ISBN 9788954605816.

=== Stories ===
| Title | Year | First published | Reprinted/ collected | Notes |
|---|---|---|---|---|
| "The Middle Voice" | 2023 | Han Kang (6 February 2023). "The middle voice". The New Yorker. Vol. 98, no. 48. Translated from the Korean by Deborah Smith and Emily Yae Won. pp. 50–58. | | The story is an excerpt from the novel Greek Lessons. |
| "Heavy Snow" | 2024 | Kang, Han (10 November 2024). "Heavy snow". The New Yorker. Translated from the Korean by e. yaewon and Paige Aniyah Morris. | | The story is an excerpt from the novel We Do Not Part. |

=== Poetry collections ===
- 서랍에 저녁을 넣어 두었다 ("I put dinner in the drawer"), Moonji, 2013, ISBN 9788932024639.

=== Essays ===
- 사랑과, 사랑을 둘러싼 것들 ("Love and things surrounding love"), Yolimwon, 2003, ISBN 9788970633695.
- 가만가만 부르는 노래 ("A song to sing calmly"), Bichae, 2007, ISBN 9788992036276.
- 빛과 실 [Light and Thread] (in Korean). Moonji Publishing Co., Ltd. 2025. ISBN 9788932043562.

== Adaptations ==
Baby Buddha and The Vegetarian have been made into films. Lim Woo-Seong wrote and directed Vegetarian, which was released in 2009. It was one of only 14 selections (out of 1,022 submissions) included in the World Narrative Competition of the North American Film Fest, and was noticed at the Busan International Film Festival.

Lim also adapted Baby Buddha into a screenplay, in collaboration with Han, and directed the film version. Titled Scars, it was released in 2011.

== See also ==
- Korean literature
- List of Korean novelists
- List of Korean-language poets
- List of Korean women writers
- List of Nobel laureates in Literature
