= Greek Lessons =

2011 novel by Han Kang

- First English edition
- Author: Han Kang
- Language: Korean
- Published: 2011 (Munhakdongne) (Korean); 2017 (Plumes) (French); 2023 (Pax) (Norwegian); 2023 (Hogarth) (English); 2023 (Random House) (Spanish); 2023 (La Magrana) (Catalan)
- Publication place: South Korea
- Pages: 194 (1st Korean edition)
- ISBN: 9788954616515

Greek Lessons (Korean: 희랍어 시간, romanized: Huirabeo Sigan) is a 2011 novel by South Korean author Han Kang. Published in South Korea on November 10, 2011, the book received an English-language release on April 18, 2023 by Hogarth Press. The novel was translated into English by Deborah Smith and Emily Yae Won.

== Plot ==
A young, recently mute woman begins taking a class in Ancient Greek in an effort to reclaim language in some way. Her teacher, who is slowly going blind, draws closer to her over the course of their classes. As they become more intimately connected, they explore their inner pains and tensions together.

== Development ==
=== Publication history ===
Greek Lessons was first published in South Korea on November 10, 2011, by Munhakdongne. The English-language edition, translated by Deborah Smith and Emily Yae Won, was published by Hogarth Press on April 18, 2023.

== Reception ==
Publishers Weekly and Kirkus Reviews both published positive reviews praising the narrative and Han's prose. The San Francisco Chronicle described Han as "one of the most unconventional, perceptive, and truly innovative writers publishing today" in a positive review, while The Los Angeles Times praised her for "writing into discomfort." Em Strang wrote in The Guardian that translating the book into English was a benefit as it highlighted the book's thematic exploration of language. TIME named the book one of the 100 must-read books of 2023, calling it a "profoundly sad yet hopeful look at the connection that comes with shared language—even when it is not spoken."

Idra Novey, writing for The New York Times Book Review, praised Han's character work and the novel's themes yet noted that Han's "voice seem[ed] less certain" than in her previous work. In contrast, The Times' Alice O'Keefe was more critical, writing that Han's language could be "beautiful and surprising" yet criticizing the novel's dark tone. A review in The Wall Street Journal concurred, arguing that the novel's existential themes were better handled in her previous book The Vegetarian.
