= Human Acts =

2014 novel by Han Kang

- Author: Han Kang
- Original title: 소년이 온다 lit "A Boy Comes"
- Translator: Deborah Smith
- Language: Korean
- Genre: Contemporary fiction Literary fiction
- Set in: Gwangju, South Korea
- Publisher: Changbi Publishers (KOR); Portobello Books (UK); Hogarth (UK, US)
- Publication date: 19 May 2014 (KOR); 3 November 2016 (UK); 17 October 2017 (UK, US)
- Publication place: South Korea
- Media type: Print
- Pages: 215 pp
- ISBN: 9788936434120

Human Acts (Korean: 소년이 온다; RR: Sonyeoni onda; lit. A Boy Comes) is a South Korean novel written by Han Kang. The novel draws upon the suppression of the Gwangju Uprising in May 1980 by the recently installed government of coup d'état leader Chun Doo-hwan. In the novel, the death of a young boy, Dong-ho, and its defining role in the lives of his friends and family members, allows for a multidimensional analysis of the long-term impact of the crisis on the residents of Gwangju. Human Acts won Korea's Manhae Prize for Literature and Italy's Premio Malaparte.

== Plot ==
Human Acts deals with the May 1980 Gwangju Uprising and the death of the young boy Kang Dong-ho. The novel is composed of seven chapters including the final epilogue, with each chapter tracing the passage of time from the incident in the 1980s to the present day. At the same time, the narrative expands to describe the impact that this incident had on other people.

The first chapter follows Kang Dong-ho and his circumstances at the time of the May uprising, while introducing the people in his life. The characters that are introduced in this initial chapter later appear as the narrator or central protagonist in the following chapters. The second chapter follows the story of Dong-ho's friend Jeong-dae, who died in the May uprising. The protagonist in the third chapter is Eun-sook, who worked with Dong-ho to collect the dead bodies after the Gwangju Uprising. Eun-sook is living in the mid-1980s and works at a publishing agency. The fourth chapter traces the arc of Kim Jin-su, who was jailed for his involvement in the Gwangju Uprising. He had spent time with Dong-ho and Jin-su and was the only boy who survived. Unable to bear his guilt, however, Jin-su takes his own life nearly ten years after the May 18 uprising. The narrator of the fifth chapter is Seon-ju, who suffered terrible sexual torture during the uprising and is working as an activist in the present day. The sixth chapter is a current-day soliloquy by Dong-ho's mother, while in the epilogue, the author herself appears as the narrator. In this manner, Kang Dong-ho's death and the confessions and testimonies of the people who remember him compose the framework of the novel.

== Development and publication ==
Human Acts was serialized in the literary blog Window (창문) run by Changbi, a Korean publishing house, from November 2013 to January 2014. Later, Human Acts was published in novel form as the author's sixth full-length novel. The novel is inspired by the Gwangju Uprising, a significant event in Korea's contemporary history that occurred on 18 May 1980. The uprising's consequence is reflected in both the writing and the author's statements about her personal experiences and ordeal in writing the novel. Han once remarked that her life was changed when, as a child, she looked through an album of photographs her father obtained from the Gwangju Uprising. She conducted extensive research and reportage before writing fiction based on this violent historic incident. Referring to her experience while composing the novel, Han mentioned that she could sometimes write only three lines a day due to the emotional toll of the incident. However, she has also said that Human Acts remains her most cherished work.

The novel's original title was You, In the Summer to shed light on the fact that spring has passed and summer has come, with the boy no longer alive to welcome the new season. The title was also intended to hint at how cruel summer can be. The ultimate title Human Acts was decided at the last minute. The young protagonist in the novel is merely referred to as "you" throughout the book, and the novel hauntingly makes it appear as if he is traveling across time from the 1980s to the present day. The boy is dead and can no longer be seen, but his presence can be felt each time the people who knew him calls for him.

The novel has been translated into at least 18 languages.

== Reception ==
Both the author and her critics have hailed Human Acts as her most representative work. Although the novel describes an incident familiar to most Korean readers, critics pointed out that the book was able to maintain its pace and tension until the end largely thanks to the power of Han's writing.

Writing in The Korea Times, scholar and cultural critic David Tizzard compares Han Kang to the poet Park Nohae and suggests that her work is a symbol of Korean democracy. A deeply personal voice that "carries the weight of an entire nation."

During the Park Geun-hye administration, Human Acts was excluded from inclusion into the Sejong Library project for reasons of ideological bias (books featuring keywords such as the Gwangju Uprising, North Korea, Kaesong Industrial Complex, Karl Marx, etc. were largely excluded from the same list), and Han Kang was placed on the blacklist of professionals in the culture and the arts.

== Style and themes ==
Human Acts was written in the author's characteristically poetic, succinct style. Rather than discussing the heavy, somber ramifications of the Gwangju Uprising or using titillating language, Han Kang chose to portray the grief of the individual people in a concise, boiled-down style. To appear authentic, the testimonies are offered individually across different chapters, by different narrators, in different styles, and in different forms. Together, these stories create a nuanced, dimensional look at the Gwangju Uprising. To ensure the readers can appreciate the novel in a more deliberate, measured pace, some of the passages have been italicized to slow the readers down.

The characters in Human Acts are average citizens. The novel illustrates how these people respond to the sudden tragedy that befell them. Rather than reenacting the historical incident, the author chose to place the perspectives squarely on the people who endured the horrific accident and the trauma they have had to carry since.

Human Acts asks fundamental questions about the still-open wounds inflicted by state violence and human brutality. In the book, it is asked, "What does it mean to be human? What should we do, to make sure humans don't become something?" This question is central to the novel and leads to the understanding that survivors must discuss the incident, record it, and remember it to make sure the unfortunate event, where the victims were their own neighbors, our friends, and our family members, will not repeat itself. The most fundamental way to make sure a painful historical event does not repeat itself is to remember what happened. The author herself has said she wants this novel not to expose or accuse, but rather to serve as a testimony and a gesture of mourning.

== Awards ==
- Manhae Prize for Literature (2014)
- Premio Malaparte (2017)

== Adaptations ==
Human Acts was adapted for a theatrical production May 18 in Poland in October 2019. This was the first play produced in Europe that deals with the May 18 uprising. The May 18 Memorial Foundation provided material to inform the play. When the production was first staged in June for a limited four-time run, it was well received for having combined a Western production with Asian aesthetics.
