= Deborah Smith (translator) =

British translator of Korean fiction (born 1987)

Deborah Smith FRSL (born 15 December 1987) is a British translator of Korean fiction. She translated The Vegetarian by Korean author Han Kang, for which she and the author were co-winners of the Man Booker International Prize in 2016.

After graduating from the University of Cambridge, Smith began learning Korean in 2009, after discovering that there were few English translations of Korean literature. In 2015, Smith founded Tilted Axis Press, a non-profit publishing house devoted to books that "might not otherwise make it into English." She has been a research fellow at SOAS.

In June 2018 Smith was elected Fellow of the Royal Society of Literature in its "40 Under 40" initiative.

== Debate over translation ==
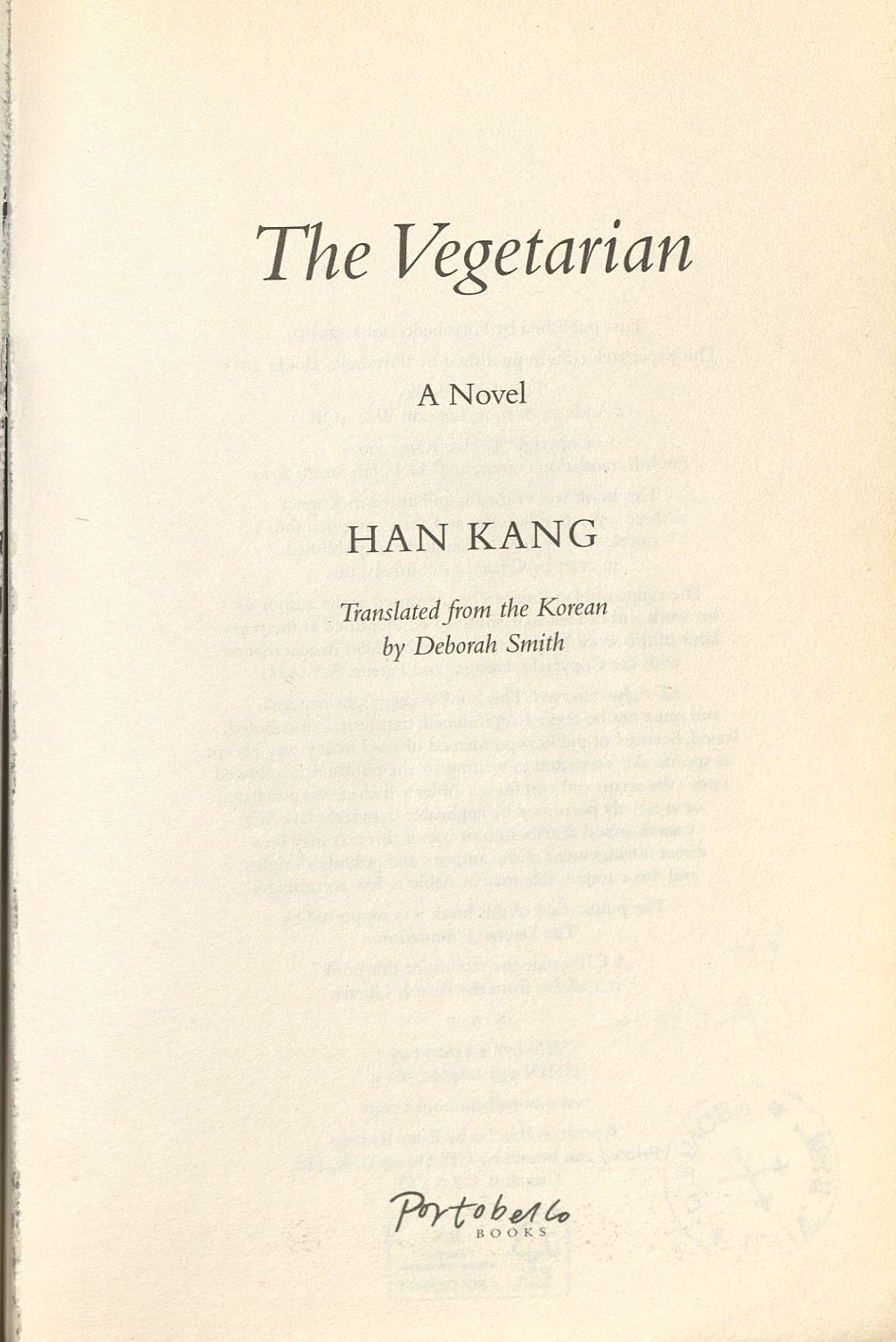
The Vegetarian (2015)

In an article published in 2017, writer and academic Charse Yun from Ewha Womans University reported on criticisms in the Korean media of the English translation of The Vegetarian because of its omissions, embellishments, and mistranslations. After reading the translation against the original, Yun wonders,

Did the translation take things too far? One distinguished translator told me he felt the context and style were so different that it was more reasonable to speak of Smith’s work as an adaptation, not a translation.

While Yun calls the translation "a stunning achievement," he acknowledges that for some readers who are familiar with the original "the translation has deviated so far ... that the disparity strains their eyes and ruins their enjoyment." Smith has defended her translation, stating

To say that my English translation of The Vegetarian is a “completely different book” from the Korean original is, of course, in one sense, entirely correct. Since there is no such thing as a truly literal translation — no two languages’ grammars match, their vocabularies diverge, even punctuation has a different weight — there can be no such thing as a translation that is not “creative.” And while most of us translators think of ourselves as “faithful,” definitions of faithfulness can differ. Because languages function differently, much of translation is about achieving a similar effect by different means; not only are difference, change, and interpretation completely normal, but they are in fact an integral part of faithfulness.

The author Han Kang has stood by Smith's translation.

== Translations ==
=== Han Kang ===
- The Vegetarian (2015)
- Human Acts (2016)
- The White Book (2017)
- Greek Lessons (2023) - with Emily Yae Won

=== Bae Suah ===
- A Greater Music (2016)
- Recitation (2017)
- North Station (2017)
- Untold Day and Night (2020)

=== Others ===
- Ahn Do-Hyun, The Salmon Who Dared To Leap Higher (2015)
- Bandi, The Accusation (2017)
