= The Vegetarian =

2007 novel by Han Kang

- Hardcover edition
- Author: Han Kang
- Original title: 채식주의자
- Translator: Deborah Smith
- Language: Korean
- Genre: Contemporary fiction, Asian culture, literary fiction
- Publisher: Changbi Publishers (S. Korea); Portobello Books (UK)
- Publication date: 30 October 2007 (S. Korea); 1 January 2015 (UK); 1 February 2016 (US)
- Publication place: South Korea
- Media type: Print (hardback) and (paperback)
- Pages: 160 pp (US paperback edition)
- ISBN: 978-89-364-3359-8

- The Vegetarian
- Hangul: 채식주의자
- Hanja: 菜食主義者
- RR: Chaesikjuuija
- MR: Ch'aesikchuŭija

The Vegetarian (Korean: 채식주의자) is a 2007 novel by South Korean writer Han Kang, winner of the 2024 Nobel Prize in Literature. Based on Han's 1997 short story "The Fruit of My Woman", The Vegetarian is a three-part novel set in modern-day Seoul and tells the story of Yeong-hye, a part-time graphic artist and home-maker, whose decision to stop eating meat or animal products after a bloody nightmare about human cruelty leads to devastating consequences in her personal and family life.

Published on 30 October 2007 in South Korea by Changbi Publishers, The Vegetarian was received as "very extreme and bizarre" by the South Korean audience. "Mongolian Mark", the second and central part of the novel, was awarded the prestigious Yi Sang Literary Prize. It has been translated into at least thirteen languages, including English, French, Spanish, and Chinese.

The Vegetarian is Han's first novel to be translated into English. The translation was conducted by the British translator Deborah Smith, and was published in January 2015 in the UK and February 2016 in the US, after which it received international critical acclaim, with critics praising Han's writing style and Smith's translation. In May 2016, it won the 2016 Man Booker International Prize. The Vegetarian thus became the first recipient of the award after its reconfiguration in 2015, prior to which it was awarded to an author's body of work rather than a single novel. It is considered to be Korean translated literature's biggest win since Kyung-Sook Shin's Please Look After Mom won the closing Man Asian Literary Prize in 2012. Prior to it winning the prize, The Vegetarian had sold close to 20,000 copies in the nine years since its first publication. In June 2016, Time included the book in its list of best books of 2016. In 2026, The Guardian included it at number 85 of its list of the 100 best novels of all time.

== Plot ==
The Vegetarian tells the story of Yeong-hye, a graphic designer who, one day, suddenly decides to stop eating animal products after a series of dreams involving images of animal slaughter. This abstention leads her to become distanced from her family and from society. The story is told in three parts: "The Vegetarian", "Mongolian Mark", and "Flaming Trees". The first section is narrated by Yeong-hye's husband, Mr. Cheong, in the first person. The second section is narrated in third person focusing on Yeong-hye's brother-in-law; and the third section remains in third-person but focuses on her sister, In-hye, while sporadically speaking in the present tense.

=== "The Vegetarian" ===
Mr. Cheong considers his wife to be "completely unremarkable in any way". He explains that when he first met her, he was not even attracted to her and that suited him just fine. Mr. Cheong is content with meandering through life; it seems as if his only goal is to live a conventional, unremarkable life. He chooses to marry his wife since he thinks she would prove to be a good, dutiful wife who would fit nicely into the kind of lifestyle he seeks. After several years of relatively normal marriage, Mr. Cheong wakes up to find his wife disposing of all meat products in the house. He demands an explanation, and Yeong-hye replies vaguely that "I had a dream." Mr. Cheong attempts to rationalize his wife's life decision over the next few months and to deal with vegetarian meals at home, but as Yeong-hye gradually starts to eat less and continues to get thinner, he eventually calls Yeong-hye's family and an intervention is scheduled. Because of his smell of meat, Yeong-hye refuses to have sexual relationships with him. Despite her refusal, he rapes her repeatedly. While around the dinner table, Yeong-hye's family attempts to convince her to eat meat; her father, who served in Vietnam and is known for his stern temperament, slaps her when she refuses. Her father then asks a reluctant Mr. Cheong and Yeong-hye's brother Yeong-ho to hold her arms while he force-feeds her a piece of pork. Yeong-hye breaks away, spits out the pork, grabs a fruit knife, and slits her wrist. The incredulous family rushes her to a hospital where she recovers and where Mr. Cheong admits to himself that she has become mentally unstable. At the hospital Yeong-hye's mother makes her drink a non-vegetarian drink by saying that it is made out of vegetables. When she realizes the truth, she vomits all of what she had drunk and eaten. As the section ends Yeong-hye manages to walk out of the hospital and when she is tracked down, she reveals a bird in her palm, which has a "predator's bite" in it, and she asks "Have I done something wrong?"

=== "Mongolian Mark" ===
The unnamed husband of Yeong-hye's sister, In-hye, is a video artist who has been conflicted for quite some time. He imagines a love-making scene between two people, with their bodies decorated by painted flowers and, upon learning that Yeong-hye has a Mongolian spot birthmark shaped like a flower petal, he is drawn towards her, being unable to stop thinking about her. He forms a plan to paint and record her in order to bring this artistic image to life. It is revealed that he is attracted to Yeong-hye, especially after checking up on her and finding her unabashedly naked in her apartment. Yeong-hye agrees to model for him and he paints flowers across her body in a studio rented from an art professor in the area. He follows up this project with a second piece of art, which involves recruiting a fellow artist to join Yeong-hye in a sexually-explicit film. When the brother-in-law asks if the two will engage in actual intercourse, his friend is disgusted and leaves. Yeong-hye, who had become aroused during this sequence, claims it was because of the flowers painted on the man's body. The brother-in-law asks his ex-girlfriend to paint flowers on him and visits Yeong-hye, where the brother-in-law has intercourse with Yeong-hye. When his wife discovers the film, she calls "emergency services", claiming that both he and Yeong-hye are mentally unwell. He contemplates jumping off of the balcony, most likely to his death, but remains "rooted to the spot" and is escorted out of the building by the authorities.

=== "Flaming Trees" ===
In-hye remains the only member of the family to support Yeong-hye after her mental and physical decline. She has separated from her husband after the events of the previous section, and is left to take care of their son in addition to her deteriorating sister. As Yeong-hye's behavior worsens, she is admitted to a mental hospital at Mount Ch'ukseong, where, despite receiving high-level treatment for anorexia nervosa and schizophrenia, she behaves gradually more plant-like. On one occasion she escapes the hospital and is found standing in a forest "soaked with rain as if she herself were one of the glistening trees". In-hye, who constantly ruminates about the pain of dealing with her divorce and the care of her child and who throughout the chapter shows signs of her own depression and mental instability, visits Yeong-hye regularly and continues to try to get her to eat. Yeong-hye has given up food altogether, and when In-hye witnesses the doctors force-feeding her and threatening sedation to prevent vomiting, In-hye bites the nurse holding her back and grabs her sister. In-hye and Yeong-hye are driven to a different hospital by ambulance, and In-hye observes trees as they pass by, which is a hint at the possible inheritance of similar vegetal psyche, which affects her as well.

== Development ==
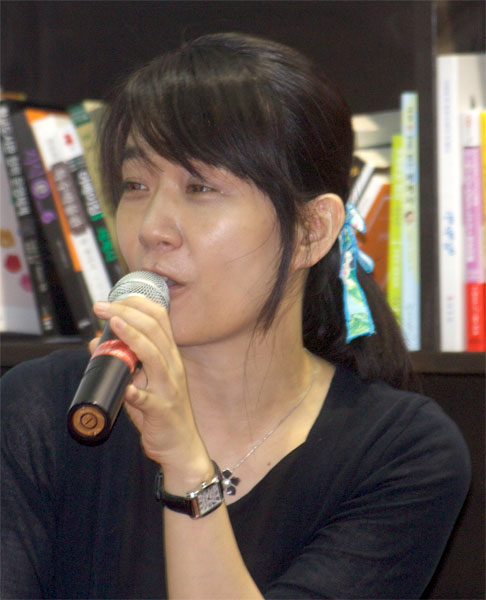
Han Kang's book became the first book to win the new edition of Man Booker International Prize.

=== Writing ===
Han first got the idea of writing about vegetation or plants when, as a university student, she came across the work of the noted Korean writer Yi Sang. In particular, she was struck by the quote "I believe that humans should be plants." Han's lifelong exploration of the themes of violence and humanity is also reflected in the book, which primarily deals with human beings' natural and daily choices in terms of food. Talking to Sarah Shin for The White Review, she said, "While writing The Vegetarian, I was harboring questions about human violence and the (im)possibility of innocence. On the reverse side of the protagonist Yeong-hye's extreme attempt to turn her back on violence by casting off her own human body and transforming into a plant lies a deep despair and doubt about humanity." In February 2016, while talking to Bethanne Patrick of Literary Hub, Han explained, "The idea for the book originally came to me as an image of a woman turning into a plant. I wrote a short story, "The Fruit of My Woman", in 1997, where a woman literally turns into a plant. After several years (2003–2004) I reworked this image in The Vegetarian, in a darker and fiercer way."

In a February 2016 interview with The Guardian, Han Kang said, "As a teenager I suffered typical questions: why pain, why death? I thought that books held the answers, but curiously I realized they contain only questions. Their writers were weak and vulnerable just like we were." Writing the book was a difficult task, she said, with the main cause being her joint problems which started in her mid-30s. She wrote the entire novel in longhand. While researching the book, Han met with both a video artist (to write the second part of the book) and a psychiatrist (to write the third part of the book). According to Han, the content of the video artist's work was completely different from that of the video art described in the book.

The Vegetarian was first published in Korean in 2007 in South Korea as Chaeshikjueuija by Changbi Publishers. ASIA Publishers subsequently bought the rights to the book and published the English translation for distribution in South Korea. It also published the English versions of Han's novella "Convalescence", and her 2016 novel Human Acts.

=== Publication history ===
- Han, Kang. (2004, Summer). Chaeshikjueuija [The Vegetarian] The Quarterly Changbi, 124(2). [In Korean]
- Han, Kang. (2004, Autumn). Monggobanjeom [Mongolian Mark] Literature & Society, 67(3). [In Korean]
- Han, Kang. (2005, Winter). Namubulkkot [Flaming Trees] MunhakPan, 17(4). [In Korean]
- Han, Kang. (2007). Chaeshikjueuija [The Vegetarian]. Seoul, The Republic of Korea: Changbi Publishers [In Korean]

Chaeshikjueuija [The Vegetarian] published by Changbi Publishers in 2007, while the title is Chaeshikjueuija [The Vegetarian] as the first short story of the novel is the title piece of it, contains all the three short stories each of which was published previously in 3 separate South Korean literary magazines, and it is the original script translated into English by Deborah Smith.

=== Translation ===
The Vegetarian has been translated into thirty-five languages since its publication in 2007. Following is a list containing information about the translated works.

| Language | Title | Publisher | Publishing date | Translator | Reference |
|---|---|---|---|---|---|
| Vietnamese | Người Ăn Chay | NXB Trẻ | January 2011 | Hoàng Hải Vân | |
| Japanese | 『菜食主義者』 | Cuon | 15 June 2011 | Kim Hun-a (金壎我) | |
| Spanish (Argentina) | La vegetariana | Bajo la luna | 10 November 2012 | Sun-me Yoon | |
| Polish | Wegetarianka | Kwiaty Orientu | 27 January 2014 | Justyna Najbar-Miller and Choi Jeong In | |
| English | The Vegetarian | Portobello Books | 1 January 2015 | Deborah Smith | |
| Dutch | De vegetariër | Nijgh & Van Ditmar | 3 February 2015 | Monique Eggermont | |
| French | La Végétarienne | Serpent à plume | 21 May 2015 | Jacques Batilliot and Jong Eun-Jin | |
| Chinese (Taiwan) | 素食者 | Azoth Books (漫遊者文化) | 7 April 2016 | Qian Ri (千日, 2016 ver.); Hu Jiaotong (胡椒筒, 2023 ver.) | |
| German | Die Vegetarierin | Aufbau-Verlag | 15 August 2016 | Ki-Hyang Lee | |
| Italian | La vegetariana | Adelphi | 13 October 2016 | Milena Zemira Ciccimarra | |
| Romanian | Vegetariana | Editura ART | November 2016 | Iolanda Prodan | |
| Kurdish | ڕووەکی | Ghazalnus | 22 December 2016 | Hazhar Osman | |
| Ukrainian | Вегетаріанка | KM Books КМ-Букс | 2016 | Anzhela Asman (Анжела Асман) | |
| Serbian | Vegetarijanka | Dereta | 2016 | Ana Marija Grbić | |
| Swedish | Vegetarianen | Natur & Kultur | 7 January 2017 | Eva Johansson | |
| Hungarian | Növényevő | Jelenkor | 10 February 2017 | Kim Bogook and Nikoletta Németh | |
| Turkish | Vejetaryen | April | 10 September 2016 | Goksel Turkozu | |
| Catalan | La vegetariana | Rata | March 2017 | Mihwa Jo and Raimon Blancafort | |
| Spanish (Spain) | La vegetariana | Rata | March 2017 | Sunme Yoon | |
| Finnish | Vegetaristi | Gummerus | March 2017 | Sari Karhulahti | |
| Icelandic | Grænmetisætan | Bjartur | October 2017 | Ingunn Snædal | |
| Arabic | النباتية | Dar Altanweer | December 2017 | Mahmoud Abdul Ghafar | |
| Czech | Vegetariánka | Odeon | 2017 | Petra Ben-Ari | |
| Hebrew | הצמחונית | סאגה (Saga) | 2017 | Sharon Kremner (שרון קרמנר) | |
| Lithuanian | Vegetarė | Vaga Publishers | 2017 | Martynas Šiaučiūnas-Kačinskas | |
| Portuguese (Brazil) | A vegetariana | Todavia | October 2018 | Jae Hyung Woo | |
| Norwegian | Vegetarianeren | Oslo Pax | 2018 | Vivian Evelina Øverås | |
| Russian | Вегетарианка | AST (АСТ) | 2018 | Lee Sang-yun (Ли Сан Юн) | |
| Bulgarian | Вегетарианката | Enthusiast | 2020 | Tsvetomira Vekova (Цветомира Векова) | |
| Tamil | மரக்கறி | Tamilveli | 2020 | Samayavel (சமயவேல்) | |
| Malayalam | Vegetarian (വെജിറ്റേറിയൻ) | Kairali books | 2020 | C. V. Balakrishnan | |
| Slovene | Vegetarijanka | Mladinska knjiga Založba | 21 September 2021 | Urša Zabukovec | |
| Nepali | द भेजिटेरियन | Book Hill Publication | 2022 | Prawin Adhikari | |
| Galician | A vexetariana | Rinoceronte Editora | 2022 | Alba Verea Pérez | |
| Thai | เดอะเวเจอเทเรียน | Page | 2025 | Mintra Intrarat | |
| Estonian | Taimetoitlane | Loomingu Raamatukogu | 2025 | Anni Arukask | |
| Punjabi | Ik Din Achanak (ਇੱਕ ਦਿਨ ਅਚਾਨਕ) | Chetna Parkashan | 2026 | Harveer Singh | |

==== English translation ====
The book was translated from Korean into English by Deborah Smith, a British translator, who has been translating Korean into English since 2010. She is the founder of Tilted Axis Press, a non-profit publishing house focusing on contemporary fiction specifically from Asia. Speaking at the Seoul International Book Fair on 15 June 2016, Smith said that a translator "must be unfaithful to some aspects in order to be faithful to others. I try to stay faithful to the spirit, and faithful to the letter as much as I can, without compromising the spirit." Talking about the process, Han said, "Deborah usually sends me the file of her translation after she finishes, with notes and questions. And I send it back to her with my answers and notes. It is just like having a chat endlessly. I truly enjoy this process. I am lucky to have met Deborah, a wonderful translator who can render subtlety and delicacy." Smith has said that her first attempt at Korean translation involved "looking up practically every other word in the dictionary". Smith has translated some of Han's other works, including Human Acts (2016) and The White Book (2017).

Smith's translation was criticized in South Korea for inaccuracies. The Los Angeles Times noted that Smith embellished Han's writing style, quoting a translator who called it an "adaptation" rather than a translation. Scholars have pointed out various mistakes, including concerns that Smith may have attributed some of the dialogue to the wrong characters. Writing for The Guardian, Claire Armitstead felt that Smith's "activist" translation helped make South Korean literature more accessible. Smith defended her translation in the Los Angeles Review of Books.

== Themes ==
The novella primarily deals with desire, shame, and empathy reflected by the characters' faltering attempts to understand the people around them. Charles Montgomery, a teacher in the English interpretation and translation division of Dongguk University and the editor of the Korean Literature in Translation website, states that Han's "description of some evil functions of life" is reminiscent of her previous book, "Convalescence", which is a novella about a group of people each of whom have suffered different kinds of trauma. Montgomery argues that "since it's written from the perspective of multiple narrators it achieves a kind of overall verisimilitude and three-dimensional character".

Contrary to what the title might suggest, the book only briefly touches on the philosophy of vegetarianism and the associated diet.

During a 2016 interview, Han Kang stated, "I think this novel has some layers: questioning human violence and the (im)possibility of innocence; defining sanity and madness; the (im)possibility of understanding others, body as the last refuge or the last determination, and some more. It will be inevitable that different aspects are more focused on by different readers and cultural backgrounds. If I could say one thing, this novel isn't a singular indictment of the Korean patriarchy. I wanted to deal with my long-lasting questions about the possibility/impossibility of innocence in this world, which is mingled with such violence and beauty. These were universal questions that occupied me as I wrote it".

== Reception ==
Boyd Tomkin, chairman of the 2016 Man Booker International Prize judging panel, lauded the book for its "disturbing outlook on a subject of vast interest", and Smith's "creative effort for blending beauty and horror". He commented, "This compact, exquisite, and disturbing book will linger long in the minds, and maybe the dreams, of its readers. Deborah Smith's perfectly judged translation matches its uncanny blend of beauty and horror at every turn."

Julia Pascal, writing for The Independent said, "It is the women who are killed for daring to establish their own identity. The narrative makes it clear it is the crushing pressure of Korean etiquette which murders them. Han Kang is well served by Deborah Smith's subtle translation in this disturbing book." Porochista Khakpour, writing for The New York Times, states that the book is nothing like typical stories about vegetarianism that end with "enlightenment". She compares the work with African-Australian author Ceridwen Dovey's novella Blood Kin, American author Herman Melville's 1853 short story "Bartleby, the Scrivener", Iranian author Sadegh Hedayat's 1937 cult horror story The Blind Owl, and various journals and works of Czech author Franz Kafka, including A Hunger Artist.

Calling it "an extraordinary story of family fallout", Daniel Hahn of The Guardian wrote, "Sentence by sentence, The Vegetarian is an extraordinary experience. Last year's London Book Fair had Korea as guest of honour, in the hope of tempting English-language publishers to seek out more contemporary Korean novelists, but The Vegetarian will be hard to beat. It is sensual, provocative and violent, ripe with potent images, startling colors and disturbing questions." Claire Fallon, writing for The Huffington Post, called it "an elegant tale, in three parts, of a woman whose sudden turn to veganism disrupts her family and exposes the worst human appetites and impulses". Calling it a melancholic tale of something more than vegetarianism, Thrity Umrigar, writing in The Boston Globe, described The Vegetarian as a tale of a woman torn between a stock of her own cautious and conventional life choices and her family members who are not as innocent as they seem to be.

Gabe Habash of Publishers Weekly called it an ingenious, upsetting, and unforgettable novel. He added, "There is much to admire in Han's novel. Its three-part structure is brilliant, gradually digging deeper and deeper into darker and darker places; the writing is spare and haunting; but perhaps most memorable is its crushing climax, a phantasmagoric yet emotionally true moment that's surely one of the year's most powerful". He compared its parts to Patrick Süskind's Perfume, Herman Koch's The Dinner, and Hanya Yanagihara's A Little Life respectively. Eileen Battersby, writing for The Irish Times, said, "The Vegetarian is more than a cautionary tale about the brutal treatment of women: it is a meditation on suffering and grief. It is about escape and how a dreamer takes flight. Most of all, it is about the emptiness and rage of discovering there is nothing to be done when all hope and comfort fails. For all the graphic, often choreographed description, Han Kang has mastered eloquent restraint in a work of savage beauty and unnerving physicality." Laura Miller, writing for Slate, compares the straightforward style of writing with works by the Japanese author Haruki Murakami.

== Honors ==
In June 2016, Time included the book in its mid-year list of best books of 2016. In 2024, the New York Times ranked the book 49th in its list of the 100 best novels of the 21st century.

=== Awards ===
The second part of the novella, "Mongolian Mark", was awarded the Yi Sang Literary Prize, one of the most prestigious literary awards in South Korea.

==== 2016 Man Booker International Prize ====
In 2016, the English translated edition of the book won the Man Booker International Prize for fiction, with the judging panel citing it as "unforgettably powerful and original". The book became the first winner of the prize for which only one work of the author was judged, as compared to previous prizes which were awarded for collective works by an author. The novel beat The Story of the Lost Child by the Italian writer Elena Ferrante and A Strangeness in My Mind by the Turkish writer Orhan Pamuk, both of which were considered as frontrunners.

The prize money of £50,000 was shared by Han and Smith. The prize catapulted the book's international sales, as a further 462,000 copies were ordered and printed by Changbi Publishers to assuage the demand. Commenting on the sales, Han said, "I am overwhelmed. I had thought the previous 20,000 copies sold was good enough. I feel that Korean literature is starting to become a trend, now is just the beginning."

In 2026, The Vegetarian was voted the readers' favourite of all the Booker winners in the last ten years.

==== List of awards ====
| Year | Award | Notes |
|---|---|---|
| 2005 | Yi Sang Literary Prize | Awarded to Monggobanjeom [Mongolian Mark], a short story published in a South Korean literary magazine Literature & Society in 2004, which was included afterwards as a second piece of 2007 novel, Chaeshikjueuija [The Vegetarian] published by Changbi Publishers. |
| 2016 | Man Booker International Prize | Shared by author Han Kang and translator Deborah Smith |

== Adaptations ==
In 2009, The Vegetarian was adapted into a drama film of the same name by arthouse director Lim Woo-Seong, marking his debut. The film stars Chae Min-seo as Young-hye, alongside Kim Young-jae, Kim Yeo-jin, and Park Sang-yeon. It was produced by Blue Tree Pictures and Rudolf Film in association with Sponge Entertainment. An Italian-language stage play adaptation of The Vegetarian written by Daria Deflorian was performed at Theater Triennale and Odéon-Théâtre de l'Europe in 2024. A German-language adaptation of the novel by Ki-Hyang Lee premiered at Akademietheater in 2025.
