= The White Book =

2016 novel by the Korean novelist Han Kang

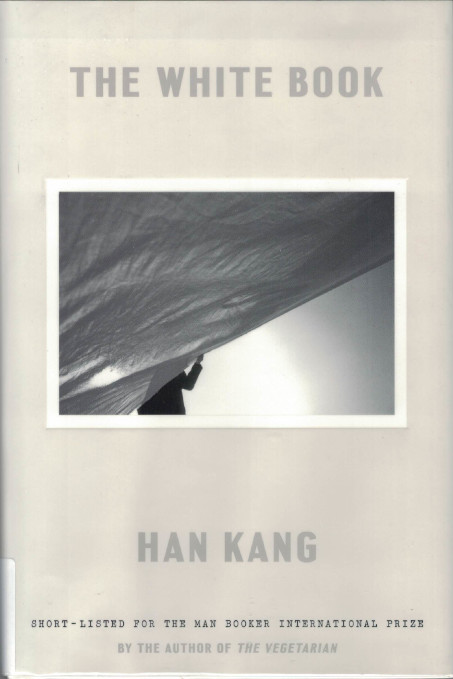
publ. Hogarth

The White Book (Korean: 흰, romanized: Huin, lit. 'White') is a 2016 novel by the Korean novelist Han Kang which was short-listed for the 2018 Man Booker International Prize. The English translation by Deborah Smith was first published by Portobello Books in 2017.

The book has been described as "a fragmented autobiographical meditation on the death of the unnamed narrator’s baby sister, who died two hours after her birth.". The novel uses an unconventional narrative and short meditations on the color white to discuss grief, loss, and the fragile nature of the human spirit. Kang describes a total of 65 white objects in the book, including rice, sugar cubes, and breast milk.

== Main White Objects List ==
- Swaddling bands
- Newborn gown
- Salt
- Snow
- Ice
- Moon
- Rice
- Waves
- Yulan
- White bird
- "Laughing whitely"
- Blank paper
- White dog
- White hair
- Shroud

== Translation ==
- Han Kang. The White Book. Translated by Smith, Deborah. Portobello Books. ISBN 978-0-525-57306-7
- Han Kang. Cartea Albă. Translated by Prodan, Iolanda. Editura ART. ISBN 978-6-067-10614-5
- Han Kang. Il libro bianco. Translated by Iovenitti, Lia. Adelphi Edizioni. ISBN 978-8-845-94054-5
- Han Kang. Blanc. Translated by Jeong, Eun-Jin and Batilliot, Jacques. Le Serpent à Plumes.ISBN 979-10-97390-75-4
