= Reservoir Bitches =

2022 short fiction anthology

- Author: Dahlia de la Cerda
- Original title: Perras de reserva
- Translator: Heather Cleary and Julia Sanches
- Language: Spanish
- Publisher: Sexto Piso, Scribe Publications
- Publication date: 2022
- Publication place: Mexico
- English publication date: 26 September 2024
- Media type: Print (paperback)
- Pages: 184
- ISBN: 978-1-915590-43-5
- Dewey Decimal: 863.7
- LC Class: PR9455.D3 R46

Reservoir Bitches is a 2022 anthology of short stories written by Dahlia de la Cerda. The collection follows the lives of thirteen interconnected Mexican women in different social contexts as they conflict with matters of race, sexuality, poverty, and politics. The novel received an English language translation in 2024 by Heather Cleary and Julia Sanches. In 2025 it was longlisted for the International Booker Prize.

== Background ==
A native of Aguascalientes, Cerda observed that the topic of feminicides was underexplored in literature. After her family suffered a feminicide, Cerda was inspired to write about the violence that women in Mexico experience, eventually expanding to social issues such as class and sexual identity. Cerda was initially discouraged from pursuing the topic, noting that people claimed it was more "sociology than literature", but after winning a literary scholarship she endeavored the write the stories that would make up Reservoir Bitches.

== Stories ==
- "Parsley and Coca Cola"
- "Yuliana"
- "God Forgive Us"
- "Costanza"
- "God Didn't Come Through"
- "La China"
- "The Rose of Sharon"
- "Regina"
- "Mariposa de Barrio"
- "The Smile"
- "Sequins"
- "Playing with Fire"
- "La Huesera"
