= Shida Bazyar =

German writer (born 1988)

- Shida Bazyar at the Frankfurt Book Fair 2026
- Born: 1988 (age 37–38); Hermeskeil
- Occupation: Author
- Writing career
- Language: German
- Notable awards: shortlisted for International Booker Prize; German Book Prize

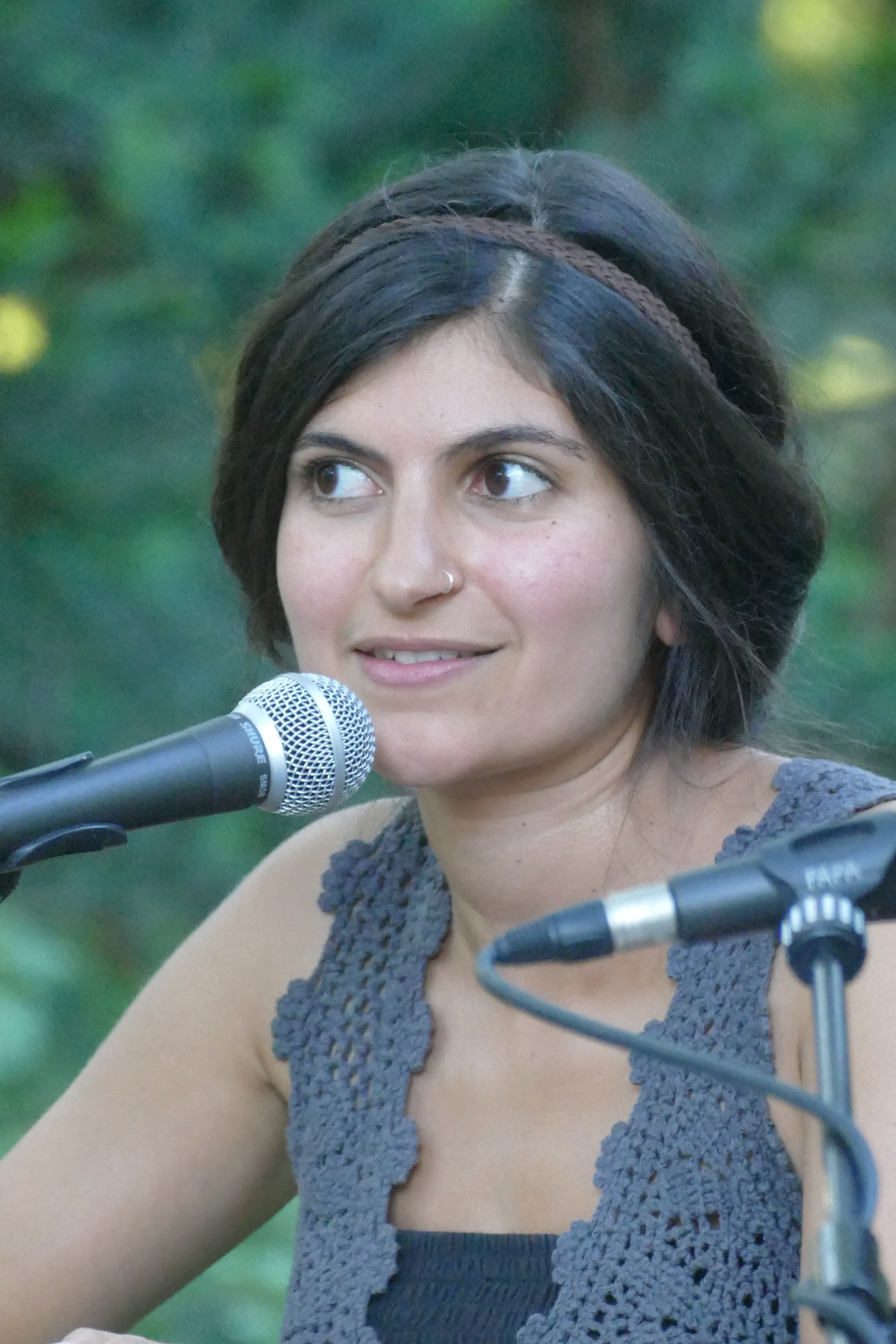
Shida Bazyar in 2016

Shida Bazyar (born in 1988 in Hermeskeil) is a Kurdish -German writer.

== Biography ==
Shida Bazyar's parents were communist political activists who fled Iran in 1987 due to the Islamic Revolution. Bazyar was born in Germany in 1988. She studied creative writing and cultural journalism at the University of Hildesheim. The Nights Are Quiet in Tehran was her first novel which is inspired by her parent's story.

== Works ==
- Bazyar, Shida (2016). Nachts ist es leise in Teheran: Roman (in German). Köln: Kiepenheuer & Witsch. ISBN 978-3-462-04891-9.
  - ——; Martin, Ruth (2025). Nights Are Quiet in Tehran. Scribe Publications. ISBN 978-1-964992-10-5.
- —— (2021). Drei Kameradinnen: Roman (in German). Köln: Kiepenheuer & Witsch. ISBN 978-3-462-05276-3.
  - ——; Martin, Ruth (2023). Sisters in arms. Brunswick, Victoria: Scribe. ISBN 978-1-915590-20-6.
- —— (2026). Die Lücken: Roman (in German). Köln: Kiepenheuer & Witsch. ISBN 978-3-462-00501-1.

== Awards ==
- 2016: Ulla Hahn Author Prize for The Nights Are Quiet in Tehran
- 2017: Uwe Johnson Debut Award for The Nights Are Quiet in Tehran
- 2021: longlisted for German Book Prize for Sister in Arms
- 2023: Ernst-Toller-Preis
- 2026: shortlisted for International Booker Prize for the English translation of The Nights Are Quiet in Tehran
- 2026: Wilhelm Raabe Literature Prize for Die Lücken
- 2026: German Book Prize for Die Lücken
