= The Book of Disappearance =

2014 Arabic novel by Ibtisam Azem

- Author: Ibtisam Azem
- Original title: سفر الاختفاء
- Translator: Sinan Antoon
- Language: Arabic
- Publisher: Dar al-Jamal
- Publication date: 2014
- Publication place: Lebanon
- English publication date: 2019
- Media type: Novel
- Pages: 242
- ISBN: 9780815611110

The Book of Disappearance (Arabic: سفر الاختفاء) is a novel by Palestinian writer and journalist Ibtisam Azem. It follows the stories of Alaa Assaf, a Palestinian man living in Jaffa in Tel Aviv, and Ariel Levy, his Israeli neighbor and friend, who finds and reads Alaa's diary after all Palestinian Arabs spontaneously vanish from Israel.

It was published by Dar al-Jamal in Beirut in 2014, and translated into English by Sinan Antoon, Azem's husband, in 2019 and was published by Syracuse University Press. The Book of Disappearance is Azem's second novel, after The Sleep Thief.

== Synopsis ==
The book takes place in the 48 hours following the total disappearance of all Palestinian Arabs within Israel. The reason for the disappearance is never learned.

The story opens in Alaa Assaf's diary, where he writes about the recent death of his beloved grandmother. He addresses the diary to her, and often writes about her memories of pre-Nakba Jaffa, which she spoke of frequently. Alaa connects his grandmother's complicated love of the city to his own, and explores both's reckoning with the pain of separation from their displaced family members and of Tel Aviv's overwriting of Jaffa's and their own history.

The narrative also follows Ariel Levy, a journalist and a liberal Zionist, who is also a neighbor and occasional friend of Alaa's. He wakes up one morning to find that all Palestinian Arabs within Israel have vanished completely. Initially this is assumed to be a worker strike or a military operation, but it becomes increasingly clear that neither of these are the case. Though some Israelis are jubilant at the disappearance of all Palestinians, general paranoia in Israel increases, and there are increased attacks against other minorities in Israel, such as Mizrahi Jews. A law is passed forcing every Israeli to register with the government or risk losing their citizenship.

After letting himself into Alaa's apartment with a spare key, Ariel takes and reads Alaa's diary. Ariel quickly begins to act with more and more ownership over Alaa's empty apartment, sleeping and spending most of his time there and even planning to change the lock. He decides to translate parts of the diary to include in a book he plans to write about the disappearance.

As the book ends, Ariel hears a rattling and a whispering coming from outside Alaa's apartment, though he cannot find the source. Alaa's diary remains open.

== Themes and reception ==
Loneliness, loss, Palestinian identity, and the erasure of Palestinian history are all prominent themes in the novel. In an interview, Azem said of the book, "The novel does revolve around the total disappearance of Palestinians, but it takes this event beyond the colonial ideology of Zionism which wants to erase and replace the colonized. It is primarily concerned with Palestinians and what their disappearance means."

Speculative fiction magazine Strange Horizons described the book as "masterful" and "a stunning illustration of the direct connection of the personal with the systemic, the systemic to the global."

It has been categorized as "a mass-disappearance novel." ArabLit writes, "Mass disappearance is a theme that often permeates Palestinian narratives, but Azem’s novel brings a new, speculative-fiction twist."

In an afterword to the English translation, translator Sinan Antoon puts the novel in conversation with C.P. Cavafy's poem "Waiting for the Barbarians."

The novel's English translation was longlisted for the 2025 International Booker Prize.

== Background ==
Azem herself is from Jaffa, where her own parents and grandmother were internally displaced in 1948. According to a reviewer from Strange Horizons, she described at the 2020 Palestine Writes Festival that in the novel "she sought to not just center the Israeli reaction, but to first establish the Palestinian presence . . . despite the premise being Palestinian absence, we still get access to Palestinian voices."

== See also ==
- The Leftovers, another mass-disappearance novel
- "Waiting for the Barbarians," a poem by C.P. Cavafy
