= GauZ' =

Ivorian novelist and photographer (born 1971)

Armand Gauz
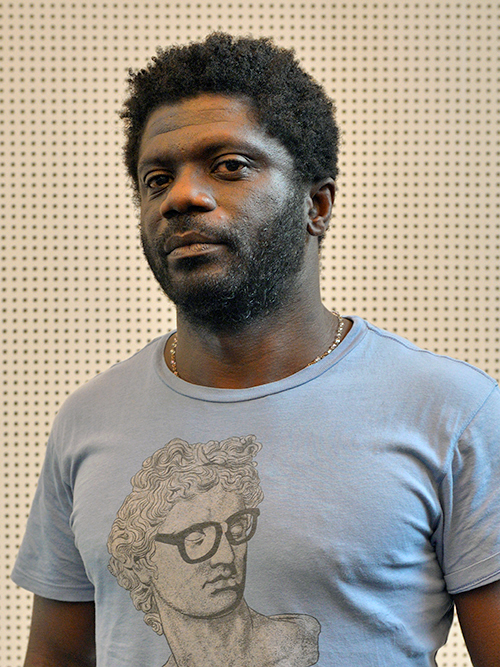
- Gauz in October 2014
- Born: March 22, 1971 (age 54); Abidjan, Ivory Coast
- Notable works: Debout-Payé

GauZ', also known as Armand Gauz, is the author name of Armand Patrick Gbaka-Brédé. He was born March 22, 1971 in Abidjan, Ivory Coast. He is an author, publisher, screenwriter, and actor. He is particularly renowned for his literary work, which explores themes of immigration, colonization, labor and identity through a lens that is often satirical and critical. He was the recipient of the Grand prix littéraire d'Afrique noire in 2018 and was shortlisted for the International Booker Prize in 2023. His screenwriting credits includes the Ivorian television series Ici C Babi — C’est doux mais c’est risqué (2022) and Niabla (2023), in which he also starred. He is the founder of Éditions Srèlè, a publishing house based in the Ivory Coast. He lives in Grand-Bassam.

== Early life and education ==
Gauz was born March 22, 1971 in Plateau, a district of Abidjan, the economic capital of Ivory Coast. He then lived in the neighborhood of Attécoubé before moving to Agnibilékrou, northeast of Abidjan. He also lived in Yopougon, Bouaké, Daloa and Cocody. His first language is Anyin.

His father was a teacher and a socialist deputy, and his mother was a nurse and communist. As a child he stayed with extended family when his parents went to Paris to study.

He received a master's degree in biochemistry from the Université Félix-Houphouët-Boigny before traveling to France in 1999 on a scholarship, though without a student visa, to obtain another master's degree in biochemistry at Paris VII Jussieu. Once in France, he managed to secure a business visa that expired after a year. During that time, he started a two-year stint as a security guard that would inspire his first novel, Standing Heavy.

He eventually obtained a visa and French nationality after the birth of his son. He returned to the Ivory Coast in 2011 and has been living in Grand-Bassam since. He has two children, who still live in Paris.

== Career ==
In 2014 Gauz published his debut novel Debout-Payé, a satire of France's colonial legacy, racism and capitalism as seen through the eyes of three undocumented Ivorian security guards in Paris from the 1970s through the early 2000s. Later that year, the novel was the inaugural winner of the newly established Gibert Joseph Booksellers' Prize. In 2022 it was published in English as Standing Heavy and shortlisted for the International Booker Prize in 2023. The title references the low-wage jobs that require people to stand for many hours.

In Camarade Papa, published in 2018 and winner of the Grand prix littéraire d'Afrique noire that year, Gauz places himself in the mind of a 19th-century White man to write a novel about colonization from the perspective of the colonizers. The other main character in the novel is a child of African origin born in Amsterdam. In 2020, Gauz published Black Manoo, which takes places in the 1990s African community of Paris and centered around a drug-addicted musician.

His book Cocoaïans (Birth of a Chocolate Nation), a political history of chocolate, was released in 2022. That same year, Gauz founded Éditions Srèlè, an Ivory Coast-based publishing house. The first book published was Le Jour montant, written by Demba Diop. Along with other African literary figures, Gauz would then spearhead the Front de Libération des Classiques Africains (FLCA), an initiative that aims to establish a fund to buy back the African rights of francophone African literary classics that are held by French publishers such as Plon, Seuil and Hachette.

In 2024 he published Portes (Doors), his fifth novel, inspired by the 1996 occupation of the church of Saint-Bernard in Paris by undocumented African immigrants. It is the final installment of his "trilogy of papers," comprising Standing Heavy and Black Manoo, all which take place in the northeastern African immigrant communities of Paris.

In addition to his literary career, Gauz has been active in the film and television sector. After directing several short documentary films, Parole(s) de Fana (2005) and Quand Sankara....(2006), he co-wrote his first feature film screenplay for Beyond the Ocean, a 2006 French film directed by Éliane de Latour about two Ivorian friends who seek better fortune in Europe. The film premiered at the 56th Berlin International Film Festival. In 2022 he scripted Ici C Babi, an Ivorian drama series that received a Special Jury Mention at FESPACO 2023 and Best Francophone Series of the South at the 2024 Lauriers de l'Audiovisuel, an award given a sub-Saharan co-production produced in partnership with TV5Monde. In 2023, he took on his first acting role in Niabla, a Canal+ Ivorian police thriller series that also he co-created and co-wrote.

== Published work ==
- Debout-Payé, Paris, Le Nouvel Attila, 2014. Translated by Frank Wynne as Standing Heavy (MacLehose Press, 2022; Biblioasis, International Translation Series, 2023).
- Camarade Papa, Paris, Le Nouvel Attila, 2018. The book is about "Ivory Coast, Marxism Leninism, and colonization."
- Black Manoo, Paris, Le Nouvel Attila, 2020.
- Cocoaïans (Naissance d’une nation chocolat), L’Arche, 2022
- Portes, Le Nouvel Attila, 2024.
- Aboudia, Rizzoli, 2024 (co-author with Ugochukwu-Smooth C. Nzewi), a monograph on the American Ivorian artist Aboudia.

== Filmography ==
Year	Title	Role	Ref
2005	Parole(s) de Fana (short film)	Director	
2006	Quand Sankara....(short film)	Director	
2006	Beyond the Ocean (feature film)	Screenwriter	
2022	Ici C Babi — C’est doux mais c’est risqué (TV series)	Screenwriter	
2023	Niabla (TV series)	Screenwriter Actor (Yao)	

== Awards ==
- Debout-Payé, 2014 Prix des libraires Gibert Joseph; shortlisted for the 2023 International Booker Prize
- Camarade Papa (2018), Grand prix littéraire d'Afrique noire
