= Anne Swärd =

Swedish writer

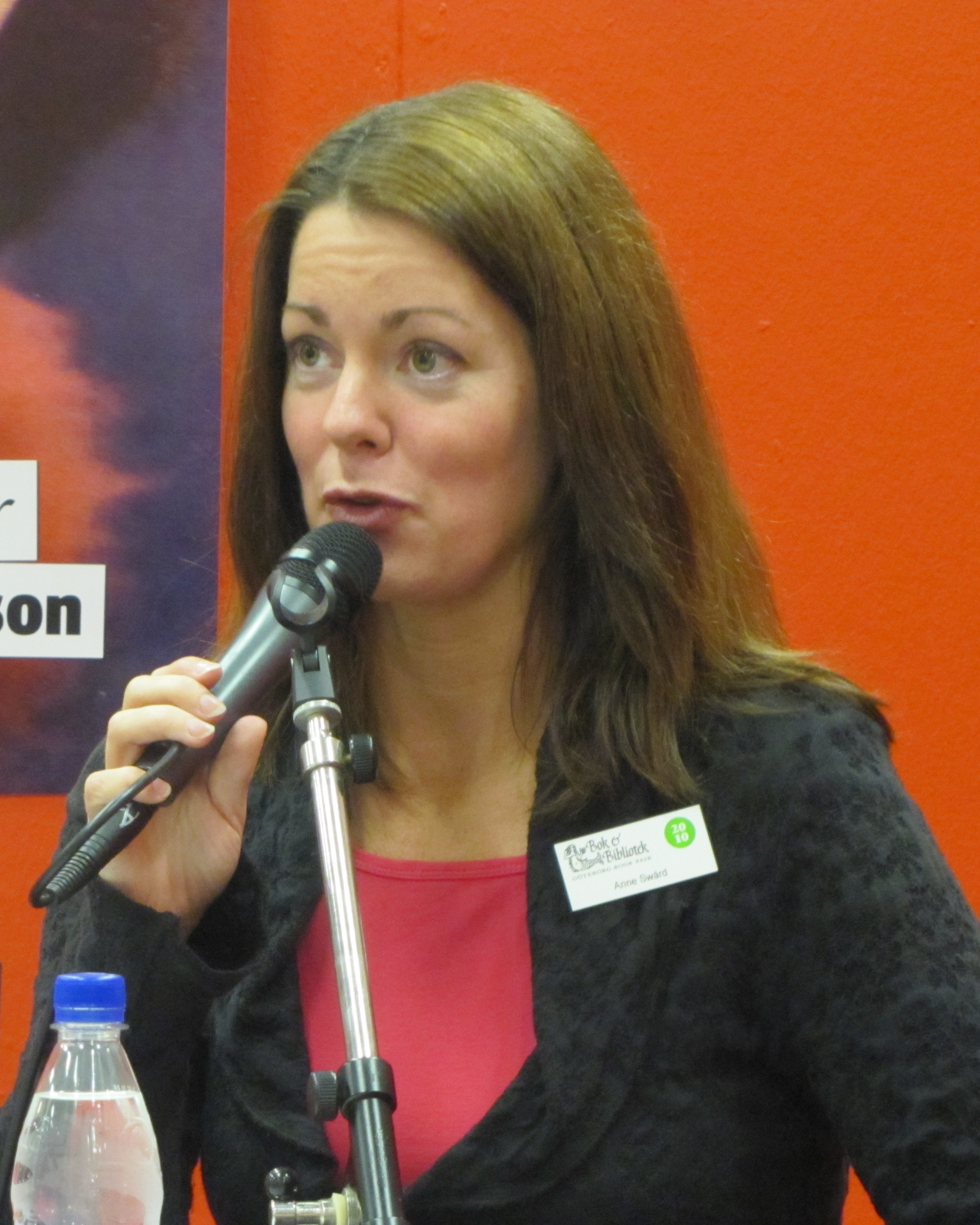
- Born: 16 February 1969 (age 57); Perstorp, Sweden
- Occupation: writer

Member of the Swedish Academy (Seat No. 13)
- Incumbent
- Assumed office 20 December 2019
- Preceded by: Sara Stridsberg

Anne Lotta Swärd (born 16 February 1969) is a Swedish writer. She made her debut as a novelist in 2003 with Polarsommar (Arctic Summer), which earned her an August Prize nomination on the grounds that "A mighty chorus of voices portray a family in crisis. The individual cast joints piece after piece to a powerful story about how betrayal and repeated confrontations erode the strongest relationships. Surprising shifts in perspective and a language that is characterized by sharp details, gives the story important nuances and psychological depth."

== Work ==
Arctic Summer received a number of awards and was translated into several languages such as German, Dutch, Polish, and Persian. Her second novel Kvicksand (Quicksand) was published in 2006. It was nominated for the Vi magazine's Literature Prize, and awarded the first scholarship from the Mare Kandre Memorial Fund. Her third novel Till sista andetaget (Breathless), winner of the Bokcirklar Award for the novel of the year, was published in 2010. It is translated into sixteen languages, including English, French and Russian.

On 28 March 2019, the Swedish Academy elected Swärd as a new member of the academy. She was inducted in December 2019.

Cultural offices
| Preceded by Sara Stridsberg | Swedish Academy, Seat No.13; 2019– | Succeeded by incumbent |
