= Ia Genberg =

Swedish journalist and writer (born 1967)

Ia Gabriella Genberg (born 5 November 1967) is a Swedish journalist and novelist.

== Career ==
Born in Stockholm, Sweden, Genberg debuted as a writer in 2012 with the novel Söta fredag ("Sweet Friday").

Her fourth novel, Detaljerna ("The Details"), won the August Prize in 2022, the year of its publication. The English translation, by Kira Josefsson, was shortlisted for the 2024 International Booker Prize. In 2025, The Details was longlisted for the International Dublin Literary Award.

In 2026, Small Comfort, Kira Josefsson's English translation of Genberg's 2019 work Klen tröst, was longlisted for the International Booker Prize.

== Published works ==
- Söta fredag, Weyler förlag, Stockholm: 2012. ISBN 978-9185849789
- Sent farväl, Weyler förlag, Stockholm: 2013. ISBN 978-9185849970
- Klen tröst och fyra andra berättelser om pengar, Weyler förlag, Stockholm: 2019. ISBN 978-9176811078
- Detaljerna, Weyler förlag, Stockholm: 2022. ISBN 9789127175549

(The Details, trans. Kira Josefsson, Wildfire Books, London: 2023. ISBN 978-1035400577)
