= The Faculty of Dreams =

Book by Sara Stridsberg

Drömfakulteten
- Author: Sara Stridsberg
- Language: Swedish
- Publisher: Albert Bonniers förlag
- Publication place: Sweden
- Pages: 363
- ISBN: 91-0-010726-3

The Faculty of Dreams (Swedish: Drömfakulteten) is a 2006 novel by Swedish writer Sara Stridsberg. The main character of the narrative is the American radical feminist Valerie Solanas. The novel received the Nordic Council Literature Prize. In 2011 it was voted as the best Swedish novel from the 2000s (decade) in a poll held by the newspaper Dagens Nyheter, which involved one hundred Swedish critics, authors, journalists and publishers. The book has been translated into Danish, English, Finnish, French, Dutch, Norwegian, Polish, Serbian, Spanish and German.

The English translation, The Faculty of Dreams, by Deborah Bragan-Turner, was nominated in March 2019 for the Man Booker International Prize.

== See also ==
- 2006 in literature
- Swedish literature
