= The Enlightenment of the Greengage Tree =

Novel by Shokoofeh Azar

The Enlightenment of the Greengage Tree (Persian: اشراق درخت گوجه سبز) is a 2020 novel written by Shokoofeh Azar, an Iranian Australian writer.

The novel, written in the magical realist style, is the narrative of a thirteen-year-old girl named Bahar from an Iranian family of five and residents of the village of Razan after the 1979 Iranian Revolution.

The novel was originally written in Persian, and was first published in English translation by the Wild Dingo Press in Australia in 2017. The translator has chosen to remain anonymous.

It was placed on the shortlist for the International Booker Prize in 2020, and Azar is the first Iranian author to have been nominated for the prize. The book was republished for audiences outside Australia by Europa Editions.

== Awards ==
- Longlisted for the 2020 National Book Award for Translated Literature
- Shortlisted for the 2020 International Booker Prize
- Longlisted for the 2021 PEN Translation Prize
