= Shokoofeh Azar =

Iranian-Australian author and journalist

- شکوفه آذر
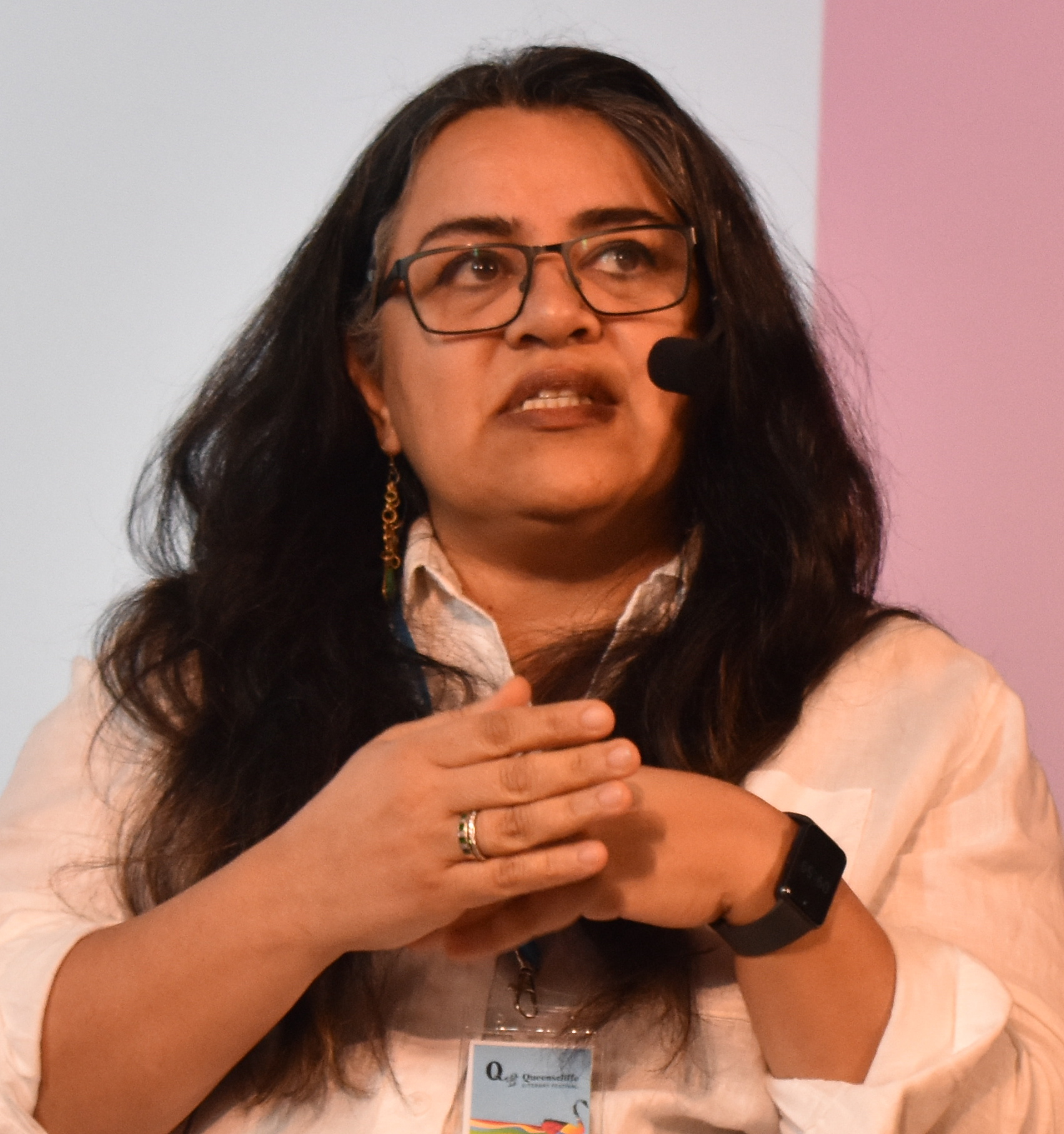
- Azar in 2025 at the Queenscliffe Literary Festival
- Born: 1972 (age 53–54); Iran
- Occupations: Author, journalist
- Notable work: The Enlightenment of the Greengage Tree

Shokoofeh Azar (Persian: شکوفه آذر; born 1972) is an Iranian-Australian author and journalist. Her novel The Enlightenment of the Greengage Tree was nominated for the Stella Prize and the International Booker Prize.

== Early life and education ==
Azar was born in Iran in 1972. Her father was an author and a poet. She studied literature in university before becoming a writer and journalist.

Sometime after her move to Australia in 2011, she graduated with a Bachelor of Communications with Honours via Deakin University.

== Early career ==
Azar began her career as an editor, and also wrote for a literary encyclopedia in Iran. She later worked as an editor for a newspaper, before taking up writing as a journalist.

As a journalist, she covered issues relating to human rights, in particular women's rights. She was arrested three times in connection with her work, which was often critical of the Iranian government, and had been placed in solitary confinement for a period of three months during one such arrest.

On advice from her family, she fled Iran to Turkey, and from there to Indonesia, from where she travelled by boat, arriving at an Australian refugee detention centre on Christmas Island in 2011. She was granted political asylum in Australia in 2011. She did not speak English upon her arrival in Australia, and learned the language as an adult.

== Writing ==
Azar's 2020 novel, The Enlightenment of the Greengage Tree, is set in Iran, deploying magic realism to narrate the incidents surrounding the life of a family in Iran during the 1979 Islamic Revolution. The novel was originally written in Persian, and was first published in English translation by the Wild Dingo Press in Australia in 2017. The translator has chosen to remain anonymous.

The novel was nominated for the Stella Prize in Australia in 2018. It was also on the shortlist for the International Booker Prize in 2020, and Azar is the first Iranian author to have been nominated for the prize. The book was republished for audiences outside Australia by Europa Editions.

== Publications ==
- Companion in Writing and Editing Essays
- Azar, Shokoofeh (2020). The Enlightenment of the Greengage Tree. Europa Editions. p. 272. ISBN 978-1-609-45565-1.
- Azar, Shokoofeh (2025). The Gowkaran Tree in the Middle of Our Kitchen. Europa Editions. p. 528. ISBN 979-8-889-66097-2.
- Azar, Shokoofeh (2022). "Why Iranians Continue to Seek Refuge in Australia". World Literature Today. 94 (3): 38–43. doi:10.1353/wlt.2020.0264.
- The woman who went to stand there., Westerly; Jun2014, Vol. 59 Issue 1, p18-24, 7p ISSN 0043-342X
- That's what its name is: Forget-me-not. Westerly; Jun2013, Vol. 58 Issue 1, p232-236, 5p ISSN 0043-342X
- Azar, Shokoofeh (2020). L'illuminazione del susino selvatico. p. 254.
- Azar, Shokoofeh (2021). Yaban Erigi Agacinda Gelen Aydinlanma. p. 300. ISBN 978-6-057-42102-9.

== Awards ==
- (1997) Best Book Award (Iran): for Companion in Writing and Editing Essays (in Persian)
- (2018) Stella Prize for Fiction: nominated for The Enlightenment of the Greengage Tree
- The River Woman. Westerly; Jun2013, Vol. 58 Issue 1, p237-243, 7p ISSN 0043-342X
- (2020) International Booker Prize for Fiction: nominated for The Enlightenment of the Greengage Tree
