= David Diop (novelist) =

French novelist and academic

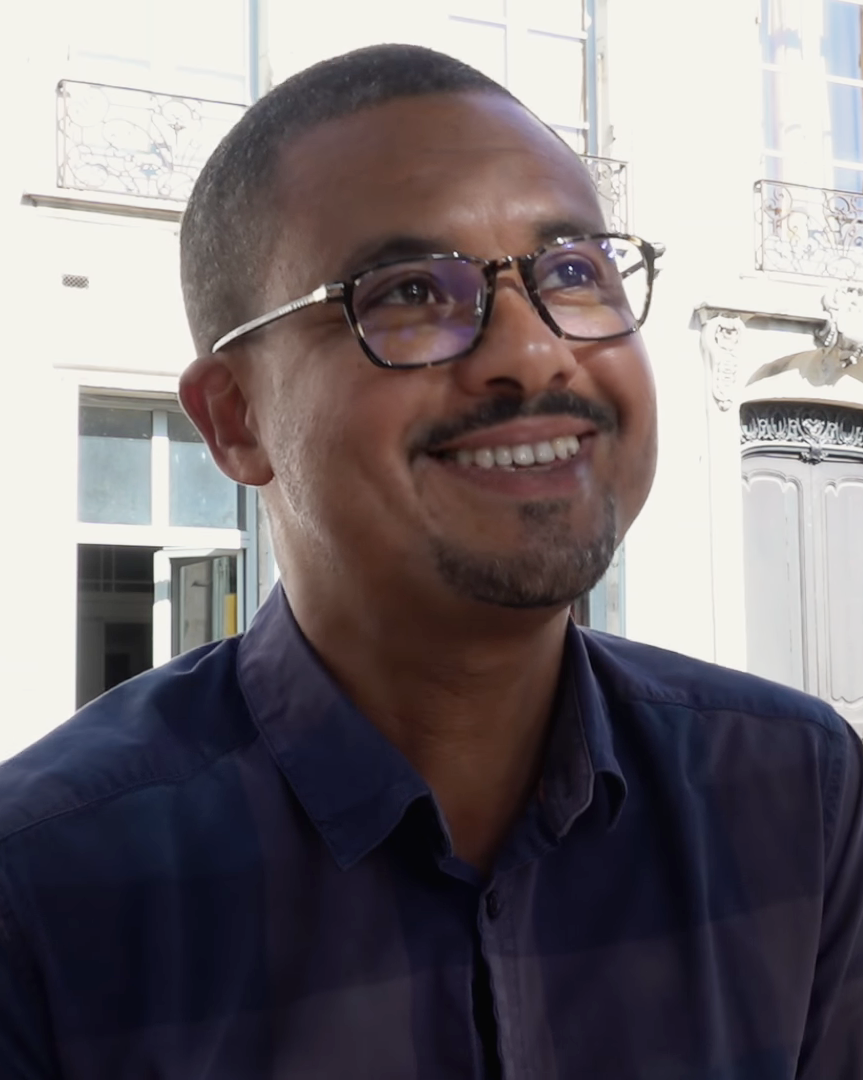
- Diop in 2018
- Born: 24 February 1966 (age 60); Paris, France
- Education: Paris-Sorbonne University
- Occupations: Novelist; academic
- Writing career
- Notable work: At Night All Blood Is Black
- Notable awards: International Booker Prize

David Diop (born 24 February 1966) is a French novelist and academic, who specializes in 18th-century French and Francophone African literature. His research, at the University of Pau in south-west France, focuses on representations of Africa in 18th-century accounts and images by travellers. Diop received the 2021 International Booker Prize for his novel At Night All Blood Is Black (translated by Anna Moschovakis), becoming the first French author to win the award. The novel was also shortlisted for ten French awards and won them in other countries.

== Biography ==
David Diop was born in Paris in 1966 to a French mother and a Senegalese father. He moved to Dakar at the age of five and spent the majority of his childhood in Senegal before returning to study in France at the age of 18 after finishing high school. Diop received a doctorate from the Sorbonne for his studies on 18th-century French literature.

In 1998, he became a lecturer in literature at the University of Pau and the Adour Region specialising in 18th-century French literature and African French literature. In 2009 he was appointed to head a research group on the representation of Africa and Africans in 17th- and 18th-century European literature. He received his habilitation in 2014. Diop now heads the arts, languages, and literature department at the university. He lives in Pau.

== Early works ==
He published his first book, a work of historical fiction titled 1889, l'Attraction universelle, in 2012. The novel describes the experiences of 11 members of a Senegalese delegation to the 1889 Exposition Universelle in Paris.

In 2018, he published his first full-length scholarly work, Rhétorique nègre au xviii^{e} siècle, which deals with the representation of Africans in 18th-century travel writing and abolitionist texts.

== At Night All Blood Is Black / Frère d'âme ==
Diop's second novel, Frère d'âme, which interweaves the history of World War I with the history of colonialism, was published in 2018. The novel describes the experiences of Senegalese Tirailleurs fighting for France in the trenches. The main character, Alfa Ndiaye, descends into madness following the death of a childhood friend and inflicts extreme brutality upon his German enemies. Diop was inspired to write the book by his French great-grandfather's service during the war. Diop stated "He never said anything to his wife, or to my mother, about his experience. That is why I was always very interested by all the tales and accounts which gave one access to a form of intimacy with that particular war." Because his great-grandfather refused to speak about the war Diop read many published accounts regarding the Tirailleurs' service.

Frère d'âme was shortlisted for the Prix Goncourt, the Prix Renaudot, the Prix Médicis and the Prix Femina and six other French literary prizes. In 2018 Diop received the Students' Prix Goncourt for the novel. He also won the Swiss Prix Ahmadou-Kourouma.

Frère d'âme was published in English translation in November 2020 under the title At Night All Blood Is Black. It won the 2020 Los Angeles Times Fiction Book Prize. Together with his translator Anna Moschovakis, with whom he split the £50,000 winnings, he won the 2021 International Booker Prize. This made him the first French author and first person of an African heritage to win the prize.

The novel has been translated into more than 30 languages. The Italian translation has won the Strega European Prize, and the Dutch translation has won the Europese Literatuurprijs.

== La Porte du voyage sans retour / Beyond the Door of No Return ==
Diop's third novel, Beyond the Door of No Return, is set in the early 1800s and deals with one Frenchman's obsession with the mysterious fate of an escaped slave in Senegal against the backdrop of the French colonial occupation. In September 2023 the English translation was longlisted for the National Book Award for Translated Literature.

In 2025, Beyond the Door of No Return made the longlist for the International Dublin Literary Award.

== Bibliography ==
- 1889, l'Attraction universelle (2012)
- Rhétorique nègre au XVIII^{e} siècle (2018)
- Frère d'âme (2018). At Night All Blood Is Black, trans. Anna Moschovakis (Farrar, Straus and Giroux / Pushkin Press, 2020)
- La Porte du voyage sans retour (2021). Beyond the Door of No Return, trans. Sam Taylor (Farrar, Straus and Giroux / Pushkin Press, 2023)
