= Wen-chin Ouyang =

Taiwanese academic

Wen-chin Ouyang, FBA (歐陽文津) is a professor of Arabic literature and comparative literature at SOAS, University of London.

== Early life and education ==
Ouyang was born in Taiwan and raised in Libya. She earned her bachelor's degree in the Arabic language from the University of Tripoli and completed her PhD in Middle Eastern studies at Columbia University in the United States. She taught Arabic studies at Columbia, the University of Chicago, and the University of Virginia before moving to the United Kingdom. Ouyang speaks both Arabic and Mandarin Chinese as a native speaker.

== Career ==
Most of Ouyang's written work focuses on early to middle Arabic literary criticism. She is the editor or co-editor of several academic journals within the field of Middle Eastern studies. She is also a regular contributor to Banipal. During the early 2000s, Ouyang was one of the organizers for a workshop series based on the "Genre, narrative and ideology" research program at SOAS.

In 2013, Ouyang was selected as a judge for the 2015 Man Booker International Prize.

In July 2018, Ouyang was elected a Fellow of the British Academy (FBA), the United Kingdom's national academy for the humanities and social sciences. She was the first Taiwan-born academic to receive the honour.

In 2022, she was elected an Academician of Academia Sinica.
