= Mazen Maarouf =

Palestinian-Icelandic writer, translator, and poet

- مازن معروف
- Born: 1978 (age 47–48); Beirut, Lebanon
- Citizenship: Iceland
- Education: BA in chemistry
- Alma mater: Lebanese University
- Occupation: Writer
- Years active: 2001–present

Mazen Maarouf (Arabic: مازن معروف) is a Palestinian writer who was born in 1978 in Beirut. He has more than five publications, and translated many novels from Icelandic into Arabic including the novels of several Icelandic writers. In 2019, his short story Jokes for the Gunmen was long-listed the Man Booker International Prize. Some of his poetry works and novels have been translated into many languages including English, French, Italian, and Spanish.

== Education and career ==
Mazen Maarouf was born in Beirut to a Palestinian family in 1978. He moved with his family to Tal Al-Zaatar at the beginning of the civil war in Lebanon, and is currently residing in Iceland. He studied at the Lebanese University and obtained a bachelor's degree from the college of Science in Chemistry. He worked as a teacher of chemistry and physics for several years before he shifted his career to literary field and journalism in 2001. Maarouf began his literary career first in poetry, where he published his first collection of poetry collection entitled "Our Grief Resembles Bread" in 2001. Then he published his second collection ‘The Camera Doesn't Capture Birds" in 2011, and after a year he published his third poetry collection "An Angel Suspended On a Clothesline". Some of his poems were translated into several languages, including English, Spanish, Italian, Icelandic, Norwegian, Maltese, Urdu, and Chinese.

Maarouf has also written art criticism, literary reviews and art critique for several Arabic newspapers and magazines including Al-Hayat, An-Nahar, Al-Arabi Al-Jadeed, and Qantara. He has translated many poems, novels, and short stories from Icelandic into Arabic such as "The Blue Fox" by Sjon, "Hands of my Father" by Myron Uhlberg, and "Flowers on the Roof" by Ingibjörg Sigurðardóttir. In 2015, Maarouf was awarded the LiteratureLana Prize for poetry in Italy and after a year he won Al-Multaqa prize for his short story collection "Jokes for the Gunmen’. The short story collection was also long-listed for Man Booker International Prize 2019, and for Edinburgh Book festival Award and shortlisted for Saif Ghobash Banipal Prize.

== Works ==
Some of his works include the following:

- Our Grief Resembles Bread, 2001
- The Camera Doesn’t Capture Birds, 2011
- An Angel Suspended On a Clothesline, 2012
- Jokes for the Gunmen, 2015
- Sunshine on the substitute bench, 2022

=== Translations ===
- The Blue Fox by Sjón
- Hands of my Father by Myron Uhlberg
- The Story of the Blue Planet by Andri Snaer Magnason
- Dwarfstone by Adalsteinn Asberg
- Flowers on the Roof by Ingibjörg Sigurðardóttir
- Fido by Brian Pilkington

== Awards and nominations ==
- 2015: Marrouf was awarded the LiteratureLana Prize for Poetry in Italy.
- 2016: He Won Al-Multaqa Prize for his short story collection "Jokes for the Gunmen".
- 2019: His short story collection "Jokes for the Gunmen" was long-listed for Man Booker International Prize.
- 2019: His short story collection "Jokes for the Gunmen" was long-listed for Edinburgh Book Festival Awards.
- 2019: His short story collection "Jokes for the Gunmen" was shortlisted for Saif Ghobash Banipal Prize.
