= Standing Heavy =

2014 novel by GauZ'

- Original French language version titled Debout-Payé translated to English as Standing Heavy
- Author: GauZ'
- Original title: Debout-Payé
- Translator: Frank Wynne
- Language: French
- Genre: Satire, Literary fiction
- Publisher: MacLehose Press
- Publication date: 2014
- Publication place: Côte d'Ivoire
- English publication date: 2022
- Pages: 168 pp
- ISBN: 978-1-529-41443-1

Standing Heavy is a novel by Ivorian author GauZ'. Originally published in 2014 in French (as Debout-Payé), it was translated into English by Frank Wynne and published in 2022.

It was shortlisted for the International Booker Prize 2023.

== Plot ==
The novel follows a series of undocumented Ivorian immigrants in Paris who find work as security guards. Their constant observations provides a cutting commentary on colonial legacies, Western capitalism and Franco-African history.

The title refers to "all the various professions that require the employee to remain standing in order to earn a pittance".

== Critical response ==
Standing Heavy was shortlisted for the International Booker Prize 2023.

Writing in The Guardian, John Self said "This inventive and very funny debut novel offers a whistle-stop, whizz-bang tour of Franco-African history."

Berny Sèbe, in the Conversation, said Standing Heavy offers a "refreshing and often caustic take on the cultural and economic consequences of an encounter between western consumerism and capitalism and the acute African sense of observation and derision."
