= Sara Stridsberg =

Swedish author and playwright (born 1972)

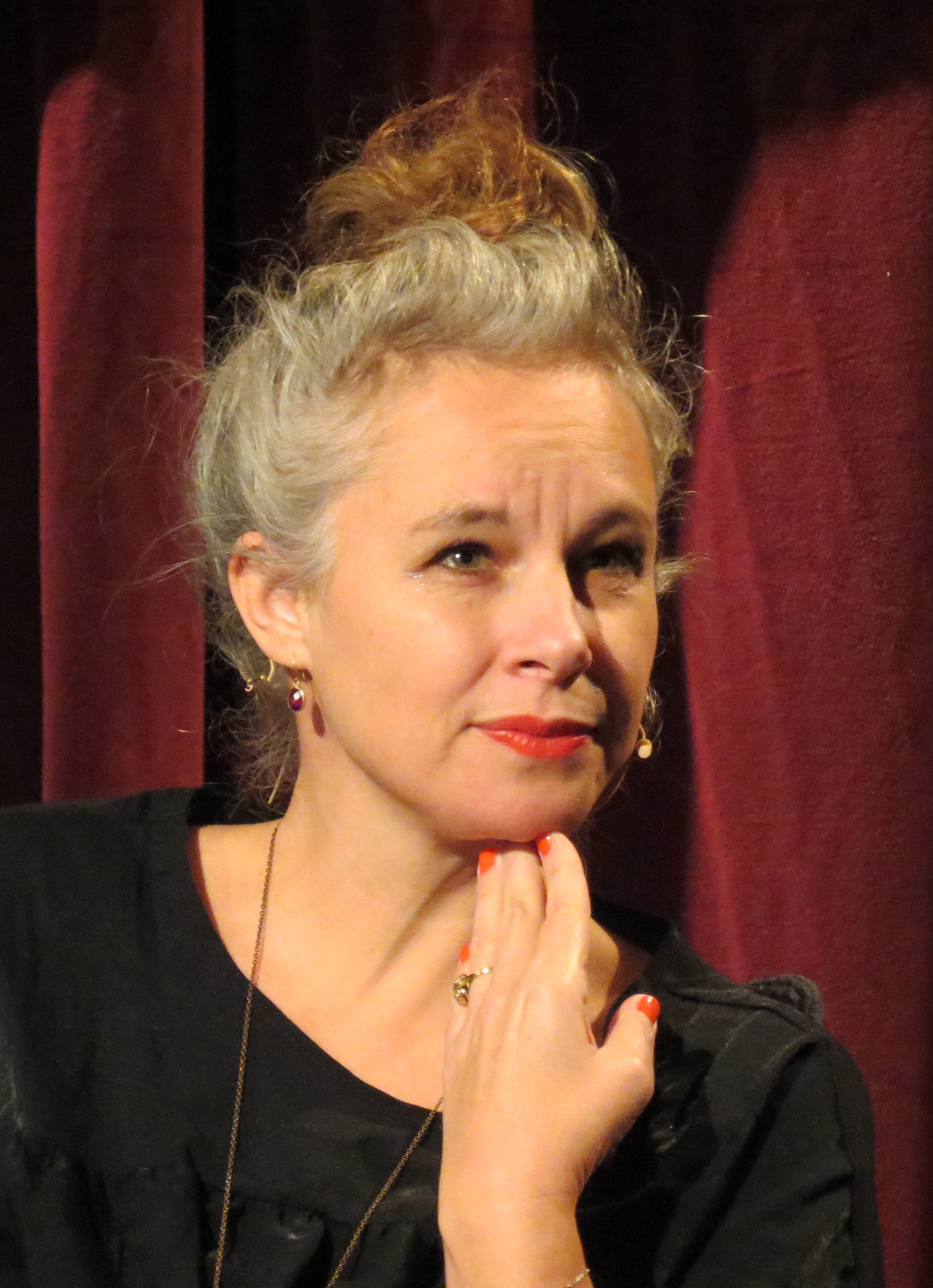
- Stridsberg in 2018
- Born: Sara Brita Stridsberg; 29 August 1972 (age 54); Solna, Sweden
- Writing career
- Period: 1999–
- Notable works: Drömfakulteten; Darling River; Beckomberga. Ode till min familj.
- Notable awards: Nordic Council Literature Prize (2007); European Union Prize for Literature (2015)

Member of the Swedish Academy (Seat No. 13)
- In office 20 December 2016 – 7 May 2018
- Preceded by: Gunnel Vallquist
- Succeeded by: Anne Swärd

Sara Brita Stridsberg (born 29 August 1972) is a Swedish author and playwright. Her first novel, Happy Sally, was about Sally Bauer, who in 1939 had become the first Scandinavian woman to swim the English Channel.

Her big international breakthrough came with the publication of the novel The Faculty of Dreams/Valerie in 2006 . The novel received the Nordic Council Award in 2007, and was nominated to the Man Booker award when published 2019 in the UK and US. Her novels are today translated into 25 languages.

In 2007, she was awarded the Nordic Council Literature Prize for her novel Drömfakulteten (Valerie, or The Faculty of Dreams), which is her second novel and a fictitious story about Valerie Solanas, who wrote the SCUM Manifesto, which Stridsberg has translated into Swedish. The English translation by Deborah Bragan-Turner was longlisted for the 2019 International Booker Prize. Other acclaimed novels are Beckomberga/The Gravity of Love 2014, Darling River 2010, Antarctica of Love 2018 (longlisted for the Dublin Award 2023, longlisted for the National Translation Award in Prose 2023), Farewell to Panic Beach 2024.

She has been awarded many literature prizes, among them the Nordic Council Prize, the European Union Prize for Literature, the Dobloug Prize, De Nios Winter Prize and De Nios, the Selma Lagerlöf Prize and has been nominated for the August Prize five times.

Svenska Dagbladet called Stridsberg "one of our foremost nature poets" and considered her among the best in contemporary Swedish literature while noting that Stridsberg's novels are always discomforting to read.

In 2016, Stridsberg was elected to the 13th chair on the Swedish Academy and the Nobel Committee previously occupied by Gunnel Vallquist. She was inducted into the Academy on 20 December 2016. In connection with the academy's crisis in the wake of #MeToo, she requested to resign, which was granted on May 7, 2018.

Sara Stridsberg is also active as a playwright, with plays such as Medealand, Dissecting a Snowfall, The Art of Falling, Wounded Angel, Beckomberga, American hotel, Valerie Jean Solanas will be president in America, A Grave for Two – Antigone in Kolonos and Vertigo. Her plays have often had their world premieres at The Royal Theatre in Stockholm.

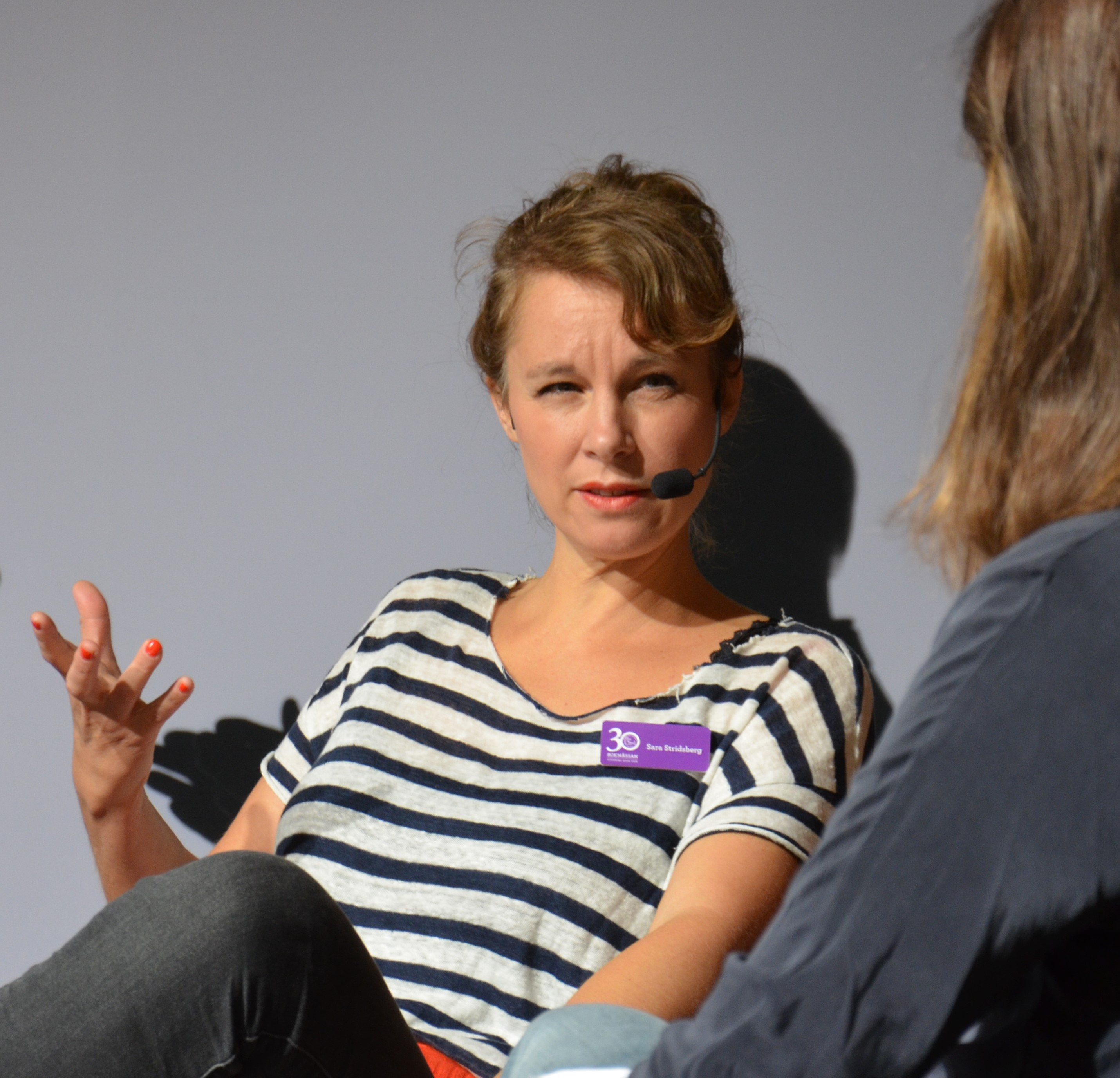
Stridsberg is interviewed at Bokmässan in Gothenburg, 2014

== Awards ==
- 2013 Dobloug Prize from The Swedish Academy
- 2010 Visiting professor Free University of Berlin
- 2015 European Union Prize for Literature (Sweden) for Beckomberga: Ode till min familj (The Gravity of Love)
- 2004 The Sveriges Essäfond Prize
- 2006 Aftonbladet's Literature Prize
- 2007 Nordic Council Literature Prize
- 2010 – The Magazine Vi:s literature award
- 2015 – Samfundet de Nio's Grand Prize
- 2015 – The Aniara Literature Prize
- 2015 – The Berns Literature Prize
- 2016 – Selma Lagerlöf Literature Prize
- 2018 – Moa-priset
- 2019 – Swedish Radio novel prize
- 2025 – Pär Lagerkvists Literature Prize

Stridsberg has also been nominated for the August Prize five times: four times in the fiction category with The Faculty of Dreams (2006), Darling River (2010), Medealand (2012), and Beckomberga (2014), and once in the children's and young adult literature category together with Sara Lundberg for Summer of Diving (2019).”

== Translated works in English ==
- Valerie, or The Faculty of Dreams: A Novel (Farrar, Straus and Giroux, 2019)
- The Faculty of Dreams (MacLehose press, 2019)
- The Antarctica of Love (Farrar, Straus and Giroux 2022 in the US, MacLehose Press in England 2021)
- Beckomberga/The Gravity of Love (MacLehose press 2016 in England, Farrar, Straus and Giroux in January 2026)
- Summer of Diving (children's book, Seven Stories in the US)
- Hunter in Huskvarna, short stories (MacLehose press 2023)
- We go to the Parc (children's book, Seven Stories in the US)

== Bibliography in Swedish ==
- Det är bara vi som är ute och åker (non-fiction, 2002)
- Happy Sally (novel, 2004)
- Drömfakulteten (novel, 2006)
- Darling River (novel, 2010)
- Mamman och havet (children's book, 2012)
- Medealand och andra pjäser (2012)
- Beckomberga: Ode till min familj (novel, 2014)
- Nelly Sachs kommer aldrig fram till havet (2016)
- Kärlekens Antarktis (novel, 2018)
- Dyksommar (children's book, 2019)
- Hunter i Huskvarna (novel, 2021)
- Vi går till parken (children's book)
- Lilla Varg (children's book)
- Farväl till Panic Beach (novel, 2024)

== Plays ==
- 2006 – Valerie Jean Solanas ska bli president i Amerika
- 2009 – Medealand
- 2012 – Dissection of Snowfall
- 2015 – Beckomberga
- 2015 – The Art of Falling
- 2016 – American Hotel
- 2021 – Wounded Angel
- 2024 – Vertigo
- 2024 – A grave for two - Antigone in Kolonos

Cultural offices
| Preceded by Gunnel Vallquist | Swedish Academy, Seat No.13; 2016–2018 | Succeeded by Anne Swärd |
