= The Nights Are Quiet in Tehran =

Shida Bayzar novel

- Author: Shida Bazyar
- Translator: Ruth Martin
- Publisher: Scribe UK
- Publication date: April 29, 2025
- Pages: 228
- ISBN: 978-1761386008

The Nights Are Quiet in Tehran is a novel by Shida Bazyar. Originally published in German, it was translated to English by Ruth Martin and published by Scribe UK in April 2025. It was shortlisted for the International Booker Prize in 2026.

== Critical reception ==
Necessary Fiction concluded that "Bazyar's epic is a reminder that political events reverberate beyond the public sphere; these are also private matters, playing out in conversations in kitchens and bedrooms, and with neighbors over the grill."

European Literature Network noted the book's polyphonic structure and lauded its "deeply felt personal experiences—the growing fear of political persecution in Iran, the love of family, the alienation and cultural loss felt in Germany."

The Saturday Paper stated that "A quietly beautiful exploration of the trauma of losing one's homeland to a savage regime, the novel is testament to how hope and the revolutionary spirit endure in the face of crushing tyranny, how courage cannot be fully stamped out. It lies dormant, awaiting a time when it can again ignite new acts of bravery, new waves of revolution."
