= Ernst-Toller-Preis =

Ernst-Toller-Preis is a Bavarian literary prize, awarded every two years in the name of Ernst Toller. The prize money is €5,000.

== Recipients ==
- 1997 Albert Ostermaier
- 1999 Biljana Srbljanovic
- 2001 Felix Mitterer
- 2003 Juli Zeh
- 2007 Günter Grass
- 2009 Gerhard Polt
- 2013 Christoph Ransmayr
- 2015 Katja Petrowskaja
- 2016 Roman Ehrlich
- 2018 Wolf Biermann
- 2021 Gertraud Klemm
- 2023 Shida Bazyar
- 2025 Jagoda Marinić
