= Anna Moschovakis =

American poet, author, and translator

- Occupation: Poet, author, translator
- Education: University of California at Berkeley; Bard College; CUNY Graduate Center
- Years active: 2001–present
- Notable awards: 2021 International Booker Prize

Website
- badutopian.com

Anna Elizabeth Moschovakis is a Greek American poet, author, and translator.

== Early life ==
Moschovakis was born to an American mother and a Greek father. She split her time growing up between the U.S. and Greece, where her father owned what she described as "a small apartment in a port-side suburb on the outskirts of Athens". She has one brother. She received a BA in philosophy from the University of California at Berkeley, an MFA from the Milton Avery Graduate School of the Arts at Bard College, and an MA in comparative literature (French and American) from the CUNY Graduate Center.

== Career ==
Moschovakis is a founding member of Bushel Collective and the publishing collective Ugly Duckling Presse. She is a faculty member of Bard College's Milton Avery Graduate School of the Arts, as well as an adjunct associate professor in the Writing MFA program at Pratt Institute. Her writing has appeared in The Paris Review, The Believer and The Iowa Review.

Moschovakis' book of poetry, You and Three Others Are Approaching a Lake, won the James Laughlin Award in 2011. Her first novel, Eleanor, or, The Rejection of the Progress of Love, was published in 2018 and was called "remarkable" by the Los Angeles Review of Books.

Moschovakis translated David Diop's 2018 novel At Night All Blood Is Black from French into English. The author and Moschovakis were awarded the 2021 International Booker Prize.

== Personal life ==
Moschovakis lives in South Kortright, New York.

== Bibliography ==
=== Poetry ===
- I Have Not Been Able to Get Through to Everyone (2006)
- Some Notes from the Last 90 Years, or, The Tragedy of Waste (2007)
- You and Three Others Are Approaching a Lake (2011)
- Anna's Half: Poems & Things (with Anselm Berrigan) (2013)
- They and We Will Get Into Trouble for This (2016)
- from Preliminary Notes on Risk (2022)

=== Novels ===
- Eleanor, or, The Rejection of the Progress of Love (2018)
- Participation (2022)
- An Earthquake is a Shaking of the Surface of the Earth (2024)

=== Translations ===
- The Engagement by Georges Simenon (2007)
- The Possession by Annie Ernaux (2008)
- The Jokers by Albert Cossery (2010)
- Commentary by Marcelle Sauvageo (2013, with Christine Schwartz Hartley)
- Bresson on Bresson (2017)
- At Night All Blood Is Black by David Diop (2020)

== Awards and honors ==
- Edward F. Albee Foundation (2001)
- New York Foundation for the Arts fellowship (2009)
- Howard Fellowship from Brown University's Howard Foundation (2015)
- Los Angeles Times Fiction Book Prize (2020)
- International Booker Prize (Translation) (2021)
