= Beyond the Ocean =

- French release poster
- Directed by: Éliane de Latour
- Written by: Éliane de Latour
- Produced by: Arte; Cinéma La République de Côte d'Ivoire; C.N.R.S. Images; Les Films d'ici Autonomous Limited
- Starring: Fraser James; Djedje Apali; Marie-Josée Croze
- Cinematography: Renaud Chassaing
- Edited by: Nelly Quettier; Yves Dechamps; Catherine Gouz
- Music by: Alexi Pecharman; Eric Thomas
- Distributed by: Shellac Distribution (France)
- Release dates: 15 February 2006 (Berlin); 8 July 2009 (France)
- Running time: 108 minutes
- Countries: Côte d'Ivoire; France; United Kingdom
- Language: French

Beyond the Ocean (French release titles: Les Oiseaux du ciel and Après l'océan) is a 2006 film directed by Éliane de Latour. Latour also co-wrote the screenplay with GauZ'. The film showed in the Panorama section of the 56th Berlin International Film Festival in February 2006. It also showed at the 2006 Edinburgh International Film Festival.

== Plot ==
Otho and Shad leave Abidjan to try their luck in Europe. They have a dream, to return to their country as heroes. However, exile is not a bed of roses. Once in Spain, Otho is arrested and deported to Côte d'Ivoire without attaining his goal. His former friends turn their backs on him. Shad manages to make his way to England where he meets Tango, a young rebellious Frenchwoman. The two lovers lean on each other for support, but the obstacles they must overcome are numerous.

== Cast ==
- Fraser James as Shad
- Djedje Apali as Otho
- Marie-Josée Croze as Tango
- Sara Martins as Olga
- Lucien Jean-Baptiste as Tetanos
- Tella Kpomahou as Pelagie
- Malik Zidi as Bruno
- Agnès Soral as The White
- Kad Merad as Oncle de Tango
- Luce Mouchel – Tante de Tango
- Michel Bohiri as Père d'Otho
- Angeline Nadié as Mère d'Otho
- Gabriel Zahon as Père de Shad
- Toupé Loué as Baudelaire
