= Anne Serre =

French writer (born 1960)

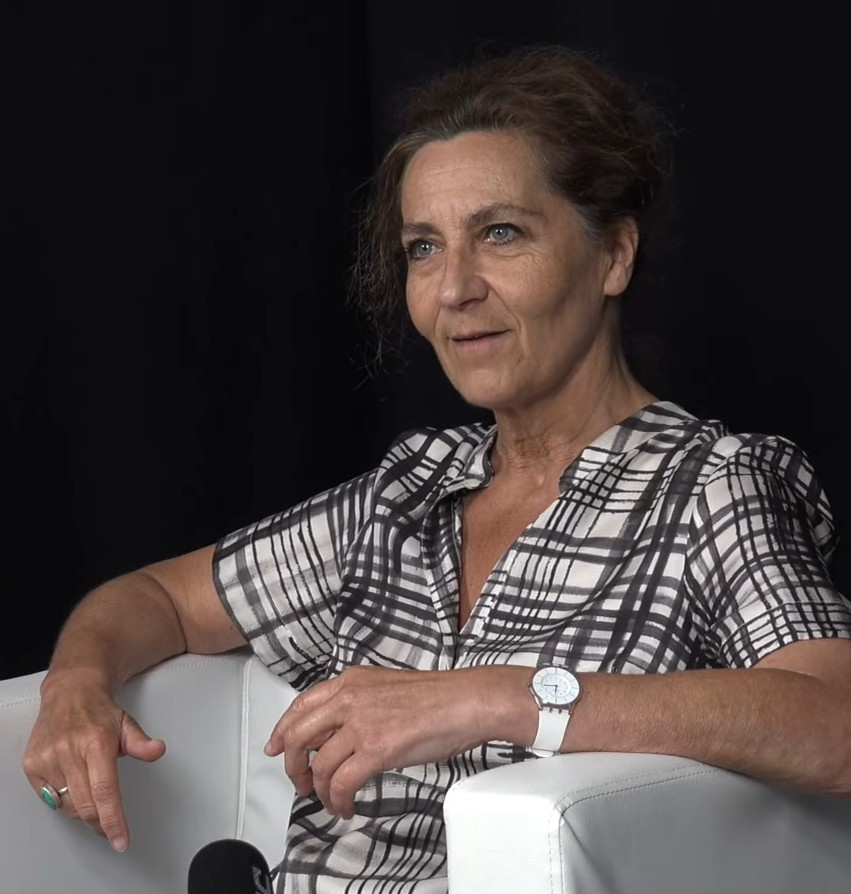
Anne Serre

Anne Serre (born September 7, 1960) is a French writer of novels and short stories. She was born in Bordeaux. She has written more than a dozen books, four of which have been translated into English. She has won the Prix Goncourt de la Nouvelle and has been shortlisted for the International Booker Prize.

== Writing career ==
Serre's debut novel Les Gouvernantes came out in 1992. The English translation by Mark Hutchinson was published in 2018. Cleveland Review of Books reviewed the English translation and called it "surreal and erotic." Hutchinson has since translated three further works by Serre, all published by New Directions.

In 2008 Serre won a Cino del Duca Foundation award.

Her 2011 novel, Les débutants, the story of a love triangle between Anna, Guillaume, and Thomas, was translated into English in 2021 by Mark Hutchinson as The Beginners.

A collection of three of Serre's novellas, translated by Hutchinson, was published in 2021 as The Fool and Other Moral Tales. It consists of three novellas originally published in French as Le Mat (2005), Le Narrateur (2004), and Petite Table, Sois Mise! (2012). The version of Le Narrateur that appears here was shortened by Serre from the original version.

Her 2020 short story collection, Au coeur d’un été tout en or, was awarded the Prix Goncourt de la Nouvelle. The collection, drawing on the writer's twenties and thirties, has been described as an autoportrait. An English translation by Mark Hutchinson of a story from the collection, "That Summer", appeared in The Paris Review in 2024. This very short story describes the dynamics between four members of a family, two of whom are institutionalised.

In 2025, A Leopard-Skin Hat, Mark Hutchinson's translation of Serre's 2008 novel, Un chapeau léopard, was shortlisted for the International Booker Prize. The story of an intense relationship between the narrator and a childhood friend, Fanny, who suffers from profound psychological disorders, it was written after the death of Serre's sister.

Among Serre's notable works not translated into English are Voyage avec Vila-Matas (2017), featuring a fictionalised version of Spanish writer Enrique Vila-Matas, Grande tiqueté (2020), for which Serre invented a language, and Notre si chère vieille dame auteur (2022), in which a writer near death works on an abandoned manuscript.
