= Jente Posthuma =

Dutch writer (born 1974)

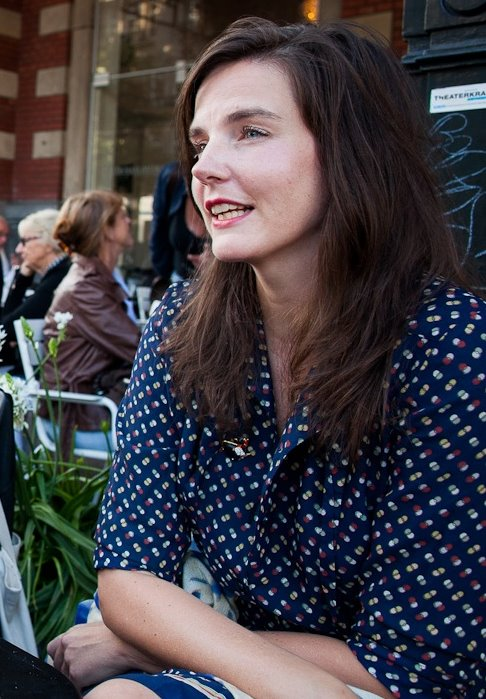
Jente Posthuma (2018)

Jente Posthuma (born in Enschede, August 16, 1974) is a Dutch writer.

== Biography ==
She studied French and literature at the University of Utrecht and the Université Paris Diderot.

After her studies she worked as a journalist, doing long interviews for De Groene Amsterdammer, NRC and de Volkskrant. She also published short stories for publications such as De Revisor, Hollands Maandblad, Das Magazin, Oogst and De Gids. In 2012, she won the A.L. Snijdersprijs for the best short story.

In 2016, Posthuma published her first novel (Mensen zonder uitstraling). It was nominated for the Dioraphte Literatour Prijs and the Hebban Debuutprijs, and also reached the longlist of ANV Debutantenprijs. Working with her husband, the photographer Bas Uterwijk, she made the photobook Probeer een beetje goed over me te denken in 2016, about the suicide of her father-in-law, the actor Henk Uterwijk. Her second novel appeared in 2020. The Dutch title was Waar ik liever niet aan denk; the English translation was called What I'd Rather Not Think About. The book was nominated for the European Union Prize for Literature (2021) and also the International Booker Prize (2024). Her third book Heks! Heks! Heks! is a retelling of three Middle Ages stories about witches from the Dutch region of Overijssel.
