= Dahlia de la Cerda =

Mexican writer (born 1985)

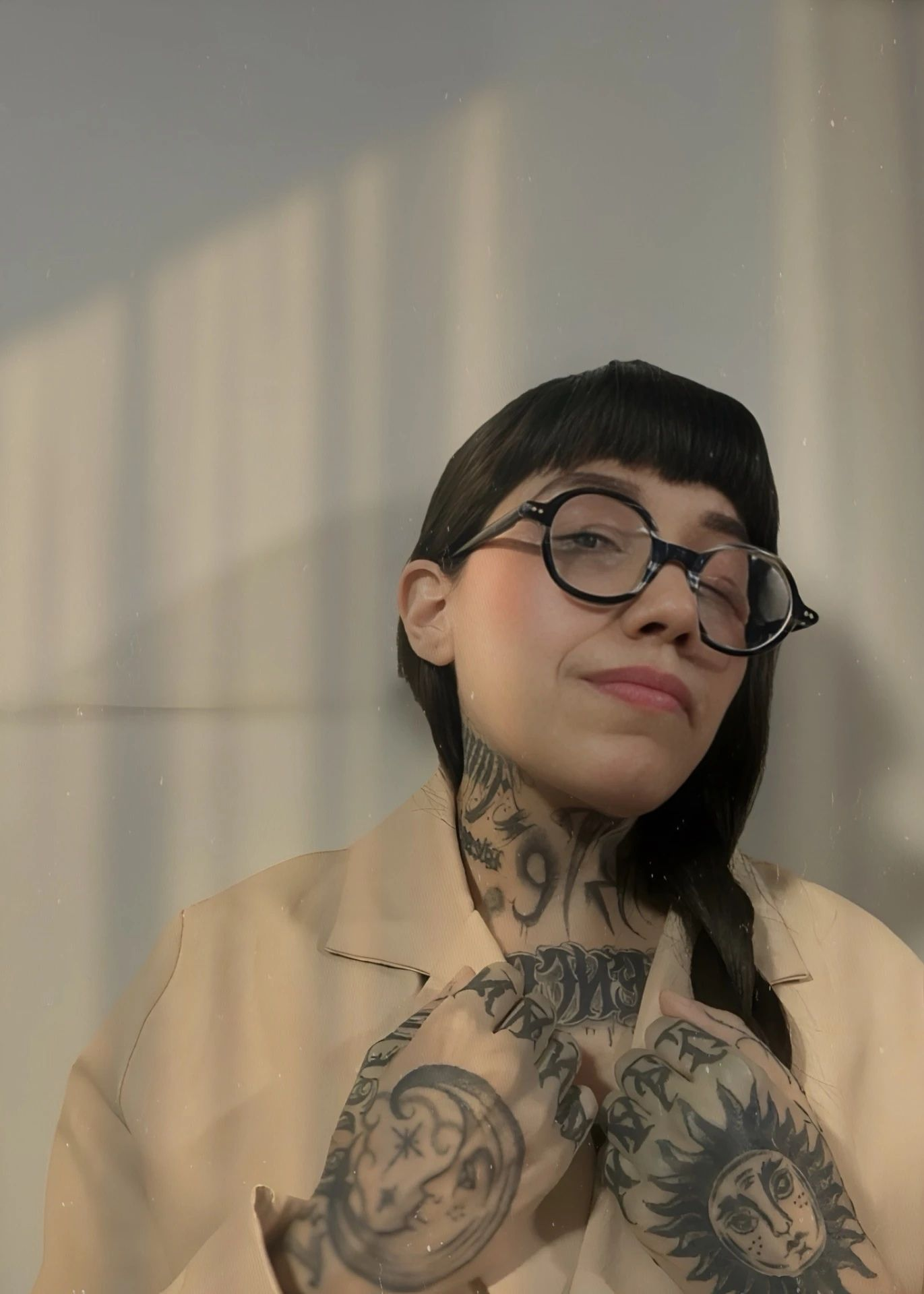
- Dahlia de la Cerda in 2025
- Born: 1985 (age 40–41); Aguascalientes, Mexico
- Writing career
- Language: Spanish
- Notable work: Reservoir Bitches

Dahlia de la Cerda (born 1985) is a Mexican writer and activist. In 2025, her book, Reservoir Bitches, was longlisted for the International Booker Prize.

== Biography ==
De la Cerda was born and lives in the city of Aguascalientes. She has Neurofibromatosis type I and severe scoliosis, and additionally was diagnosed with borderline personality disorder. She studied philosophy in university and worked in a call center. She began to write about violence against women after her family suffered a feminicide.

She is a founder of the organization Morras Help Morras, which helps women seeking abortion in Mexico.

== Works ==
- Perras de reserva (Reservoir Bitches)
- Desde los zulos (From the Hiding Places), 2023
- Medea me cantó un corrido (Medea sang me a corrido), 2024

== Awards and honors ==
- Finalist of the 2024 Premio de Narrativa Breve Ribera del Duero for Medea me ayudó a abortar (Medea helped me abort)
- Longlisted for the 2025 International Booker Prize for Reservoir Bitches, translated by Heather Cleary and Julia Sanches.
