= At Night All Blood Is Black =

2018 novel by David Diop

- First edition cover
- Author: David Diop
- Audio read by: Dion Graham (EN)
- Translator: Anna Moschovakis (EN)
- Language: French
- Genre: Literary fiction
- Publisher: Le Seuil (FRA); Pushkin Press (UK); FSG (US)
- Publication date: 16 August 2018 (FR)
- Publication place: France
- English publication date: 5 November 2020 (UK); 10 November 2020 (US)
- Media type: Print, ebook, audiobook
- Pages: 178 pp (1st French ed.)
- ISBN: 9782021398243 (1st French ed.)
- OCLC: 1048744721
- Dewey Decimal: 843/.914
- LC Class: PQ3989.2.D563 F7413 2020

At Night All Blood Is Black (French: Frère d'âme, lit. 'Soul brother') is a novel by French author David Diop. First published in French on August 16, 2018, by Éditions du Seuil, it won the Prix Goncourt des Lycéens that same year.

The English translation by Anna Moschovakis won the 2021 International Booker Prize. It was published in the UK by Pushkin Press and in the US by Farrar, Straus and Giroux.

== Plot ==
Alfa Ndiaye and his adopted brother Mademba Diop are Senegalese Tirailleurs fighting in World War I. One day, Alfa jokes about the Diop family's totem, the peacock, stating that it is cowardly when compared to the Ndiaye family's lion. Wanting to prove his bravery, Mademba charges into battle and is disemboweled. Mademba repeatedly asks Alfa to kill him, but Alfa is unable to do so. After Mademba's death, Alfa captures German soldiers and disembowels them. When they beg for death, he kills them, granting them a mercy he was unable to give to Mademba. He then brings their severed hands and rifles back to camp.

At first, he is hailed as a hero for his bravery, but his fellow soldiers quickly realize that he is spiraling into madness and become afraid of him. After the seventh severed hand, the commander orders Alfa to take one month's leave. While being treated in a psychiatric hospital by Dr. François, Alfa reminisces about his childhood and life in Senegal. He buries his collection of mummified hands, then rapes and kills Dr. François's daughter.

The narrative abruptly shifts to recount a Senegalese story about a fickle princess and a sorcerer without scars. The narrative meditates on the meaning of stories within stories and the difficulty of translation. The narrator speaks in the voice of Mademba, believing he is now living in Alfa's body.

== Critical reception ==
RFI called the original book "incisive and scathing", noting Diop's "very direct" style. Le Monde viewed it as a subversive story endowed with "undeniable literary qualities", appropriately published in time for the centenary of the armistice that ended the war. Angelique Chrisafis in The Guardian said the book was "heartbreaking and poetic". Suzi Feay in The Spectator wrote of the novel as "powerful" and "full of echoes and portents". In The New York Times, Laura Cappelle praised the work for contributing to a "reckoning with colonial history in French fiction", and Chigozie Obioma described it as an "extraordinary" novel about a "bloody stain on human history". Anna Branach-Kallas argued that the novel commemorates the contribution of African French Army soldiers in the First World War by stressing their vulnerability and their traumatic transformation on the front lines. Mehrul Bari in The Daily Star wrote, "One can find here the classic idiosyncrasies of African stories—the charms, the wisdoms—most noticeably in the characterisation of Alfa, who resembles heroic, boastful narrators like The Palm-Wine Drinkard's, who are casually able to perform fantastical feats without a second thought."

The novel was a 2018 finalist for the four major French literary prizes (Goncourt, Médicis, Femina, Renaudot). On November 15, 2018, it was finally awarded the Prix Goncourt des Lycéens in the second round of voting by five votes over Le Malheur du bas by Inès Bayard and La Vraie Vie by Adeline Dieudonné.

The novel has been translated into more than 30 languages. The English translation by the American poet Anna Moschovakis is titled At Night All Blood Is Black. It won the International Booker Prize in 2021, making Diop the first French writer to receive this award.

=== Awards ===
- Prix Goncourt des Lycéens 2018
- Prix Patrimoines 2018
- Globe de Cristal Award for best novel 2019
- Prix Ahmadou-Kourouma 2019
- Prix des lecteurs lycéens de l'Escale du livre 2019
- Strega Europe Prize 2019
- Los Angeles Times Book Prize fiction category 2020
- International Booker Prize 2021
