= Eleanor Wachtel =

Canadian writer and broadcaster (born 1947)

Eleanor Wachtel OC
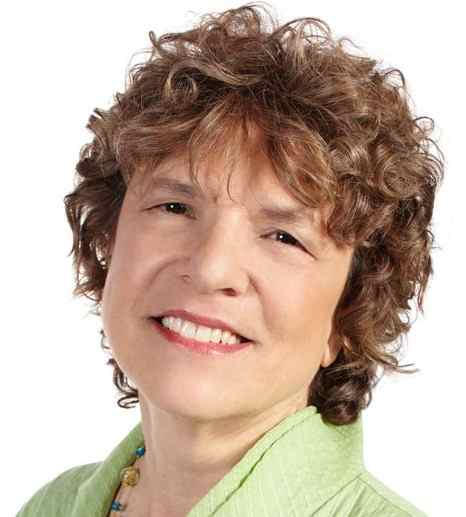
- Born: 1947 (age 78–79); Montreal, Quebec, Canada
- Occupation: Broadcaster

Eleanor Wachtel OC (born 1947 in Montreal, Quebec) is a Canadian writer and broadcaster. She was the host of the flagship literary program Writers & Company on CBC Radio One, which ran for 33 years. Her interviews for Writers & Company are in-depth portraits of literary figures who over the years have included Zadie Smith, Ian McEwan, Saul Bellow, Margaret Atwood, Michael Ondaatje and Nadine Gordimer. Kazuo Ishiguro, the Nobel Prize-winning author of Remains of the Day, has called Wachtel "one of the very finest interviewers of authors I've come across anywhere in the world." At the end of their conversation in 2013, John le Carré told her, "You do it better than anyone I know."

== Early life ==
Wachtel was born in Montreal, Canada, in 1947. Interested in books and reading from an early age, she was introduced by her Grade 8 teacher to the works of Shakespeare and Emily Brontë. She studied English literature at McGill University, where she worked for the student newspaper and was on the executive of the Undergraduate Literary Society.

Following McGill, Wachtel enrolled ("partly by default", she says) in a master's program in journalism at Syracuse University. On graduation, she accompanied her anthropologist husband to Kenya.

== Career ==
After stints in Kenya and the United States, she moved in the mid-1970s to Vancouver, where she worked as a freelance writer and broadcaster. During this time, she was adjunct professor of women's studies at Simon Fraser University. In the fall of 1987, Wachtel became literary commentator on CBC Stereo's State of the Arts in Toronto. Her next assignment for CBC was as writer-broadcaster for The Arts Tonight and reporter for The Arts Report. From 1996 to 2007, she was the host of The Arts Today.

Wachtel co-founded Writers & Company with her long-time producer Sandra Rabinovitz in 1990, becoming the show's exclusive host from its inception. By the following year, the 60-minute interview format that would become its defining feature was set in stone.

A selection of Wachtel's interviews, titled Writers & Company, was published in 1993. This was followed by More Writers & Company, published by Knopf Canada in the fall of 1996. In 2003, another selection of her interviews, titled Original Minds, was published by HarperCollins. In 2016, Biblioasis released The Best of Writers & Company on the 25th anniversary of the show's creation.

After 33 years of hosting Writers & Company, Wachtel announced her retirement in the spring of 2023.

The season's final original episode, recorded live at the CBC's Glenn Gould Studio in Toronto, aired on June 16, 2023.

In 2024, Simon Fraser University announced that Writers and Company's entire catalogue would be digitally archived and made freely accessible in the library's special collections. The archive features over 1,000 hours of interviews with writers, of which 14 are Nobel Prize for Literature laureates.

Wachtel was named chair of the International Booker Prize jury in 2024.

She is a contributor to the best-selling book Dropped Threads (2001), edited by Carol Shields and Marjorie Anderson, and Lost Classics (2000), edited by Michael Ondaatje and others.

In 2007, she published Random Illuminations: Conversations With Carol Shields, which won an Independent Publisher Book Award.

She has co-edited two books: The Expo Story (1986) and Language in Her Eye (1990), and is the co-author of A Feminist Guide to the Canadian Constitution (1992).

Wachtel was the creator and host of Wachtel on the Arts, a monthly interview show on CBC's Ideas from 2007 to 2017.

== Awards and honours ==
In 2004, Wachtel was appointed a Member of the Order of Canada. In 2014, she was promoted to Officer.

Wachtel has been awarded nine honorary degrees, including a Doctor of Literature from Carleton University in Ottawa (2017), a Doctor of Laws from Concordia University in Montreal (2010), a Doctor of Letters from McGill University in Montreal (2009), a Doctor of Laws, from Dalhousie University in Halifax (2007), and the Doctor of Letters (D.Litt.) from Simon Fraser University, Burnaby, B.C. (2007); Mount Saint Vincent University, Halifax (2002); Emily Carr University of Art and Design, Vancouver (2001); Athabasca University, Athabasca, Alberta (2000); St. Thomas University, Fredericton (1999).

In 2015, Wachtel was named to the Women's Executive Network's 100 Most Powerful Women list in the Arts & Communication field.

In 2011, Writers & Company won a Silver Prize at the New York Festivals for World's Best Radio Programs.
