= International Booker Prize =

International literary award

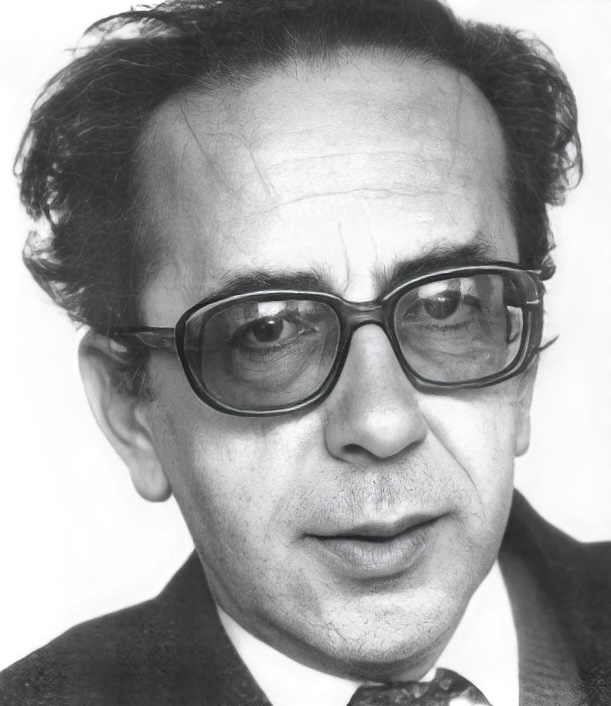
- Inaugural winner Ismail Kadare
- Awarded for: Best work of fiction translated into English and published in the UK or Ireland
- Country: United Kingdom
- Presented by: Booker Prize Foundation
- Rewards: £100,000 £50,000 (2016–2026)
- First award: 2005; 21 years ago
- Website: thebookerprizes.com/the-international-booker-prize

The Bukhman International Booker Prize (formerly known as the Man Booker International Prize, and the International Booker Prize prior to 2026) is an international literary award hosted in the United Kingdom. The introduction of the International Prize to complement the Man Booker Prize, as the Booker Prize was then known, was announced in June 2004. Sponsored by the Man Group, from 2005 until 2015 the award was given every two years to a living author of any nationality for a body of work published in English or generally available in English translation. It rewarded one author's "continued creativity, development and overall contribution to fiction on the world stage", and was a recognition of the writer's body of work rather than any one title.

Since 2016, the award has been given annually to a single novel or collection of short stories, translated into English and published in the United Kingdom or Ireland, with a £50,000 prize for the winning title, shared equally between author and translator. From 2027 onwards, the prize will be doubled to £100,000.

Crankstart, the charitable foundation of Sir Michael Moritz and his wife Harriet Heyman, began supporting The Booker Prizes on 1 June 2019. From this date, the prizes were known as The Booker Prize and The International Booker Prize. Of their support for The Booker Prize Foundation and the prizes, Moritz commented: "Neither of us can imagine a day where we don’t spend time reading a book. The Booker Prizes are ways of spreading the word about the insights, discoveries, pleasures and joy that spring from great fiction". Bukhman Philanthropies, the charitable foundation of Dmitry Bukhman and his wife Daria, began supporting the International Booker Prize in July 2026, and the prize was renamed to the Bukhman International Booker Prize.

== History ==
=== Pre-2016 ===
Whereas the Man Booker Prize was open only to writers from the Commonwealth, Ireland, and Zimbabwe, the International Prize was open to writers of any nationality whose work was available in English, including translations. The award was worth £60,000 and given every two years to a living author for their entire body of literature, in a similar way to the Nobel Prize for Literature. The Man Booker International Prize also allowed for a separate award for translating. If applicable, the winning author could direct the organization to present a prize sum of £15,000 to their translator.

The 2005 inaugural winner of the international prize was Albanian writer Ismail Kadare. Praising its concerted judgement, the journalist Hephzibah Anderson noted that the Man Booker International Prize was "fast becoming the more significant award, appearing an ever more competent alternative to the Nobel".

Year	Author	Country	Translator	Language	Ref.
2005	Ismail Kadare	Albania	N/A	Albanian	
2007	Chinua Achebe	Nigeria	N/A	English	
2009	Alice Munro	Canada	N/A	English	
2011	Philip Roth	United States	N/A	English	
2013	Lydia Davis	United States	N/A	English	
2015	László Krasznahorkai	Hungary	George Szirtes and Ottilie Mulzet	Hungarian	

=== 2016 onwards ===
In July 2015 it was announced that the Independent Foreign Fiction Prize would be disbanded and its prize money would be folded into the Man Booker International Prize. Starting with the 2016 award, the Man Booker International Prize became annual and changed its remit to perform the same role as the Independent prize: awarding books of fiction translated into English, in order to encourage the publishing and reading of quality works in translation and to highlight the work of translators. The £50,000 prize is split between author and translator. Each shortlisted author and translator receives £2,500. Judges select a longlist of 12 or 13 books in March ("the Booker Dozen"), followed by a shortlist of six in April, with the winner announced in May.

In July 2026, it was announced that Bukhman Philanthropies would sponsor the prize for the next 10 years. The prize was renamed the Bukhman International Booker Prize, and the winning prize was increased from £50,000 to £100,000. The shortlist prize remained the same.

Year	Author	Home country	Translator	Translation published in (country)	Work	Language	Ref.
2016	Han Kang	South Korea	Deborah Smith	United Kingdom	The Vegetarian 채식주의자	Korean	
2017	David Grossman	Israel	Jessica Cohen	Israel/UK/US	A Horse Walks into a Bar סוס אחד נכנס לבר	Hebrew	
2018	Olga Tokarczuk	Poland	Jennifer Croft	United States	Flights; Bieguni	Polish	
2019	Jokha al-Harthi	Oman	Marilyn Booth	United States	Celestial Bodies سيدات القمر	Arabic	
2020	Lucas Rijneveld	Netherlands	Michele Hutchison	United Kingdom	The Discomfort of Evening; De avond is ongemak	Dutch	
2021	David Diop	France	Anna Moschovakis	United States	At Night All Blood Is Black; Frère d'âme	French	
2022	Geetanjali Shree	India	Daisy Rockwell	United States	Tomb of Sand रेत समाधि	Hindi	
2023	Georgi Gospodinov	Bulgaria	Angela Rodel	United Kingdom/ United States	Time Shelter; Времеубежище	Bulgarian	
2024	Jenny Erpenbeck	Germany	Michael Hofmann	Germany	Kairos	German	
2025	Banu Mushtaq	India	Deepa Bhasthi	India	Heart Lamp: Selected Stories ಎದೆಯ ಹಣತೆ	Kannada	
2026	Yang Shuang-zi	Taiwan	Lin King	United Kingdom	Taiwan Travelogue 臺灣漫遊錄	Mandarin Chinese	

== Nominations 2005–2015 ==
=== 2005 ===
The inaugural Man Booker International Prize was judged by John Carey (chair), Alberto Manguel and Azar Nafisi. The nominees were announced on 2 June 2005 at Georgetown University in Washington, D.C. Albanian novelist Ismail Kadare was named the inaugural International Prize winner in 2005. Head judge, Professor John Carey said Kadare is "a universal writer in the tradition of storytelling that goes back to Homer." Kadare said he was "deeply honoured" at being awarded the prize. Kadare was also able to select a translator to receive an additional prize of £15,000. The writer received his award in Edinburgh on 27 June.

Winner

- Ismail Kadare

Nominees

- Margaret Atwood (Canada)
- Saul Bellow (US)
- Gabriel García Márquez (Colombia)
- Günter Grass (Germany)
- Ismail Kadare (Albania)
- Milan Kundera (Czech Republic)
- Stanisław Lem (Poland)
- Doris Lessing (UK)
- Ian McEwan (UK)
- Naguib Mahfouz (Egypt)
- Tomás Eloy Martínez (Argentina)
- Kenzaburō Ōe (Japan)
- Cynthia Ozick (US)
- Philip Roth (US)
- Muriel Spark (UK)
- Antonio Tabucchi (Italy)
- John Updike (US)
- A. B. Yehoshua (Israel)

=== 2007 ===
The 2007 prize was judged by Elaine Showalter, Nadine Gordimer and Colm Tóibín. The nominees for the second Man Booker International Prize were announced on 12 April 2007 at Massey College in Toronto. Nigerian author Chinua Achebe was awarded the International Prize for his literary career in 2007. Judge Nadine Gordimer said Achebe was "the father of modern African literature" and that he was "integral" to world literature. Achebe received his award on 28 June in Oxford.

Winner

- Chinua Achebe

Nominees

- Chinua Achebe (Nigeria)
- Margaret Atwood (Canada)
- John Banville (Ireland)
- Peter Carey (Australia)
- Don DeLillo (US)
- Carlos Fuentes (Mexico)
- Doris Lessing (UK)
- Ian McEwan (UK)
- Harry Mulisch (Netherlands)
- Alice Munro (Canada)
- Michael Ondaatje (Sri Lanka/Canada)
- Amos Oz (Israel)
- Philip Roth (US)
- Salman Rushdie (India/UK)
- Michel Tournier (France)

=== 2009 ===
The 2009 prize was judged by Jane Smiley (chair), Amit Chaudhuri and Andrey Kurkov. The nominees for the third Man Booker International Prize were announced on 18 March 2009 at The New York Public Library. Canadian short story writer Alice Munro was named the winner of the prize in 2009 for her lifetime body of work. Judge Jane Smiley said picking a winner had been "a challenge", but Munro had won the panel over. On Munro's work, Smiley said "Her work is practically perfect. Any writer has to gawk when reading her because her work is very subtle and precise. Her thoughtfulness about every subject is so concentrated." Munro, who said she was "totally amazed and delighted" at her win, received the award at Trinity College Dublin on 25 June.

Winner

- Alice Munro

Nominees

- Peter Carey (Australia)
- Evan S. Connell (US)
- Mahasweta Devi (India)
- E. L. Doctorow (US)
- James Kelman (UK)
- Arnošt Lustig (Czech Republic)
- Alice Munro (Canada)
- V. S. Naipaul (Trinidad/UK)
- Ngũgĩ wa Thiong'o (Kenya)
- Joyce Carol Oates (US)
- Antonio Tabucchi (Italy)
- Dubravka Ugrešić (Croatia)
- Lyudmila Ulitskaya (Russia)
- Mario Vargas Llosa (Peru)

=== 2011 ===
The 2011 prize was judged by Rick Gekoski (chair), Carmen Callil (withdrew in protest over choice of winner) and Justin Cartwright. The nominees for the fourth Man Booker International Prize were announced on 30 March 2011 at a ceremony in Sydney, Australia. John le Carré asked to be removed from consideration, saying he was "flattered", but that he does not compete for literary prizes. However, judge Rick Gekoski said although he was disappointed that le Carré wanted to withdraw, his name would remain on the list. American novelist Philip Roth was announced as the winner on 18 May 2011 at the Sydney Writers' Festival. Of his win, Roth said "This is a great honour and I'm delighted to receive it." The writer said he hoped the prize would bring him to the attention of readers around the world who are not currently familiar with his body of work. Roth received his award in London on 28 June; however, he was unable to attend in person due to ill health, so he sent a short video instead. After Roth was announced as the winner, Carmen Callil withdrew from the judging panel, saying "I don't rate him as a writer at all... in 20 years' time will anyone read him?" Callil later wrote an editorial in The Guardian explaining her position and why she chose to leave the panel.

Winner

- Philip Roth

Nominees

- Juan Goytisolo (Spain)
- James Kelman (UK)
- John le Carré (UK)
- Amin Maalouf (Lebanon)
- David Malouf (Australia)
- Dacia Maraini (Italy)
- Rohinton Mistry (India/Canada)
- Philip Pullman (UK)
- Marilynne Robinson (US)
- Philip Roth (US)
- Su Tong (China)
- Wang Anyi (China)
- Anne Tyler (US)

=== 2013 ===
The 2013 prize was judged by Christopher Ricks (chair), Elif Batuman, Aminatta Forna, Yiyun Li and Tim Parks. The nominees for the fifth Man Booker International Prize were announced on 24 January 2013. Marilynne Robinson was the only writer out of the ten nominees who had been nominated for the prize before. Lydia Davis, best known as a short story writer, was announced as the winner of the 2013 prize on 22 May at a ceremony at the Victoria and Albert Museum in London. The official announcement of Davis' award on the Man Booker Prize website described her work as having "the brevity and precision of poetry." Judging panel chair Christopher Ricks commented that "There is vigilance to her stories, and great imaginative attention. Vigilance as how to realise things down to the very word or syllable; vigilance as to everybody's impure motives and illusions of feeling."

Winner

- Lydia Davis

Nominees

- U R Ananthamurthy (India)
- Aharon Appelfeld (Israel)
- Lydia Davis (US)
- Intizar Hussain (Pakistan)
- Marie NDiaye (France)
- Josip Novakovich (Croatia/United States)
- Marilynne Robinson (United States)
- Vladimir Sorokin (Russia)
- Peter Stamm (Switzerland)
- Yan Lianke (China)

=== 2015 ===
The 2015 prize was judged by British author Marina Warner (chair), Nadeem Aslam, Elleke Boehmer, Edwin Frank and Wen-chin Ouyang. The nominees for the sixth Man Booker International Prize were announced on 24 March 2015. László Krasznahorkai became the first author from Hungary to receive the prize, which recognised his "achievement in fiction on the world stage". Warner compared his writing to Kafka and Beckett. Krasznahorkai's translators, George Szirtes and Ottilie Mulzet, shared the £15,000 translators' prize.

Winner

- László Krasznahorkai

Nominees

- César Aira (Argentina)
- Ibrahim al-Koni (Libya)
- Hoda Barakat (Lebanon)
- Maryse Condé (Guadeloupe)
- Mia Couto (Mozambique)
- Amitav Ghosh (India)
- Fanny Howe (United States)
- László Krasznahorkai (Hungary)
- Alain Mabanckou (Republic of the Congo)
- Marlene van Niekerk (South Africa)

== Nominations 2016–present ==
The chair of each year's judging panel is shown in bold text.

=== 2016 ===
The nominees for the seventh Man Booker International Prize were announced on 14 April 2016. The six nominees were chosen from a longlist of thirteen. Han Kang became the first Korean author to win the prize and, under the new format for 2016, Smith became the first translator to share the prize. British journalist Boyd Tonkin, who chaired the judging panel, said that the decision was unanimous. He also said of the book "in a style both lyrical and lacerating, it reveals the impact of this great refusal both on the heroine herself and on those around her. This compact, exquisite and disturbing book will linger long in the minds, and maybe the dreams, of its readers."

Award	Author	Country	Language	Translator	Title	Publisher	Judges
Winner	Han Kang	South Korea	Korean	Deborah Smith	The Vegetarian 채식주의자	Portobello Books	**Boyd Tonkin**; Tahmima Anam; David Bellos; Daniel Medin; Ruth Padel
Shortlist	José Eduardo Agualusa	Angola	Portuguese	Daniel Hahn	A General Theory of Oblivion; Teoria Geral do Esquecimento	Harvill Secker	**Boyd Tonkin**; Tahmima Anam; David Bellos; Daniel Medin; Ruth Padel
Shortlist	Elena Ferrante	Italy	Italian	Ann Goldstein	The Story of the Lost Child; Storia della bambina perduta	Europa Editions	**Boyd Tonkin**; Tahmima Anam; David Bellos; Daniel Medin; Ruth Padel
Shortlist	Orhan Pamuk	Turkey	Turkish	Ekin Oklap	A Strangeness in My Mind; Kafamda Bir Tuhaflık	Faber & Faber	**Boyd Tonkin**; Tahmima Anam; David Bellos; Daniel Medin; Ruth Padel
Shortlist	Robert Seethaler	Austria	German	Charlotte Collins	A Whole Life; Ein ganzes Leben	Picador	**Boyd Tonkin**; Tahmima Anam; David Bellos; Daniel Medin; Ruth Padel
Shortlist	Yan Lianke	China	Mandarin	Carlos Rojas	The Four Books 四書	Chatto & Windus	**Boyd Tonkin**; Tahmima Anam; David Bellos; Daniel Medin; Ruth Padel
Longlist	Maylis de Kerangal	France	French	Jessica Moore	Mend the Living; Réparer les vivants	MacLehose Press	**Boyd Tonkin**; Tahmima Anam; David Bellos; Daniel Medin; Ruth Padel
Longlist	Eka Kurniawan	Indonesia	Indonesian	Labodalih Sembiring	Man Tiger; Lelaki Harimau	Verso Books	**Boyd Tonkin**; Tahmima Anam; David Bellos; Daniel Medin; Ruth Padel
Longlist	Fiston Mwanza Mujila	DR Congo	French	Roland Glasser	Tram 83	Jacaranda Books	**Boyd Tonkin**; Tahmima Anam; David Bellos; Daniel Medin; Ruth Padel
Longlist	Raduan Nassar	Brazil	Portuguese	Stefan Tobler	A Cup of Rage; Um Copo de Cólera	Penguin Modern Classics	**Boyd Tonkin**; Tahmima Anam; David Bellos; Daniel Medin; Ruth Padel
Longlist	Marie NDiaye	France	French	Jordan Stump	Ladivine	MacLehose Press	**Boyd Tonkin**; Tahmima Anam; David Bellos; Daniel Medin; Ruth Padel
Longlist	Kenzaburō Ōe	Japan	Japanese	Deborah Boliver Boehm	Death by Water 水死	Atlantic Books	**Boyd Tonkin**; Tahmima Anam; David Bellos; Daniel Medin; Ruth Padel
Longlist	Aki Ollikainen	Finland	Finnish	Emily Jeremiah & Fleur Jeremiah	White Hunger; Nälkävuosi	Peirene Press	**Boyd Tonkin**; Tahmima Anam; David Bellos; Daniel Medin; Ruth Padel

=== 2017 ===
The longlist for the eighth Man Booker International Prize was announced on 14 March 2017, and the shortlist on 20 April 2017. The winner was announced on 14 June 2017. David Grossman became the first Israeli author to win the prize, sharing the £50,000 award with translator Jessica Cohen. Nick Barley, who is the director of the Edinburgh International Book Festival, described the book as "an ambitious high-wire act of a novel [that] shines a spotlight on the effects of grief, without any hint of sentimentality. The central character is challenging and flawed, but completely compelling." The novel won over 126 other contenders.

Award	Author	Country	Language	Translator	Title	Publisher	Judges
Winner	David Grossman	Israel	Hebrew	Jessica Cohen	A Horse Walks into a Bar סוס אחד נכנס לבר	Jonathan Cape	**Nick Barley**; Daniel Hahn; Helen Mort; Elif Shafak; Chika Unigwe
Shortlist	Mathias Énard	France	French	Charlotte Mandell	Compass; Boussole	Fitzcarraldo Editions	**Nick Barley**; Daniel Hahn; Helen Mort; Elif Shafak; Chika Unigwe
Shortlist	Roy Jacobsen	Norway	Norwegian	Don Bartlett & Don Shaw	The Unseen; De usynlige	MacLehose Press	**Nick Barley**; Daniel Hahn; Helen Mort; Elif Shafak; Chika Unigwe
Shortlist	Dorthe Nors	Denmark	Danish	Misha Hoekstra	Mirror, Shoulder, Signal; Spejl, skulder, blink	Pushkin Press	**Nick Barley**; Daniel Hahn; Helen Mort; Elif Shafak; Chika Unigwe
Shortlist	Amos Oz	Israel	Hebrew	Nicholas de Lange	Judas הבשורה על-פי יהודה	Chatto & Windus	**Nick Barley**; Daniel Hahn; Helen Mort; Elif Shafak; Chika Unigwe
Shortlist	Samanta Schweblin	Argentina	Spanish	Megan McDowell	Fever Dream; Distancia de rescate	Oneworld	**Nick Barley**; Daniel Hahn; Helen Mort; Elif Shafak; Chika Unigwe
Longlist	Wioletta Greg	Poland	Polish	Eliza Marciniak	Swallowing Mercury; Guguły	Portobello Books	**Nick Barley**; Daniel Hahn; Helen Mort; Elif Shafak; Chika Unigwe
Longlist	Stefan Hertmans	Belgium	Dutch	David McKay	War and Turpentine; Oorlog en terpentijn	Harvill Secker	**Nick Barley**; Daniel Hahn; Helen Mort; Elif Shafak; Chika Unigwe
Longlist	Ismail Kadare	Albania	Albanian	John Hodgson	The Traitor's Niche; Kamarja e turpit	Harvill Secker	**Nick Barley**; Daniel Hahn; Helen Mort; Elif Shafak; Chika Unigwe
Longlist	Alain Mabanckou	France	French	Helen Stevenson	Black Moses; Petit Piment	Serpent's Tail	**Nick Barley**; Daniel Hahn; Helen Mort; Elif Shafak; Chika Unigwe
Longlist	Clemens Meyer	Germany	German	Katy Derbyshire	Bricks and Mortar; Im Stein	Fitzcarraldo Editions	**Nick Barley**; Daniel Hahn; Helen Mort; Elif Shafak; Chika Unigwe
Longlist	Jón Kalman Stefánsson	Iceland	Icelandic	Phil Roughton	Fish Have No Feet; Fiskarnir hafa enga fætur	MacLehose Press	**Nick Barley**; Daniel Hahn; Helen Mort; Elif Shafak; Chika Unigwe
Longlist	Yan Lianke	China	Mandarin	Carlos Rojas	The Explosion Chronicles 炸裂志	Chatto & Windus	**Nick Barley**; Daniel Hahn; Helen Mort; Elif Shafak; Chika Unigwe

=== 2018 ===
The longlist for the ninth Man Booker International Prize was announced on 12 March 2018. The shortlist of six books was announced on 12 April 2018 at an event at Somerset House in London. The winner was announced on 22 May 2018 at the Victoria & Albert Museum in London. Olga Tokarczuk is the first Polish author to win the award, and shared the prize with translator Jennifer Croft. Lisa Appignanesi described Tokarczuk as a "writer of wonderful wit, imagination, and literary panache."

Award	Author	Country	Language	Translator	Title	Publisher	Judges
Winner	Olga Tokarczuk	Poland	Polish	Jennifer Croft	Flights; Bieguni	Fitzcarraldo Editions	**Lisa Appignanesi**; Michael Hofmann; Hari Kunzru; Tim Martin; Helen Oyeyemi
Shortlist	Virginie Despentes	France	French	Frank Wynne	Vernon Subutex 1	MacLehose Press	**Lisa Appignanesi**; Michael Hofmann; Hari Kunzru; Tim Martin; Helen Oyeyemi
Shortlist	Han Kang	South Korea	Korean	Deborah Smith	The White Book 흰	Portobello Books	**Lisa Appignanesi**; Michael Hofmann; Hari Kunzru; Tim Martin; Helen Oyeyemi
Shortlist	László Krasznahorkai	Hungary	Hungarian	John Batki, Ottilie Mulzet & George Szirtes	The World Goes On; Megy a világ	Tuskar Rock Press	**Lisa Appignanesi**; Michael Hofmann; Hari Kunzru; Tim Martin; Helen Oyeyemi
Shortlist	Antonio Muñoz Molina	Spain	Spanish	Camilo A. Ramirez	Like a Fading Shadow; Como la sombra que se va	Tuskar Rock Press	**Lisa Appignanesi**; Michael Hofmann; Hari Kunzru; Tim Martin; Helen Oyeyemi
Shortlist	Ahmed Saadawi	Iraq	Arabic	Jonathan Wright	Frankenstein in Baghdad فرانكشتاين في بغداد	Oneworld	**Lisa Appignanesi**; Michael Hofmann; Hari Kunzru; Tim Martin; Helen Oyeyemi
Longlist	Laurent Binet	France	French	Sam Taylor	The 7th Function of Language; La Septième Fonction du langage	Harvill Secker	**Lisa Appignanesi**; Michael Hofmann; Hari Kunzru; Tim Martin; Helen Oyeyemi
Longlist	Javier Cercas	Spain	Spanish	Frank Wynne	The Impostor; El impostor	MacLehose Press	**Lisa Appignanesi**; Michael Hofmann; Hari Kunzru; Tim Martin; Helen Oyeyemi
Longlist	Jenny Erpenbeck	Germany	German	Susan Bernofsky	Go, Went, Gone; Gehen, ging, gegangen	Portobello Books	**Lisa Appignanesi**; Michael Hofmann; Hari Kunzru; Tim Martin; Helen Oyeyemi
Longlist	Ariana Harwicz	Argentina	Spanish	Sarah Moses & Carolina Orloff	Die, My Love; Mátate, amor	Charco Press	**Lisa Appignanesi**; Michael Hofmann; Hari Kunzru; Tim Martin; Helen Oyeyemi
Longlist	Christoph Ransmayr	Austria	German	Simon Pare	The Flying Mountain; Der fliegende Berg	Seagull Books	**Lisa Appignanesi**; Michael Hofmann; Hari Kunzru; Tim Martin; Helen Oyeyemi
Longlist	Wu Ming-Yi	Taiwan	Mandarin	Darryl Sterk	The Stolen Bicycle 單車失竊記	Text Publishing	**Lisa Appignanesi**; Michael Hofmann; Hari Kunzru; Tim Martin; Helen Oyeyemi
Longlist	Gabriela Ybarra	Spain	Spanish	Natasha Wimmer	The Dinner Guest; El comensal	Harvill Secker	**Lisa Appignanesi**; Michael Hofmann; Hari Kunzru; Tim Martin; Helen Oyeyemi

=== 2019 ===
The longlist for the Man Booker International Prize was announced on 13 March 2019. The shortlist was announced on 9 April 2019. The winner was announced on 21 May 2019; Jokha Alharthi is the first author writing in Arabic to have won the Man Booker International Prize. Bettany Hughes said of Celestial Bodies that, "We felt we were getting access to ideas and thoughts and experiences you aren’t normally given in English. It avoids every stereotype you might expect in its analysis of gender and race and social distinction and slavery."

Award	Author	Country	Language	Translator	Title	Publisher	Judges
Winner	Jokha Alharthi	Oman	Arabic	Marilyn Booth	Celestial Bodies سيدات القمر	Sandstone Press	**Bettany Hughes**; Maureen Freely; Angie Hobbs; Pankaj Mishra; Elnathan John
Shortlist	Annie Ernaux	France	French	Alison L. Strayer	The Years; Les années	Fitzcarraldo Editions	**Bettany Hughes**; Maureen Freely; Angie Hobbs; Pankaj Mishra; Elnathan John
Shortlist	Marion Poschmann	Germany	German	Jen Calleja	The Pine Islands; Die Kieferninseln	Serpent's Tail	**Bettany Hughes**; Maureen Freely; Angie Hobbs; Pankaj Mishra; Elnathan John
Shortlist	Olga Tokarczuk	Poland	Polish	Antonia Lloyd-Jones	Drive Your Plow over the Bones of the Dead; Prowadź swój pług przez kości umarłych	Fitzcarraldo Editions	**Bettany Hughes**; Maureen Freely; Angie Hobbs; Pankaj Mishra; Elnathan John
Shortlist	Juan Gabriel Vásquez	Colombia	Spanish	Anne McLean	The Shape of the Ruins; La forma de las ruinas	MacLehose Press	**Bettany Hughes**; Maureen Freely; Angie Hobbs; Pankaj Mishra; Elnathan John
Shortlist	Alia Trabucco Zerán	Chile	Spanish	Sophie Hughes	The Remainder; La resta	And Other Stories	**Bettany Hughes**; Maureen Freely; Angie Hobbs; Pankaj Mishra; Elnathan John
Longlist	Can Xue	China	Mandarin	Annelise Finegan Wasmoen	Love in the New Millennium 新世纪爱情故事	Yale University Press	**Bettany Hughes**; Maureen Freely; Angie Hobbs; Pankaj Mishra; Elnathan John
Longlist	Hwang Sok-yong	South Korea	Korean	Sora Kim-Russell	At Dusk 해질무렵	Scribe	**Bettany Hughes**; Maureen Freely; Angie Hobbs; Pankaj Mishra; Elnathan John
Longlist	Mazen Maarouf	Palestine; Iceland	Arabic	Jonathan Wright	Jokes for the Gunmen نكات للمسلحين	Granta	**Bettany Hughes**; Maureen Freely; Angie Hobbs; Pankaj Mishra; Elnathan John
Longlist	Hubert Mingarelli	France	French	Sam Taylor	Four Soldiers; Quatre soldats	Portobello Books	**Bettany Hughes**; Maureen Freely; Angie Hobbs; Pankaj Mishra; Elnathan John
Longlist	Samanta Schweblin	Argentina	Spanish	Megan McDowell	Mouthful of Birds; Pájaros en la boca	Oneworld	**Bettany Hughes**; Maureen Freely; Angie Hobbs; Pankaj Mishra; Elnathan John
Longlist	Sara Stridsberg	Sweden	Swedish	Deborah Bragan-Turner	The Faculty of Dreams; Drömfakulteten	MacLehose Press	**Bettany Hughes**; Maureen Freely; Angie Hobbs; Pankaj Mishra; Elnathan John
Longlist	Tommy Wieringa	Netherlands	Dutch	Sam Garrett	The Death of Murat Idrissi; De dood van Murat Idrissi	Scribe	**Bettany Hughes**; Maureen Freely; Angie Hobbs; Pankaj Mishra; Elnathan John

=== 2020 ===
The longlist for the prize was announced on 27 February 2020. The shortlist was announced 2 April 2020. The winner announcement was originally planned for 19 May 2020, however due to the COVID-19 pandemic it was postponed to 26 August 2020.

Award	Author	Country	Language	Translator	Title	Publisher	Judges
Winner	Marieke Lucas Rijneveld	Netherlands	Dutch	Michele Hutchison	The Discomfort of Evening; De avond is ongemak	Faber & Faber	**Ted Hodgkinson**; Jennifer Croft; Valeria Luiselli; Jeet Thayil; Lucie Campos
Shortlist	Shokoofeh Azar	Iran	Persian	Anonymous	The Enlightenment of the Greengage Tree اشراق درخت گوجه سبز	Europa Editions	**Ted Hodgkinson**; Jennifer Croft; Valeria Luiselli; Jeet Thayil; Lucie Campos
Shortlist	Gabriela Cabezón Cámara	Argentina	Spanish	Iona Macintyre & Fiona Mackintosh	The Adventures of China Iron; Las aventuras de la China Iron	Charco Press	**Ted Hodgkinson**; Jennifer Croft; Valeria Luiselli; Jeet Thayil; Lucie Campos
Shortlist	Daniel Kehlmann	Germany	German	Ross Benjamin	Tyll	Riverrun, Quercus	**Ted Hodgkinson**; Jennifer Croft; Valeria Luiselli; Jeet Thayil; Lucie Campos
Shortlist	Fernanda Melchor	Mexico	Spanish	Sophie Hughes	Hurricane Season; Temporada de huracanes	Fitzcarraldo Editions	**Ted Hodgkinson**; Jennifer Croft; Valeria Luiselli; Jeet Thayil; Lucie Campos
Shortlist	Yōko Ogawa	Japan	Japanese	Stephen Snyder	The Memory Police 密やかな結晶	Harvill Secker	**Ted Hodgkinson**; Jennifer Croft; Valeria Luiselli; Jeet Thayil; Lucie Campos
Longlist	Willem Anker	South Africa	Afrikaans	Michiel Heyns	Red Dog; Buys: 'n grensroman	Pushkin Press	**Ted Hodgkinson**; Jennifer Croft; Valeria Luiselli; Jeet Thayil; Lucie Campos
Longlist	Jon Fosse	Norway	Norwegian	Damion Searls	The Other Name: Septology I – II; Det andre namnet – Septologien I – II	Fitzcarraldo Editions	**Ted Hodgkinson**; Jennifer Croft; Valeria Luiselli; Jeet Thayil; Lucie Campos
Longlist	Nino Haratischvili	Georgia; Germany	German	Charlotte Collins & Ruth Martin	The Eighth Life; Das achte Leben (Für Brilka)	Scribe	**Ted Hodgkinson**; Jennifer Croft; Valeria Luiselli; Jeet Thayil; Lucie Campos
Longlist	Michel Houellebecq	France	French	Shaun Whiteside	Serotonin; Sérotonine	William Heinemann	**Ted Hodgkinson**; Jennifer Croft; Valeria Luiselli; Jeet Thayil; Lucie Campos
Longlist	Emmanuelle Pagano	France	French	Sophie Lewis & Jennifer Higgins	Faces on the Tip of My Tongue; Un renard à mains nues	Peirene Press	**Ted Hodgkinson**; Jennifer Croft; Valeria Luiselli; Jeet Thayil; Lucie Campos
Longlist	Samanta Schweblin	Argentina	Spanish	Megan McDowell	Little Eyes; Kentukis	Oneworld	**Ted Hodgkinson**; Jennifer Croft; Valeria Luiselli; Jeet Thayil; Lucie Campos
Longlist	Enrique Vila-Matas	Spain	Spanish	Margaret Jull Costa & Sophie Hughes	Mac and His Problem; Mac y su contratiempo	Harvill Secker	**Ted Hodgkinson**; Jennifer Croft; Valeria Luiselli; Jeet Thayil; Lucie Campos

=== 2021 ===
The longlist was announced on 30 March 2021, the shortlist on 22 April, and the winning author and translator on 2 June 2021.

Award	Author	Country	Language	Translator	Title	Publisher	Judges
Winner	David Diop	France	French	Anna Moschovakis	At Night All Blood Is Black; Frère d'âme	Pushkin Press	**Lucy Hughes-Hallett**; Aida Edemariam; Neel Mukherjee; Olivette Otele; George Szirtes
Shortlist	Mariana Enríquez	Argentina	Spanish	Megan McDowell	The Dangers of Smoking in Bed; Los peligros de fumar en la cama	Granta	**Lucy Hughes-Hallett**; Aida Edemariam; Neel Mukherjee; Olivette Otele; George Szirtes
Shortlist	Benjamín Labatut	Chile	Spanish	Adrian Nathan West	When We Cease to Understand the World; Un verdor terrible	Pushkin Press	**Lucy Hughes-Hallett**; Aida Edemariam; Neel Mukherjee; Olivette Otele; George Szirtes
Shortlist	Olga Ravn	Denmark	Danish	Martin Aitken	The Employees; De ansatte	Lolli Editions	**Lucy Hughes-Hallett**; Aida Edemariam; Neel Mukherjee; Olivette Otele; George Szirtes
Shortlist	Maria Stepanova	Russia	Russian	Sasha Dugdale	In Memory of Memory; Памяти памяти	Fitzcarraldo Editions	**Lucy Hughes-Hallett**; Aida Edemariam; Neel Mukherjee; Olivette Otele; George Szirtes
Shortlist	Éric Vuillard	France	French	Mark Polizzotti	The War of the Poor; La Guerre des pauvres	Picador	**Lucy Hughes-Hallett**; Aida Edemariam; Neel Mukherjee; Olivette Otele; George Szirtes
Longlist	Can Xue	China	Mandarin	Karen Gernant & Chen Zeping	I Live in the Slums	Yale University Press	**Lucy Hughes-Hallett**; Aida Edemariam; Neel Mukherjee; Olivette Otele; George Szirtes
Longlist	Nana Ekvtimishvili	Georgia	Georgian	Elizabeth Heighway	The Pear Field მსხლების მინდორი	Peirene Press	**Lucy Hughes-Hallett**; Aida Edemariam; Neel Mukherjee; Olivette Otele; George Szirtes
Longlist	Ngũgĩ wa Thiong'o	Kenya	Kikuyu	Ngũgĩ wa Thiong'o	The Perfect Nine: The Epic of Gĩkũyũ and Mũmbi; Kenda Mũiyũru: Rũgano rwa Gĩkũyũ na Mũmbi	Harvill Secker	**Lucy Hughes-Hallett**; Aida Edemariam; Neel Mukherjee; Olivette Otele; George Szirtes
Longlist	Jaap Robben	Netherlands	Dutch	David Doherty	Summer Brother; Zomervacht	World Editions	**Lucy Hughes-Hallett**; Aida Edemariam; Neel Mukherjee; Olivette Otele; George Szirtes
Longlist	Judith Schalansky	Germany	German	Jackie Smith	An Inventory of Losses; Verzeichnis einiger Verluste	MacLehose Press	**Lucy Hughes-Hallett**; Aida Edemariam; Neel Mukherjee; Olivette Otele; George Szirtes
Longlist	Adania Shibli	Palestine	Arabic	Elisabeth Jaquette	Minor Detail تفصيل ثانوي	Fitzcarraldo Editions	**Lucy Hughes-Hallett**; Aida Edemariam; Neel Mukherjee; Olivette Otele; George Szirtes
Longlist	Andrzej Tichý	Sweden	Swedish	Nichola Smalley	Wretchedness; Eländet	And Other Stories	**Lucy Hughes-Hallett**; Aida Edemariam; Neel Mukherjee; Olivette Otele; George Szirtes

=== 2022 ===
The longlist was announced on 10 March 2022; the shortlist on 7 April 2022 and the winner on 26 May 2022. Tomb of Sand is the first Hindi-language novel to receive a nomination, and the first novel in an Indian language to win the International Booker Prize.

Award	Author	Country	Language	Translator	Title	Publisher	Judges
Winner	Geetanjali Shree	India	Hindi	Daisy Rockwell	Tomb of Sand रेत समाधि	Tilted Axis Press	**Frank Wynne**; Merve Emre; Petina Gappah; Viv Groskop; Jeremy Tiang
Shortlist	Bora Chung	South Korea	Korean	Anton Hur	Cursed Bunny 저주토끼	Honford Star	**Frank Wynne**; Merve Emre; Petina Gappah; Viv Groskop; Jeremy Tiang
Shortlist	Jon Fosse	Norway	Norwegian	Damion Searls	A New Name: Septology VI-VII; Eit nytt namn – Septologien VI – VII	Fitzcarraldo Editions	**Frank Wynne**; Merve Emre; Petina Gappah; Viv Groskop; Jeremy Tiang
Shortlist	Mieko Kawakami	Japan	Japanese	Sam Bett & David Boyd	Heaven ヘヴン	Picador	**Frank Wynne**; Merve Emre; Petina Gappah; Viv Groskop; Jeremy Tiang
Shortlist	Claudia Piñeiro	Argentina	Spanish	Frances Riddle	Elena Knows; Elena sabe	Charco Press	**Frank Wynne**; Merve Emre; Petina Gappah; Viv Groskop; Jeremy Tiang
Shortlist	Olga Tokarczuk	Poland	Polish	Jennifer Croft	The Books of Jacob; Księgi Jakubowe	Fitzcarraldo Editions	**Frank Wynne**; Merve Emre; Petina Gappah; Viv Groskop; Jeremy Tiang
Longlist	Jonas Eika	Denmark	Danish	Sherilyn Hellberg	After the Sun; Efter solen	Lolli Editions	**Frank Wynne**; Merve Emre; Petina Gappah; Viv Groskop; Jeremy Tiang
Longlist	David Grossman	Israel	Hebrew	Jessica Cohen	More Than I Love My Life אתי החיים משחק הרבה	Jonathan Cape	**Frank Wynne**; Merve Emre; Petina Gappah; Viv Groskop; Jeremy Tiang
Longlist	Violaine Huisman	France	French	Leslie Camhi	The Book of Mother; Fugitive parce que reine	Scribner	**Frank Wynne**; Merve Emre; Petina Gappah; Viv Groskop; Jeremy Tiang
Longlist	Fernanda Melchor	Mexico	Spanish	Sophie Hughes	Paradais; Páradais	Fitzcarraldo Editions	**Frank Wynne**; Merve Emre; Petina Gappah; Viv Groskop; Jeremy Tiang
Longlist	Sang Young Park	South Korea	Korean	Anton Hur	Love in the Big City 대도시의 사랑법	Tilted Axis Press	**Frank Wynne**; Merve Emre; Petina Gappah; Viv Groskop; Jeremy Tiang
Longlist	Norman Erikson Pasaribu	Indonesia	Indonesian	Tiffany Tsao	Happy Stories, Mostly; Cerita-cerita Bahagia, Hampir Seluruhnya	Tilted Axis Press	**Frank Wynne**; Merve Emre; Petina Gappah; Viv Groskop; Jeremy Tiang
Longlist	Paulo Scott	Brazil	Portuguese	Daniel Hahn	Phenotypes; Marrom e Amarelo	And Other Stories	**Frank Wynne**; Merve Emre; Petina Gappah; Viv Groskop; Jeremy Tiang

=== 2023 ===
The longlist was announced on 14 March 2023, the shortlist on 18 April 2023, and the winner on 23 May 2023. Gospodinov's Time Shelter is the first Bulgarian-language book to have won the prize.

Award	Author	Country	Language	Translator	Title	Publisher	Judges
Winner	Georgi Gospodinov	Bulgaria	Bulgarian	Angela Rodel	Time Shelter; Времеубежище	Weidenfeld & Nicolson	**Leïla Slimani**; Uilleam Blacker; Tan Twan Eng; Parul Sehgal; Frederick Studemann
Shortlist	Eva Baltasar	Spain	Catalan	Julia Sanches	Boulder	And Other Stories	**Leïla Slimani**; Uilleam Blacker; Tan Twan Eng; Parul Sehgal; Frederick Studemann
Shortlist	Cheon Myeong-kwan	South Korea	Korean	Chi-Young Kim	Whale 고래	Europa Editions	**Leïla Slimani**; Uilleam Blacker; Tan Twan Eng; Parul Sehgal; Frederick Studemann
Shortlist	Maryse Condé	France	French	Richard Philcox	The Gospel According to the New World; L'Évangile du nouveau monde	World Editions	**Leïla Slimani**; Uilleam Blacker; Tan Twan Eng; Parul Sehgal; Frederick Studemann
Shortlist	GauZ'	Ivory Coast	French	Frank Wynne	Standing Heavy; Debout-payé	MacLehose Press	**Leïla Slimani**; Uilleam Blacker; Tan Twan Eng; Parul Sehgal; Frederick Studemann
Shortlist	Guadalupe Nettel	Mexico	Spanish	Rosalind Harvey	Still Born; La hija única	Fitzcarraldo Editions	**Leïla Slimani**; Uilleam Blacker; Tan Twan Eng; Parul Sehgal; Frederick Studemann
Longlist	Vigdis Hjorth	Norway	Norwegian	Charlotte Barslund	Is Mother Dead; Er mor død	Verso Fiction	**Leïla Slimani**; Uilleam Blacker; Tan Twan Eng; Parul Sehgal; Frederick Studemann
Longlist	Andrey Kurkov	Ukraine	Russian	Reuben Woolley	Jimi Hendrix Live in Lviv; Львовская гастроль Джими Хендрикса	MacLehose Press	**Leïla Slimani**; Uilleam Blacker; Tan Twan Eng; Parul Sehgal; Frederick Studemann
Longlist	Laurent Mauvignier	France	French	Daniel Levin Becker	The Birthday Party; Histoires de la nuit	Fitzcarraldo Editions	**Leïla Slimani**; Uilleam Blacker; Tan Twan Eng; Parul Sehgal; Frederick Studemann
Longlist	Clemens Meyer	Germany	German	Katy Derbyshire	While We Were Dreaming; Als wir träumten	Fitzcarraldo Editions	**Leïla Slimani**; Uilleam Blacker; Tan Twan Eng; Parul Sehgal; Frederick Studemann
Longlist	Perumal Murugan	India	Tamil	Aniruddhan Vasudevan	Pyre பூக்குழி	Pushkin Press	**Leïla Slimani**; Uilleam Blacker; Tan Twan Eng; Parul Sehgal; Frederick Studemann
Longlist	Amanda Svensson	Sweden	Swedish	Nichola Smalley	A System So Magnificent It Is Blinding; Ett system så magnifikt att det bländar	Scribe	**Leïla Slimani**; Uilleam Blacker; Tan Twan Eng; Parul Sehgal; Frederick Studemann
Longlist	Zou Jingzhi	China	Mandarin	Jeremy Tiang	Ninth Building 九栋	Honford Star	**Leïla Slimani**; Uilleam Blacker; Tan Twan Eng; Parul Sehgal; Frederick Studemann

=== 2024 ===
The longlist was announced on 11 March 2024, the shortlist on 9 April 2024, and the winner on 21 May 2024, at a ceremony at Tate Modern in London, sponsored by Maison Valentino. The judging panel was chaired by Canadian writer and broadcaster Eleanor Wachtel, and consisted of Mojave American poet Natalie Diaz, Sri Lankan British novelist Romesh Gunesekera, South African artist William Kentridge, and American writer, editor and translator Aaron Robertson. On choosing the six shortlisted books, Eleanor Wachtel said, "Our shortlist, while implicitly optimistic, engages with current realities of racism and oppression, global violence and ecological disaster." The winner was Jenny Erpenbeck for her novel Kairos, translated from the German by Michael Hofmann. The judges' decision marked the first occasion the prize was won by either a German writer or a male translator.

Award	Author	Country	Language	Translator	Title	Publisher	Judges
Winner	Jenny Erpenbeck	Germany	German	Michael Hofmann	Kairos	Granta	**Eleanor Wachtel**; Natalie Diaz; Romesh Gunesekera; William Kentridge; Aaron Robertson
Shortlist	Selva Almada	Argentina	Spanish	Annie McDermott	Not a River; No es un río	Charco Press	**Eleanor Wachtel**; Natalie Diaz; Romesh Gunesekera; William Kentridge; Aaron Robertson
Shortlist	Ia Genberg	Sweden	Swedish	Kira Josefsson	The Details; Detaljerna	Granta	**Eleanor Wachtel**; Natalie Diaz; Romesh Gunesekera; William Kentridge; Aaron Robertson
Shortlist	Hwang Sok-yong	South Korea	Korean	Sora Kim-Russell & Youngjae Josephine Bae	Mater 2-10 철도원 삼대	Scribe	**Eleanor Wachtel**; Natalie Diaz; Romesh Gunesekera; William Kentridge; Aaron Robertson
Shortlist	Jente Posthuma	Netherlands	Dutch	Sarah Timmer Harvey	What I’d Rather Not Think About; Waar ik liever niet aan denk	Scribe	**Eleanor Wachtel**; Natalie Diaz; Romesh Gunesekera; William Kentridge; Aaron Robertson
Shortlist	Itamar Vieira Junior	Brazil	Portuguese	Johnny Lorenz	Crooked Plow; Torto Arado	Verso Books	**Eleanor Wachtel**; Natalie Diaz; Romesh Gunesekera; William Kentridge; Aaron Robertson
Longlist	Rodrigo Blanco Calderón	Venezuela	Spanish	Noel Hernández González & Daniel Hahn	Simpatía	Seven Stories Press	**Eleanor Wachtel**; Natalie Diaz; Romesh Gunesekera; William Kentridge; Aaron Robertson
Longlist	Urszula Honek	Poland	Polish	Kate Webster	White Nights; Białe noce	MTO Press	**Eleanor Wachtel**; Natalie Diaz; Romesh Gunesekera; William Kentridge; Aaron Robertson
Longlist	Ismail Kadare	Albania	Albanian	John Hodgson	A Dictator Calls; Kur sunduesit grinden	Harvill Secker	**Eleanor Wachtel**; Natalie Diaz; Romesh Gunesekera; William Kentridge; Aaron Robertson
Longlist	Andrey Kurkov	Ukraine	Russian	Boris Dralyuk	The Silver Bone; Самсон и Надежда	MacLehose Press	**Eleanor Wachtel**; Natalie Diaz; Romesh Gunesekera; William Kentridge; Aaron Robertson
Longlist	Veronica Raimo	Italy	Italian	Leah Janeczko	Lost on Me; Niente di vero	Virago Press	**Eleanor Wachtel**; Natalie Diaz; Romesh Gunesekera; William Kentridge; Aaron Robertson
Longlist	Domenico Starnone	Italy	Italian	Oonagh Stransky	The House on Via Gemito; Via Gemito	Europa Editions	**Eleanor Wachtel**; Natalie Diaz; Romesh Gunesekera; William Kentridge; Aaron Robertson
Longlist	Gabriela Wiener	Peru	Spanish	Julia Sanches	Undiscovered; Huaco retrato	Pushkin Press	**Eleanor Wachtel**; Natalie Diaz; Romesh Gunesekera; William Kentridge; Aaron Robertson

=== 2025 ===
The longlist was announced on 25 February 2025 and the shortlist was published on 8 April 2025. The judging panel was chaired by English writer Max Porter and also consisted of Nigerian poet, director and photographer Caleb Femi, writer and publishing director of Wasafiri Sana Goyal, South Korean writer and translator Anton Hur, and English singer-songwriter Beth Orton. The winner, Banu Mushtaq's Heart Lamp: Selected Stories, was announced on 20 May 2025.

All 13 writers on the longlist were first-time nominees. The works selected for 2025 included several other firsts: the prize's first nominated translation from Kannada (Heart Lamp); the first nomination of a Romanian author (Cărtărescu); and the first nomination for an Iraqi translator (Antoon). Translator Sophie Hughes appeared on the longlist for a record fifth time and on the shortlist for a record third time. Deepa Bhasthi was the first Indian translator to win the award.

Award	Author	Country	Language	Translator	Title	Publisher	Judges
Winner	Banu Mushtaq	India	Kannada	Deepa Bhasthi	Heart Lamp: Selected Stories ಎದೆಯ ಹಣತೆ	And Other Stories	**Max Porter**; Caleb Femi; Sana Goyal; Anton Hur; Beth Orton
Shortlist	Anne Serre	France	French	Mark Hutchinson	A Leopard-Skin Hat; Un chapeau léopard	Lolli Editions	**Max Porter**; Caleb Femi; Sana Goyal; Anton Hur; Beth Orton
Shortlist	Vincenzo Latronico	Italy	Italian	Sophie Hughes	Perfection; Le perfezioni	Fitzcarraldo Editions	**Max Porter**; Caleb Femi; Sana Goyal; Anton Hur; Beth Orton
Shortlist	Hiromi Kawakami	Japan	Japanese	Asa Yoneda	Under the Eye of the Big Bird 大きな鳥にさらわれないよう	Granta	**Max Porter**; Caleb Femi; Sana Goyal; Anton Hur; Beth Orton
Shortlist	Vincent Delecroix	France	French	Helen Stevenson	Small Boat; Naufrage	Small Axes	**Max Porter**; Caleb Femi; Sana Goyal; Anton Hur; Beth Orton
Shortlist	Solvej Balle	Denmark	Danish	Barbara J Haveland	On the Calculation of Volume I Om udregning af rumfang	Faber & Faber	**Max Porter**; Caleb Femi; Sana Goyal; Anton Hur; Beth Orton
Longlist	Ibtisam Azem	Palestine	Arabic	Sinan Antoon	The Book of Disappearance سفر الإختفاء	And Other Stories	**Max Porter**; Caleb Femi; Sana Goyal; Anton Hur; Beth Orton
Longlist	Gaëlle Bélem	France	French	Karen Fleetwood & Laëtitia Saint-Loubert	There's a Monster behind the Door; Un monstre est là, derrière la porte	Bullaun Press	**Max Porter**; Caleb Femi; Sana Goyal; Anton Hur; Beth Orton
Longlist	Mircea Cărtărescu	Romania	Romanian	Sean Cotter	Solenoid	Pushkin Press	**Max Porter**; Caleb Femi; Sana Goyal; Anton Hur; Beth Orton
Longlist	Dahlia de la Cerda	Mexico	Spanish	Heather Cleary & Julia Sanches	Reservoir Bitches; Perras de reserva	Scribe	**Max Porter**; Caleb Femi; Sana Goyal; Anton Hur; Beth Orton
Longlist	Saou Ichikawa	Japan	Japanese	Polly Barton	Hunchback ハンチバック	Viking Press	**Max Porter**; Caleb Femi; Sana Goyal; Anton Hur; Beth Orton
Longlist	Christian Kracht	Switzerland	German	Daniel Bowles	Eurotrash	Serpent's Tail	**Max Porter**; Caleb Femi; Sana Goyal; Anton Hur; Beth Orton
Longlist	Astrid Roemer	Suriname; Netherlands	Dutch	Lucy Scott	On a Woman's Madness; Over de gekte van een vrouw	Tilted Axis Press	**Max Porter**; Caleb Femi; Sana Goyal; Anton Hur; Beth Orton

=== 2026 ===
The longlist was announced on 24 February 2026 and the shortlist on 31 March 2026. The winner, Yáng Shuāng-zǐ's Taiwan Travelogue, was announced on 19 May 2026 at the Tate Modern in London. Taiwan Travelogue is the first book written in Mandarin and the first book by a Taiwanese author to win. The judging panel was chaired by British writer Natasha Brown alongside Oxford professor and mathematician Marcus du Sautoy, International Booker Prize-shortlisted translator Sophie Hughes, Kenyan writer and editor Troy Onyango, and Indian novelist and columnist Nilanjana Roy.

In 2026, The Vegetarian was voted the readers' favourite of all the Booker winners in the last ten years.

Award	Author	Country	Language	Translator	Title	Publisher	Judges
Winner	Yáng Shuāng-zǐ	Taiwan	Mandarin	Lin King	Taiwan Travelogue 臺灣漫遊錄	And Other Stories	**Natasha Brown**; Marcus du Sautoy; Sophie Hughes; Troy Onyango; Nilanjana S. Roy
Shortlist	Marie NDiaye	France	French	Jordan Stump	The Witch; La Sorcière	MacLehose Press	**Natasha Brown**; Marcus du Sautoy; Sophie Hughes; Troy Onyango; Nilanjana S. Roy
Shortlist	Ana Paula Maia	Brazil	Portuguese	Padma Viswanathan	On Earth As It Is Beneath; Assim na Terra como embaixo da Terra	Charco Press	**Natasha Brown**; Marcus du Sautoy; Sophie Hughes; Troy Onyango; Nilanjana S. Roy
Shortlist	Daniel Kehlmann	Germany; Austria	German	Ross Benjamin	The Director; Lichtspiel	riverrun	**Natasha Brown**; Marcus du Sautoy; Sophie Hughes; Troy Onyango; Nilanjana S. Roy
Shortlist	Rene Karabash	Bulgaria	Bulgarian	Izidora Angel	She Who Remains; Остайница	Peirene Press	**Natasha Brown**; Marcus du Sautoy; Sophie Hughes; Troy Onyango; Nilanjana S. Roy
Shortlist	Shida Bazyar	Germany	German	Ruth Martin	The Nights Are Quiet in Tehran; Nachts ist es leise in Teheran	Scribe UK	**Natasha Brown**; Marcus du Sautoy; Sophie Hughes; Troy Onyango; Nilanjana S. Roy
Longlist							**Natasha Brown**; Marcus du Sautoy; Sophie Hughes; Troy Onyango; Nilanjana S. Roy
Longlist	Olga Ravn	Denmark	Danish	Martin Aitken	The Wax Child; Voksbarnet	Viking	**Natasha Brown**; Marcus du Sautoy; Sophie Hughes; Troy Onyango; Nilanjana S. Roy
Longlist	Shahrnush Parsipur	Iran	Farsi	Faridoun Farrokh	Women without Men زنان بدون مردان	Penguin International Writers	**Natasha Brown**; Marcus du Sautoy; Sophie Hughes; Troy Onyango; Nilanjana S. Roy
Longlist	Matteo Melchiorre	Italy	Italian	Antonella Lettieri	The Duke; Il Duca	Foundry Editions	**Natasha Brown**; Marcus du Sautoy; Sophie Hughes; Troy Onyango; Nilanjana S. Roy
Longlist	Ia Genberg	Sweden	Swedish	Kira Josefsson	Small Comfort; Klen tröst	Wildfire Books	**Natasha Brown**; Marcus du Sautoy; Sophie Hughes; Troy Onyango; Nilanjana S. Roy
Longlist	Mathias Énard	France	French	Charlotte Mandell	The Deserters; Déserter	Fitzcarraldo Editions	**Natasha Brown**; Marcus du Sautoy; Sophie Hughes; Troy Onyango; Nilanjana S. Roy
Longlist	Anjet Daanje	Netherlands	Dutch	David McKay	The Remembered Soldier; De herinnerde soldaat	Scribe UK	**Natasha Brown**; Marcus du Sautoy; Sophie Hughes; Troy Onyango; Nilanjana S. Roy
Longlist	Gabriela Cabezón Cámara	Argentina	Spanish	Robin Myers	We Are Green and Trembling; Las niñas del naranjel	Harvill	**Natasha Brown**; Marcus du Sautoy; Sophie Hughes; Troy Onyango; Nilanjana S. Roy

=== 2027 ===
In July 2026, it was announced that American writer Katie Kitamura would chair the judging panel for 2027; she will be joined by writer Patrick McGuinness, British-Ghanaian writer Caleb Azumah Nelson, Danish writer Olga Ravn and American actress Tessa Thompson. The longlist will be announced on 16 March 2027, and the shortlist will be announced on 15 April 2027. The winning book will be announced in May 2027.

== See also ==
- Booker Prize
- Franz Kafka Prize
- International Dublin Literary Award
- List of literary awards
- Man Asian Literary Prize
- National Book Award
- Neustadt International Prize for Literature
- Prix Goncourt
- Warwick Prize for Women in Translation
- Independent Foreign Fiction Prize
