= Michael Hofmann =

German-born poet (born 1957)

Michael Hofmann FRSL
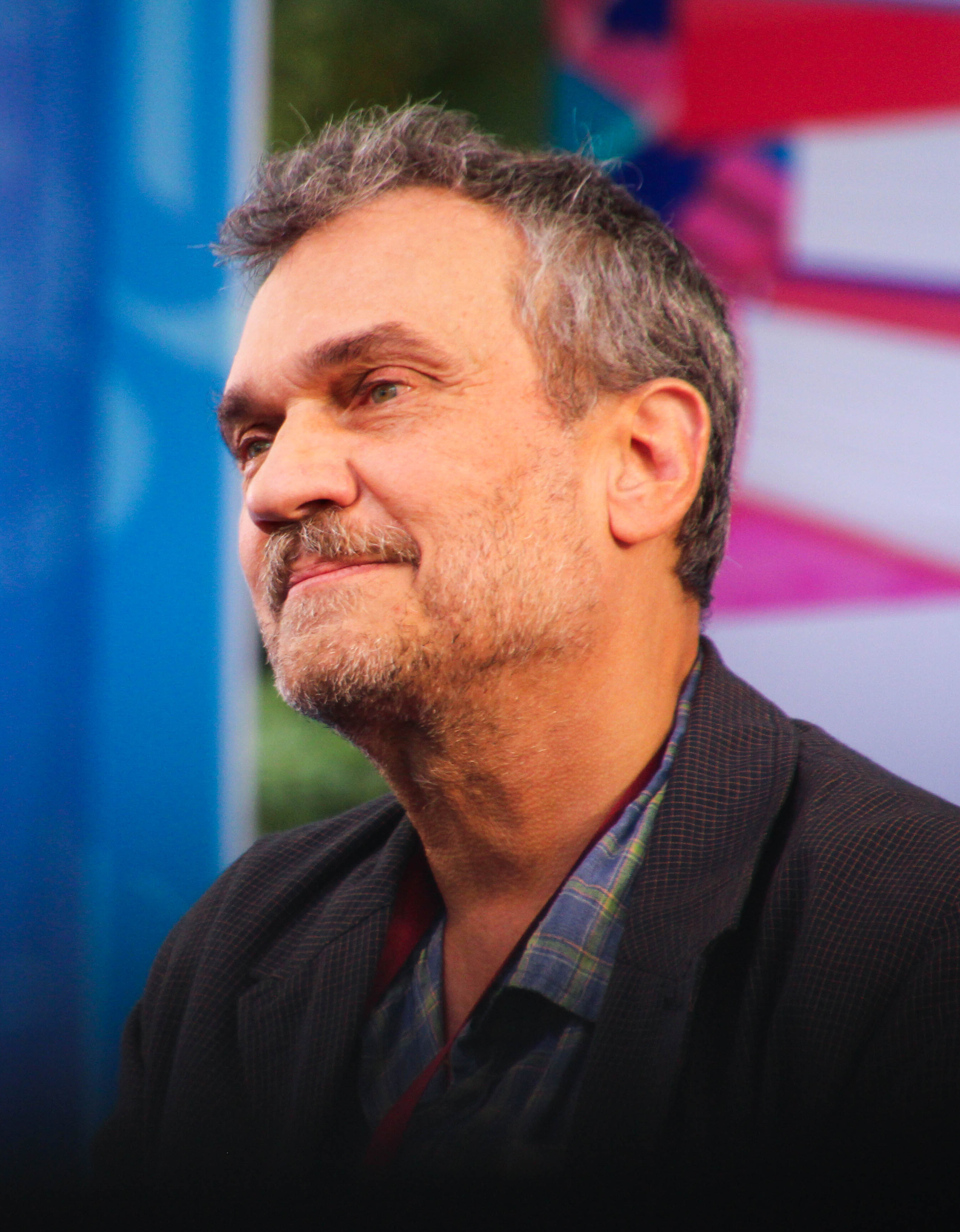
- Hofmann in 2025
- Born: 25 August 1957 (age 69); Freiburg im Breisgau, Germany
- Education: University of Cambridge
- Occupations: Poet, translator
- Relatives: Gert Hofmann (father), Eva (Thomas) Hofmann (mother)
- Writing career
- Genres: Criticism, poetry, translation

Michael Hofmann FRSL (born 25 August 1957) is a German-born poet, translator, and critic. The Guardian has described him as "arguably the world's most influential translator of German into English".

== Biography ==
Michael Hofmann was born in Freiburg im Breisgau (West Germany), the son of German novelist Gert Hofmann and his wife Eva (Thomas) Hofmann, a teacher. He grew up in a family with a literary tradition. His maternal grandfather edited the Brockhaus Enzyklopädie. Hofmann's family first moved to Bristol in 1961, and later to Edinburgh. He was educated at Winchester College, and then studied English Literature and Classics at Magdalene College, Cambridge, graduating with a BA in 1979. For the next four years, he pursued postgraduate study at the University of Regensburg and Trinity College, Cambridge.

In 1983, Hofmann started working as a freelance writer, translator, and literary critic. He has since gone on to hold visiting professorships at the University of Michigan, Rutgers University, the New School University, Barnard College, and Columbia University. He was first a visitor to the University of Florida in 1990, joined the faculty in 1994, and became full-time in 2009. He has been teaching poetry and translation workshops.

In 2008, Hofmann was Poet-in-Residence in the state of Queensland in Australia.

Hofmann has two sons, Max (1991) and Jakob (1993). He splits his time between Hamburg and Gainesville, Florida.

== Honours ==
Hofmann received the Cholmondeley Award in 1984 for Nights in the Iron Hotel and the Geoffrey Faber Memorial Prize in 1988 for Acrimony. The same year, he also received the Schlegel-Tieck Prize for his translation of Patrick Süskind's Der Kontrabaß (The Double Bass). In 1993 he received the Schlegel-Tieck Prize again for his translation of Wolfgang Koeppen's Death in Rome.

Hofmann was awarded the Independent Foreign Fiction Prize in 1995 for the translation of his father's novel The Film Explainer, and nominated again in 2003 for his translation of Peter Stephan Jungk's The Snowflake Constant. In 1997 he received the Arts Council Writer's Award for his collection of poems Approximately Nowhere, and the following year he received the International Dublin Literary Award for his translation of Herta Müller's novel The Land of Green Plums.

In 1999, Hofmann was awarded the PEN/Book-of-the-Month Club Translation Prize for his translation of Joseph Roth's The String of Pearls. In 2000, Hofmann was selected as the recipient of the Helen and Kurt Wolff Translator's Prize for his translation of Joseph Roth's novel Rebellion (Die Rebellion). In 2003 he received another Schlegel-Tieck Prize for his translation of his father's Luck, and in 2004 he was awarded the Oxford-Weidenfeld Translation Prize for his translation of Ernst Jünger's Storm of Steel. In 2005 Hofmann runner-up for the Schlegel-Tieck Prize for his translation of Gert Ledig's The Stalin Organ. Hofmann served as a judge for the Griffin Poetry Prize in 2002, and in 2006 Hofmann made the Griffin's international shortlist for his translation of Durs Grünbein's Ashes for Breakfast.

Hofmann was elected a Fellow of the Royal Society of Literature in 2023.

His translation of Jenny Erpenbeck's novel Kairos won them the International Booker Prize in 2024, the first occasion on which the prize was won by either a German writer or a male translator.

== Critical writing ==
Maria Tumarkin describes Hofmann's review writing as "masterful" and "convention-eviscerating". Philip Oltermann remarks on the "savagery" with which Hofmann "can wield a hatchet", stating (with reference to Hofmann's antipathy towards Stefan Zweig) that: "Like a Soho drunk stumbling into the National Portrait Gallery in search of a good scrap, Hofmann has battered posthumous reputations with the same glee as those of the living."

== Selected bibliography ==
=== Author ===
- Nights in the Iron Hotel. London: Faber and Faber. 1984. ISBN 978-0-571-13116-7.
- Acrimony. London: Faber and Faber. 1986. ISBN 978-0-571-14528-7.
- Corona, Corona. London: Faber and Faber. 1993. ISBN 978-0-571-17052-4.
- Approximately Nowhere: poems. London: Faber and Faber. 1999. ISBN 978-0-571-19524-4.
- Behind the Lines: Pieces on Writing and Pictures. London: Faber and Faber. 2002. ISBN 978-0-571-19523-7.
- Where Have You Been?: Selected Essays. New York: Farrar, Straus and Giroux. 2014. ISBN 978-0-374-25996-9.
- One Lark, One Horse. London: Faber and Faber. 2018. ISBN 978-0-571-342297.
- Messing About in Boats. Oxford: Oxford University Press. 2021.

=== Translator ===
- Tucholsky, Kurt (1985). Castle Gripsholm: A Summer Story. Translated by Michael Hofmann. London: Chatto and Windus. ISBN 978-0-7011-2993-4.
- Wenders, Wim (1989). Emotion Pictures: Reflections on the Cinema. Translated by Michael Hofmann. London: Faber and Faber. ISBN 978-0-571-15272-8.
- Wenders, Wim (1992). The Logic of Images: Essays and Conversations. Translated by Michael Hofmann. London: Faber and Faber. ISBN 978-0-571-16517-9.
- Koeppen, Wolfgang (1992). Death in Rome. Translated by Michael Hofmann. London: Granta. ISBN 978-1-86207-589-4.
- Roth, Joseph (1995). The String of Pearls. Translated by Michael Hofmann. London: Granta. ISBN 978-1-86207-087-5.
- Hofmann, Gert (1995). The Film Explainer. Translated by Michael Hofmann. Evanston: Northwestern University Press. ISBN 978-0-8101-1293-3.
- Süskind, Patrick (1997). The Double Bass. Translated by Michael Hofmann. London: Bloomsbury. ISBN 978-0-7011-2993-4.
- Süskind, Patrick (13 October 2023). The Story of Mr Sommer. Translated by Michael Hofmann. London: Fox, Finch & Tepper. ISBN 978-0-99-304672-8.
- Kafka, Franz (1996). The Man Who Disappeared (Amerika). Translated by Michael Hofmann. London: Penguin. ISBN 978-0-140-18621-5.
- Müller, Herta (1998). The Land of Green Plums. Translated by Michael Hofmann. London: Granta. ISBN 978-1-86207-260-2.
- Roth, Joseph (1999). Rebellion. Translated by Michael Hofmann. London: Picador. ISBN 978-0-312-26383-6.
- Koeppen, Wolfgang (2002). The Hothouse. Translated by Michael Hofmann. London: Granta. ISBN 978-1862075092.
- Stamm, Peter (2002). Agnes. Translated by Michael Hofmann. London: Bloomsbury. ISBN 978-0-747-54752-5.
- Jungk, Peter Stephan (2002). The Snowflake Constant. Translated by Michael Hofmann. London: Faber and Faber. ISBN 978-0-571-20182-2.
- Koeppen, Wolfgang (2003. A Sad Affair. Norton.
- Roth, Joseph (2003). Radetzky March. Translated by Michael Hofmann. London: Granta. ISBN 978-1-86207-605-1.
- Jungk, Peter Stephan (2004). The Perfect American. Translated by Michael Hofmann. New York, NY: Handsel Books. ISBN 978-1-59051-115-2.
- Jünger, Ernst (2004). Storm of Steel. Translated by Michael Hofmann. London: Penguin Classics. ISBN 978-0-14-243790-2.
- Hofmann, Gert (2004). Lichtenberg and the Little Flower Girl. Translated by Michael Hofmann. New York, NY: New Directions Publishers. ISBN 978-0-8112-1568-8.
- Ledig, Gert (2004). The Stalin Organ. Translated by Michael Hofmann. London: Granta. ISBN 978-1-862-07652-5.
- Grünbein, Durs (2006). Ashes for Breakfast: Selected Poems. Translated by Michael Hofmann. New York, NY: Farrar, Straus and Giroux. ISBN 978-0-374-53013-6.
- Bernhard, Thomas (2006). Frost. Translated by Michael Hofmann. New York, NY: Knopf. ISBN 978-1-400-04066-7.
- Stamm, Peter (2006). Unformed Landscape. Translated by Michael Hofmann. New York, NY: Handsel Books. ISBN 978-1-590-51226-5.
- Kafka, Franz (2006). The Zürau Aphorisms. Translated by Michael Hofmann. New York, NY: Schocken. ISBN 978-0-8052-1207-5.
- Stamm, Peter (2008). In Strange Gardens and other stories. Translated by Michael Hofmann. New York, NY: Other Press. ISBN 978-1-590-51169-5.
- Kafka, Franz (2007). Metamorphosis and other stories. Translated by Michael Hofmann. New York, NY: Penguin Classics. ISBN 978-0-14-310524-4.
- Wander, Fred (2007). The Seventh Well. Translated by Michael Hofmann. New York, NY: W. W. Norton & Company. ISBN 978-0-393-06538-1.
- Keun, Irmgard (2008). Child of All Nations. Translated by Michael Hofmann. London: Penguin Classics. ISBN 978-0-713-99907-5.
- Stamm, Peter (2008). On a Day Like This. Translated by Michael Hofmann. New York, NY: Other Press. ISBN 978-1-590-51279-1.
- Fallada, Hans (2009). Every Man Dies Alone. Translated by Michael Hofmann. New York, NY: Melville House. ISBN 978-1-933633-63-3.
- Canetti, Elias (2010). Party in the Blitz. Translated by Michael Hofmann. New York, NY: New Directions.
- Roth, Joseph (2011). The Leviathan. Translated by Michael Hofmann. New York, NY: New Directions.
- Roth, Joseph (2012). Joseph Roth: A Life in Letters. Translated by Michael Hofmann. New York, NY: W. W. Norton & Company. ISBN 978-0-393-32379-5.
- Benn, Gottfried (2013). Impromptus: Selected Poems and Some Prose. Translated by Michael Hofmann. New York, NY: Farrar, Straus and Giroux. ISBN 978-0-374-17537-5.
- Roth, Joseph (2013). The Emperor's Tomb. Translated by Michael Hofmann. New York, NY: New Directions.
- Roth, Joseph (2015). The Hotel Years. Translated by Michael Hofmann. New York, NY: New Directions.
- Kafka, Franz (2017). Investigations of a Dog & Other Creatures. Translated by Michael Hofmann. New York, NY: New Directions.
- Döblin, Alfred (2018). Berlin Alexanderplatz. Translated by Michael Hofmann. New York, NY: New York Review Books.
- Kleist, Heinrich von (2020). Michael Kohlhaas. Translated by Michael Hofmann. New York, NY: New Directions.
- Koeppen, Wolfgang (2020). Pigeons on the Grass. Translated by Michael Hofmann. New York, NY: New Directions.
- Kafka, Franz (2020). The Lost Writings. Translated by Michael Hofmann. New York, NY: New Directions.
- Herzog, Werner (2023). Every Man for Himself and God Against All: A Memoir. Translated by Michael Hofmann. New York, NY: Penguin.
- Erpenbeck, Jenny (2023). Kairos. Translated by Michael Hofmann. London: Granta. ISBN 978-1-783-78612-1.
- Herzog, Werner (2025). The Future of Truth. New York, NY: Penguin. ISBN 9781847928405.

=== Editor ===
- Hofmann, Michael; Lasdun, James, eds. (1994), After Ovid: new metamorphoses, New York, NY: Farrar, Straus and Giroux, ISBN 978-0-374-52478-4
- Hofmann, Michael, ed. (2001), Robert Lowell, London: Faber and Faber, ISBN 978-0-571-23040-2
- Hofmann, Michael, ed. (2005), The Faber Book of 20th Century German Poems, London: Faber and Faber, ISBN 978-0-571-19703-3
- Hofmann, Michael, ed. (2006), Twentieth-Century German Poetry: an anthology, New York, NY: Farrar, Straus and Giroux, ISBN 978-0-374-10535-8
