= The Brutal Years =

1957 novel by Gert Ledig

- Author: Gert Ledig
- Original title: Faustrecht
- Translator: Oliver Coburn; Ursula Lehrburger
- Language: German
- Publisher: Desch
- Publication date: 1957
- Publication place: West Germany
- English publication date: 1959
- Pages: 230

The Brutal Years (German: Faustrecht, lit. 'Fist Right') is a 1957 novel by the German writer Gert Ledig. It is set in Munich in November 1945, right after World War II, and follows three German ex-soldiers who make a failed robbery attempt against an American military Jeep and hide in an apartment with two prostitutes. The style is laconic and relies heavily on dialogue. The book is an example of Trümmerliteratur. It was published in English translation in 1959.

It forms a loose, unintended trilogy with Ledig's previous novels The Stalin Organ (1955) and Payback (1956), portraying the German experience of World War II and its immediate aftermath. The Stalin Organ was a critical and commercial success, but Payback was poorly received before being reevaluated at the turn of the millennium, and The Brutal Years was considered such a failure that Ledig ended his writing career.
