= Ryn =

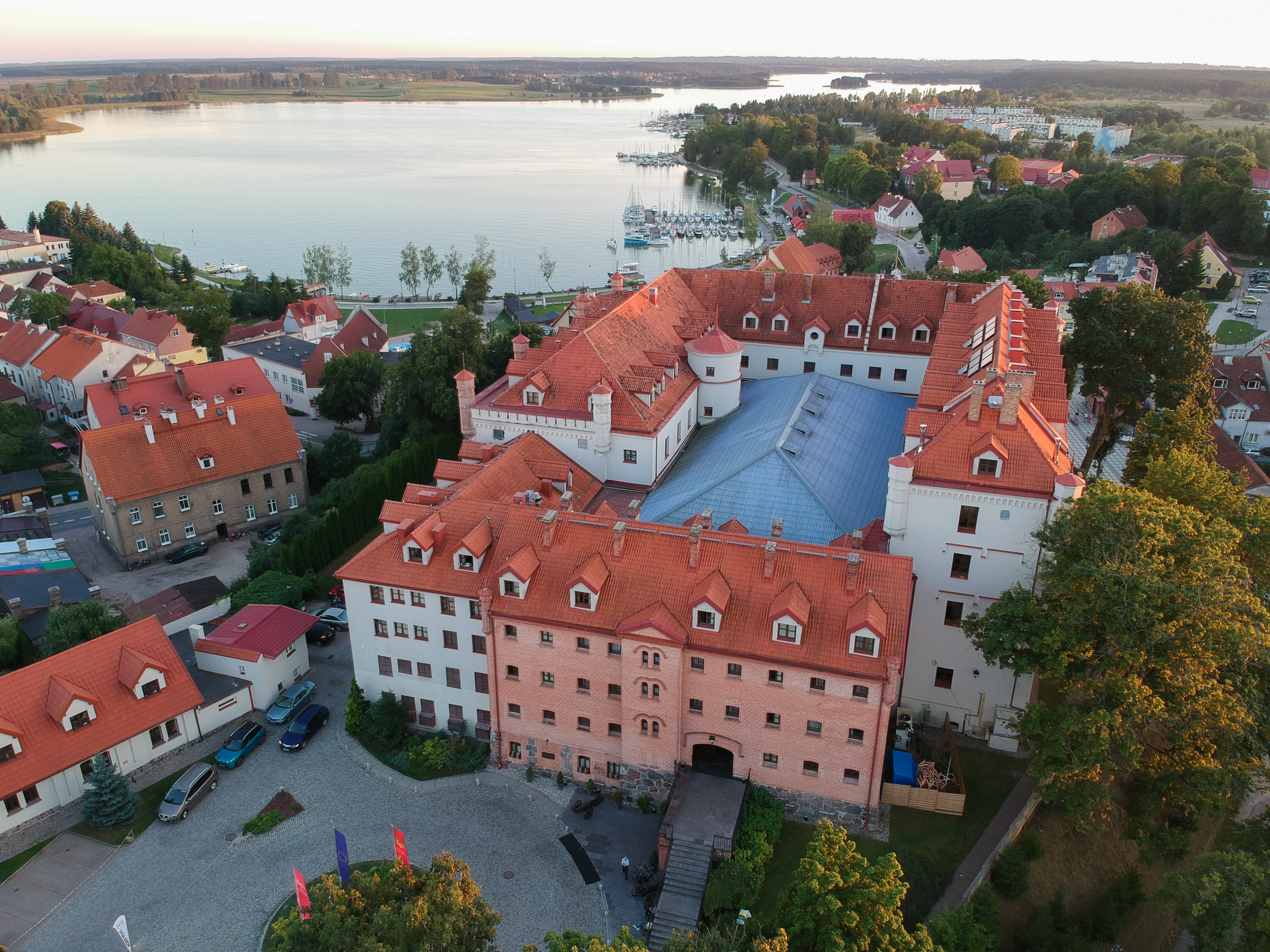
- Ryn Castle and Lake Ryn

- Coat of arms

- Location within Poland
- Coordinates: 53°56′16″N 21°32′53″E
- Country: Poland
- Voivodeship: Warmian-Masurian
- County: Giżycko
- Gmina: Ryn

Area
  - Total: 4.09 km^{2} (1.58 sq mi)

Population (2006)
  - Total: 3,006
  - Density: 735/km^{2} (1,900/sq mi)
- Time zone: UTC+1 (CET)
  - Summer (DST): UTC+2 (CEST)
- Postal code: 11-520
- Vehicle registration: NGI
- Website: http://www.miastoryn.pl/

Ryn [rɨn] (German: Rhein) is a town in northeastern Poland located 19 km (12 mi) southwest of Giżycko, in the Warmian-Masurian Voivodeship, in Masuria. It had a population of 3,062 inhabitants as of December 31, 2004.

Ryn is located between Lake Ryn and Lake Ołów. Among the notable landmarks of the town are a former Ordensburg castle of the Teutonic Knights (erected ca. 1337) and a 19th-century Dutch windmill. Below the castle in the center of the town, a subterranean channel connects the Matussek pond, a shoaled bay of Lake Ołów, with Lake Ryn and the pond of a mill built by the Teutonic Knights.

== History ==
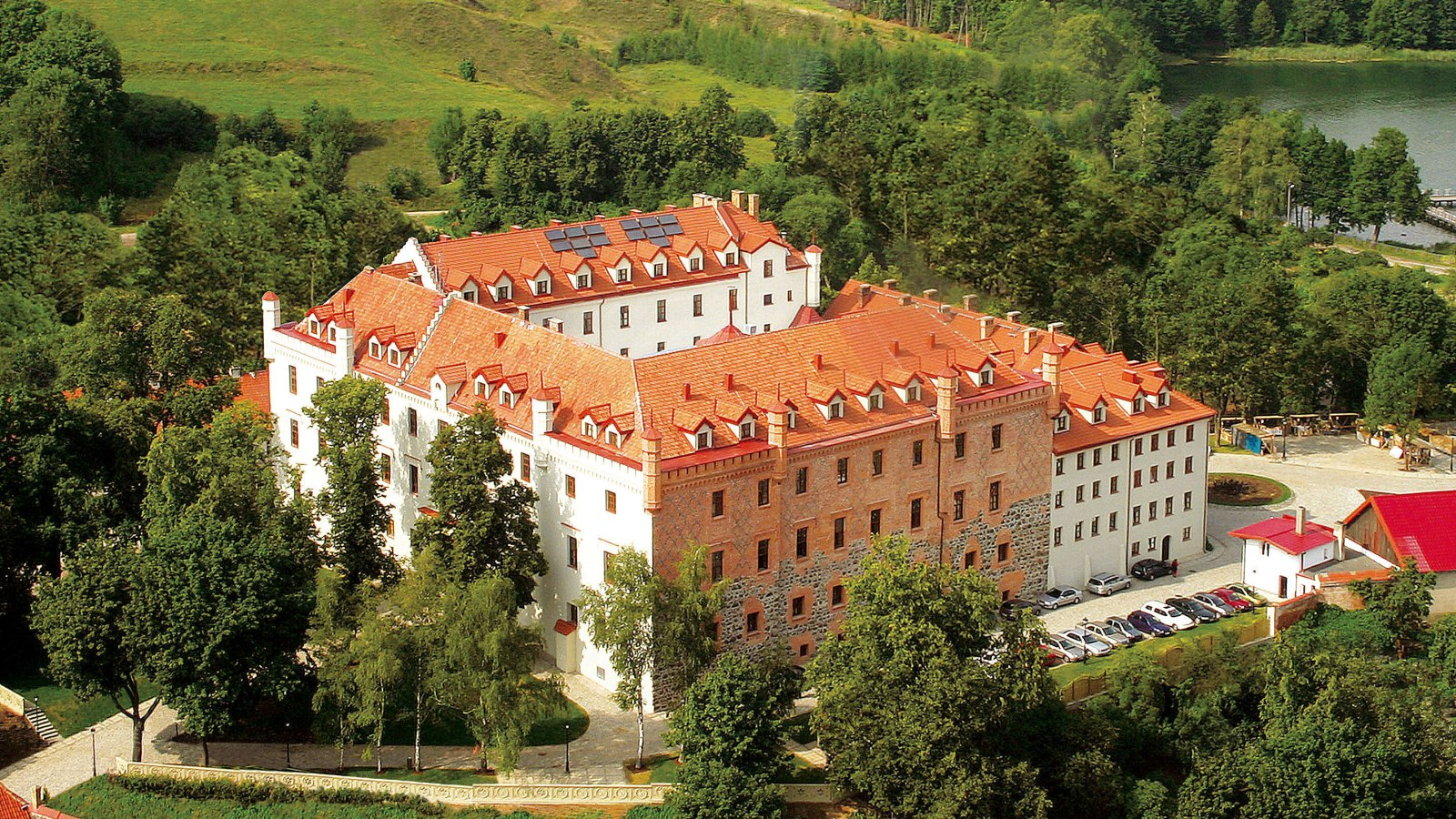
The castle in Ryn

Grand Master Winrich von Kniprode of the Teutonic Knights built a fortress on the site of a former Old Prussian fortification in 1337. A settlement near the castle was first mentioned in documents in 1405. It was known as Ryne after the Rhine River, and was included within the komturship of Balga. Ryne later became known in Standard German as Rhein and in Polish as Ryn. Since the 15th century the population was mostly Polish.

After the outbreak of the Thirteen Years’ War the castle was captured by the Prussian Confederation, at the request of which in 1454 King Casimir IV Jagiellon signed the act of incorporation of the region to the Kingdom of Poland. Later on, it was captured by the Teutonic Knights and was repeatedly besieged by the Confederation troops. After the Second Peace of Thorn in 1466 it remained under the authority of the Teutonic Knights as a fief of the Polish Crown.

The Komtur Haus zur Ryne was established in 1393, after which Rhein was the seat of a Komtur first until 1422; the Komturship was re-established in 1468, following the Second Peace of Thorn. The first Komtur of Rhein was Friedrich von Wallenrode, brother of Teutonic Grand Master Konrad von Wallenrode, while the best-known one was Rudolf von Tippelskirch, who was also involved in the colonisation of Prussia. After the secularisation of the State of the Teutonic Order Rhein was part of the Duchy of Prussia, a vassal state of Poland, in 1525, an "Amtshauptmann" office was established in Rhein, which remained in use until 1775. In the 16th century the town's and district's population was almost entirely Polish.

During Tatar attacks in Masuria, the village was burned down on 7 February 1657, and many inhabitants were kidnapped. In 1657, Brandenburg gained full suzerainty over the Duchy of Prussia from Poland.

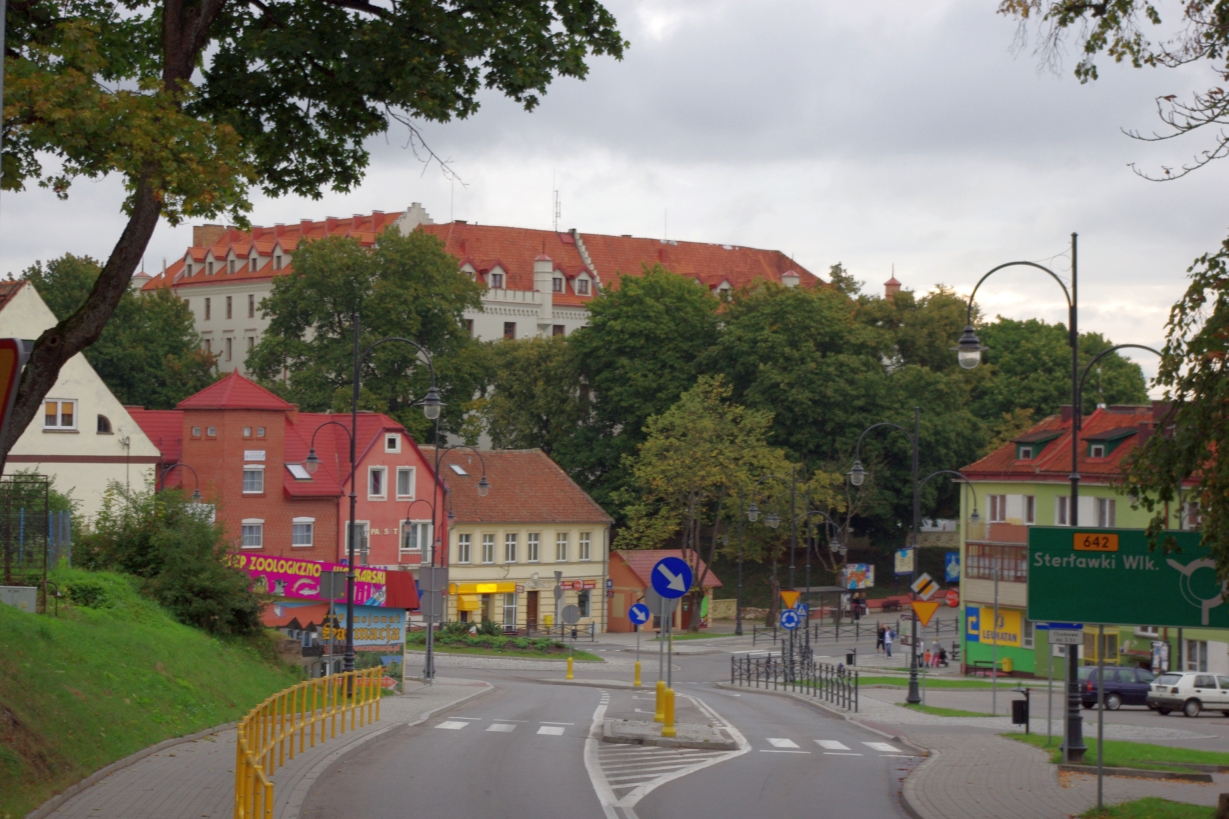
Town center

In 1701 Rhein became part of the Kingdom of Prussia. Between 1709–1711, it suffered from plague. Despite these setbacks, King Frederick William I of Prussia granted the town its town charter in 1723. The decisive reason for this was the role of Rhein as an administration center for a larger rural area. At that time church services were held only in Polish.

During the Napoleonic Wars, soldiers took up quarters in Rhein. The development of the town largely stagnated during the 19th and 20th centuries. It was not until 1902 that Rhein received a railroad connection, though it was only a one-track link of a light railway with a narrow gauge. Additionally, the castle was bought and converted into a prison in 1853, and suffered a fire in 1881, after which it was not fully rebuilt until thirty years later.

Rhein was administered by Landkreis Lötzen within East Prussia from 1818–1945. The town became part of the German Empire after the unification of Germany by Prussia in 1871. As a result of the Treaty of Versailles the 1920 East Prussian plebiscite was organized on 11 July 1920 under the control of the League of Nations, which resulted in 1,460 votes to remain in Germany and none for Poland. A Nazi German prison was located in the town. After Germany's defeat in World War II, the town became part of Poland due to the borders changes dictated by the Potsdam Agreement.

== Population ==
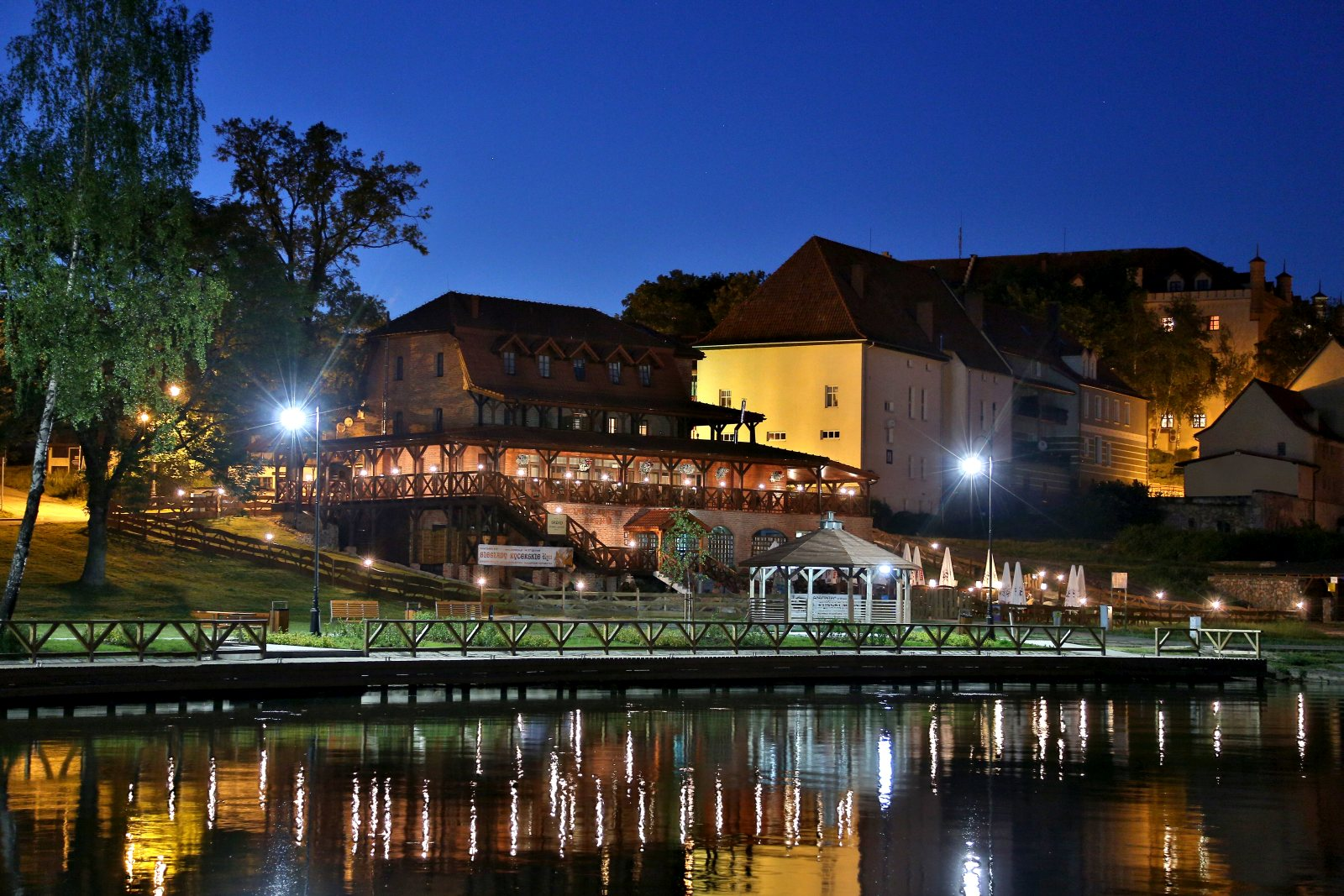
Ryn at night

- 1782: 1000
- 1885: 2285
- 1925: 2084
- 2005: 3037

== Sports ==
The local football club is Pogoń Ryn. It competes in the lower leagues.

== Notable residents ==
- Nicholas von Renys (1360–1411), secular member of the Teutonic Knights
- Bruno Hofer (1861–1916), fishery scientist
- Doris Kilias (1942–2008), German Arabist and translator

== See also ==
- Ryn Castle
