= Occasio =

Occasio may refer to:

- Latin name for Caerus, personification of opportunity
- A branch design of Washington Mutual
