= Caerus =

Mythical son of Zeus, personification of Kairos

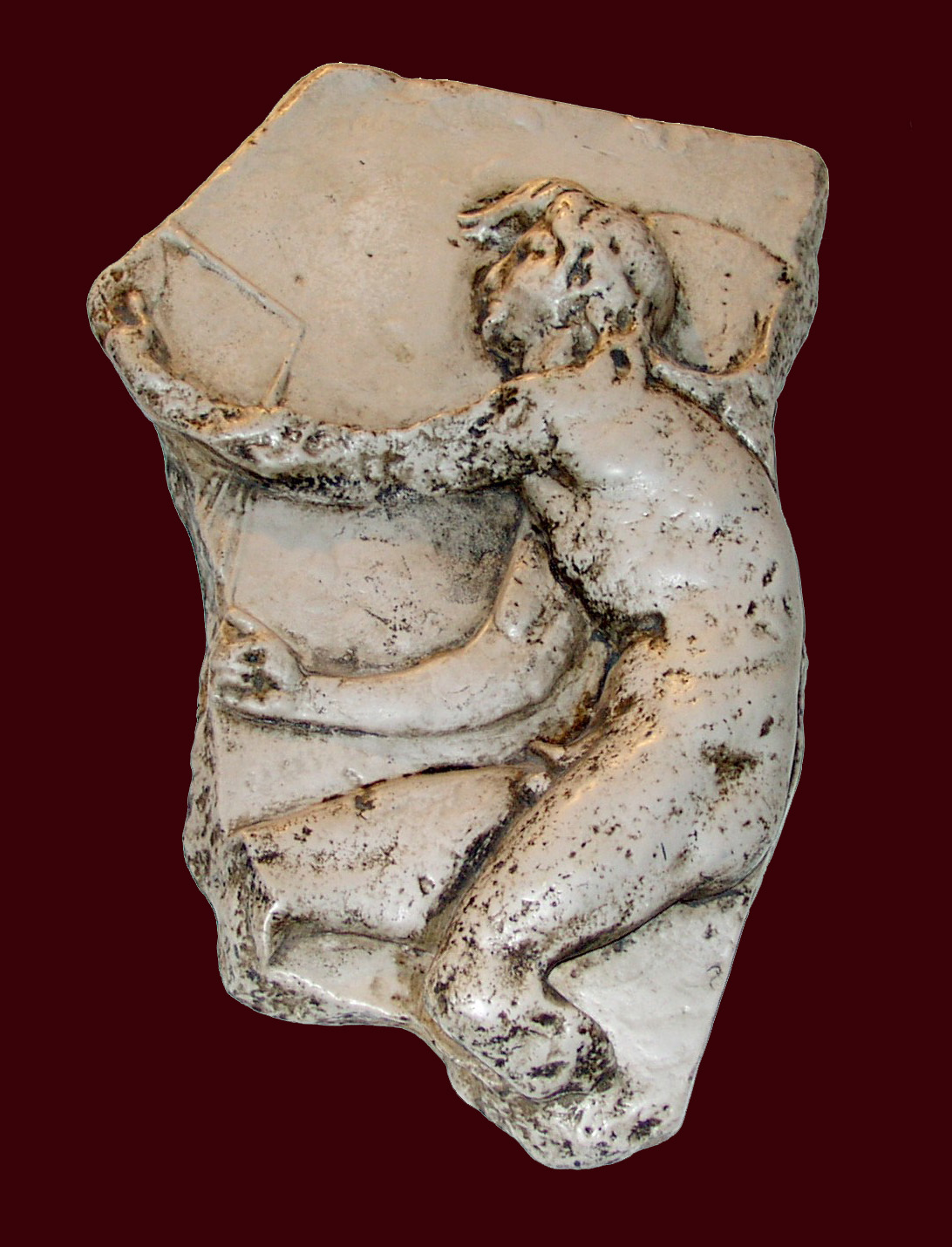
Kairos relief, copy of Lysippos, found in Trogir, Croatia.

In Greek mythology, Caerus /ˈsɪərəs, ˈsiːrəs/ (Greek: Καιρός, Kairos, the same as kairos) was the personification of opportunity, luck and favorable moments. He was shown with only one lock of hair. His Roman equivalent was Occasio or Tempus. Caerus was the youngest son of Zeus.

Caerus is the due measure that achieves the aim. This god brings about what is convenient, fit, and comes in the right moment. Sometimes it could be the critical or dangerous moment, but more often Caerus represents the advantageous, or favorable occasion. Hence, what is opportune, or "Opportunity." In the Hellenistic age (as P. Chantraine informs us), the term was also used as "time" or "season" (the good time, or good season).

According to Pausanias, there was an altar of Caerus close to the entrance to the stadium at Olympia, for Opportunity is regarded as a divinity and not as a mere allegory. This indefatigable traveler also tells us that Caerus was regarded as the youngest child of Zeus in a hymn by Ion of Chios (ca. 490-425 BC).

== Appearance ==
Caerus is represented as a young and beautiful god. Opportunity obviously never gets old, and beauty is always opportune, flourishing in its own season. Caerus stands on tiptoe because he is always running, and like Hermes, he has wings in his feet to fly with the wind. He holds a razor, or else scales balanced on a sharp edge—attributes illustrating the fleeting instant in which occasions appear and disappear. A. Fairbanks (translator of Callistratus) suggests that the type of the statue of Opportunity was developed out of the form of the Hermes that granted victory in athletic contests.

Caerus can easily be seized by the hair hanging over his face ("creeping down over the eyebrows") when he is arriving. But once he has passed by, no one can grasp him, the back of his head being bald. The moment of action is gone with his hair: a neglected occasion cannot be recovered. The author of Ekphráseis (Descriptions) found that the statue of Caerus at Sicyon resembled Dionysus, with his forehead glistening with graces and a delicate blush on his cheeks: "... though it was bronze, it blushed; and though it was hard by nature, it melted into softness". And like the statue is Opportunity himself, he melts into softness if caught by the forelock, but once he has raced by, he assumes his hard nature and seldom grants a second chance.

== Representations ==
According to ancient Greeks, Kairos was the god of the "fleeting moment"; "a favorable opportunity opposing the fate of man". Such a moment must be grasped (by the tuft of hair on the personified forehead of the fleeting opportunity); otherwise the moment is gone and can not be re-captured (personified by the back of head being bald).

A bronze statue of Kairos is known in literature, made by the famous Greek sculptor Lysippos. It stood at his home, in the Agora of Hellenistic Sikyon. The following epigram by Poseidippos was carved on the statue:

Who and whence was the sculptor? From Sikyon.
And his name? Lysippos.
And who are you? Time who subdues all things.
Why do you stand on tip-toe? I am ever running.
And why you have a pair of wings on your feet? I fly with the wind.
And why do you hold a razor in your right hand? As a sign to men that I am sharper than any sharp edge.
And why does your hair hang over your face? For him who meets me to take me by the forelock.
And why, in Heaven's name, is the back of your head bald? Because none whom I have once raced by on my winged feet will now, though he wishes it sore, take hold of me from behind.

Why did the artist fashion you? For your sake, stranger, and he set me up in the porch as a lesson.

This statue was the original model for the various representations of Kairos made in ancient times and Middle Ages as well. John Tzetzes wrote about it, as well as Himerius. The image of hair hanging on the forehead and a bald back of the head. For instance Disticha Catonis II, 26 refers to the Latin concept of Occasio (a female word which can be considered as a literal translation of the Greek Kairos) in these terms: "Rem tibi quam scieris aptam dimittere noli: fronte capillata, post haec occasio calva", which means "Don't let that what you consider good for you escape by; chance has hair over her forehead, but behind she's bald". Phaedrus (V,8) has a similar writing and he himself admits that the theme was not his own but more ancient. Callistratus (Descriptions, 6) has a long text describing the statue by Lysippos.

In Trogir (the ancient Roman Tragurium), Croatia, in the Convent of the Benedictine Nuns, was displayed a marble bas-relief of Kairos from the 3rd century B.C., as a young man, running. The bas-relief is now kept at the Municipal Museum of Trogir.

The theme of Kairos was felt as extremely important during the Middle Ages. Carmina Burana 16, a famous poem about Fortune, mentions Kairos in this way: "verum est quod legitur, fronte capillata, sed plerumque sequitur occasio calvata"; which means "As it is read, it is true that that a forehead may have hair, but it is usually followed by the arrival of baldness". Several representations of Kairos survive; a relief (about AD 160) is kept at the Museum of Antiquities of Turin (Italy); another relief was kept (now lost) at Palazzo Medici in Florence; an onyx gem (originally from the collection of the Duc de Blacas, 1st-2nd century AD) with an incision of the god Tempus with attributes of Kairos is kept now at the British Museum; a marble relief showing Kairos, Bios (the Life), and Metanoia (Afterthought, the female Latin Paenitentia) is in the cathedral of Torcello (11th century); a monochrome fresco by Mantegna at Palazzo Ducale in Mantua (about 1510) shows a female Kairos (most probably Occasio) with a young man trying to catch her and a woman representing Paenitentia.

Kairos is a novel by German author Jenny Erpenbeck published in 2021. The novel tells the story of a doomed love affair, set against the backdrop of the collapse of the German Democratic Republic with the two lovers seemingly embodying East Germany's crushed idealism. The title refers to the Greek god of opportunity.
