= Volker Hage =

German journalist, author and literary critic (1949–2026)

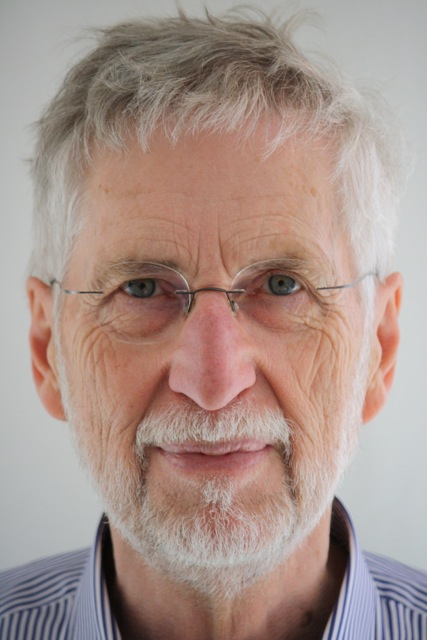
- Hage in 2015
- Born: 9 September 1949; Hamburg, West Germany
- Died: 29 April 2026 (aged 76); Hamburg, Germany
- Occupations: Journalist; literary critic; author

Volker Hage (9 September 1949 – 29 April 2026) was a German journalist, literary critic, and novelist.

== Life and career ==
Hage began his career as a journalist in 1975 as an editor for Frankfurter Allgemeine Zeitung, working initially for the Literature section and later for the newspaper's weekly “FAZ Magazin” colour supplement. From 1986 through to 1992 he was chief literary editor of another leading (West) German newspaper, Die Zeit, for which he subsequently continued to write. From 1992 he worked on Der Spiegel where he served as culture editor (“Redakteur im Kulturressort”). He was the founder of the periodical “Deutsche Literatur” (“German Literature”), published by Reclam and he produced various anthologies and collections.

From 1988 through to 1994 Hage was a member of the jury for the annual Ingeborg Bachmann Prize contest, which is an event broadcast on television of Austria, Germany and Switzerland. More recently, in 2005 and 2006, he sat on the jury for the German Book Prize.

Hage wrote biographies of Max Frisch, Walter Kempowski, John Updike, Philip Roth and (combined with Mathias Schreiber) of Marcel Reich-Ranicki. He was also involved in rediscovering the ”realist” genre work of the writer Gert Ledig. This came during the course of Hage’s contributions to the debates, initiated by Max Sebald, about the literary treatment of the bombing of German cities during the Second World War. Hage was particularly effective as an advocate for Ledig’s second novel, Vergeltung, a powerfully apocalyptical and autobiographical anti-war narrative.

In a two-edged assessment, fellow critic Marcel Reich-Ranicki wrote that Hage’s style of literary criticism had the great advantage that you always knew in advance precisely what he wanted to say.

As a retired journalist Hage began to reinvent himself as a novelist. He published in 2015 the novel Die freie Liebe concerning a love triangle amidst the cultural changes of the 1970s in Germany. The biographic novel Des Lebens fünfter Akt (Luchterhand 2018) narrates the last years of the life of Austrian writer Arthur Schnitzler.

Hage died in Hamburg on 29 April 2026, at the age of 76.

== Publications ==
- Max Frisch (Rowohlts Monographien 321). Rowohlt, Reinbek 1983, ISBN 3-499-50321-2
- Alles erfunden: Porträts deutscher und amerikanischer Autoren. Rowohlt, Reinbek 1988, ISBN 3-498-02888-X
- Marcel Reich-Ranicki. Kiepenheuer und Witsch, Cologne 1995, ISBN 3-462-02365-9 (gemeinsam mit Mathias Schreiber)
- Auf den Spuren der Dichtung. Reisen zu berühmten Schauplätzen der Literatur. Goldmann, Munich 1997, ISBN 3-442-75005-9
- Propheten im eigenen Land. Auf der Suche nach der deutschen Literatur. Deutscher Taschenbuchverlag, Munich 1999, ISBN 3-423-12692-2
- Zeugen der Zerstörung: die Literaten und der Luftkrieg. S. Fischer, Frankfurt am Main 2003, ISBN 3-10-028901-3
- John Updike: eine Biographie. Rowohlt, Reinbek 2007, ISBN 3-498-02989-4
- Letzte Tänze, erste Schritte: deutsche Literatur der Gegenwart. Deutsche Verlagsanstalt, Munich 2007, ISBN 3-421-04285-3
- Philip Roth. Bücher und Begegnungen. Hanser, Munich 2008, ISBN 3-446-23016-5
- Kritik für Leser: Vom Schreiben über Literatur, Suhrkamp Verlag, Berlin 2009, ISBN 978-3-518-46107-5
- Schiller. Vom Feuerkopf zum Klassiker. btb Verlag, Munich 2009, ISBN 3-442-74009-6
- Walter Kempowski, Bücher und Begegnungen. Knaus Verlag, Munich 2009, ISBN 978-3-8135-0337-1
- Max Frisch - Sein Leben in Bildern und Texten, Suhrkamp Verlag, Berlin 2011, ISBN 978-3-518-42212-0
- Die freie Liebe, Luchterhand Literaturverlag, Munich 2015, ISBN 978-3-630-87468-5
- Des Lebens fünfter Akt: Roman, Luchterhand, Munich 2018, ISBN 978-3-630-87592-7
