= The Future of Truth (Herzog book) =

2024 book by Werner Herzog

- Author: Werner Herzog
- Original title: Die Zukunft der Wahrheit
- Translator: Michael Hofmann
- Language: German
- Publisher: Carl Hanser Verlag
- Publication date: 19 February 2024
- Publication place: Germany
- English publication date: 16 October 2025
- Pages: 112
- ISBN: 978-3-446-27943-8

The Future of Truth (German: Die Zukunft der Wahrheit) is a 2024 book by the German filmmaker Werner Herzog.

== Summary ==
The book consists of reflections and anecdotes about truth and its representation, especially as it relates to Herzog's documentary films and his concept of "ecstatic truth", which is when a truth that is hidden by specific facts or conceptions becomes reachable through poetic imagination. It contains various historical anecdotes and goes into existing and emerging issues with fabricated news stories and fraudulent material generated through artificial intelligence. Herzog emphasises that he has not written a philosophy book or a self-help book, but to avoid perils, he recommends people to actively cultivate critical thinking, to take more walks and to read more books.

== Reception ==
Carl Hanser Verlag published the book in German in 2024 and The Bodley Head published Michael Hofmann's English translation in 2025. Publishers Weekly called the book "a mixed bag" with "evocative prose" and "a familiar and somewhat fuzzy defense of poetic license". The Guardian's Farrah Jarral wrote about the book: "I can't quite decide if it is absurd, profound or an ecstatically truthful mix of the two". Felix Haas, writing for World Literature Today, called it "a loose collection of lies, fakery, and misinformation, sprinkled with memories of the author’s own projects, rather than a rigorous analysis that leads to a concise thesis or recommendation."
