= Ryn Castle =

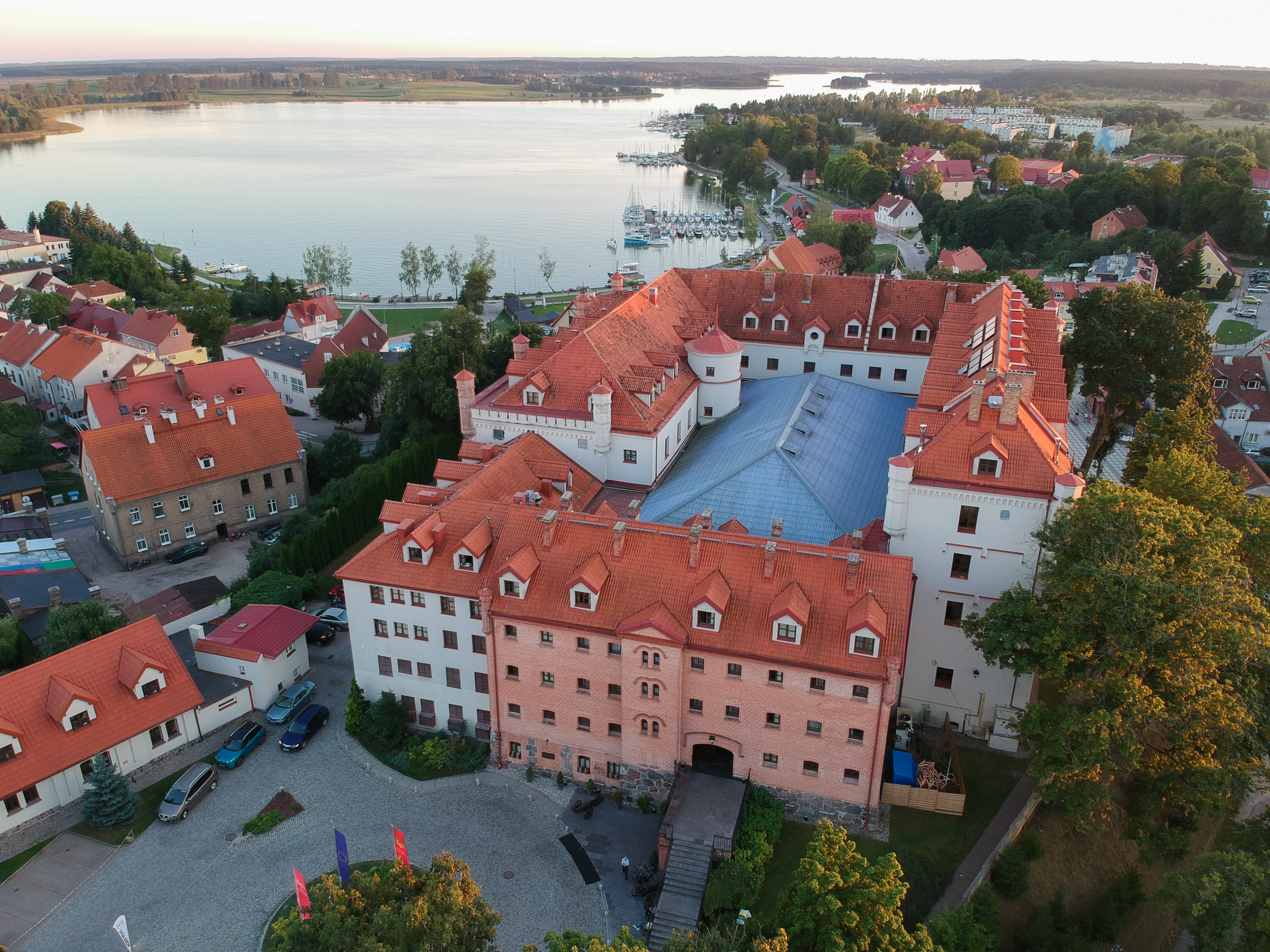
- Bird's eye view of Ryn Castle

- Location of Ryn Castle in Poland Ryn Castle (Warmian-Masurian Voivodeship)
- 53°56′18″N 21°32′45″E
- Location: Ryn, Warmian-Masurian Voivodeship, in Poland

History
- Built: 1377

Site notes
- Architectural style: Gothic

Ryn Castle is a fourteenth-century castle located between Ryn and Ołów Lake, by Liberty Square (Plac Wolności) in Ryn, Poland.

== History ==
Ryn Castle is a late fortress built by the Teutonic Order. The fortress was built in the place of a former, smaller stronghold, as ordered by the Grand Master of the Teutonic Order Winrich von Kniprode in c. 1377, to serve as a convent and a headquarters for launching attacks against the Grand Duchy of Lithuania to its east. In 1410, after the Teutonic defeat at the Battle of Grunwald, the castle's fortifications were dismantled, limited to one Gothic building in the eastern part of the castle-complex. At the onset of the Thirteen Years' War, in 1455, the castle was occupied by local peasants, later recovered by George von Schlieben, whom massacred the peasants in front of the castle at the Battle of Ryn.

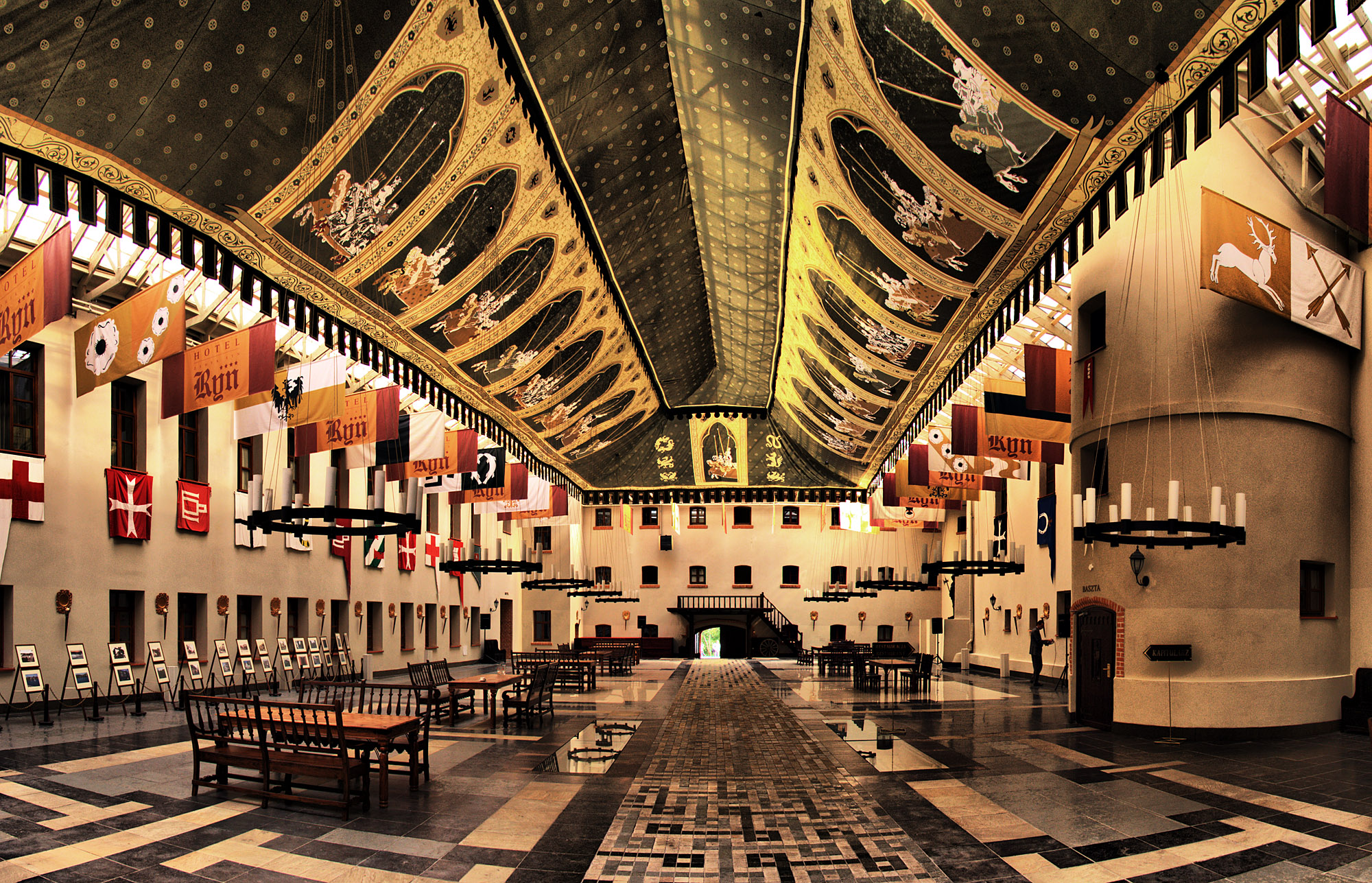
Knights' Hall

In 1525, the castle became the residence of the Duke of Royal Prussia. During the Deluge, in 1657, the castle was burned down by Tatars. By the beginning of the nineteenth-century, the castle was a private residence. After being bought back, in 1853, the Prussian authorities reutilised it into a prison.

The castle burned down in 1881. After 1945, the castle was adapted to serve as a community centre, a small museum and the municipal council. After 1990, the town authorities sold the property to a private person, that adapted it into a four-star hotel (Hotel Zamek Ryn****).
