= The Stalin Organ =

1955 novel by Gert Ledig

- Author: Gert Ledig
- Original title: Die Stalinorgel
- Language: German
- Publisher: Claassen-Verlag
- Publication date: 1955
- Publication place: West Germany
- English publication date: 1956
- Pages: 221

The Stalin Organ (German: Die Stalinorgel) is a 1955 novel by the German writer Gert Ledig. It is about the fighting between Germany and the Soviet Union outside Leningrad in the summer of 1942, inspired by Ledig's own World War II experience. It frequently switches between perspectives and focuses on the brutality of warfare and the logic of bureaucratic orders, with no attention to ideology. The scholar Nil Santiáñez likens it to Curzio Malaparte's Kaputt due to its focus on spatiality and shifting perspectives.

The book had a positive critical reception in West Germany and abroad. It was first published in English in 1956 as The Naked Hill in the United Kingdom and The Tortured Earth in the United States. A new translation by Michael Hofmann was published in 2004 in the United Kingdom as The Stalin Organ and in 2005 in the United States as The Stalin Front: A Novel of World War II. Hofmann's translation was the runner-up for the 2005 Schlegel-Tieck Prize.

The Stalin Organ was Ledig's debut novel and the first in a trilogy of World War II novels inspired by his experiences as a soldier. It was followed by Payback (1956) and The Brutal Years (1957).

== See also ==
- Katyusha rocket launcher, "Stalin's organ"
- Siege of Leningrad
