= Go, Went, Gone =

2015 novel by Jenny Erpenbeck

- Author: Jenny Erpenbeck
- Original title: Gehen, ging, gegangen
- Translator: Susan Bernofsky
- Publisher: Granta
- Publication date: 2015
- English publication date: 2017
- ISBN: 9781846276217

Go, Went, Gone is a 2015 novel by German writer Jenny Erpenbeck, translated into English by Susan Bernofsky in 2017.

== Reception ==
The Guardian reviewed the book, saying Erpenbeck's "new novel resonates with an unexpected simplicity that is profound, unsettling and subtle."
