= Kairos (novel) =

2021 novel by Jenny Erpenbeck

- Author: Jenny Erpenbeck
- Original title: Kairos
- Translator: Michael Hofmann
- Publisher: Penguin Verlag
- Publication date: 2021
- English publication date: 2023

Kairos is a 2021 novel by German author Jenny Erpenbeck. It received Germany's Uwe Johnson Prize in 2022. The English translation, by Michael Hofmann, published in the U.S. by New Directions and in the U.K. by Granta Books, was shortlisted for the U.S. National Book Award for Translated Literature in 2023 and won the International Booker Prize in 2024.

The novel tells the story of a doomed and increasingly toxic age-gap relationship, set against the backdrop of the collapse of the GDR, with the two lovers seemingly embodying East Germany's crushed idealism.

Eleanor Wachtel, the chair of the International Booker Prize 2024 judges, said of the book after it won the prize: "In luminous prose, Jenny Erpenbeck exposes the complexity of a relationship between a young student and a much older writer, tracking the daily tensions and reversals that mark their intimacy, staying close to the apartments, cafés, and city streets, workplaces and foods of East Berlin. It starts with love and passion, but it's at least as much about power, art and culture. The self-absorption of the lovers, their descent into a destructive vortex, remains connected to the larger history of East Germany during this period, often meeting history at odd angles."

In an interview with the Booker Prizes website, Erpenbeck said: "It's a private story of a big love and its decay, but it's also a story of the dissolution of a whole political system. Simply put: How can something that seems right in the beginning turn into something wrong?"

Erpenbeck is the first German writer to win the annual International Booker Prize, which is awarded jointly to the author and translator of the best work of fiction translated into English and published in the UK or Ireland. Likewise, Hofmann is the first male translator to receive the award.

== Reviews ==
Kairos received critical acclaim. TIME Magazine named Kairos one of the 100 must-read books of 2023 and praised Erpenbeck's prose. Natasha Walter, writing for The Guardian, called the novel "one of the bleakest and most beautiful novels I have ever read"; Declan Ryan, likewise writing for The Guardian, praised Hofmann's translation and called the novel "absorbing". Dwight Garner, writing for the New York Times, called the novel "profound" and "moving" and praised Erpenbeck as "among the most sophisticated and powerful novelists we have."
