= Jenny Erpenbeck =

German writer and opera director (born 1967)

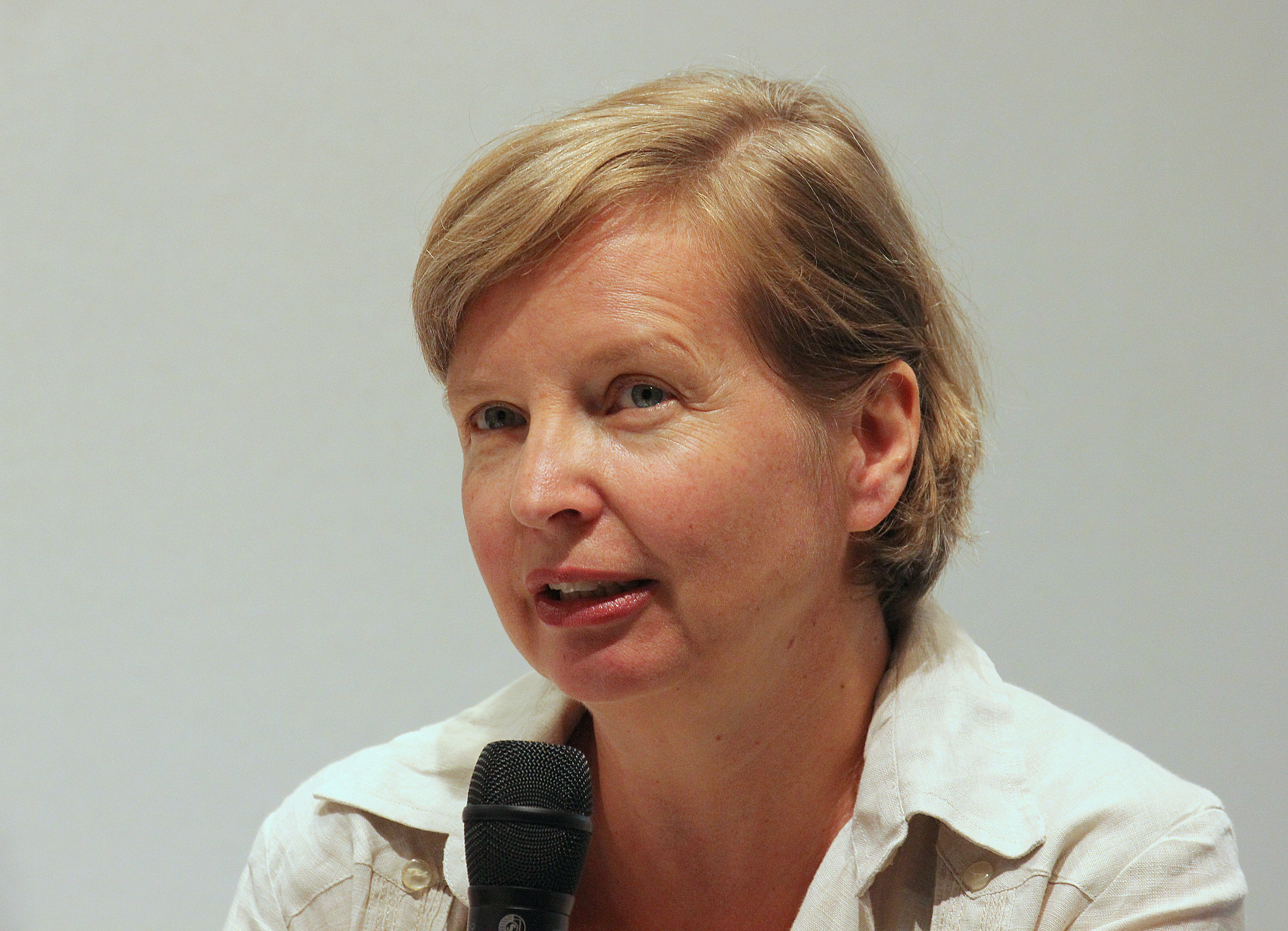
- Erpenbeck in 2018
- Born: 12 March 1967 (age 59); East Berlin, East Germany
- Education: Humboldt University of Berlin; Hanns Eisler Music Conservatory
- Writing career
- Language: German
- Notable awards: Independent Foreign Fiction Prize; International Booker Prize

Jenny Erpenbeck (German pronunciation: [ˈdʒɛni ˈɛʁpm̩bɛk]; born 12 March 1967) is a German writer and opera director. She won the 2015 Independent Foreign Fiction Prize for The End of Days and the 2024 International Booker Prize for Kairos.

== Life ==
Born in East Berlin, Erpenbeck is the daughter of physicist, philosopher and writer John Erpenbeck and Arabic translator Doris Kilias. Her paternal grandparents, Fritz Erpenbeck and Hedda Zinner, were both authors and members of the East German cultural elite. In Berlin she attended an Advanced High School, from which she graduated in 1985. As a child, she lived in Italy for a year. She completed a two-year apprenticeship as a bookbinder before working at several theatres as props and wardrobe supervisor.

From 1988 to 1990, Erpenbeck studied theatre at the Humboldt University of Berlin. In 1990, she changed her studies to Music Theater Director (studying with, among others, Ruth Berghaus, Heiner Müller and Peter Konwitschny) at the Hanns Eisler Music Conservatory. After the successful completion of her studies in 1994, with a production of Béla Bartók's opera Duke Bluebeard's Castle in her parish church and in the Kunsthaus Tacheles, she spent some time at first as an assistant director at the opera house in Graz, where in 1997 she did her own productions of Schoenberg's Erwartung, Bartók's Duke Bluebeard's Castle and a world premiere of her own piece Cats Have Seven Lives. In 1998, as a freelance director, she directed productions in several opera houses in Germany and Austria, including Monteverdi's L'Orfeo in Aachen, Acis and Galatea at the Berlin State Opera and Wolfgang Amadeus Mozart's Zaide in Nuremberg/Erlangen.

In the 1990s, Erpenbeck started a writing career in addition to her directing. She later said, "the end of the system that I knew, that I grew up in — this made me write.” She is author of narrative prose and plays: her debut novella in 1999, Geschichte vom alten Kind (The Old Child); in 2001, her collection of stories Tand (Trinkets); in 2004, the novella Wörterbuch (The Book of Words); and in 2008, the novel Heimsuchung (Visitation). In 2007, Erpenbeck took over a biweekly column by Nicole Krauss in the Frankfurter Allgemeine Zeitung. In 2015, the English translation of her novel Aller Tage Abend (The End of Days) by Susan Bernofsky won the Independent Foreign Fiction Prize.

In September 2023, the English translation of Kairos by Michael Hofmann was longlisted for the National Book Award for Translated Literature In 2024, Erpenbeck became the first German writer to win the International Booker Prize for Kairos, which is also the first novel originally written in German to win the award.

"Thirty years have passed since the country in which I was born is gone, so I could dare to look back and take my time to carefully research what I lived through without really being aware of it," she said.

Erpenbeck's works have been translated into Danish, English, French, Greek, Hebrew, Dutch, Swedish, Slovene, Spanish, Hungarian, Japanese, Korean, Lithuanian, Norwegian, Polish, Portuguese, Romanian, Russian, Arabic, Estonian, Turkish, Croatian and Finnish.

Erpenbeck lives in Berlin with her husband, conductor Wolfgang Bozic, and her son.

== Works ==
=== Novels ===
- Heimsuchung (2008). Visitation, trans. Susan Bernofsky (New Directions, 2010; Portobello, 2011).
- Aller Tage Abend (2012). The End of Days, trans. Susan Bernofsky (New Directions, 2014; Portobello, 2015).
- Gehen, ging, gegangen (2015). Go, Went, Gone, trans. Susan Bernofsky (New Directions/Portobello, 2017).
- Kairos (2021). Trans. Michael Hofmann (Granta/New Directions, 2023).

=== Novellas and short story collections ===
- Geschichte vom alten Kind (1999). The Old Child, trans. Susan Bernofsky.
  - Published with five stories from Tand as The Old Child and Other Stories (New Directions, 2005), and in The Old Child and The Book of Words (Portobello, 2008).
- Tand (2001). Trinkets. Short stories.
- Wörterbuch (2004). The Book of Words, trans. Susan Bernofsky (New Directions/Portobello, 2007), and in The Old Child and The Book of Words (Portobello, 2008).

=== Essay collections ===
- Dinge, die verschwinden (2009). Things That Disappear, trans. Kurt Beals (New Directions/Granta, 2025).
- Kein Roman: Texte 1992 bis 2018 (2018). Not a Novel: A Memoir in Pieces, trans. Kurt Beals (New Directions/Granta, 2020).

=== Plays ===
- Katzen haben sieben Leben (2000). Cats Have Nine Lives, trans. Di Brandt (2019).
- Leibesübungen für eine Sünderin (2003). Physical Exercises for a Sinner.
- Schmutzige Nacht (2015)
- Lot (2017)

== Audiobooks ==
- 2016: Heimsuchung (novel, read by Jenny Erpenbeck), publisher: der Hörverlag, (Audiobook-Download)
- 2021: Kairos (novel, read by Jenny Erpenbeck), publisher: der Hörverlag, (Audiobook-Download)

== Awards and honours ==
- 2001: Jury Prize at the Ingeborg Bachmann Competition in Klagenfurt
- 2001: Several residencies (Ledig Rowohlt House in New York, Künstlerhaus Schloss Wiepersdorf)
- 2004: GEDOK literature prize
- 2006: Winner of the Scholarship Island Writers on Sylt
- 2008: Solothurner Literaturpreis
- 2008: Heimito von Doderer Literature Prize
- 2008: Hertha-Koenig-Literature Prize
- 2009: Award of the North LiteraTour
- 2010: Literature Prize of the Steel Foundation Eisenhüttenstadt
- 2011: Jewish Quarterly-Wingate Prize, shortlisted for Visitation
- 2013: Joseph Breitbach Prize
- 2014: Hans Fallada Prize
- 2015: Independent Foreign Fiction Prize, winner for The End of Days (prize shared with the book's translator, Susan Bernofsky)
- 2016: International Dublin Literary Award, shortlisted for The End of Days
- 2016: Thomas Mann Prize
- 2017: Strega European Prize
- 2017: Order of Merit of the Federal Republic of Germany
- 2018: Go, Went, Gone New York Times Notable Book List 2018
- 2019: The Guardian ranked Visitation number 90 in its list of 100 Best Books of the 21st Century.
- 2022: Uwe Johnson Prize for Kairos
- 2024: The International Booker Prize for Kairos
- 2026: James Tait Black Memorial Prize for biography, shortlisted for Things that Disappear
