= Payback (novel) =

1956 novel by Gert Ledig

Payback (German: Vergeltung) is the second novel of the German writer Gert Ledig (1921-1999). It is an apocalyptic autobiographical anti-war novel. It mines the author's own experiences and is considered an important example of the literary realism genre of postwar novel.

The book was originally published in late 1956, by the long established Frankfurt publishing house S. Fischer Verlag. It deals with 70 minutes of a mid-night bomb attack by the United States Army Air Forces against an unnamed German city towards the end of World War II, during which a large number of civilians and military personnel are killed. The events are described from both the American and German perspectives with great directness, and without shielding the reader from the horrific details.

Ledig's first novel The Stalin Organ (Die Stalinorgel), which dealt with the battles of the Russian Front in the Leningrad region in the Soviet Union, had been an international success. By contrast, Payback was widely rejected by readers when it appeared in 1956. The book was quickly forgotten and there were no plans for a reprint. That changed in the late 1990s, shortly before the author's death, when the book encountered much more widespread acceptance, led by scholar-critics including Max Sebald, Marcel Reich-Ranicki and Volker Hage. Payback now acquired a correspondingly wider readership, with several new editions published by Suhrkamp Verlag starting in 1999. Translations followed into Dutch (entitled Vergelding, meaning "Retribution") in 2001; English (as Payback) and French (as Sous les bombes – "Under the Bombs") in 2003; Spanish (as Represalia – "Reprisal") in 2006; and Croatian (as Odmazda – "Reprisal") in 2008. At the same time a new interest in Ledig's literary output emerged among critics and readers, which would outlive the author himself. In effect, shortly before he died Ledig found himself “rediscovered” by the literary establishment.

== The storylines ==
Payback deals with the fates of the inhabitants and defenders of an unnamed German city and of an American bomber crew that has approached the city in a formation of bombers. In total twelve storylines can be identified, all connected with the air attack, and all given more or less equal weight, even though they differ greatly in terms of their more detailed narratives.

Eight of the twelve storylines focus on a single character or group of characters. For instance, during the attack the bomber is shot down by a German fighter-plane and the crew are forced to evacuate. The American pilot, named "Sergeant Jonathan Strenehen", having survived a crash landing, falls into the hands of some Germans and is gruesomely abused physically, contrary to the provisions of to the Geneva Convention which guarantee the "bodily integrity" of prisoners of war. This occurs despite Strenehen having taken care to crash land his bomber on a public cemetery in order to spare the civilian population - something of which his German captors are unaware. Later two German civilians do come to help Strenehen, but in the end he nevertheless dies as a consequence of brutal treatment received from German civilians whose sadistic actions can be traced back to their awful experience of the aerial bombings.

Other storylines concerns the fate of the suicidal Cheovski couple, a rescue squad, a group of forced laborers from Eastern Europe, a war-shattered lieutenant from a "Flak squadron", a group of drunken soldiers and a man looking for his family driven almost mad by his predicament. Another of the threads presents a young woman driven to an air-raid shelter by the bombs and later raped by an old German man, reacting under the exceptional circumstances, and who himself later commits suicide. Four other storylines each focus on just one scene or circumstance. These concern an air defense position, a coordination command post, a huge concrete bunker along the lines of those that existed only in the largest cities such as Berlin and Vienna, and a transformer station for the municipal power supply.

With the exception of Sgt. Jonathan Strenehen, who is the mostly fully formed of the protagonists and whose fate is spelled out, it is generally left for the reader to decide which, if any, of the participants in the various storylines survive the bombing raid.

== Structural aspects ==
The novel is divided into thirteen chapters which are sandwiched between a prologue and an epilogue that includes precise information on the time of day covered. The length of time taken by the events recounted exceeds by a good hour the 70 minutes actually covered. From this it is to be inferred that the episodes presented take place simultaneously.

All the chapters are composed of short or very short fragments of text. These present snapshots of the respective plot lines and are arranged in a way that provides the reader with an initially confusing experience. Thus the novel's structure reflects and communicates the disorientating impact of a bomb attack on the characters on the novel. Each chapter starts with an italicized autobiographical interlude, reporting in the first person on the fate of one of the characters, using the formats of letters, personal résumés and monologues. However, this novel provides no continuous action driven narrative, but comprises a succession of short episodes that pick-up on earlier plot-lines and progress them briefly before moving on. What takes place is therefore a constant staccato of rapidly changing locations, narratives and players. In this way the structure resembles that of some movies.

There is little use of protagonists in the traditional sense, to define and progress the storylines. The book is driven, rather, by events around which the central conflicts revolve. Many of the characters are identified only by a military rank or by their profession, and this feeds the impression of a collectivized experience. To some extent narrative context is provided by the brief quasi-autobiographical sketches appearing in italic font at the start of each chapter, but these are nonetheless incomplete and fragmentary.

Apart from those short biographical sections, the narrative developments are presented directly from the author. The all-knowing narrator, who does not himself participate in the action, communicates the thoughts and feelings of the various participants, but he does this by concentrating on external manifestations, and avoids comments or value judgements, leaving it for the reader to form any required assessments of characters' inner motivations and reactions. Through this overwhelmingly neutral narrative stance, which comes close to resembling a documentary approach, the novel becomes authentic and powerfully plausible. At the same time the sparsity of commentary summons up a bleak underlying nihilism. Exceptionally, right at the end, the writer breaches his neutral narrative stance for a moment. The narrator uses the authority which his objectivity has established through the novel to communicate that the allied bombing of German cities in the Second World War had become unavoidable, but in the same breath he denies the allied forces any general right to act as they did, while a Christian concept teaches that issues of moral authority regarding such matters must be reserved for the Last Judgment.

== Style ==
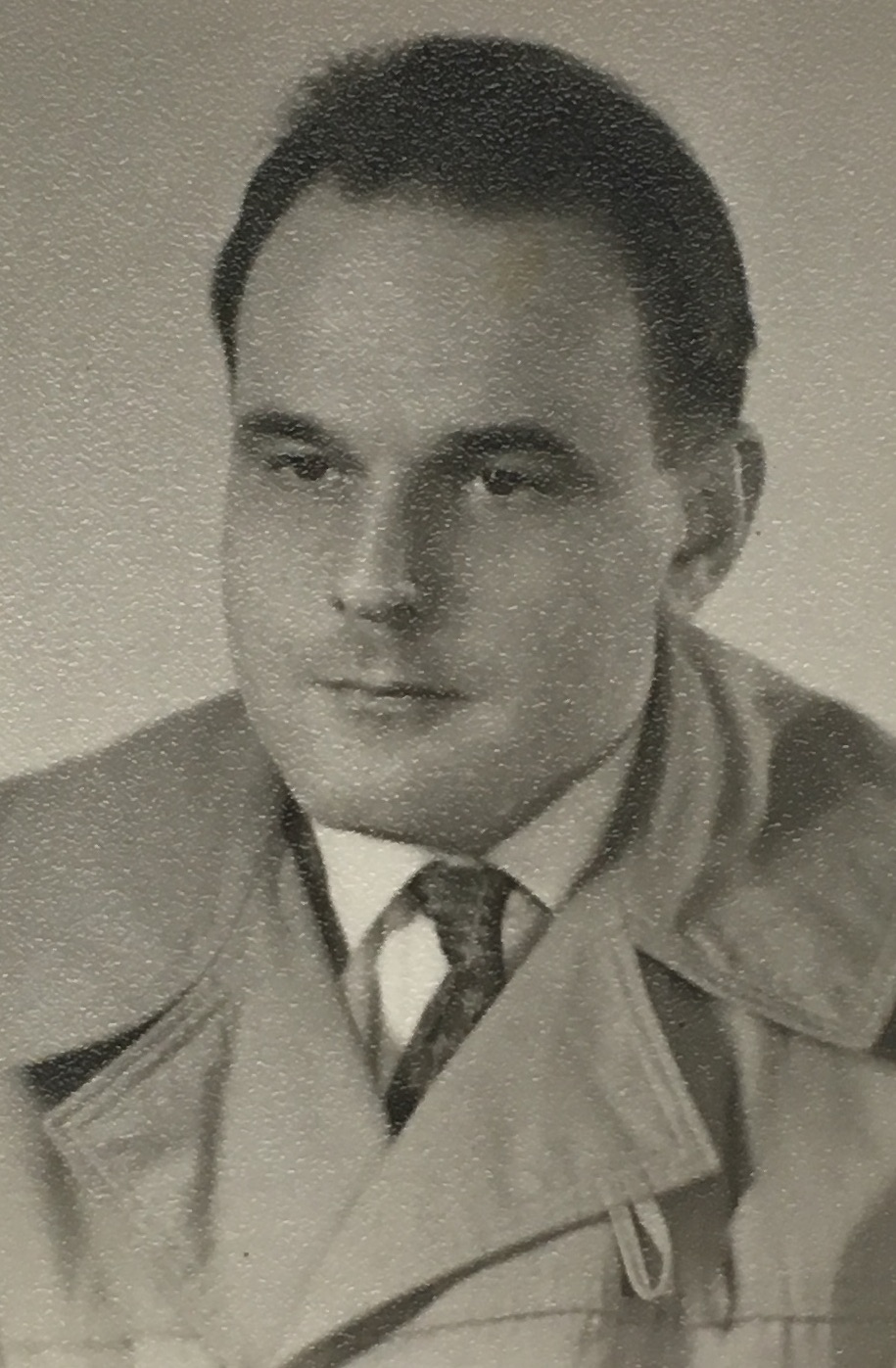
Gert Ledig

The language in Ledig's second novel comes across as highly laconic and staccato. The rapid narrative pace is reminiscent of the postwar Trümmerliteratur employed by Günter Eich in the lyric piece Inventur (poem). Much the same can be said of Gert Ledig's use of parataxis, declamatory statements, ellipsis and the relatively low level of visual imagery. Value related adjectives and adverbs are applied sparingly, in order to reinforce the impression of realism and the impact of facts.

The novel's occasional use of symbolism mostly has a religious dimension, in the context of the theodicy problem or in reference to the Passion narrative. The symbol of the cross has a particular significance here, both as a Leitmotif in Christianity, and in terms of the military connotations, in Germany, of the Iron Cross.

== Critical and public reception ==
In the 1950s, the critical reaction in West Germany to Payback was sharply negative. There were one or two more positive reactions from a handful of reviewers in the East German papers, as well as in one or two lower tier West German publications. At that time the dominant opinion formers in the world of German-language literature were writing for the leading newspapers, and these condemned the novel unanimously. As an example, Peter Hornung in Die Zeit criticised Ledig's prose style as "over-simplified to the point of desolation" Writing in the Frankfurter Allgemeine Zeitung, Wolfgang Schwerbrock found the novel "excessively emotional and declamatory"

Commentators were in particular affronted by the novel's numerous depictions of violence and death. In the Rheinischer Merkur E. R. Dallontano found Ledig's depiction of rape, and the shattering of a taboo that this represented, "distasteful and obnoxious" ("widerwärtig") and a "mainspring of the author's gruseomeness" ("Triebfeder seiner Gruselei“). Writing in the Kölner Stadt-Anzeiger, Rolf Becker's reaction was similarly hyperbolic: he complained that the novel would provide the reader with nothing but a "rapid succession of various horrors bathed in the deathly stench of naked sensation" Assertions of this nature left the critics' many readers to conclude that Gert Ledig had produced not a work of serious literary merit, but an old fashioned "Penny dreadful". The idea that the novel was a serious attempt at a literary reassessment of the Second World War gained hardly any traction. The novel was underpinned by an ugly and unvarnished presentation of total war, acknowledging no diminution of the industrial-scale brutality of modern war on the so-called home front. This presentation coincided with a sustained push by the West German political establishment towards national rehabilitation, involving rearmament and the country's recent (in 1955) admission to NATO. The implications of Ledig's work regarding the contentious issues surrounding West German rearmament and militarism more generally were not particularly welcome to the instinctively rather conservative class of literary critics then dominating the "national" press.

In 2003, nearly fifty years later, Marcel Reich-Ranicki, himself widely seen as the doyen of a younger generation of literary critics, provided his own assessment of the media rejection that had greeted Payback back in 1956:

At that time no one was interested in the war, in the war as a subject for a novel or a drama. That was Ledig's misfortune. And it was too bad, because one of the properties of his two important novels [Vergeltung and Die Stalinorgel] is the way that they do not spare the reader."

The book was republished in the Autumn/Fall of 1999 at the instigation of the influential literary critic/journalist Volker Hage. This followed a fundamental re-evaluation of post-war literature more generally that had become mainstream in the German speaking world, following a lecture given by Max Sebald in Zürich in 1997. By 1999 many attitudes had been completely reversed since the original publication of Payback, which now met with a much more positive critical reception. In Die Zeit Reinhard Baumgart expressly commended Ledig's "almost hammered out sentences" ("knapp gehämmerten Sätze") and the "breathlessness of the language" ("Atemlosigkeit der Sprache"). Stephan Reinhardt in Der Tagesspiegel attested to Ledig's "astonishingly dense realism". Peter Roos writing in the Frankfurter Allgemeine Zeitung was profoundly impressed by Ledig's „verzweifelte[r] Dokumentarliteratur“.

On 29 October 1999 Payback was featured on the influential television programme Das Literarische Quartett. The programme had an audience of several million viewers in the German speaking world at the time, and Ledig's book was featured alongside the German language version of the bestseller Atomised (Elementarteilchen/Les Particules Élémentaires) by Michel Houellebecq, which must have contributed substantially to the subsequent popularity of Payback. On 26 August 2005 an audio version of Payback, produced by Klaus Prangenberg, was broadcast by Radio Bremen.

== Editions ==
=== German language editions ===
- Vergeltung. S. Fischer, Frankfurt am Main, 1956. (Originalausgabe/Original edition)
- Vergeltung. Suhrkamp Verlag, Frankfurt am Main, 1999. (Zahlreiche Nachdrucke (numerous reprints) u.a. 2000, 2001, 2003, 2004.) ISBN 978-3518397411.

=== Audio editions (German language) ===
- Vergeltung: Hörspiel. Von Klaus Prangenberg (Regie) nach dem gleichnamigen Roman von Gert Ledig. Mit Nina Petri, Hannes Jaenicke, Stefan Aretz. Bremen: RB, 2004, 65 Min.

=== Translations ===
- Czech (Odplata, 1958)
- Dutch (Vergelding, 2000)
- French (Sous les bombes, 2003)
- English (Payback, 2003)
- Spanish (Represalia, 2006)
- Croat (Odmazda, 2008)
