= Doris Kilias =

German translator and Arabist (1942–2008)

Doris Kilias (née Galuhn, formerly Erpenbeck, 22 July 1942 – 1 June 2008) was a German Arabist and literary translator, best known as the German translator of Nobel Prize winner Naguib Mahfouz.

== Biography ==
Kilias grew up in post-war Bernau near Berlin in East Germany and attended Humboldt University of Berlin, where she studied Arabic and Romance studies under Rita Schober. After years of studying in Egypt, she received her doctorate from Karl Marx University (now Leipzig University) in 1974 and her habilitation from Humboldt University in 1984.

In addition to translating numerous novels by Naguib Mafouz, she also translated works by Gamal al-Ghitani, Abdelhamid ben Hadouga, Yusuf al-Qa'id, Miral al-Tahawy, Emily Nasrallah, Mohamed Choukri, Salwa Al Neimi, Rajaa al-Sanea, and others. In 1999, she received the Jane Scatcherd Prize for her "precise translations that provide insights into another culture". Whenever the language of her translations of Arabic authors was highlighted in reviews without their name being mentioned, she reacted with incomprehension: "They probably think he writes in German!"

Kilias was the mother of German writer Jenny Erpenbeck.
