= Gert Ledig =

German writer

Gert Ledig, full name Robert Gerhard Ledig (4 November 1921, Leipzig – 1 June 1999 in Landsberg am Lech), was a German writer.

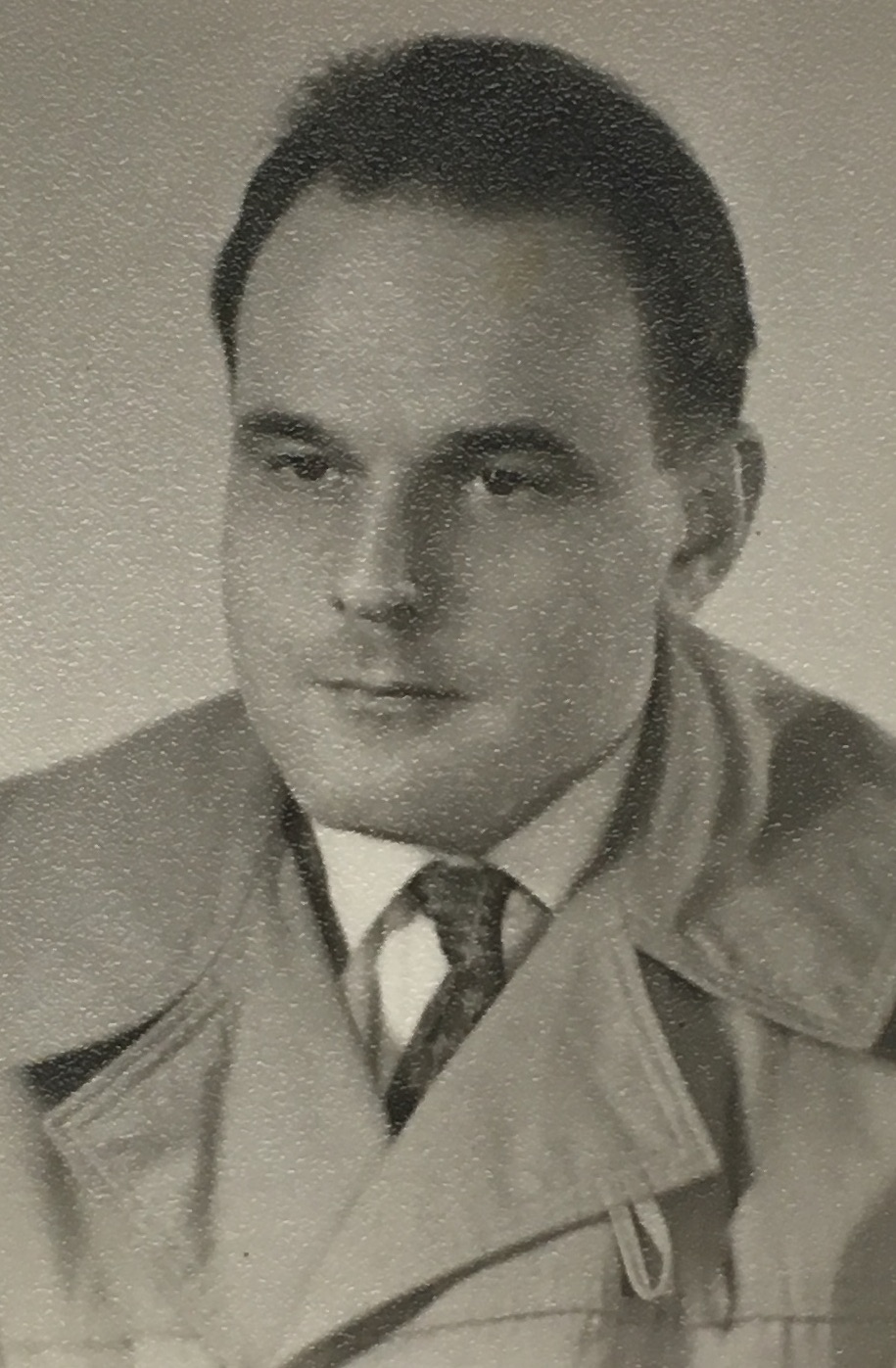
Gert Ledig

== Biography ==
Gert Ledig, son of a merchant, spent his early childhood in Vienna. From 1929 he lived in Leipzig. After finishing school, he held down a number of casual jobs from 1936 onwards. After this, he entered an apprenticeship to become an electrician and also studied at a private acting school to become a director. In 1939, he volunteered for the German army (Wehrmacht). As a pioneer, he took part in fighting at the Western Front, advanced to NCO and was transferred to the Eastern Front in 1941. Due to alleged misconduct he was transferred to a penal battalion. In summer 1942, Ledig was wounded before Leningrad; he suffered, among other injuries, an injury to his jaw. After being released from the army, he trained to become a shipbuilding engineer. In the last year of the war he worked in the naval forces bureaucracy.

After the end of the Second World War, Ledig joined Germany's Communist Party. He again worked several casual jobs, such as lumberjack and scaffolder. In 1948, he failed in his attempt to take over his father's company and also failed in setting up his own advertising agency. From 1951 to 1953, Ledig worked as a translator for the US Army, then worked as an author from 1953 onwards.

His debut novel The Stalin Organ (Die Stalinorgel) was relatively positively received both in Germany and abroad. Ledig was invited to meetings of Germany's literary author group Gruppe 47. Because of his war injuries and doubts whether he could call himself an author at all, he declined the invitation, stating he'd find it impossible to stand next to authors such as Ilse Aichinger, a member of the group, and The Stalin Organ was "only a combat organ". In 1956, he was represented by Günter Eich, who read from Ledig's second novel, Payback (Vergeltung). Ledig's stark depiction of war events was increasingly met with revulsion in the climate of the 1950s, so Ledig eventually withdrew from writing altogether.

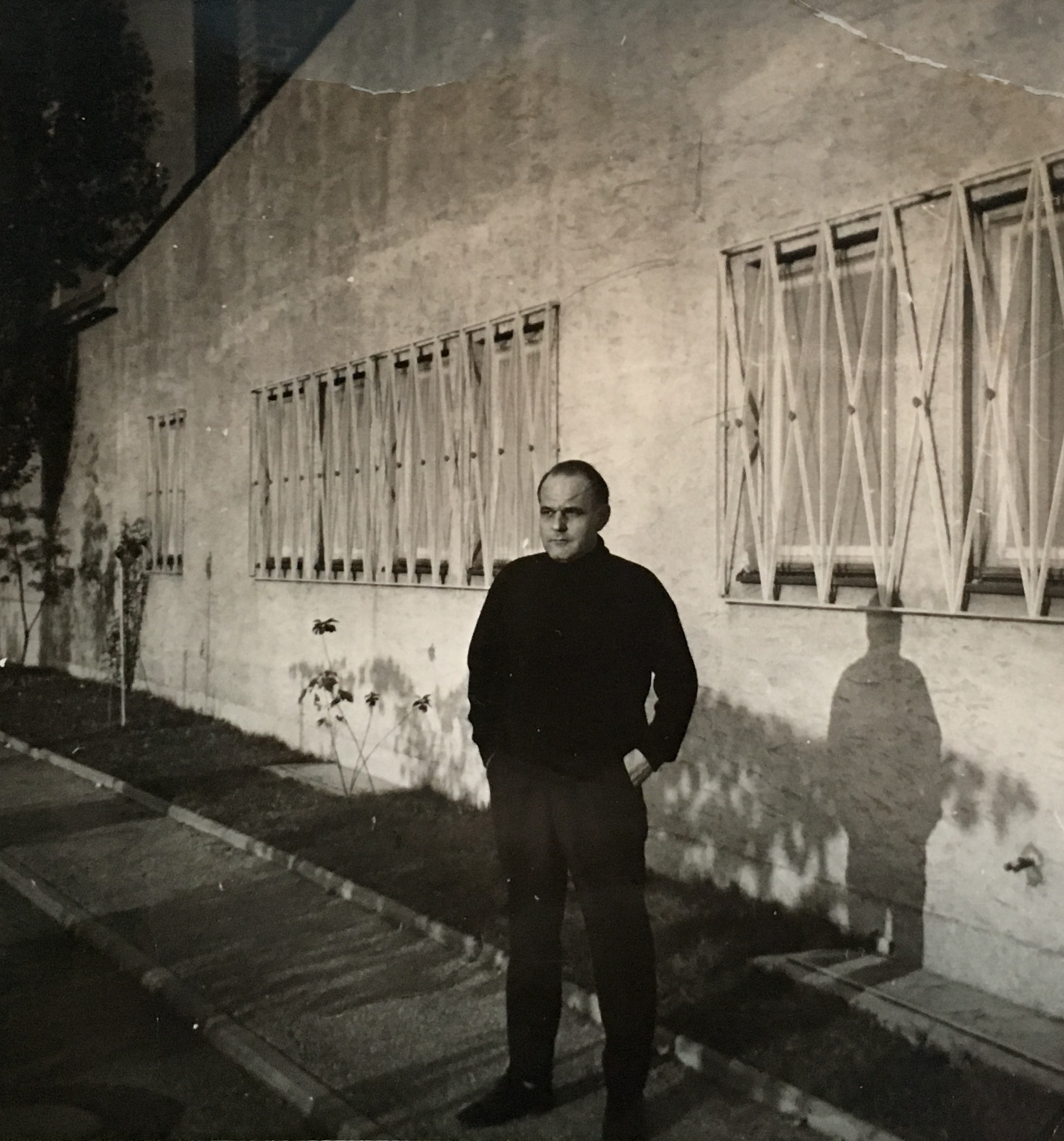
Gert Ledig, October 1963

From 1963 he ran an engineering firm and an agency for technology news.

Ledig, meanwhile living in isolation in Utting near the Ammersee, was only rediscovered in 1998 - just before his death. W. G. Sebald had been pointed towards his work Vergeltung as one of the few examples of a literary treatment of Allied air raids on Germany during the Second World War. Sebald published a chapter on the responses to his Zürcher Vorlesungen ("Zurich lectures") of 1997 and the resulting discussion in the Germany media in his book On the Natural History of Destruction ("Luftkrieg und Literatur") in 1999.

In autumn 1999, German publisher Suhrkamp re-issued Vergeltung, which met much more positive responses now than during its first publication in autumn 1956. In August 1999, the novel was discussed in the Literarisches Quartett, a TV-broadcast book discussion featuring prominent literature critics, discussed by Marcel Reich-Ranicki and thus gained recognition again. On 26 August 2005, radio station Radio Bremen broadcast a radio drama based on the novel with the same title. This version was written by Daniel Berger and directed by Klaus Prangenberg.

Since 2016 there is an official Facebook page on which is planned to publish yet unpublished or lost stories of the author. Current dates and events soon will be announced .

== Works ==
- Die Stalinorgel, 1955, Hamburg, Claassen Verlag
  - translated into English as The Naked Hill (1956, London, Weidenfeld & Nicolson) / The Tortured Earth (1956, Chicago, Henry Regnery)
  - new English translation The Stalin Organ (2004, London, Granta) / The Stalin Front (2005, New York, New York Review of Books)
  - also Dutch (publisher Arbeiderspers) and Portuguese (Ulissea) editions
- Vergeltung, 1956, Frankfurt am Main, S.Fischer
  - translated into English as Payback (2003, London, Granta)
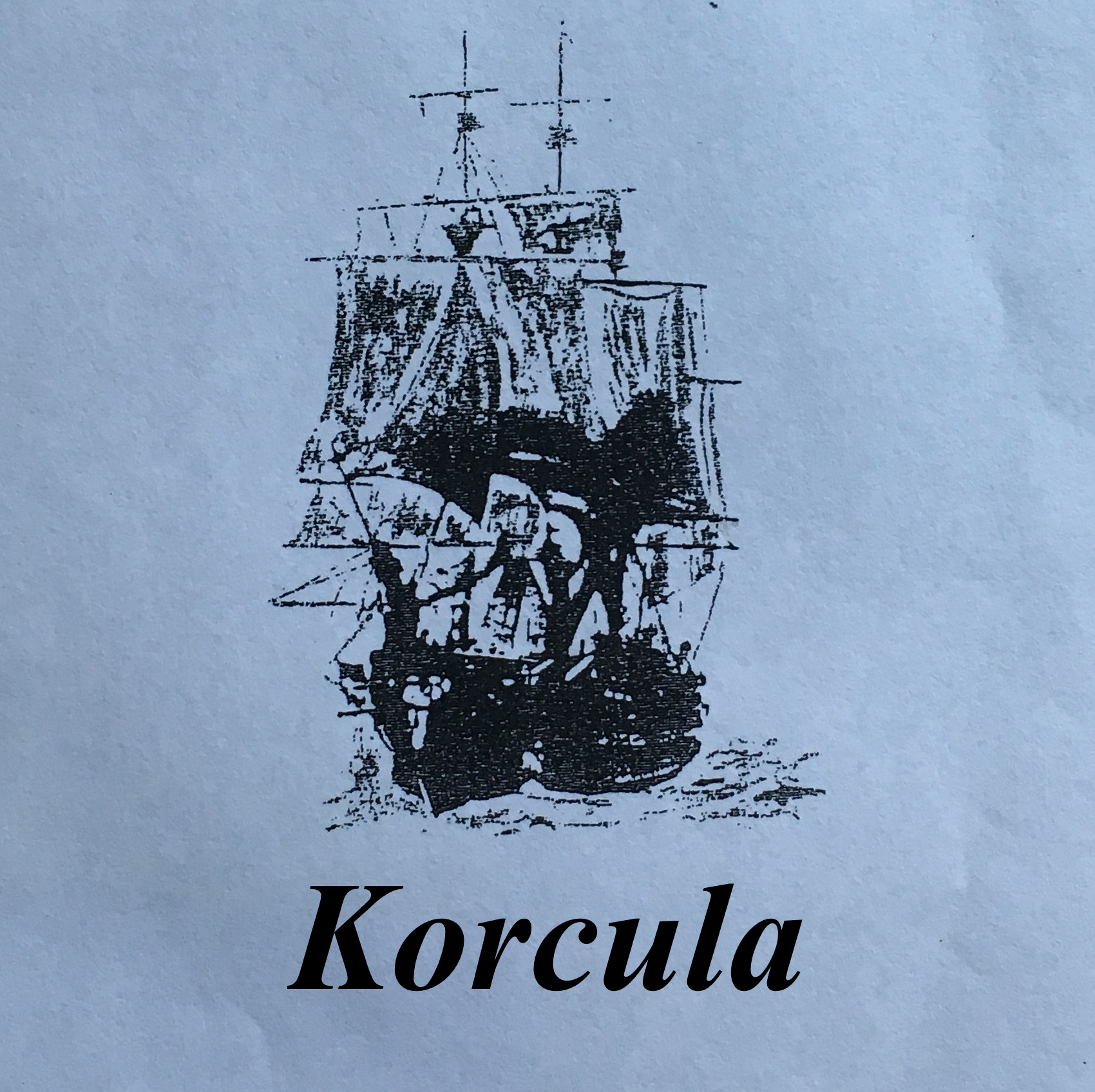
    Gert Ledig, Korcula
  - also Dutch (publisher Arbeiderspers), French (Zulma), Spanish (Minuscula) and Croatian (Kruzak) editions
- Faustrecht, 1957, Munich, Kurt Desch
  - translated into English as The Brutal Years (1959, London, Weidenfeld & Nicolson)
  - Kindle Edition Amazon "Faustrecht, Gert Ledig", Published 2015
- Darling, München [ua] (translated into English) 1957
- Das Duell (The Duel), 1958, Berlin, Aufbau Verlag
- Der Staatsanwalt (The Prosecutor), 1958, Fürstenfeldbruck, Steinklopfer
- Die Kanonen von Korcula (The Guns of Korcula) (as yet unpublished novel manuscript, probably from the 1960s)

== Theater adaptation ==
- Faustrecht based on the book by Gert Ledig, for the stage worked by Barbara Wendland. Premiere at February 2016 in Theater im Pfalzbau, Ludwigshafen. Coproduction with the Badischen Staatstheater Karlsruhe. Regie: Tilman Gersch.
