= List of fictional islands =

Below is a list of islands created for films, literature, television, or other media.

== A ==
- The Abarat: Twenty-five islands in an archipelago, one for each hour and one for all the hours, from the series The Books of Abarat by Clive Barker
- Absolom: A prison island in the film Escape from Absolom
- Acidophilus: An island in Greece in the adventure game Spy Fox in "Dry Cereal"
- Aepyornis Island: An atoll near Madagascar, in H. G. Wells' story of the same name
- Al Amarja: Mediterranean island state in the Over the Edge roleplaying game
- Alabasta: An island inspired by Egypt in the One Piece manga series
- Alca/Penguin Island: An island off the northern shore of Europe, where penguins were transformed into humans, a satirical analogue of France, in the 1908 novel L'île des Pingouins by Anatole France
- Alderney: An island and borough based on northeastern New Jersey in Grand Theft Auto IV
- Algonquin: An island and borough based on Manhattan, New York City, in Grand Theft Auto IV
- Alola: The archipelago where the video games Pokémon Sun and Moon and Pokémon Ultra Sun and Ultra Moon are set, consisting of Melemele Island, Akala Island, Ula'ula Island, Poni Island, and the artificial island Aether Paradise.
- Altis: A fictional Mediterranean island in the 2013 video game ARMA 3
- Altruria: From the novel A Traveler from Altruria by William Dean Howells
- Amity Island: From the book and film Jaws
- Angel Island: The home of Knuckles the Echidna in the Sonic the Hedgehog video game series
- Angel Island: An island in the Pacific Ocean in Inez Haynes Gillmore's novel of the same name
- Antonio Island: An island in the coast of Oregon, the main setting of the film The Fog
- Ape Atoll: From RuneScape
- Ape Island: From The Simpsons
- Apollo: From the video game Fortnite: Battle Royale, the main setting for the second chapter of the game
- Arakko: A sentient island in the Marvel Comics universe that is the sister island of Krakoa.
- Armorel: Part of the Channel Islands, the setting for the film Appointment with Venus
- Asunción: A small island republic in Maryse Condé's novel The Gospel According to the New World, said to be south of Brazil and close to the Brazilian city of Recife.
- Astigos Island: An independence-seeking territory of the fictional Mediterranean coastal nation of Lukano from the game Time Crisis 3
- Athena: From the video game Fortnite: Battle Royale, the main setting for the first chapter of the game
- Atlantis: From Plato's dialogues
- Atoll K: from Laurel and Hardy's last film
- Ahtohallan: A mystical glacial island in the Arctic from Frozen II
- Atuan: Island in Ursula K. Le Guin's Earthsea books
- August Bank Holiday Island: A fictional Commonwealth nation featured in The Goodies, found 'between Easter Island and Christmas Island'. In the Commonwealth Games, August Bank Holiday Island won and took over the Commonwealth Nations.
- Auk Modu: The main setting of Lost Island Theme Park.
- Avalon: From Arthurian legend, also the home of Oberon in Disney's Gargoyles animated series
- Avra: The smallest of the three Lone Islands in The Chronicles of Narnia series, home of Duke Bern
- Azkaban: Island prison in the Harry Potter series

== B ==
- Back Cup: A fictional island in the Bermuda, hideout of the pirate Ker Karraje in Jules Verne's novel Facing the Flag
- Bali Ha'i: A mysterious island in South Pacific and Tales of the South Pacific
- Balamb Island: from Final Fantasy VIII
- Banoi: The tropical setting of Dead Island, located near Papua New Guinea
- Battle Frontier: From Pokémon Emerald
- Beer Island: A mythical land where Linux power management works reliably
- Beep Island: A fictional island from preschool children's television series The Beeps
- Berk: From the book series How to Train Your Dragon and DreamWorks franchise of the same name
- Big Surf Island: An island in Burnout Paradise that has bigger jumps
- Birdwell Island: A fictional island from Clifford the Big Red Dog, inspired by Martha's Vineyard and named after the author of the books, Norman Bridwell.
- Benne Seed Island: An island off the coast of South Carolina near Charleston, where Polly O'Keefe and her family live in several novels by Madeleine L'Engle
- Bensalem: From New Atlantis by Francis Bacon
- Besaid: From Final Fantasy X and Final Fantasy X-2
- Bikanel: From Final Fantasy X and Final Fantasy X-2
- Binghuo Island (literally Ice and Fire Island): From the wuxia novel The Heavenly Sword and the Dragon Saber by Jin Yong
- The Black Island: From The Adventures of Tintin by Hergé
- Blackhawk Island: Secret base of the Blackhawks during World War II and beyond
- Island of the Blue Dolphins: Based on San Nicolas Island from the book by Scott O'Dell
- Blefuscu: From the novel Gulliver's Travels by Jonathan Swift
- Bohan: An island and borough based on The Bronx, New York City, in Grand Theft Auto IV
- Boonsey: A Channel Island in the film The Navy Lark
- Booty Island: A pirate island in the Caribbean in the game Monkey Island 2: LeChuck's Revenge, part of the Tri-Island area and governed by Elaine Marley
- Borgabunda: A Southern Pacific island featured in McHale's Navy and home to a Japanese sub base
- Brancrug Isle: A tidal island off the southeastern coast of Cornwall, where the game Book of Hours is set
- Britannula: Setting of the novel The Fixed Period by Anthony Trollope
- Broker: An island and borough based on Brooklyn, New York City, in Grand Theft Auto IV
- Buyan: From the Russian folklore Tale of Tsar Saltan by Alexander Pushkin

== C ==
- C Island: From the Nintendo game StarTropics
- Cactuar Island: From Final Fantasy VII and Final Fantasy VIII
- Camp Wawanakwa: From the Total Drama series, particularly Total Drama Island, Total Drama Revenge of the Island, Total Drama All-Stars, and the revival
- Candy Apple Island: From The Simpsons
- Candied Island: From The Marvelous Misadventures of Flapjack, an island that Flapjack and Captain K'nuckles search for
- Caprona: Also known as Caspak, from The Land That Time Forgot and its sequels
- Carlotta: Small island off the coast of Peru in the film The Bribe, reused to comic effect in Dead Men Don't Wear Plaid
- Casanga: Island on the west coast of Africa in the 1936 film Song of Freedom
- Caspiar: A fictional island nation and home of Andy Kaufman's character Latka.
- Cascara: Main setting of the film Water
- Castaway Island: Home of the castaways in Pirate Islands
- Cayo Perico: Private island in the Caribbean Sea owned by the Colombian narco-trafficker Juan "El Rubio" Strickler in Grand Theft Auto Online. Based on Norman's Cay and Canouan.
- Chausible Island: From the novel The New Paul and Virginia
- Chicken Island: An island that appeared in the Fetch! with Ruff Ruffman spin-off Ruff Ruffman: Humble Media Genius
- Cinnabar Island: Site of the seventh Gym in the game Pokémon Red, Blue, and Yellow and its various remakes
- Clanbronwyn: A small island off the coast of Anglesey in the adventure game Trilby's Notes
- Club Penguin: The titular setting of the game Club Penguin
- Cobra Island: Small island in the Gulf of Mexico. Sovereign nation of Cobra from G.I Joe comics.
- Comona Islands: A tropical island chain in the Eusian Ocean. They are home to a university, observatory, space center, and military airport. Featured in several games in the Ace Combat series.
- Coral Island: From the boy's book by R. M. Ballantyne
- Coral Island: From the animated series The Smoggies
- Corto Maltese: From Batman: The Dark Knight Returns comics
- Corona: Small island of the Kingdom of Corona from Tangled
- Costa Estralita: From the film Princess Protection Program
- Crab Island: Caribbean island shaped like a crab, under the domination of Crocodile Island, in the Patrouille des Castors comics
- Crab Island: An island in the Caribbean Sea, from the children's novel Peter Duck by Arthur Ransome
- Crab Key: Dr. No's hideout in the first James Bond film
- Craggy Island: Setting of sitcom Father Ted, located off the coast of Ireland
- Cranc Island: West of north Africa, also called Fortnight Island, where McLeod pulled a ship's cannon up the cliff to destroy the enemy galley in The Hundred Days
- Crescent Island: A crescent-shaped island in the video game Final Fantasy IV
- Crocodile Island: A Caribbean island shaped like a crocodile, with a dictatorial government which seems to be heavily influenced by Tahiti, in the La Patrouille des Castors comics
- Crocodile Isle: Home of the Kremlings in the Donkey Kong series.
- Crusoeland: Another name for Atoll K
- Centaur Island: Xanth novels by Piers Anthony

== D ==
- Danger Island: The setting of an adventure series on The Banana Splits Adventure Hour
- Daonan Islands: A series of islands from the Ace Combat series powered by a large antenna transmitting energy from the International Space Elevator
- Dazhi Island: From the novel The Return of the Condor Heroes by Jin Yong
- Death Queen Island: From Saint Seiya
- Deist: From Final Fantasy II
- Demonreach: From The Dresden Files, the name Harry Dresden gave to an island in Lake Michigan.
- Destiny Islands: The home world of Sora and Riku in the Kingdom Hearts series
- Devon Island: From James A. Michener's novel Chesapeake
- Dinosaur Island: An uncharted island in the DC Comics universe that is inhabited by dinosaurs
- Dinotopia: From the eponymous book
- Dolphin Island: In the novel by Arthur C. Clarke, located off the coast of Australia
- Donkey Kong Island: From the video game series Donkey Kong
- Doorn: The largest of the three Lone Islands in The Chronicles of Narnia series, and the location of the archipelago's capital, Narrowhaven
- Dr. Franklin's Island: From the book of the same name
- Dragon Roost Island: From the GameCube game The Legend of Zelda: The Wind Waker
- Dragon, Tiger and Turtle Islands: In the children's novel Missee Lee by Arthur Ransome
- Dressrosa: An island in the New World in the One Piece manga series
- Dream Island: A luxurious island within Battle for Dream Island.
- Dukes: An island and borough based on Queens, New York City, in Grand Theft Auto IV

== E ==
- Edwards Island: Setting of the game Oxenfree
- Egret Island: From the novel The Mermaid Chair
- The El Nido Archipelago: Setting of the game Chrono Cross
- Ember Island: From Avatar: The Last Airbender
- Erangel: A fictional abandoned island that is located in the Black Sea near Russia in the 2017 battle royale game PlayerUnknown's Battlegrounds
- Eroda: A fictional island from Harry Styles' music video for "Adore You"
- Estard: The only landmass remaining in the present world of Dragon Quest VII
- Estillyen: From the books by William E. Jefferson
- Eureka: From the film Eureka
- Executive Bathroom Island: From the Family Guy episode "Tales of a Third Grade Nothing"
- Eye Land: A small lake island in Fortnite: Battle Royale
- Eventide Island: From the video game The Legend of Zelda: Breath of the Wild

== F ==
- Fantasy Island: From the eponymous television series
- Fearing Island: Island site of rocket base in the Tom Swift, Jr. novels
- Felimath: The second largest of the three Lone Islands in The Chronicles of Narnia series
- Fernandos: The destination for matched couples on Take Me Out
- Fibber Island: A made-up island in a song by They Might Be Giants
- Finnigan Island: The island where John Patterson and one of his friends washed up on during a big storm in the 1999 cartoon For Better or For Worse
- Flicky Island: The main setting of Sonic 3D Blast, home of the dimension-traveling Flickies
- Floptropica: A fictional country made by TikTok users, based on the internet meme "Floptok."
- Flyspeck Island: From Curtis
- Isle of Fogg: The only one of the twenty-three Outcropp Islands off the west coast of Scotland to be inhabited. It appears in San Sombrèro: A Land of Carnivals, Cocktails and Coups.
- Forsaken Fortress: An island in the GameCube game, The Legend of Zelda: The Wind Waker
- Fort Grays Island: An island off the southeastern coast of Usea, functioning as a key joint operations site with an air base and sea port. Featured in several games in the Ace Combat series.
- Fraxos: A fictional island in The Magus, a novel written by John Fowles
- Fur Step Island: A fictional island in the Nintendo Switch game, Super Mario 3D World + Bowser's Fury

== G ==
- Gaea: An island off the coast of Portugal in the novel The Arm of the Starfish by Madeleine L'Engle, named for the Greek goddess Gaea
- Gaea's Navel: An island in the video game Chrono Cross
- Galaxy Island: From Our Man Flint
- Galuga Island: Setting of the video games Contra, Contra: Shattered Soldier, and Contra 4
- Ganae: A Caribbean island in the novel No Other Life by Brian Moore
- Genosha: An island nation in the Marvel Comics universe that is primarily inhabited by mutants
- Gengoro Island: From Dr. Slump
- Gilligan's Island: From the eponymous TV series
- Ginger Island: An island from the video game Stardew Valley
- Goblin Island: Island settled by goblins in the songs of melodic death metal band Nekrogoblikon
- Gont: Island in Ursula K. Le Guin's Earthsea books
- Goon Island: From Goonland, a Popeye the Sailor cartoon. Popeye rescues his Pappy, who is being held prisoner by the Goons on the island.
- Goose Island: Island in Oregon in the film WarGames, home of Dr. Stephen Falken
- Grand Nixon Island: From Marvel Comics
- Gravett Island: The destination of escape pods from the USS Enterprise-E starship in the film Star Trek: First Contact
- Great Bear Island: The main setting and playable map in the survival video game The Long Dark.
- Great Todday (Todaidh Mór): Island in the Hebrides, companion of Little Todday in the novel Whisky Galore by Compton Mackenzie
- Greatfish Isle: An island in the GameCube game, The Legend of Zelda: The Wind Waker
- Griffin Rock: The primary setting of the Transformers: Rescue Bots television series.
- Gristol: The setting for the video game Dishonored
- Guarma: The setting for the fifth chapter of Red Dead Redemption 2 game, an island located east of Cuba
- Gullah Gullah Island: The titular setting of the TV series of the same name

== H ==
- Haleakaloha: Island in French Polynesia in the film Donovan's Reef
- Harper's Island: Setting of the CBS horror/mystery series Harper's Island
- Haunted Isle: Setting of the Scooby-Doo, Where Are You! episode "Hassle in the Castle"
- Havnor: Island in Ursula K. Le Guin's Earthsea books
- Hedeby: Island in The Girl with the Dragon Tattoo book by Stieg Larsson, where Harriet Vanger disappeared
- Henders Island: Island in Fragment book by Warren Fahy.
- Hili-li Island: An inhabited island near the South Pole in the novel A Strange Discovery by Charles Romeyn Dake. It is south of Tsalal.
- Hi-yi-yi: A fictional island where the Rhinogradentia live
- Hoenn: An archipelago where Pokémon Ruby, Sapphire, and Emerald and their remakes take place
- Hollowrock Island: An island off the coast of Löckelle in the 2022 video game Teardown
- Hope Island: From Captain Planet and the Planeteers
- Horai Island: A Chinese-owned artificial island used to generate hydroelectric power in the anime series Code Geass: Lelouch of the Rebellion, which later becomes the home base of the Black Knights
- Huella Islands: Footprint-shaped islands off the coast of Cayenne, mentioned in the Hardy Boys books. They are ruled by dictator Juan Posada, with their "spy chief" being Bedoya.
- Hy Brazil: A mythical island and the inspiration for Margaret Elphinstone's 2002 novel of the same name
- Hydra Island: The second smaller island off the coast of the main one in Lost

== I ==
- Indian Island: From Agathe Christie's novel And Then There Were None
- Infant Island: The homeland of Mothra
- Island Closest to Heaven: From the Square Enix video game Final Fantasy VIII
- Island Closest to Hell: from the Square Enix video game Final Fantasy VIII
- The Island of Dr. Moreau: The titular setting of the novel by H. G. Wells
- The Island of Time: From the video game Prince of Persia: Warrior Within
- Isla Cruces: The island where Davy Jones' heart was kept in Pirates of the Caribbean: Dead Man's Chest.
- Isla de Corales: An island resort in the Diary of a Wimpy Kid series
- Isla de Muerta: The island where Hector Barbossa and his crew found gold in Pirates of the Caribbean: The Curse of the Black Pearl
- Isla Los Organos: The location of the gene therapy clinic in Die Another Day, where Bond finds Zao
- Island of Domination: Subject of a Judas Priest song from their album Sad Wings of Destiny
- The Island: Setting of the TV series Lost
- Island of Misfit Toys: From the 1964 stop-motion animated TV special Rudolph the Red-Nosed Reindeer
- Island of Misfit Mascots: From the South Park episode "Sexual Harassment Panda"
- Isla Nublar: Site of InGen's Jurassic Park
- Isla Presidencial: An adult web animation from Venezuela
- Isla Sorna: Site of InGen's "Site B" in The Lost World and Jurassic Park III
- Isle Delfino: Setting of Super Mario Sunshine
- Isle de Gambino: An island town from the online community Gaia Online
- Isle Esme: A series of islands from Breaking Dawn by Stephenie Meyer
- Isle o' Smiles: A seemingly paradisiac island from the video game Dragon Quest VI
- Isle of Armor: The titular setting of The Isle of Armor DLC in the Pokémon Sword and Shield Expansion Pass
- Isle of the Damned: An island from the video game Chrono Cross
- Isle of the Storm: A small lake island in Fortnite: Battle Royale
- Isle of Perpetual Tickling: An island from the Veggietales episode "Esther, the Girl Who Became Queen"
- Itchy Island: From the animated series Camp Lazlo
- Izayoi Island: From the Japanese anime TV series Stitch!, based on the Disney animated film Lilo & Stitch
- Isle of View: From the Xanth novels by Piers Anthony
- Isle of Illusion: From the Xanth novels by Piers Anthony

== J ==
- Jabberwock Island: A fictional island from the Danganronpa series
- Jambalaya Island: An ex-pirate island in the Caribbean, turned into a tourist attraction center, in the game Escape from Monkey Island
- Japari Park: A massive open zoo from the Kemono Friends multimedia franchise, consisting of multiple islands such as Kyoshu, Riukiu, and Hokkai.
- Jarnesia Island: A fictional island from the French/Canadian animated television series Totally Spies!
- Javasu: Am island in the Indian Ocean, the alleged country of Princess Caraboo
- Jean Bonney Island: In the Bay of Bengal, scene of Biggles and the Deep Blue Sea (1967)
- Jinsy: In the BBC TV series This is Jinsy
- Jorvik: The setting of the Starshine Legacy series, Star Academy, Star Stable and Star Stable Online

== K ==
- Ka-Choo: From the 1904 comedic opera The Sho-Gun, by George Ade and Gustav Luders. A part of Korea, located in the Sea of Japan and lorded over by a ruler known as the Sho-Gun.
- Kaigoon: From Road to Singapore
- Kalokairi: From Mamma Mia!
- Kalimdor: From the video game World of Warcraft
- Kame House: From the anime Dragon Ball
- Karamja: From RuneScape
- Katorga-12: Island housing an abandoned top-secret Soviet research facility off the Siberian coast from Singularity
- Kawawii Island: From the video game Go Vacation
- Keelhaul Key: From the video game Paper Mario: The Thousand-Year Door
- Khesed Island: A large Emmerian island in western Anea from Ace Combat 6: Fires of Liberation
- Kilika: From Final Fantasy X and Final Fantasy X-2
- Kiloran: A Scottish island near Oban in the 1945 film I Know Where I'm Going! based on the island of Colonsay
- Kinakuta: Island state in Southeast Asia of Neal Stephenson's novel Cryptonomicon.
- King's Head Island: An island in the television series Bob's Burgers
- Kinkow: A supernatural island in the Disney XD television series Pair of Kings
- Kirrin Island: In The Famous Five children's books by Enid Blyton
- Kitchen Island: From the Wario Land series
- Koholint Island: From the video game The Legend of Zelda: Link's Awakening
- Koo Koo Island: An island in the West Indies mentioned in Carry On at Your Convenience
- Krakoa: A sentient island from Marvel Comics. Initially an enemy of the X-Men, Krakoa later becomes their ally and has a mutant nation established on its lands.
- Krawk Island: An island in Neopia
- Kuaki: A southern Pacific island from McHale's Navy where Lieutenant Gloria Winters and Quartermaster George 'Christy' Christopher get married
- Kyoshi Island: From Avatar: The Last Airbender

== L ==
- Lairdman Island: Located in New York City, the location of the Foot Clan's headquarters in the Teenage Mutant Ninja Turtles films. It is named for the franchise's creators, Kevin Eastman and Peter Laird.
- Lapak: From the novel Alaska by James A. Michener
- Laputa: Flying island from Gulliver's Travels by Jonathan Swift and the film Castle in the Sky by Hayao Miyazaki
- La Tolqa: From the film Infinity Pool by Brandon Cronenberg
- Lavalava Island: From the video game Paper Mario
- Lea Monde: From the video game Vagrant Story
- Leap Islands: From The Monikins by James Fenimore Cooper
- LEGO Island: From the video games LEGO Island, LEGO Island 2: The Brickster's Revenge and Island Xtreme Stunts.
- Leshp: From Discworld series by Terry Pratchett
- Lian Yu: An island in the TV series Arrow
- L'île aux Enfants: From the French TV show L'île aux Enfants
- Lilliput: From the novel Gulliver's Travels by Jonathan Swift
- Lincoln Island: From Jules Verne's novel The Mysterious Island
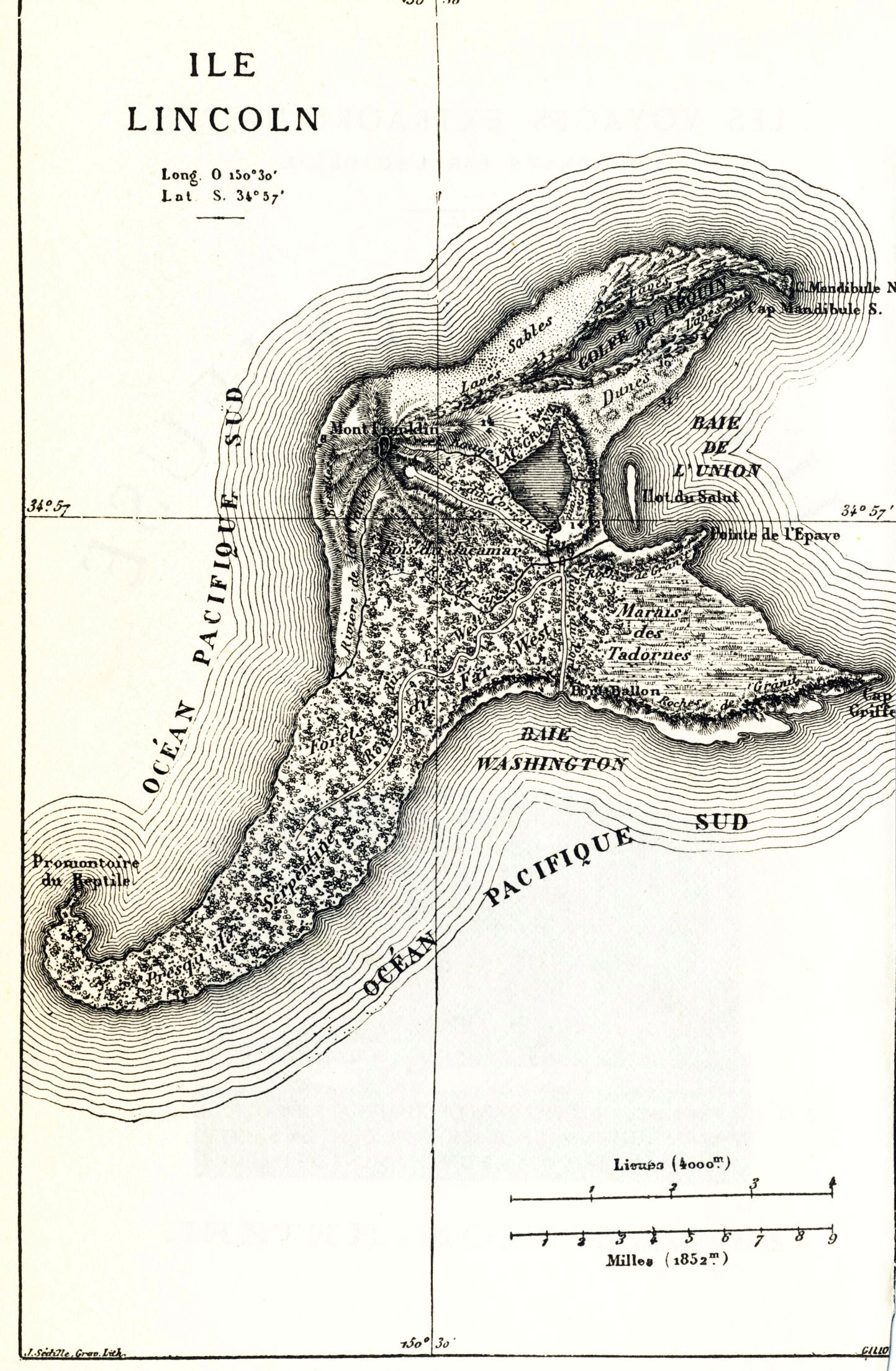
  Map of "Lincoln Island" from The Mysterious Island.
- Lingshe Island: In the novel The Heavenly Sword and the Dragon Saber by Jin Yong
- Little Todday (Todaidh Beag): An island in the Hebrides, companion of Great Todday in the novel Whisky Galore by Compton Mackenzie
- Little Tall Island: An island in the coasts of Maine, the setting of Dolores Claiborne by Stephen King
- Living Island: Main setting of H.R. Pufnstuf
- Love Island: The setting for a reality TV show of the same name
- Lucre Island: A pirate island in the game Escape from Monkey Island
- Lutari Island: An island in Neopia

== M ==
- Macross Island: A south Pacific island from the anime series The Super Dimension Fortress Macross and the American version Robotech
- Madripoor: A lawless island nation near Singapore that is featured in Marvel Comics and the TV miniseries The Falcon and the Winter Soldier
- Mako Island: A Pacific island off Australia from the television series H_{2}O: Just Add Water
- Mallet Island: From the video game Devil May Cry
- Maple Island: An island from the video game MapleStory, where beginners start and train before leaving for Victoria Island
- Mardi archipelago: From Herman Melville's Mardi and a Voyage Thither
- Mata Nui: From Bionicle
- Matool: A Caribbean island from the film Zombi 2, said to be in the Antilles, where a zombie outbreak begins that eventually makes its way to New York City
- McHale Island: An island appropriated for the use of the crew of PT-73 in the 1960s sitcom McHale's Navy, named after the PT boat's skipper, LtCmdr. Quinton McHale
- Medici: Setting of the video game Just Cause 3
- Melaswen: An island from Days of Our Lives
- Mêlée Island: A pirate island in the Caribbean in the Monkey Island games, part of the Tri-Island area and governed by Elaine Marley
- Membata: The island on Lost that the Oceanic 6 claim to have crashed on
- Milf Island: The location of a fictional reality show in which a lone pubescent boy lives on an island with many amorous mature women
- Misty Isles: Home of Princess, later Queen, Aleta in Prince Valiant comics
- Moahu: Island in the Pacific in Patrick O'Brian's novels The Wine-Dark Sea and The Truelove
- Moesko Island: Island from The Ring by Gore Verbinski
- Mono Island: Home of the God of Evolution from the Discworld series by Terry Pratchett
- Monster Isle: From the 2016 reboot of The Powerpuff Girls
- Morabunda: Ubcharted Pacific island from McHale's Navy
- Morrowland: A tiny kingdom with five inhabitants and a railway from Michael Ende's children's novel Jim Button and Luke the Engine Driver
- Mui: A remote island nation off the coast of Vietnam in Yun Ko-eun's novel The Disaster Tourist
- Muir Island: An island in the Marvel Comics universe that Moira MacTaggert conducts research in.
- Mypos: Greek island and the homeland of Balki Bartokomous in Perfect Strangers
- Myst: From the adventure computer game Myst
- The Mysterious Island of Mystery: From the video game Kingdom of Loathing
- Mystery Island: An island in the video game Neopets

== N ==
- Isle of Naboombu: Kingdom of anthropomorphic animals in the Disney film Bedknobs and Broomsticks
- Nato'wa: Fictional Arctic Ocean Island inhabited by Native American One against a Wilderness (novel)
- Navarone: Fictional Greek island housing a German heavy gun battery in The Guns of Navarone novel and the film based on it
- Nepenthe: In the 1917 novel South Wind, located off the coast of Italy in the Tyrrhenian Sea; a thinly fictionalized Capri
- Neri's Island: Neri's home in Ocean Girl
- Neverland: An island from Peter Pan and related media
- New America: An island northwest of Greenland in The Adventures of Captain Hatteras by Jules Verne
- New Island: An unfinished country from the 2009 video game Little King's Story
- Nibelia: A Mediterranean-based island nation in Seek and Destroy
- Nim's Island: An island from the film of the same name
- N. Sanity Island: The home of Crash Bandicoot in the video game series of the same name
- Nollop: An island off the coast of South Carolina in Ella Minnow Pea (2001) by Mark Dunn
- Nomanisan Island: From The Incredibles
- Nontoonyt Island: From the adventure computer game Leisure Suit Larry Goes Looking for Love (in Several Wrong Places)
- North Pole: An island nation in the Arctic Ocean and part of the United Nations, governed by Santa Claus
- Northstar Islands: The main setting of Sonic Superstars
- Nowhere Island: In And Then There Were None by Agatha Christie; in later editions, the name was changed to "Indian Island" or "Soldier Island"
- Nowhere Islands: Setting of Mother 3
- Null Island: Located in the Gulf of Guinea
- Númenor: Home of the Dúnedain before their downfall in J. R. R. Tolkien's Legendarium

== O ==
- Odo Island: A Pacific island in Godzilla (1954) and Godzilla Minus One (2023) where Godzilla initially emerges
- Okishima Island: From the novel Battle Royale by Koushun Takami and the film Battle Royale by Kinji Fukasaku
- Olympus: An artificial island nation, run by genetic modified humans and advanced technology, Appleseed manga
- Oni Island: A moving demonic island in Ōkami
- Ooo: The main island of the television series Adventure Time
- Orange Islands: An extensive island chain consisting of various active islands in the Pokémon anime
- Outset Island: The home of Link in the GameCube game The Legend of Zelda: The Wind Waker
- Oxbay: A small colony island in Pirates of the Caribbean video game
- Outcast Island: In Dragon Riders of Berk

== P ==
- Pahkitew Island: From the animated TV series Total Drama
- Pala: Island utopia in Aldous Huxley's Island
- Palanai: An island neighboring Banoi, which is near Papua New Guinea, and the setting of Dead Island: Riptide.
- Palpagos Islands: The main setting in which Palworld takes place.
- Panau: From Just Cause 2
- Pangabula Island: An island in the children's television show Jay Jay the Jet Plane
- Pantala: a continent in the book series Wings of Fire by Tui T. Sutherland
- Papuwa Island: From Papuwa
- Paradis: An island from the Attack on Titan manga and anime series, where most of the story takes place. The island is modeled after Madagascar.
- Paradise Island (later known as Themyscira): The home of Wonder Woman and other Amazons in the DC Comics universe
- Parrot Island: From The Suite Life on Deck
- Pescespada Island: From the film The Life Aquatic with Steve Zissou
- Phatt Island: An island in the Caribbean in the game Monkey Island 2: LeChuck's Revenge
- Pharmaul: A large island five hundred miles off the southwest coast of Africa in The Tribe That Lost Its Head and Richer Than All His Tribe by Nicholas Monsarrat
- Phraxos: A Greek island and the setting for most of John Fowles' postmodern novel, The Magus. It is based on the real Greek island of Spetses
- Piggy Island: An island where the characters from the Angry Birds franchise reside.
- Ping Islands: From the film The Life Aquatic with Steve Zissou
- Pi'illo Island: From the fourth installment of the Mario and Luigi RPG series, Mario and Luigi Dream Team
- Plunder Island: A pirate island in the Caribbean in the game The Curse of Monkey Island, part of the Tri-Island area (governed by Elaine Marley)
- Pokoponesia: Island nation from the animated series The Tick
- Pom Pom Galli: An uninhabited island or atoll from the film The Sea Chase
- Pondelayo: Island featured in Joan Lindsay's Through Darkest Pondelayo, a novel she wrote under the pseudonym Serena Livingstone-Stanley
- Poodle Island: Island prison from Fetch! with Ruff Ruffman
- Prawn Island: From Grand Theft Auto: Vice City and Grand Theft Auto: Vice City Stories
- Prison Island: A high security military base operated by the Guardian Units of Nations, first featured in Sonic Adventure 2
- Proasis Island: A fictional island from the French/Canadian animated television series Totally Spies!
- Punk Hazard: An island in the New World in the One Piece series
- Pyrrhia: A continent in the book series Wings of Fire by Tui T. Sutherland

== Q ==
- Qwghlm: A pair of British islands in the novels of Neal Stephenson

== R ==
- Ramita de la Baya: "Twig in the Bay", a small island dividing the United States and Mexico in Red Dead Redemption
- Rastepappe: Pacific island inhabited by koalas and badgers in the children's book and TV series Archibald the Koala
- Riten Kyo: From the video game Samurai Shodown Warrior's Rage 2
- Riven: From the adventure computer game Riven
- R'lyeh: Home of Cthulhu in H. P. Lovecraft's fiction
- Robloxia: The United States of America from Roblox
- Rockfort Island: From the video game Resident Evil – Code: Veronica
- Roke Island: The island where the wizard school in the Earthsea trilogy, by Ursula K. Le Guin, is based
- Rokovoko: From the Herman Melville novel Moby-Dick and home of Queequeg
- Rokkenjima: from the visual novel Umineko no Naku Koro Ni
- Roo Island: An island in Neopia
- Rook Islands: The setting of the video game Far Cry 3; a small island cluster located between Thailand and New Guinea
- Round Island: From the video game Final Fantasy VII
- Rugged Island: From the sitcom Father Ted, next door to Craggy Island

== S ==
- The Sabaody Archipelago: From the One Piece manga series
- Sahrani: A fictional island in the 2006 video game, ArmA: Armed Assault
- Saint Caro: A fictional Caribbean island featured in Albert H. Z. Carr's novel Finding Maubee
- Saint Eustace Island: A fictional island off the coast of Collinsport, Maine in the television series Dark Shadows
- Saint George's Island: A fictional island in Yes Prime Minister
- Saint Honoré: A fictional Caribbean island featured in Agatha Christie's novel A Caribbean Mystery
- Saint Marie: A fictional Caribbean island featured in Death in Paradise. It is implied that the island is either a British protectorate or a Crown Colony
- San Esperito: An island nation from Just Cause
- San Isabel: A small island republic near Brazil in Maryse Condé's novel The Gospel According to the New World, that "belonged to three different governments until it declared its independence in 1910."
- San Lorenzo: The setting for most of Kurt Vonnegut's novel Cat's Cradle
- San Monique: The setting of the James Bond film Live and Let Die
- San Piedro Island: Washington: From the novel Snow Falling on Cedars by David Guterson
- San Serriffe: April Fools' Day joke from The Guardian
- Sand Island: The initial base of operations for Wardog Squadron in Ace Combat 5: The Unsung War
- Sandy Island
- Sannikov Land: A real world phantom island in the Arctic, featured in Vladimir Obruchev's novel Sannikov Land (1926) and its Soviet film adaptation Sannikov Land (1973)
- Sans Souci (island of no worries): A small private island featured in the novel Deirdre, the Wanderer, by Jonnie Comet
- Santa Marta: A fictional Caribbean island in the novel and film Island in the Sun
- Santa Prisca: A fictional Caribbean island; home country of the DC Comics supervillain Bane
- Scabb Island: An anarchic pirate island in the Caribbean in the game Monkey Island 2: LeChuck's Revenge
- Scheria: Island in Homer's Odyssey, where Odysseus meets Nausicca and Alcinous
- Seal Island: From The Suite Life on Deck
- Seahaven Island: An artificial island from The Truman Show
- Seven Bay Island: An island off the coast of the Northeastern United States, in the Austin family series of books by Madeleine L'Engle. Setting of the novel A Ring of Endless Light
- Sevii Islands: A region in the fictional Pokémon universe, introduced in the Pokémon FireRed and LeafGreen video games
- Shadow Moses Island: From the Metal Gear Solid video game
- Sheena Island: From the game Resident Evil Survivor
- Ship-Trap Island: The setting of Richard Connell's story The Most Dangerous Game
- Shipwreck Island: The meeting place of the Brethren Court in Pirates of the Caribbean: At World's End
- Shutter Island: The setting of the Martin Scorsese film Shutter Island
- Sicmon Islands: A chain of six islands in the South Pacific (Arbah, Katie, Katin, Ta Fin, Quepol and Typ), in the Griffin and Sabine novels by Nick Bantock
- Sinnoh: The setting of Pokémon Diamond and Pearl and their remakes Pokémon Brilliant Diamond and Shining Pearl
- Skeleton Key: An island just off of Cuba, known in Spanish as 'Cayo Esqueleto', in the novel of the same name from the Alex Rider series by Anthony Horowitz
- Skira: An island near China and Russia occupied by the People's Liberation Army in the game Operation Flashpoint: Dragon Rising
- Skull Island: The island King Kong is from
- Skull Island A duck-shaped island in the computergame The Curse of Monkey Island
- Skully Islands: The setting of the Skully Islands insurrection in Air Combat
- Sky Island: a flying island, setting for Sky Island by L. Frank Baum
- Skypiea: an island in the sky, from the One Piece manga series
- Smugglers' Island: An island off the Devon coast near the village of Leathercombe Bay. The main setting of Evil Under the Sun by Agatha Christie
- Island of Sodor: Between England and the Isle of Man, the setting for the Reverend Awdry's Thomas the Tank Engine railway network managed by The Fat Controller.
- Soldier Island: An island in the coasts of Devon, the primary setting of And Then There Were None by Agatha Christie
- Soleanna: An island kingdom from the 2006 video game Sonic the Hedgehog, based on Venice, Italy
- Solgell Island: From the 1967 Japanese film Son of Godzilla
- Solís: An island nation from Just Cause 4
- Solstheim: The main setting of The Elder Scrolls V: Skyrim – Dragonborn
- Southern Island: In the Japanese anime and manga series Hetalia: Axis Powers
- Southern Isles: The homeland of Hans from Disney's Frozen, inspired by Denmark
- Southern Mauristemo Islands: An internet hoax
- South Island: The setting of Sonic the Hedgehog (1991)
- SPECTRE Island: Location of a SPECTRE training facility in the James Bond film From Russia with Love
- Spidermonkey Island: A floating island in Hugh Lofting's The Voyages of Doctor Dolittle
- Spoon Island: Home of Wyndemere Castle, across the harbor of Port Charles, New York, fictional island on the soap opera General Hospital.
- Starfish Island: From Grand Theft Auto: Vice City and Grand Theft Auto: Vice City Stories
- Sula: A Scottish island in the eponymous series of children's books by Lavinia Derwent
- Sunda: A former Dutch colony neighboring Indonesia in Eric Ambler's State of Siege
- Spider-Skull Island: From The Venture Bros.
- Spindrift Island: Off the coast of New Jersey, in the Rick Brant novels by John Blaine
- St. Antoine: A Caribbean island nation in Margaret Atwood's 1982 novel Bodily Harm
- St Gregory: A Channel Island in the TV series Island at War
- Struay: A Hebridean island, the setting of the Katie Morag series of picture books by Mairi Hedderwick
- Summerisle: A fictional Hebridean island and the setting of Robin Hardy's 1973 film The Wicker Man
- Summerset Isle: The homeland of the High Elves from Bethesda's Softworks' The Elder Scrolls
- Summer Camp Island: An island where most monsters live and where most magic exists in the TV series Summer Camp Island
- Swallow, Flint, Mango & Mastodon Islands: In the children's novel Secret Water by Arthur Ransome
- Syberia: An island in the Arctic from the game by the same name and its sequels by Benoît Sokal

== T ==
- Tabor Island: From Jules Verne's novel In Search of the Castaways
- Tanakuatua: Pacific island in John Wyndham's novel Web
- Tanetane Island: An island in the video game Mother 3
- Taratupa: An island in the Pacific Ocean housing a US Navy PT boat base and one of two primary settings in the 1960s sitcom McHale's Navy
- Tatsumi Port Island: From the video game Persona 3
- Tatsumiya Island: From Fafner of the Azure
- Teeny Island: From Mr. Men and Little Miss, known for being the smallest island in the world (2m long and 1m wide).
- Tenrou Island: An island in Fairy Tail where the "S-Class Mage Promotion Trial" takes place.
- Terminus Island: The main locale for the Zombies map Terminus in Call of Duty: Black Ops 6. It is stated to be located in the Philippine Sea.
- The Isles of Syren: The islands on which Septimus, Jenna, and Beetle are trapped on when Spit Fyre breaks his tail in Septimus Heap book five: Syren
- Tinda Lau: An island in the South Pacific, northeast of Australia, featured in the daytime soap opera Days of Our Lives
- Tingle Island: Home of Tingle in the GameCube game The Legend of Zelda: The Wind Waker
- Todday Island: A Hebridean island featured in the 1949 film Whisky Galore!. It combined the two islands, Great Todday and Little Todday, from the original novel by Compton Mackenzie
- Tolaria: An island on the plane of Dominaria in the lore for Magic: the Gathering
- Tol Eressëa: "The Lonely Island" near Valinor inhabited by the Teleri Elves, in J.R.R. Tolkien's The Silmarillion
- Tom Sawyer's Island: The island in the Mississippi River on which Tom Sawyer and Huck Finn live for a few days in The Adventures of Tom Sawyer
- Tracy Island: An island in the TV series Thunderbirds
- Treasure Island: The titular island from the novel by Robert Louis Stevenson. The map of the island in the book is likely based on Unst in Shetland, which Stevenson visited.
- Tsalal: An island in the novel The Narrative of Arthur Gordon Pym by Edgar Allan Poe and its sequel An Antarctic Mystery by Jules Verne
- Tuvalagi: One of many Pacific islands in McHale's Navy, home to a Japanese artillery company
- Tyler Island: A large island in southwestern Usea, used for the launch of the Arsenal Birds and their supply ships, from Ace Combat 7: Skies Unknown

== U ==
- Uffa: Mentioned in Sir Arthur Conan Doyle's story "The Five Orange Pips"
- Utopia: From Sir Thomas More's book of the same name
- Uncharted Island: An uncharted island from Uncharted: Drake's Fortune
- Useless Island: An island on the plane of Ixalan, named by the planeswalker Jace Beleren, in Magic: the Gathering lore
- Uzo Island: An island in Phantasy Star II where the Maruera tree is said to be found

== V ==
- Vanutu: From the novel State of Fear by Michael Crichton
- Villings: From The Invention of Morel by Adolfo Bioy Casares
- Volcano Island: From the animated series The Replacements
- Voya Nui: From Bionicle
- Vvardenfell: The setting for the computer game The Elder Scrolls III: Morrowind

== W ==
- W Island: From the novel W, or the Memory of Childhood by Georges Perec
- Waponi Wu: From the film Joe Versus the Volcano
- Water Seven: From the manga series One Piece
- Wayo Wayo: From the novel The Man with the Compound Eyes by Wu Ming-Yi
- Wedge Island: A golf island from Wii Sports Resort and other Wii games
- West Side Island: The main setting of Sonic the Hedgehog 2
- Wild Island: From My Father's Dragon by Ruth Stiles Gannett
- Wild Cat Island: In the children's novel Swallows and Amazons by Arthur Ransome
- Windfall Island: From the GameCube game The Legend of Zelda: The Wind Waker
- Wuhu Island: An archipelago/beach resort from Wii Sports Resort
- Warbler: From the novel Island of Silence in The Unwanteds series by Lisa McMann.

== Y ==
- Yara: Setting of Far Cry 6; a Caribbean island ruled as a dictatorship, evocative of Cuba, which exists in the game's world as well and is implied to be in close proximity to Yara
- Yew: Setting for The Enchanted Island of Yew by L. Frank Baum
- Yoshi's Island: Setting of several games in the Yoshi video game series

== Z ==
- Zandia: Home of Brother Blood and a "safe harbor" for supervillains in the DC Comics universe
- Zendia: Setting of the Zendian problem
- Zolon: In the Novarian series, an island thalassocracy ruled by a High Admiral
- Zou: Island from One Piece manga series
- Zoombini Isle: The origin of the Zoombinis, featured in the Logical Journey PC puzzle game

== Unnamed ==
- The island in Brave New World by Aldous Huxley
- The island in Robinson Crusoe by Daniel Defoe
- The island in Lord of the Flies by William Golding
- The Outer Hebrides island in the children's novel Great Northern? by Arthur Ransome
- The island in the Windows and Game Boy Advance video game Backyard Football 2006
- The island in the 1980 film The Blue Lagoon and its 1991 sequel Return to the Blue Lagoon (called "Palm Tree Island" in the novel)
- The island in Theodor Herzl's Altneuland (unnamed, but specified as being part of the Cook Islands, near Raratonga)
- The island, which was the location of the Fountain of Youth, in the 2011 film Pirates of the Caribbean: On Stranger Tides
- The unnamed Pacific island where Megatron makes his base in the 2003 Transformers video game.
- An unnamed Caribbean island forms the main setting of Maryse Condé's novel The Gospel According to the New World, said to be an overseas department of France. It is given characteristics of both Martinique and Condé's native Guadeloupe, but many of its locations are fictional, including its airport, major volcano, and an autonomous domain of Mondongue people known as Caracalla.

== See also ==
- Phantom island
- List of fictional countries
