= New Academy Prize in Literature =

The New Academy Prize in Literature
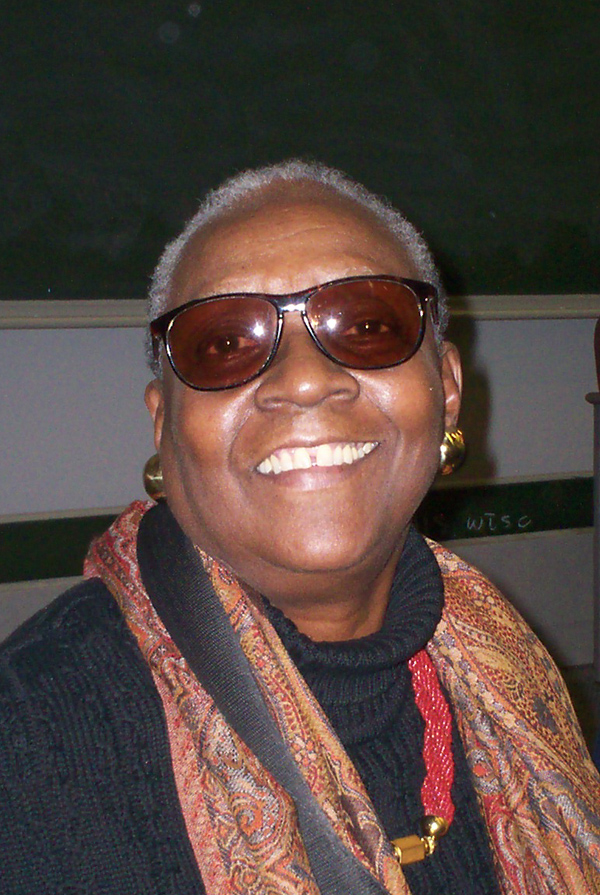
- Maryse Condé – "grand storyteller [whose] authorship belongs to world literature..."
- Date: 12 October 2018; 8 years ago
- Location: Stockholm
- Country: Sweden
- Presented by: Swedish Library Association
- Hosted by: Alexandra Pascalidou, Bianca Kronlöf, and Lo Kauppi
- Reward: SEK 320 000
- 2018 laureate: Maryse Condé

The New Academy Prize in Literature was established in 2018 as an alternative to the Nobel Prize in Literature, which was not awarded in 2018 and instead postponed until 2019. The winner was announced on 12 October 2018, the prize being given to the Guadeloupean-French author Maryse Condé, who was praised by the jury as a "grand storyteller [whose] authorship belongs to world literature, describing the ravages of colonialism and the postcolonial chaos in a language which is both precise and overwhelming."

The New Academy was formed as non-profit organization in 2018, not affiliated with either the Nobel Foundation or the Swedish Academy, and was dissolved in December 2018, with its "alternative Nobel" remaining a one-off award.

== Nominations ==
Following an open invitation to the world, calling for public votes for 47 candidates nominated by Swedish librarians, the New Academy announced that the four finalists for the prize were Maryse Condé, Neil Gaiman, Haruki Murakami, and Kim Thúy. There were 12 nominees each from Sweden and the United States, five from United Kingdom, three each from France and Canada, and two each from Italy and Nigeria.

On 17 September 2018, Murakami requested that his nomination be withdrawn, saying he wanted to "concentrate on writing, away from media attention."

List of nominees for the New Academy Prize in Literature
No.	Nominee	Country	Genre(s)
1	Maryse Condé (1934–2024)	France	novel, drama, essays
2	Haruki Murakami (b. 1949)	Japan	novel, short story, essays
3	Neil Gaiman (b. 1960)	United Kingdom	novel, short story, poetry, screenplay
4	Kim Thúy (b. 1968)	Vietnam; Canada	novel
5	Margaret Atwood (b. 1939)	Canada	novel, short story, poetry, essays, literary criticism
6	Paul Auster (1947–2024)	United States	novel, short story, essays, memoirs, poetry, screenplay, translation
7	Don DeLillo (b. 1936)	United States	novel, short story, drama, screenplay, essays
8	Kerstin Ekman (b. 1933)	Sweden	novel
9	Jamaica Kincaid (b. 1949)	Antigua and Barbuda; United States	novel, essays, short story
10	David Levithan (b. 1972)	United States	novel, short story, essays
11	Cormac McCarthy (1933–2023)	United States	novel, drama, screenplay, short story
12	Ian McEwan (b. 1948)	United Kingdom	novel, short story, screenplay, drama
13	Joyce Carol Oates (b. 1938)	United States	novel, drama, poetry, short story, essays, literary criticism
14	Nnedi Okorafor (b. 1974)	Nigeria; United States	novel, short story
15	Sofi Oksanen (b. 1977)	Finland	novel, drama, poetry, essays
16	Thomas Pynchon (b. 1937)	United States	novel, short story, essays
17	Meg Rosoff (b. 1956)	United Kingdom	novel
18	J. K. Rowling (b. 1965)	United Kingdom	novel, screenplay
19	Ngũgĩ wa Thiong'o (1938–2025)	Kenya	novel, drama, short story, essays
20	Jeanette Winterson (b. 1949)	United Kingdom	novel, short story, memoirs
21	Chimamanda Ngozi Adichie (b. 1977)	Nigeria	novel, short story, essays
22	Johannes Anyuru (b. 1979)	Sweden	novel, poetry
23	Silvia Avallone (b. 1984)	Italy	novel, poetry
24	Nina Bouraoui (b. 1967)	France	novel, short story, songwriting
25	Anne Carson (b. 1950)	Canada	poetry, essays
26	Inger Edelfeldt (b. 1956)	Sweden	novel, poetry
27	Elena Ferrante (b. 1943)	Italy	novel
28	Jens Ganman (b. 1971)	Sweden	novel, essays, songwriting, screenplay
29	Siri Hustvedt (b. 1955)	United States	novel, poetry, essays
30	Jenny Jägerfeld (b. 1974)	Sweden	novel
31	Jonas Hassen Khemiri (b. 1978)	Sweden	novel, short story, drama, essays
32	Édouard Louis (b. 1992)	France	novel, essays
33	Sara Lövestam (b. 1980)	Sweden	novel, short story
34	Ulf Lundell (b. 1949)	Sweden	novel, poetry, songwriting
35	Amos Oz (1939–2018)	Israel	novel, short story, essays
36	Sara Paborn (b. 1972)	Sweden	novel
37	Agneta Pleijel (b. 1940)	Sweden	novel, poetry, essays, literary criticism
38	Marilynne Robinson (b. 1943)	United States	novel, essays
39	Arundhati Roy (b. 1961)	India	novel, essays
40	Jessica Schiefauer (b. 1978)	Sweden	novel
41	Jón Kalman Stefánsson (b. 1963)	Iceland	novel, poetry
42	Patti Smith (b. 1946)	United States	poetry, songwriting
43	Zadie Smith (b. 1975)	United Kingdom	novel, short story, drama, essays
44	Peter Stamm (b. 1963)	Switzerland	novel, essays, drama, translation
45	Sara Stridsberg (b. 1972)	Sweden	novel, drama, essays
46	Donna Tartt (b. 1963)	United States	novel
47	Olga Tokarczuk (b. 1962)	Poland	novel, short story, poetry, essay, screenplay

== The winner ==
The New Academy Prize in Literature was awarded to Maryse Condé. The jury said in its citation:

"Maryse Condé is a grand storyteller. Her authorship belongs to world literature. In her work, she describes the ravages of colonialism and the postcolonial chaos in a language which is both precise and overwhelming. The magic the dream and the terror is as also love constantly present. Fiction and reality overlap each other and people live as much in an imagined world with long and complicated traditions as the ongoing present. Respectfully and with humour she narrates the postcolonial insanity disruption and abuse but also human solidarity and warmth The dead live in her stories closely to the living in a multitudinous world where gender race and class are constantly turned over in new constellations."

Maryse Condé received the prize on 10 December 2018 at a ceremony at Berns salonger in Stockholm. The prize sum, 320 000 Swedish crowns, was created through crowdfunding and sponsorship.

Condé, a writer from Guadeloupe, was particularly noted for her novels Segu (1984), Tree of Life: A Novel of the Caribbean (1987) and Windward Heights (1995). When Condé died in 2024, The Guardian obituary of her noted that she had considered this award an especially important achievement and that she had dedicated the prize to all the people of Guadeloupe, saying: "We are such a small country, only mentioned when there are hurricanes or earthquakes and things like that. Now we are so happy to be recognised for something else."

== Reactions ==
The establishment of the prize caused several negative reactions in Swedish media, some criticizing the New Academy's intention to award "morally good literature" and cultural journalist Göran Sommardal called the prize "pathetic". Swedish author Ulf Lundell, himself one of the 47 nominees for the prize, said he thought that "no author of any self-preservation will accept it". Internationally, reactions were more positive, Alison Flood wrote in The Guardian: "Perhaps the most striking detail of all is found not in the names, but the fine print. The New Academy is enforcing a gender quota on the shortlist stage, stipulating that it comprises two men and two women. How different this is to the Nobel, which counts among its 114 winners just 14 women", and also praised the nomination process of public votes: "How open. How inclusive."
