= Eric Visser =

- Born: June 4, 1951 (age 74)
- Occupation: publisher
- Years active: 1983–present
- Known for: De Geus and World Editions

Eric Visser (born 4 June 1951) is the founder of both the Dutch publishing house De Geus and the Dutch-based publishing house World Editions.

== De Geus ==
In 1983, he founded Dutch independent publishing house De Geus. Since then, he has continuously worked in publishing, as a publisher and managing director of De Geus. De Geus was based in Breda, while most of the contemporary publishing houses were in Amsterdam, because of this it was believed De Gues would not see success. As a self-stated firm believer in the saying: "The world starts where you are", Visser was personally motivated do the hard work.

Visser typed out and stapled the pages of the first title himself. De Geus grew steadily each year since its founding in 1983. As of April, 2026, De Geus has published over 2500 books.

Visser wanted to publish books that have depth and discuss social issues. The books had to reflect society, which is presumed to be why De Geus' seeks is to publish literature from all over the world by as many female as male authors.

Throughout the years Eric Visser and de Geus have published several authors, notably including Maya Angelou, Alaa Al-Aswany, Majgull Axelsson, Pat Barker, Aifric Campbell, Javier Cercas, and Jim Crace. Fourteen authors published by De Geus have gone on to win the Nobel Prize for Literature, including J.M.G. Le Clézio, Herta Müller, Mo Yan and Alice Munro.

Kader Abdolah, Esther Gerritsen and Annelies Verbeke’s debut novels were also published by De Geus, and now they are considered by many to be among the best writers of Dutch and Flemish literature.

In addition to working for De Geus and World Editions, Eric Visser was a board member for The General Publishing Group of the Dutch Publishers Association (which represents the interests of the affiliated publishing companies throughout the Netherlands) and for Literature Festival Winternachten in The Hague (a cultural festival with more than eighty writers, artists and musicians from approximately fifteen countries) and for the CPNB (Collective Promotion for the Dutch Book). He is also a member of the PEN International Publishers Circle.

In 2016, De Geus was sold to Singel Uitgeverijen and will relocate to Amsterdam.

== World Editions ==
In 2013, Eric Visser started a new publishing house World Editions, a spin-off of De Geus. WE aims to make important titles available for the greatest possible audience. WE publishes in English for the international market.

WE's first titles were published in 2015: Craving by Esther Gerritsen, Gliding Flight by Anne-Gine Goemans, and Saturday’s Shadows by Ayesha Harruna Attah.

== Awards and honours ==
In 2012 Eric received the French Chevalier des Arts et des Lettres award. In 2015, he was conferred as a Knight of the First Class Royal Norwegian Order of Merit.
