= Segu =

Segu may refer to:

- Ségou, a city in south-central Mali, the former capital of the Bamana Empire
- Sergi López Segú, Spanish footballer
- Segu (novel), by Maryse Condé
- SEGU, the old ICAO airport code for José Joaquín de Olmedo International Airport, which serves Guayaquil in Ecuador
