= World Editions =

European independent publishing house

- Founded: 2013; 13 years ago
- Founder: Eric Visser
- Country of origin: Netherlands, USA, UK
- Headquarters location: Amsterdam, New York, London
- Distribution: Ingram Publisher Services (USA); Turnaround Publisher Services (UK)
- Publication types: Books
- Official website: worldeditions.org

World Editions is a New York-based independent publishing house that publishes literary fiction in translation. World Editions was founded in Amsterdam in 2013 by Eric Visser, publisher of Dutch literary house De Geus, initially with the mission to bring Dutch literature in translation to English-speaking readers. Now led by publisher Christine Swedowsky, World Editions is the home of award-winning authors from all over the world.

== History ==
World Editions promotes voices from around the globe by publishing books from many different countries and languages into English translation.

World Editions was founded in 2013 by Eric Visser, publisher of Dutch literary house De Geus―home to many Nobel Prize-winning authors. From 2016 to 2023, World Editions was part of the independent Libella Group, a European publisher with bases in Switzerland, France, and Poland, led by the renowned Vera Michalski. Judith Uyterlinde, Publishing Director of World Editions from 2017 to 2023, was passionate about literature and languages, and dedicated to bringing attention to outstanding writers from around the world. After successfully launching in the US in March 2018, World Editions had offices in New York, London, and Amsterdam. In 2023, World Editions was bought by senior staff member Christine Swedowsky, and once again became an independent publisher, headquartered in New York City.

World Editions publishes award-winning and long-established authors, such as the late Maryse Condé, two-times National Book Award Finalist Pilar Quintana, two-times National Book Award Finalist Samar Yazbek, as well as number-1 bestselling German author Juli Zeh and Amin Maalouf, one of the Arab world's most influential writers.

World Editions was officially launched in January 2015. The first titles were Craving by Esther Gerritsen translated by Michele Hutchison, Gliding Flight by Anne-Gine Goemans, translated by Nancy Forest-Flier, and Saturday's Shadows by Ayesha Harruna Attah. In 2015, World Editions published books translated from the Dutch, Swedish, Icelandic, Russian, Norwegian, and Chinese. In 2016, Turkish, Italian, French, and Spanish were added to the list. By 2026, World Editions had published 85 titles from 30 countries, including Argentina, Belgium, Canada, Chile, China, Colombia, the Czech Republic, Denmark, Ecuador, Estonia, France, Germany, Greece, Guadeloupe, Hong Kong, Italy, Japan, Lebanon, Malaysia, Mozambique, the Netherlands, New Zealand, Norway, Poland, Singapore, South Africa, Spain, Sweden, Syria, and Taiwan.

In 2026, World Editions announced the collectible Read the World A to Z series, which features translated novels from Argentina to Zambia – one country for every letter of the alphabet. Publisher Christine Swedowsky is focused on geographically diversifying the World Editions list, and on acquiring contemporary, edgy titles which feature the disobedience of defiant female characters.

== Award-winning titles ==
In 2020, Helios Disaster by Linda Bostroem Knausgaard was longlisted for the National Book Award.In the same year, The Bitch by Pilar Quintana was selected as a National Book Award Finalist in Translation. In 2021, Maryse Condé Waiting for the Waters to Rise was longlisted for the National Book Award in Translation, and Samar Yazbek's Planet of Clay was honored as a National Book Award Finalist in Translation. In the same year, Dutch author Jaap Robben was longlisted for the International Booker Prize with his book Summer Brother. In 2023, Pilar Quintana's Abyss was a National Book Award in Translation Finalist and Maryse Condé's The Gospel According to the New World was selected an International Booker Prize Finalist. Syrian writer Samar Yazbek was once again a National Book Award in Translation Finalist in 2024 with her novel Where the Wind Calls Home.

== Non-translated titles ==
Though the focus is on translations, World Editions also publishes novels that were originally written in English. In September 2018, World Editions published the powerful and intimate memoir Always Another Country by Sisonke Msimang; a book that has received enthusiastic reviews from both US and UK press. In 2016, World Editions published four Carol Shields novels: The Stone Diaries, Happenstance, Mary Swann, and The Republic of Love. These were the first republications from the publisher. In 2025, World Editions published State of Emergency by Jeremy Tiang, winner of the 2018 Singapore Literature Prize.

== Design of books ==
Tessa van der Waals (Netherlands) is responsible for the cover design, cover typography, and art direction of all World Editions books. She works in the internationally renowned tradition of Dutch Design. Her bright and powerful visual aesthetic maintains a harmony between image and typography, and captures the unique atmosphere of each book. She works closely with internationally celebrated photographers, artists, and letter designers. Her work has frequently been awarded prizes for Best Dutch Book Design.

World Editions covers are edited by lithographer Bert van der Horst of BFC Graphics (Netherlands).

Euan Monaghan (Netherlands) is responsible for the typography and careful interior book design of all World Editions titles.

The text on the inside covers and the press quotes are set in Circular, designed by Laurenz Brunner (Switzerland) and published by Swiss type foundry Lineto.

All World Editions books are set in the typeface Dolly, specifically designed for book typography. Dolly creates a warm page image perfect for an enjoyable reading experience. This typeface is designed by Underware, a European collective formed by Bas Jacobs (Netherlands), Akiem Helmling (Germany), and Sami Kortemäki (Finland). Underware are also the creators of the World Editions logo, which meets the design requirement that "a strong shape can always be drawn with a toe in the sand".

=== World Editions authors ===
- Héctor Abad
- Maryse Condé
- Amin Maalouf
- Paolo Maurensig
- Sisonke Msimang
- Mia Couto
- Benoîte Groult
- Adeline Dieudonné
- Pierre Jarawan
- Frédéric Beigbeder
- Esther Gerritsen
- Jaap Robben
- Tatiana de Rosnay
- Johannes Anyuru
- Linda Boström Knausgård
- Renate Dorrestein
- Kristien Hemmerechts
- Michael Kaufman
- Li Kotomi
- Tom Lanoye
- Håkan Nesser
- Carol Shields
- Charles den Tex
- Annelies Verbeke
- Saskia de Coster
- Marente de Moor
- Pilar Quintana
- Preeta Samarasan
- Zhang Yueran
- Petra Hůlová

=== World Editions translators ===
- Anne McLean
- Frank Wynne
- David Doherty
- Martin Aitken
- Anne Milano Appel
- Roland Glasser
- Jonathan Reeder
- Michele Hutchison
- Saskia Vogel
- Rosalind Harvey
- Sinéad Crowe
- Rachel McNicholl
- Vivien D. Glass
- Paul Vincent
- Liz Waters
- David Brookshaw
- Lisa Dillman
- Rachel Willson-Broyles
- Nancy Forest-Flier
- Philip Boehm
- Hester Velmans
- Natasha Lehrer
- Mo Teitelbaum
- Richard Philcox
