= Ubu Repertory Theater =

US theater dedicated to presenting French-language plays

Coordinates: 40.70488°N 74.007643°W

The Ubu Repertory Theater is the only US theater dedicated to presenting French-language plays both in English and French productions. The Ubu Repertory Theater provides Americans with a unique perspective into the world of Francophone cultures: the French-speaking European countries, as well as the ones located in North America, Africa, and the Caribbean islands.

== History ==
Founded in 1982 by Françoise Kourilsky, Ubu Rep serves as a forum for cross-cultural exchange in New York, NY. The company encourages the collaboration of translators, directors, actors, playwrights, and theater professionals as a way to foster international cooperation.

== The Theater ==
Ubu originally performed in a small, second-floor theater in Chelsea, Manhattan, on Mercer Street. The company relocated in 1989 on West 28th Street in a 99-seat theater. In 1999, Ubu Rep moved into new offices located at 95 Wall Street (at the bottom of Wall Street) and shared its floor office with FIAF. The new space however did not include its own theater. The company worked on a number of larger Off-Broadway productions such as the La MaMa Experimental Theatre Club's Annex Theater and the Alliance Française French Institute's Florence Gould Hall to accommodate its growing popularity. Ubu Rep also provided a large selection of francophone plays year round through its reading series.

Past key-staff members include French-Australian director, Morgan Dowsett, and French-American writer-director-producer, Frederic Colier.

== Ubu Bilingual Company ==
Still under Kourilsky's leadership, Ubu Rep also founded the Ubu Bilingual Company. The troupe has performed bilingual productions including Jean-Paul Sartre's "Huis Clos/No Exit" (1985) and Albert Camus's "Le Malentendu/The Misunderstanding" and "Les Justes/The Just Assassins" (1998), Jean Anouilh's, "Antigone," (2000), Denise Bonal's "In Transit", and Xavier Durringer's "Murder in Mind," (2001), and many others.

== Ubu Repertory Theater Publications ==
Translations and publications are an important step of Ubu Rep's mission. Many authors have been commissioned to have their play translated, performed, and then published: Aimé Césaire, Jean Tardieu, Jean-Claude Grumberg, Simone Schwarz-Bart, Sony Labou Tansi and Bernard-Marie Koltès and Tilly, Kateb Yanice, Maryse Condé, Koffi Kwahulé, and Michel Tremblay to name a few of its vast catalogue of individual and anthologized published plays. As of 2002, Theater Communications Group (TCG) handles all the distribution of Ubu Rep's catalogue.

== End of the First Chapter ==
The 9/11 attack on the World Trade Center took a heavy toll on the company given its offices close proximity. On-going fire at the site of the attack, aggravated by dangerous air contamination, prohibited access to the downtown area for weeks on end. Françoise Kourilsky decided to retire and dissolved the company at the beginning of the summer 2002, though not before running a final celebration: "Bravo Ubu" celebrating the 20 Years of the company presence in New York, with Ellen Stewart and Tom Bishop as the masters of the ceremonies. The celebration took place at the Florence Gould Hall in May 2002. Françoise Kourilsky died in Paris in 2012.

== New Chapter ==
Since the summer 2017, a group of ex-staffers, actors and playwrights, are working towards bringing Ubu Rep back to the New York theater scene.
