= The Unwanteds (novel) =

2011 fantasy novel by Lisa McMann

- Author: Lisa McMann
- Language: English
- Genre: Children's fantasy
- Publisher: Aladdin
- Publication date: August 30, 2000
- Publication place: United States
- Media type: Print, digital, audio
- Pages: 390
- ISBN: 978-1442407688
- OCLC: 693810559
- LC Class: PZ7.M478757 Unw 2011
- Followed by: Island Of Silence

The Unwanteds is a fantasy novel by Lisa McMann and published by Aladdin in 2011. It is recommended for ages 8–15.

== Plot ==
On the island of Quill, anyone who displays artistic talent is Unwanted and sent to the Death Farm for execution when they turn thirteen. Alex Stowe, the son of two 'Necessaries', has two strikes against him and has known his fate since the age of ten. On the day of the annual Purge, he is declared an 'Unwanted' and sent to his death, along with twenty other young teens. Meanwhile, his twin brother, Aaron is declared a 'Wanted' and sent to the University for training as one of Quill's leaders.

When Alex and the other Unwanteds are dropped off at The Great Lake Of Boiling Oil, however, they are shocked to find themselves welcomed into the magical land of Artimè, created, hidden, and led by a mage called Mr. Today, with the help of his many staff. While Alex and his new friends learn magic from art and creativity, Aaron displays loyalty and usefulness by creating the Favored Farm, an exclusive farm intended to provide the Wanteds of Quill with an abundance of healthy plants and animals. Through this action, he attracts the notice of High Priest Justine and rises to the prominent position of her assistant secretary. Alex soon begins to miss his brother Aaron which leads to big mistakes on Alex's part.

Then, due to a mistake on Alex's part, Aaron, Justine, and Governor Strang make a surprise visit to The Great Lake Of Boiling Oil and discover Artimè. Quill immediately attacks these Unwanteds who have the gall not to be dead already. During the ensuing war, Aaron attacks Mr. Today, nearly killing his own twin, Alex. In the end, however, the people of Artimè defeat the Quillitary in a terrible battle and an uneasy truce is forged.

== Critical reception ==
In a review by Kirkus, The Unwanteds is noted as a cross between The Hunger Games and Harry Potter.

== Books in this series ==
- The Unwanteds (2011)
- Island of Silence (2012)
- Island of Fire (2013)
- Island of Legends (2014)
- Island of Shipwrecks (2015)
- Island of Graves (2015)
- Island of Dragons (2016)

== See also ==
- The Unwanteds (series)
- Island Of Silence
- Dragon Captives

Awards
| Preceded by Out of My Mind | Mark Twain Award; 1887 | Succeeded by Wonder |
