= I, Tituba: Black Witch of Salem =

French novel by Maryse Condé

- First edition
- Author: Maryse Condé
- Original title: Moi, Tituba, Sorcière... Noire de Salem
- Language: French
- Set in: Salem, Massachusetts
- Published: 1 January 1986
- Publisher: Mercure de France
- English publication date: 13 September 1992; University of Virginia Press
- Pages: 276 pp.
- Awards: French Grand Prix (1986)
- Preceded by: The Children of Segu
- Followed by: Tree of Life

I, Tituba, Black Witch of Salem (French: Moi, Tituba, Sorcière... Noire de Salem) is a French novel by Maryse Condé published in 1986. It won the French Grand Prix award for women's literature.

The novel was translated into English in 1992 by her husband, Richard Philcox and published under the title above, with the help of a translation grant from the National Endowment for the Humanities. The English translation includes a foreword by activist Angela Davis, who calls the book an "historical novel about the black witch of Salem". While related to the Salem witch trials, Condé's novel is a work of fiction.

== Plot ==
In the novel Tituba is biracial, born on Barbados to a young enslaved African woman who was raped by an English sailor. Tituba's mother is hanged after defending herself from the sexual advances of her white enslaver. Tituba is run off the plantation and becomes a maroon, having no enslaver, but not able to connect to society. She grows up living with an old spiritual herbalist named Mama Yaya, and learning about traditional healing methods. She falls in love and marries an enslaved man, John Indian, willing to return to slavery on his behalf.

Shortly thereafter, Tituba and John Indian are sold to Samuel Parris, the Puritan clergyman known historically for bringing about the Salem Witch Trials. Parris takes Tituba and John Indian to Boston, then to Salem Village, where Tituba is accused of witchcraft and arrested. Tituba is thrown into a cell with a pregnant Hester Prynne, the heroine from Nathaniel Hawthorne's novel The Scarlet Letter.

Tituba survives the trials by confessing, and is sold as a servant to a Jewish merchant, Benjamin Cohen d'Azevedo. She cares for Benjamin and his nine children until the Puritans set fire to the house, killing all the children. He decides to set her free, and sends her back to Barbados.

Tituba initially stays with a group of maroons, sleeping with their leader, Christopher, who dreams of immortality. She returns to the shack where she had lived with Mama Yaya, and works as a healing herbalist for the enslaved people in the area. The enslaved people bring her a young man, Iphigene, who they thought would die, but Tituba nurses him back to health. He plans a revolt against the plantation owners. The night before the revolt, the couple are arrested. They and his followers are hanged. Tituba and Iphigene join the spirit realm, inciting future revolts whenever possible.

== Reception ==
The novel won the French Grand Prix award for women's literature in 1986.

Literary scholar Jane Moss described it as a "broader indictment of U.S. society" than The Crucible that was "enormously popular among U.S. feminists, multiculturalists, and francophone studies scholars because it fulfills the desire for first-person narrative by a strong Third World woman and it startles us with its version of an episode in our history". Although the foreword describes I, Tituba, Black Witch of Salem as a "historical novel," the afterword of the translated novel, written by Ann Armstrong Scarboro, details an interview with Condé stating that I, Tituba is "not a historical novel. . .just the opposite".

When it was published in English, it received excellent reviews. The Boston Sunday Globe said: "Stunning...Maryse Condé's imaginative subversion of historical records forms a critique of contemporary American society and its ingrained racism and sexism."

It also has been analyzed in literary academic journals and frequently assigned as mandatory reading in college English classes. Scholars like Zubeda Jalalzai, a professor of English at Rhode Island College, have compared the fictional extension of Tituba's character with the historical accounts accumulated from the 1692 Salem Witch Trials. They note that the novel blurs the line between the historical records from that time and Conde's added creation of events. Jalalzai names Condé as a "postmodern briocleur" that uses portions of the historical record to frame her new extensions for the text, demonstrating how fiction and history coincide to form an interdependent relationship to enhance the themes of the novel. The limited historical accounts of her confession imply strategic manipulation from Tituba as a matter of survival, which the novel uses for the imaginative narrative to frame Tituba as a figure of empowerment as she navigates the Puritan society in which she is ultimately the victim.

The novel has been criticized for using a fictional narrative to rewrite the story of the real-life Tituba. It has further been criticized for transforming Tituba's identity as an Amerindian woman from Barbados into that of an African slave woman, a criticism shared of other writing detailing Tituba's story, including William Carlos Williams' play Tituba's Children as well as Arthur Miller's The Crucible.

It has been suggested that the title I, Tituba is an echo of the testimonial autobiography of Rigoberta Menchú titled I, Rigoberta Menchú.
