= The Gospel According to the New World =

2021 novel by Maryse Condé

- First edition
- Author: Maryse Condé
- Original title: L'Évangile du nouveau monde
- Translator: Richard Philcox
- Language: French
- Publisher: Éditions Buchet-Chastel
- Publication date: 1 October 2021
- English publication date: 7 March 2023 (World Editions)
- Media type: Print (hardback & paperback)
- Pages: 278 pp. (Éditions Buchet-Chastel); 184 pp. (World Editions)
- Preceded by: The Wondrous and Tragic Life of Ivan and Ivana

The Gospel According to the New World (French: L'Évangile du nouveau monde) is a French novel by Guadeloupan writer Maryse Condé published in October 2021. Set in Martinique, the novel follows the journey of a miracle baby, named Pascal, rumoured to be the child of God in search of his origins and mission. Described by the Financial Times as "a parody of the New Testament", the novel mixes Caribbean folklore with the Bible.

World Editions published the novel's English-language translation, by Condé's husband Richard Philcox, in March 2023, and it was shortlisted for the 2023 International Booker Prize. The judging panel described The Gospel According to the New World as a "deceptively simple novel full of wisdom, generosity of spirit and the writer’s palpable tenderness towards the world and her craft". At the time of the nomination, Condé was the oldest person to have been shortlisted for the prize.
