= The Children of Segu =

1984 novel by Maryse Condé

- First edition
- Author: Maryse Condé
- Original title: Ségou: la terre en miettes
- Translator: Linda Coverdale
- Language: French
- Publisher: Éditions Robert Laffont
- Publication date: 11 January 1985
- English publication date: 3 November 1989 (Viking Press); 17 October 1990 (Ballantine Books)
- Media type: Print (hardback & paperback)
- Pages: 426 pp. (Robert Laffont); 512 pp. (Viking Press)
- Preceded by: Segu: A Novel
- Followed by: I, Tituba: Black Witch of Salem

The Children of Segu (French: Ségou: la terre en miettes, lit. Segu: The Earth in Pieces) is a French sequel to Maryse Condé's 1984 historical fiction Segu. The novel follows the 19th-century tribal wars, Islamic conquests and French occupation of the African kingdom, focusing on the Traore family's further history and kins.
