= Ayesha Harruna Attah =

Ghanaian-born fiction writer (born 1983)

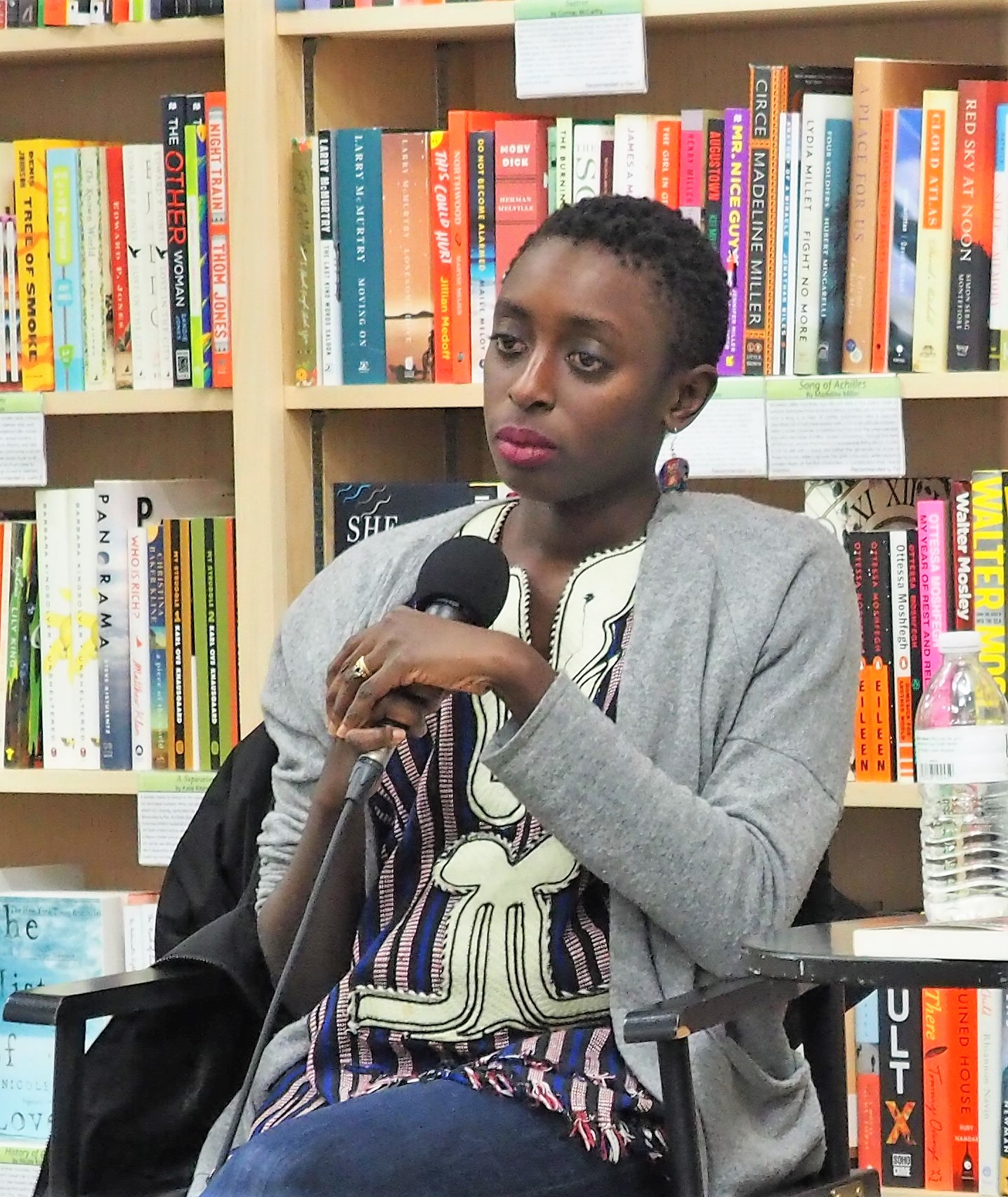
- Born: December 1983 (age 42–43); Accra, Ghana
- Education: Mount Holyoke College; Columbia University; New York University
- Occupation: Novelist
- Writing career
- Genre: Fiction
- Website: www.ayeshaattah.com

Ayesha Harruna Attah (born December 1983) is a Ghanaian-born fiction writer. She lives in Senegal.

== Early years and education ==
Ayesha Harruna Attah was born in Accra, Ghana, in the 1980s, under a military government, to a mother who was a journalist and father who was a graphic designer. Attah has said: "My parents were my first major influences. They ran a literary magazine called Imagine, which had stories about Accra; articles on art, science, film, books; cartoons—which I especially loved. They were (and still are) my heroes. I discovered Toni Morrison when I was thirteen, and I was hooked. I devoured everything she wrote. I remember reading Paradise, and while its meaning completely evaded me then, I was left feeling like it was the most amazing book written and that one day I wanted to write a world full of strong female characters, just like Ms. Morrison had done."

After growing up in Accra, she moved to Massachusetts, United States, and studied biochemistry at Mount Holyoke College, and then earned her master's degree in magazine journalism at the Columbia University, and she received an MFA in creative writing at New York University.

== Writing ==
Attah has published five novels. Her debut book Harmattan Rain (2008) was written as the result of a fellowship from Per Ankh Publishers — under the mentorship of Ghanaian novelist Ayi Kwei Armah — and TrustAfrica, and was shortlisted for the 2010 Commonwealth Writers' Prize (Africa Region). Her second novel Saturday's Shadows, published by World Editions in 2015, was nominated for the Kwani? Manuscript Project, and has been published in Dutch (De Geus). Her third novel is The Hundred Wells of Salaga (2019), dealing with "relationships, desires and struggles in women’s lives in Ghana in the late 19th century during the scramble for Africa". She has written The Deep Blue Between, a novel for young adults. Her fifth novel, the romantic comedy Zainab Takes New York, was released in April 2022.

As a 2014 AIR Award laureate, Attah was a writer-in-residence at the Instituto Sacatar in Bahia, Brazil. She also won a Miles Morland Foundation Writing Scholarship in 2016 for a proposed non-fiction book on the history of the kola nut.

Attah was selected by Bernardine Evaristo to be mentored as a protégé, for the Rolex Mentor and Protégé Arts Initiative in 2023–2024.

=== Harmattan Rain (2008) ===
Harmattan Rain, published in 2008, follows the three-generational story of a Ghanaian family, including Lizzie-Achiaa, Akua Afriyie and Sugri.

Lizzie-Achiaa was the brave matriarch of their family, who ran off looking for her lover and at the same time pursuing a nursing career. Her rebellious daughter, artist Akua Afriye, strikes out on her own as a single parent in a country rocked by successive coups, and Akua Afriye's only daughter Sugri was a lovely, smart girl who grew up too sheltered then leaves home for university in New York, where she learns that sometimes one can have too much freedom.

=== Saturday's Shadows (2015) ===
Set in 1990s West Africa, Saturday's Shadows is about "a family that is struggling to maintain its cohesion in the midst of a tenuous political setting", of which it has been said: "Attah proves once again her proficiency as a writer. She demonstrates her dexterity as a writer with the accuracy and lucidity of her character development."

=== The Hundred Wells of Salaga (2019) ===
Aminah lives an idyllic life until she is brutally separated from her home and forced on a journey that transforms her from a daydreamer into a resilient woman. Wurche, the willful daughter of a chief, is desperate to play an important role in her father's court. These two women's lives converge as infighting among Wurche's people threatens the region, during the height of the slave trade at the end of the nineteenth century.

Through the experiences of Aminah and Wurche, The Hundred Wells of Salaga depicts slavery and how the scramble for Africa affected the lives of everyday people.

=== The Deep Blue Between (2020) ===
Twin sisters Hassana and Husseina's home is in ruins after a brutal raid. The twins pursue separate paths in Brazil and the Gold Coast of West Africa, and they remain connected through shared dreams of water.

== Personal life ==
Ayesha is the daughter of Alhaji Abdul Rahman Harruna Attah and Nana Yaa Agyeman. She also has a sister called Rahma.

== Works ==
Novels

- Harmattan Rain. Popenguine, Senegal, West Africa: Per Ankh, 2008. ISBN 9782911928123, OCLC 310739454
- Saturday's Shadows. London: World Editions, 2015. ISBN 9789462380431, OCLC 903399393
- The Hundred Wells of Salaga. New York: Other Press, 2019. ISBN 9781590519950, OCLC 1035458812
- The Deep Blue Between. London: Pushkin Press, 2020. ISBN 9781782692669

Essays

- "Skinny Mini", Ugly Duckling Diaries, July 2015
- "The Intruder", The New York Times Magazine, September 2015
- "Cheikh Anta Diop – An Awakening", Chimurenga, 9 April 2018
- "Opinion: Slow-Cooking History", The New York Times, 10 November 2018
- "Inside Ghana: A Tale of Love, Loss and Slavery", Newsweek, 21 February 2019

Other writing

- "Second Home, Plus Yacht", Yachting Magazine, October 2007
- "Incident on the way to the Bakoy Market", Asymptote Magazine, 2013
- "Unborn Children", in Margaret Busby (ed.), New Daughters of Africa, 2019.
