= Tree of Life (novel) =

1987 novel by Maryse Condé

Tree of Life: A Novel of the Caribbean
- First edition
- Author: Maryse Condé
- Original title: La vie scélérate
- Translator: Victoria Reiter
- Language: French
- Publisher: Éditions Seghers
- Publication date: 8 October 1987
- English publication date: 1 September 1992 (Ballantine Books)
- Media type: Print (hardback & paperback)
- Pages: 336 pp. (first edition, hardback)
- Preceded by: I, Tituba: Black Witch of Salem
- Followed by: Crossing the Mangrove

Tree of Life: A Novel of the Caribbean (French: La vie scélérate, lit. The Wicked Life) is a 1987 novel by the Guadeloupean writer, Maryse Condé, translated into English in 1992 by Victoria Reiter. The novel tells a multigenerational story about the emergence of the West Indian middle class. It won the Le Prix de l’Académie française in 1988.

== Plot summary ==
Tree of Life is narrated by Coco, the great granddaughter of Albert Louis, a Guadeloupean man who tries to raise himself out of poverty. Albert Louis travels to Panama, to work on the construction of the Panama Canal and escape, and later to San Francisco to realize his ambitions. After a decade of travelling, Albert Louis returns to Guadeloupe. Albert Louis marries his first wife, Liza, and has a son, Albert (Bert). Liza dies giving birth to Bert. Bert grows up and moves to San Francisco with his friend/business partner, Jacob. While in San Francisco Jacob is murdered and Bert then returns to Guadeloupe. Albert marries his second wife, Elaise, who gives him two more children; Jacob and Jean. Liza haunts Bert because of his love for his Stepmother, Elaise. Bert resents his father and his father's business and eventually leaves for Paris to reunite with an old friend/business partner, Manuel. While in Paris, Bert jumps to his death. Elaise begins to suffer from a series of hemorrhages, supposedly due to the supernatural presence of Albert's first wife (Liza) and dies after the third occurrence.

== Reviews ==
Tree of Life has been positively reviewed by a number of sources. The Chicago Tribune called the novel "a grand account of the Caribbean, the politics of race and immigration, and the intricate, often sordid legacy of colonialism". and it was described in the Los Angeles Times as "a potent mix of memory, legend and reality". A Publishers Weekly review noted that "Conde's vast skills as a storyteller rest in her intensely vivid characterizations, and her gifts for nuance, humor and analysis command the reader's attention and respect."
