= TrustAfrica =

TrustAfrica, originally called the "Special Initiative for Africa", is an independent foundation that works to secure the conditions for democracy and equitable development throughout the continent. Led by Africans, it convenes dialogues, catalyzes ideas, and provides grants and technical assistance to organizations working to advance these goals.

Its programs currently focus on three issues:

• Democracy and Civil Society — securing the conditions for democracy by strengthening the capacity of civil society organizations.

• Equitable Development — fostering African enterprise and extending the benefits of economic growth to all members of society.

• African Philanthropy — leveraging new and traditional forms of African giving to advance democracy and development and to minimize reliance on external donors.

Now based in Dakar, Senegal, TrustAfrica began in 2001 as an initiative of the Ford Foundation to amplify African voices within the international donor community. TrustAfrica became an independent organization, governed by Africans, in 2006. It is committed to generating new philanthropic resources—and cultivating a greater degree of African ownership—by raising money from individuals and corporations in Africa and throughout the African diaspora.

Acting as a catalyst and convener, TrustAfrica brings together civic leaders from across the continent for thoughtful workshops aimed at setting agendas and crafting solutions to Africa's democratic and developmental challenges. As a grant maker, it then solicits proposals to test new ideas and strategies that emerge from these discussions. In particular, TrustAfrica supports initiatives designed to strengthen the capacity of civil society organizations to secure democracy; foster sustainable and equitable development; and leverage African philanthropic support for democratization. TrustAfrica does not accept unsolicited requests for funding.

It has received funding from the Ford Foundation, Bill & Melinda Gates Foundation, International Development Research Centre, Humanity United, Netherlands Ministry of Foreign Affairs, Open Society Institute, Oak Foundation, David & Lucille Packard Foundation, John D. and Catherine T. MacArthur Foundation, W.K. Kellogg Foundation, and other funders—including numerous individuals on the continent and in the diaspora.

TrustAfrica's board and staff are all Africans. It maintains a website at http://www.trustafrica.org and a blog on African issues at http://blog.trustafrica.org.

In 2013, TrustAfrica released a groundbreaking work Giving to help, Helping to Give: The Context and Politics of African Philanthropy, edited by Tade Akin Aina and Bhekinkosi Moyo published by Amalion, Dakar, Senegal.
