= The Unwanteds =

Dystopian fantasy novel series by Lisa McMann

- The Unwanteds; Island of Silence; Island of Fire; Island of Legends; Island of Shipwrecks; Island of Graves; Island of Dragons; (Complete Collection ISBN 1481468863)
- Author: Lisa McMann
- Country: United States
- Language: English
- Genre: Fantasy, dystopia
- Publisher: Alladin
- Published: 2011–2016
- Media type: Print, digital, audio
- No. of books: 7
- Followed by: The Unwanteds Quests

The Unwanteds is a dystopian fantasy novel series by Lisa McMann.

== Plots ==
=== Book 1: The Unwanteds ===
In Quill, an annual tradition categorizes thirteen-year-olds into three groups: Wanted, Necessary, and Unwanted. Those designated as Wanted attend university, Necessaries work in agriculture, and Unwanteds, identified by artistic inclination, are executed into a lake of boiling oil.

Upon arrival at the destination where they expected to be eliminated, the Unwanteds discover a stunning secret—behind the mirage of the "death farm" there is instead a place called Artimé.

In Artimé, each child is taught to cultivate their creative abilities and learn how to use them magically, weaving spells through paintbrushes and musical instruments. Everything Alex has ever known changes before his eyes.

"In a rare departure from tradition, twins Alex and Aaron are separated during the Purge, assigned to the opposing factions of Artimé and Quill. Despite their isolation, a persistent bond remains between them. This connection eventually precipitates a conflict that threatens the existence of Artimé, culminating in a large-scale magical confrontation between the two societies."

=== Book 2: Island of Silence ===
Aaron Stowe has been kicked out of the University of Quill but is still power-hungry. Gathering a group of sympathizers named the Restorers, he plots his rise to power and the demise of Artimé.

Meanwhile, two silent, orange-eyed children, named Sky and Crow, have arrived on a raft. While Artimé seems to continue along normally, Eva Fathom, a supposed Restorer, is spying on Quill and passing along information to Sean Ranger, an Unwanted teenager. Mr. Today starts to teach Alex how to be a head mage, and devises a plan to trick Aaron. However, the plan backfires. Aaron confronts Mr. Today, and kills him using five heart-attack spells that Alex invented, thus depriving Artimé of its magic and leaving all magical components useless. Meanwhile, Alex and Simber, one of Mr. Today's statues, go out on a search for three of Alex's missing friends, Meghan Ranger, Samheed Burkesh, and Lani Haluki. They rescue Meghan and discover that Samheed and Lani have been captured by a neighboring, silent island, called Warbler. On the way back, Simber freezes due to Mr. Today's death and crashes into the sea. Alex and Meghan barely avoid death. At the same time, the Restorers attack Artimé, causing mass hysteria.

=== Book 3: Island of Fire ===
Appointed Head Mage by the late Mr. Today, Alex Stowe is left with the task of trying to bring back Artimé, the magical land that disappeared upon Mr. Today's death. If he can't, he and his friends are doomed. With the help of Sky, he succeeds in restoring Artimé, by using clues Mr. Today left him. He rescues his friends Lani and Samheed from Warbler Island, but Warbler's queen, Eagala, is planning an attack on them for stealing Sky, Crow, Lani, Samheed, and Meghan.

=== Book 4: Island of Legends ===
During Artimé's first annual masquerade ball, hundreds of lights appear across the sea. Warbler attacks Artimé, and with difficulty Alex and his friends drive them back. Meanwhile, Aaron discovers the existence of a magical jungle using Mr. Today's tube. The jungle creatures trust him after he tells them that he is Alex. He uses the creatures to plan an attack on Artimé.

Alex has not forgotten his promise to rescue Sky's mother from Pirate Island. Once they set out, however, some of their friends are taken to the island's underwater holding cell by a huge eel. When they rescue all of them, they proceed to the next islands, but find out not all of them are friendly. Karkinos, or the Island of Legends, is actually a moving crab who is dying. Talon, Lhasa, a snow lion, and Bock, a deer, are friendly, but there are some inhabitants of the islands who are hostile, like dropbears and the eel that attacked them. Alex and his friends befriend the eel by demonstrating their fighting abilities to each other. They sail on to the edge of the world.

=== Book 5: Island of Shipwrecks ===
Alex and his friends are stranded on an island beset by a constant storm after they fall off the waterfall in the Island of Legends. On this island, they meet three Japanese scientists, named Ishibashi, Ito, and Sato, who help them survive. They fix their boat and are able to escape. When they get back, they find that Artimé had been attacked when they were away, and Meghan had fought in it because she volunteered to stay behind. Samheed comes to help Meghan fight. Meghan then sacrifices herself to fight with General Blair, who miraculously survived the first attack. It is later revealed that he joined forces with High Priest Aaron Stowe. The pirates from the Island of Legends force a slave, who was good friends with Copper, Sky and Crow's mom, draw a picture of the person that helped Copper escape. They raid his palace on Artimé and mistakenly capture Aaron, Alex's twin. They learn that Aaron has sisters.

=== Book 6: Island of Graves ===
Aaron spends weeks in a small fishing boat tied to the back of the pirates' ship, until they untie the rope and send him in the direction of the Island of Shipwrecks. Fortunately, he arrives in the hour of calm, but has fainted from the near-death experience. He is then rescued by the scientists Ishibashi, Ito, and Sato. Ishibashi thinks he is Alex, and saves Aaron's life by giving him a piece of seaweed to eat that gives him eternal life. Aaron slowly matures and becomes less evil and greedy over the course of his marooning. In Aaron's absence, Gondoleery takes charge of Quill, and sends Liam and Alex's twin sisters to their deaths in the Ancient Sector. Liam escapes and brings the twins to Artimé. Lani then has the idea to rally the Necessaries against the new high priest, as she has started to kill Necessaries and Unwanteds that went to Quill in the last book. The only way they can succeed is to find and rescue Aaron. Alex and Sky search the islands for Aaron with Claire's help. Along the way, they meet a water dragon named Pan, the Queen of the Ocean. They reach the island where Alex had previously seen a sign asking for help, but now the sign has changed to "COME BACK". They wait for nightfall, when they hear a girl singing, telling them her story. Alex promises to save her on their way back. They find Aaron, rescue the girl and go back home. After rescuing her, they find Gondoleery Rattrap to be more tyrannical and cruel than they thought. The Artiméans prepare for war with the Quillens who fight for Gondoleery.

=== Book 7: Island of Dragons ===
Warbler and the Island of Fire forge an alliance in order to destroy Artimé, while Quill has been obliterated by the fireballs that Gondoleery Rattrap created. Artimé expands its magical boundaries to encompass the rest of the island in order to restore Quill. A traveler from the Island of Legends informs Artimé that Karkinos/the Island of Legends is on the verge of death and is drifting towards the waterfall. Henry Haluki takes the seaweed from the Island of Shipwrecks, which if consumed grants immortality, to the giant crab. Karkinos regains his strength and is able to muster the strength to back up to his original position. Meanwhile, Alex visits the Island of Dragons with the dragon Pan. Pan flies him over the colossal crystal wall surrounding the island, and behind the crystal wall are Pan's five children. Pan hid her children to protect them from the pirates, who capture sea creatures and cage them. Alex returns to Artimé to craft wings for the five dragons and returns to the island to attach them to their intended hosts. Warbler and the pirates launch their attack on Artimé. At the end of the war, Alex's left arm is damaged beyond repair, and since he is left-handed he cannot do magic anymore. However, he remains Head Mage of Artimé. Lani's legs become immobile, so Aaron designs her a machine to help her walk.

== Characters ==
=== Main protagonists ===
Alex Stowe - The main character. Twin brother to Aaron. He becomes a powerful fighter and is injured in the last book, leaving him unable to use his left arm.

Aaron - Alex's twin brother. Aaron is initially an antagonist but gradually comes to support Artimé. He helps the Unwanteds soon after being rescued by Alex on the Island of Shipwrecks. He later becomes Head Mage when Alex is killed by the Revinir.

Samheed Burkesh - A strong student who at first resents Alex, blaming him for his Unwanted designation, but eventually becomes his best friend. After Mr. Appleblossom is killed, he becomes the new theater instructor.

Lani Haluki - The child of Senior Governor Haluki, a double agent. Younger than the others, Lani was Purged when she was only 12 years old. She is resentful of this fact until she learns her father, already knowing about Artimé, had it done to get her out of Quill. She is interested in books and one of Artimé's finest students. Alex falls for her in the first book. After the final battle, she is disabled and unable to use her lower body.

Marcus Today - The Head Mage and creator of Artimé. Mr. Today created Artimé and its magical creatures to save his daughter and the other young Unwanteds from death. He is also the twin of the evil High Priest Justine. Mr. Today is killed by Aaron, Alex's twin brother.

Claire Morning - Mr. Today's daughter and singing instructor of Artimé. She is kidnapped by Aaron Stowe in the second book after she saw her father die.

Simber - An animated statue of a winged cheetah made of hardened sand. Simber is one of the protectors of Artimé, and is loyal to the head mage. He was the first statue Mr. Today created. He is only able to be defeated by blue or white fire.

Florence - An animated statue of a warrior made of ebony, who also protects Artimé. Near the end of the series she falls for a winged, bronze man named Talon.

Meghan Ranger - One of Alex's friends who loves music and singing. She dies defending Artimé.

Mr. Sigfried Appleblossom - Artimé's theater instructor. He always attempts to talk in iambic pentameter and rhyme every sentence. He dies in the seventh book. He is like a father to Samheed Burkesh.

Sky - A girl from Warbler Island who Alex falls for. Aaron also falls for her in the third book after he gets into Artimé and sees her pacing anxiously waiting for Alex.

Crow - Sky's little brother and a friend of Henry Haluki.

Henry Haluki - Crow's friend and Lani's little brother. He was the first one to know Crow's and Sky's names. He later becomes Chief Healer.

Kaylee Jones - A girl from our world, who stumbles into theirs from what she said was the Dragon's Triangle. She used to live on the Island of Graves before she was saved by Alex, Sky, and Aaron after Alex and Sky rescued Aaron from the Island of Shipwrecks.

Ito - A scientist from the Island of Shipwrecks who came from Japan.

Sato - Another scientist on the Island of Shipwrecks who also came from Japan.

Ishibashi Junpei - The last scientist from the Island of Shipwrecks who also came from Japan. He speaks English, unlike Ito and Sato.

=== Main antagonists ===
High Priest Justine - The High Priestess of Quill. Lani kills her in the battle between Quill and Artime. She is also Marcus' evil twin.

Gondoleery - The new High Priestess of Quill after Aaron is kidnapped by pirates from the Island of Shipwrecks in the fifth book. Aaron kills her with a deadly scatter clip.

Queen Eagala - The queen of Warbler. She falls into a volcano and is presumed dead, but reappears in Dragon Captives under the name "the Revinir".

=== Secondary characters ===
Eva Fathom - Mother of Carina Fathom, secretary to Aaron and a spy for Artimé.

Copper - Sky and Crow's mother who was saved from Pirate Island and later becomes the Queen of Warbler Island.

Scarlet - A Warbleran that escaped the first time Warbler attacked Artimé. She is a seasoned fighter and Crow has a crush on her.

Thatcher - Another Warbleran that escaped the first time Warbler attacked Artimé. He is a seasoned fighter and has a friendship with Scarlet.

Thisbe Stowe - Alex's sister and Fifer's twin.

Fifer Stowe - Alex's other sister and Thisbe's twin.

Spike Furious - An intuitive whale that Alex creates.

Carina Holiday - Daughter of Eva Fathom. Formerly Carina Fathom.

Seth Holiday - Son of Carina Holiday and a friend of Fifer and Thisbe.

== Reception ==
In a review by Caitlen Rubino for Kirkus Reviews, The Unwanteds is described as a cross between The Hunger Games and Harry Potter.
