= Island of Silence =

2011 novel by Lisa McMann

Island Of Silence
- First edition
- Author: Lisa McMann
- Language: English
- Genre: Fantasy
- Publisher: Aladdin Paperbacks
- Publication place: United States
- Media type: Print, digital, audio
- Pages: 390
- ISBN: 978-1442407688
- OCLC: 693810559
- LC Class: PZ7.M478757 Unw 2011
- Preceded by: The Unwanteds
- Followed by: Island Of Fire

Island Of Silence is a fantasy book meant for readers ages 8–15. It is the second book in The Unwanteds series, preceded by the first book, The Unwanteds.

== Plot ==
One day, two silent, orange-eyed teenagers, named Sky and Crow, have arrived on a raft. While Artimé seems to continue along normally, Eva Fathom, a supposed Restorer, is spying on Quill and passing along information to Sean Ranger. Mr. Today starts to teach Alex how to be a head mage, and devises a plan to trick Aaron. The plan backfires. Aaron confronts Mr. Today and kills him using five heart-attack spells that Alex invented, thus destroying Artimé.

Meanwhile, Alex and Simber, one of Mr. Today's statues, go out on a search for three of Alex's missing friends, Meghan Ranger, Samheed Burkesh and Lani Haluki. They rescue Meghan and discover that Samheed and Lani have been captured by a neighboring island, Warbler. On the way back, Simber freezes and crashes into the sea. Alex and Meghan barely avoid death. At the same time, the Restorers attack Artimé and cause chaos. High Priest Haluki gets captured, along with Mr. Today's daughter, Claire Morning, by the Restorers. Aaron becomes Associate High Priest (aka High Priest in disguise), and plans to destroy Artimé.
