= Lisa McMann =

American author

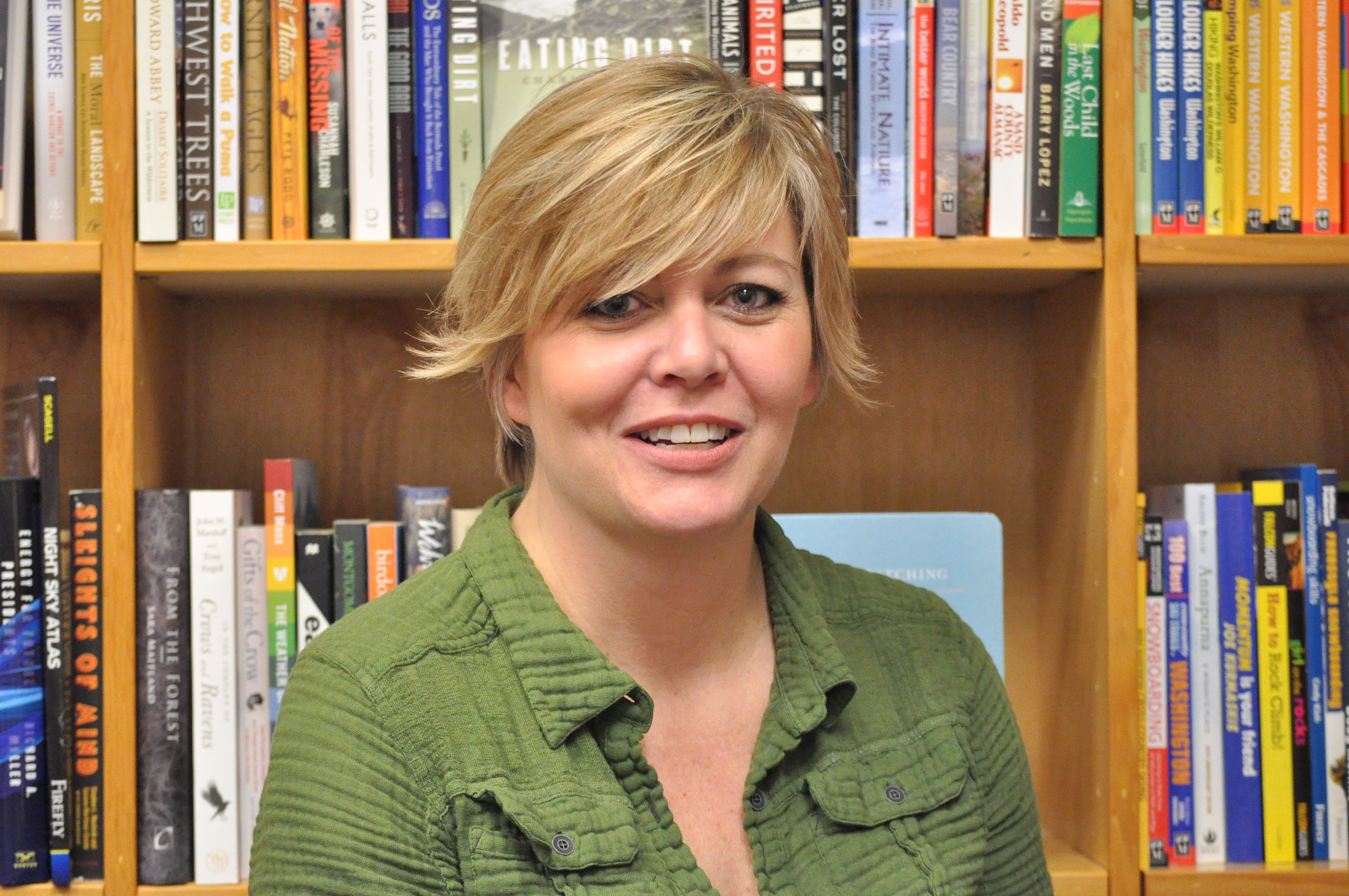
- Lisa McMann 2011
- Born: Lisa Dawn Gort; February 27, 1968 (age 58); Holland, Michigan, U.S.
- Education: Calvin College
- Occupation: Novelist
- Spouse: Matt McMann (m. 1991)
- Children: 2, including Kennedy McMann
- Writing career
- Period: 2007–present
- Genre: Young adult fantasy
- Website: www.lisamcmann.com

Lisa McMann (born February 27, 1968) is an American author and the creator of The Unwanteds and The Unwanteds Quests series for young readers and the WAKE trilogy for young adults.

== Biography ==
McMann was born Lisa Dawn Gort on February 27, 1968 in Holland, Michigan to Glenda (née Bouwer; born 1940) and Morris G. Gort (1939–2023). She graduated from Calvin College in 1990. Her first novel, WAKE, debuted on the New York Times Best Seller list for children's chapter books. She is also the author of FADE, which debuted on the New York Times best-seller list and remained there eleven weeks, and of GONE, the last book in the WAKE series, which was released February 2010.

McMann has published many short stories, including the creative nonfiction essay, "When You're Ten", featured in Literary Mama, and the award-winning short story, "The Day of the Shoes", in 2004. One year later, her story, "Like Waves on Rocks" was published in the Gator Springs Gazette. McMann's short stories are written for adult audiences while her novels are intended for young adults.

== Awards ==
- "The Day of the Shoes" (short story): 2004 Templeton International Power of Purpose Award
- WAKE: American Library Association 2009 Top Ten Quick Picks for Reluctant Young Adult Readers
- WAKE: 2008 Cybil Award Finalist
- WAKE: Abraham Lincoln Book Award Master List (IL)
- WAKE: Garden State Teen Book Award Nominee (NJ)
- WAKE: Gateway Readers Award Nominee (MO)
- WAKE: Georgia Peach Book Award Master List
- WAKE: IRA Young Adults' Choices
- WAKE: Nevada Young Reader's Award Nominee
- WAKE: Texas Tayshas Reading List
- WAKE: Young Adult Reading Program Reading List Selection (SD)
- Cryer's Cross: American Library Association 2012 Best Fiction for Young Adults
- Cryer's Cross: American Library Association 2012 Quick Picks for Reluctant Young Readers
- Dead to You: American Library Association 2013 Quick Picks for Reluctant Young Readers
- Dead to You: IRA Young Adults' Choices
- The Unwanteds: Maine Student Book Award Master Listt
- The Unwanteds: North Carolina Young Adult Book Award Nomineet
- The Unwanteds: Truman Reader Award Nominee (MO)t
- Crash: American Library Association 2014 Quick Picks for Reluctant Young Readers
- Crash: MSTA Reading Circle List
- Bang: MSTA Reading Circle List

== Published works ==
=== Wake trilogy ===
- WAKE (2008)
- FADE (2009)
- GONE (2010)

=== The Unwanteds ===
- The Unwanteds (2011)
- The Unwanteds: Island of Silence (2012)
- The Unwanteds: Island of Fire (2013)
- The Unwanteds: Island of Legends (2014)
- The Unwanteds: Island of Shipwrecks (2015)
- The Unwanteds: Island of Graves (2015)
- The Unwanteds: Island of Dragons (2016)

=== The Unwanteds Quests ===
- The Unwanteds Quests: Dragon Captives (2017)
- The Unwanteds Quests: Dragon Bones (2018)
- The Unwanteds Quests: Dragon Ghosts (2019)
- The Unwanteds Quests: Dragon Curse (2019)
- The Unwanteds Quests: Dragon Fire (2020)
- The Unwanteds Quests: Dragon Slayers (2020)
- The Unwanteds Quests: Dragon Fury (2021)

=== Visions trilogy ===
- Crash (2013)
- Bang (2013)
- Gasp (2014)

=== Going Wild series ===
- Going Wild (2016)
- Predator Vs. Prey (2017)
- Clash of Beasts (2018)

=== Forgotten Five series ===
- The Forgotten Five: Map of Flames (2022)
- The Forgotten Five: The Invisible Spy (2022)
- The Forgotten Five: Rebel Undercover (2023)
- The Forgotten Five: Dangerous Allies (2024)
- The Forgotten Five: Operation Chaos (2025)
- The Forgotten Five: Masters of Disguise (2025)

=== Other books ===
- Cryer's Cross (2011)
- Dear Bully: Seventy Authors Tell Their Stories (2011)
- Dead To You (2012)
- The Trap Door (Infinity Ring #3) (2013)
- Clarice the Brave (2021)

== WAKE trilogy translations ==
The WAKE trilogy has been translated into the following languages (note: not all of the books are out in these countries):

- Novo Seculo / Portuguese (Brazil only)
- Wisdom Distribution Service / Chinese (complex)
- Kelly Kiado / Hungarian
- Newton Compton / Italian
- Everest / Spanish
- Atlin Kitaplar / Turkish
- Patakis / Greek
- PT Gramedia / Indonesian
- Amarin / Thai
- Boje Verlag / German
- WYDAWNICTWO / Polish
- Everest Editora / Portuguese (Portugal)

== Personal life ==
Lisa married fellow writer and musician Matt McMann on May 31, 1991. Together they have two children, a son who is an artist named Kilian McMann (b. 1993) and a daughter who is an actress named Kennedy McMann (b. 1996). Kennedy was cast in Nancy Drew as the titular character, in a CW series. They currently live in Tempe, Arizona.
