= Windward Heights =

1995 novel by Maryse Condé

- First edition
- Author: Maryse Condé
- Original title: La migration des coeurs
- Translator: Richard Philcox
- Language: French
- Publisher: Éditions Robert Laffont
- Publication date: 24 August 1995
- English publication date: 1 August 1998 (Soho Press)
- Media type: Print (hardback & paperback)
- Pages: 352 pp.
- Preceded by: The New World Colony
- Followed by: Desirada

Windward Heights (French: La migration des cœurs, lit. The Migration of Hearts) is a novel by French author Maryse Condé, written in French and first published in 1995 by Robert Laffont. The English translation, by Condé's husband Richard Philcox, was first published in 1998. Set in Cuba and Guadeloupe at the turn of the twentieth century, the novel is a reworking of Emily Brontë's Wuthering Heights (1847).

== Title ==
In French, Condé's novel is entitled La Migration des cœurs (literally 'the migration of the hearts'). Speaking in 2016 to Françoise Pfaff, Condé explained the title thus: "J'ai vu dans ce titre une manière d'exprimer que l'histoire se répétait; il y avait une première génération avec Cathy qui était aimée par Razyé et par de Linsseuil et une deuxième génération avec Cathy II, fille de Cathy, aimée par Premier-né" ("I saw in this title a way of expressing how history repeats itself; there was a first generation with Cathy who was loved both by Razyé and by de Linsseuil, and a second generation with Cathy II, daughter of Cathy, loved by Premier-né").

== Style ==
In the original, Windward Heights is predominantly written in standard French, but characteristed by Condé's characteristic blending of French with Guadeloup creole, with no explication for the reader. Condé, opposed to thinking of the French language as immutable, likewise opposed the idea that a ready distinction can be drawn between standard French and creole. In a 2016 interview, she argued that "Il n'y pas le français. Il y a le français's de Proust, de Chateaubriand, de Maryse Condé. J'ai dit clairement par la suite: 'Je n'écris ni en français, ni en créole, j'écris en Maryse Condé.' C'était une réponse aux angoisses que j'avais connues d'utiliser une langue qui ne m'appartient pas. Le français et le créole appartiennent à ceux qui les utilisent" ("There is no French. There is the French of Proust, of Chateaubriand, of Maryse Condé. I have said clearly later: "I do not write neither in French nor in Creole, I write in Maryse Condé.' It was a response to the anxieties I had to use a language that does not belong to me. French and Creole belong to those who use them").

Examples include:

- "Il lui traitait comme un jouet. Il lui appartenait, avec toutes les qualités des gros mots, les biguines les plus obscènes. Il se tordait à le voir danser en fretillant du bonda ou en pointant son sexe. Il l'encourageait à se déguiser en mas'à kongo ou en mas'à goudron."
- "Elle se levait en fredonnant tel ou tel air de biguine. C'étaient des Ban mwen an ti bo ou des Doudou ki jou? pas jodi la!"
- "Justin se tourna vers Razyé et lui cria comme à un chien: Dèro! Déro, mwen di-w! Mache!"
- Ce procédé relève d'une volonté de "dépayser le lecteur qui se rappelle que c'est une histoire guadeloupéenne à travers les sons, les métaphores, les images."

== Summary ==
Windward Heights was inspired by Emily Brontë's Wuthering Heights, and Condé described the work as a homage to Brontë. It transposes the Yorkshire moors in the island of Guadeloupe. Thus, she retains the characters of Cathy and Heathcliffe (who becomes Razyé) but transposes them into a Creole identity. The Linton family becomes the "De Linsseuil" family, who live on the Belles-Feuilles estate (and no longer Thrushcross Grange as in English), and the Earnshaw family becomes the Gagneur family who inhabit the Engoulevent estate (like Wuthering Heights in English). As a result, The Migration of Hearts can be considered a postcolonial rewriting.

The novel comprises 41 chapters and is divided into five parts, each of which represent one of the islands (Cuba, Basse-Terre, Marie-Galante, Roseau) where the story takes place.

Maryse Condé remains faithful to Brontë's novel by telling the story of Razyé's revenge on the Linnseuil family. But, unlike Bronte's story, Conde makes sure that Cathy and Razyé have a child, Cathy II. The secret of this liaison is always kept and it is because of this that Cathy II and Razyé II marry: driven by an inexplicable love, they are attracted to each other. As a result of their affair, they also have a child, a little girl named Anthuria.

Razyé II and Cathy II take refuge in Roseau and it is only after the death of Cathy II that Razyé II returns to the Engoulevent estate with his daughter.

=== Main characters ===
- Anthuria: daughter of Cathy II and Razyé II. This character does not exist in Brontë's text.
- Aymeric: husband of Cathy, taking on the character of Brontë's Egar Linton.
- Cathy: the lover of Razyé. Often characterized as a wild girl by her family, she is married to Aymeric. She is Cathy in Brontë's text and nicknamed "Man Razyé", which is Creole for "Mrs. Razyé", in Condé's text.
- Cathy II: daughter of Cathy and Razyé, the wife of Razyé II.
- Irmine Linsseuil: wife of Razyé, taking on the character of Isabel Linton in the text of Brontë.
- Justin-Marie: Gegneur's child, he takes over Hindley's character in Bronte's text.
- Razyé: a child found by Hubert Gagneur, but considered natural child in Condé's text. He takes on the character of Heathcliff in the English novel. Condé selected Razyé's name as a wild plant of Guadeloupe, echoing how the name Heathcliff alludes to the Yorkshire Moors in England.
- Razyé II, or Premier-né ('firstborn'): child of Razyé and his wife, Irmine Linsseuil. He is the husband of Cathy II, who is also his half sister.

== Inspirations ==
Alongside Wuthering Heights, Condé invoked the work of Jean Rhys as an inspiration, particular her 1966 novel Wide Sargasso Sea (based on Charlotte Brontë's 1847 Jane Eyre).

== Reception ==
Kirkus Reviews concluded that Windward Heights was "one of its author's most involving and satisfying novels". It was selected by Elaine Castillo as one of "10 Overlooked Yet Essential Novels".
