= Pierre Jarawan =

German-Lebanese writer (born 1985)

Pierre Jarawan is a German-Lebanese writer. He was born in Amman, Jordan in 1985 and moved to Germany with his family at the age of three. He started writing as a teenager, inspired by the bedtime stories his father had told him as a child. He has since gained renown as a poetry slammer and a novelist. His books include The Storyteller and Song for the Missing. He won a literary scholarship from the City of Munich (the Bayerischer Kunstförderpreis) for The Storyteller.

He lives in Munich.

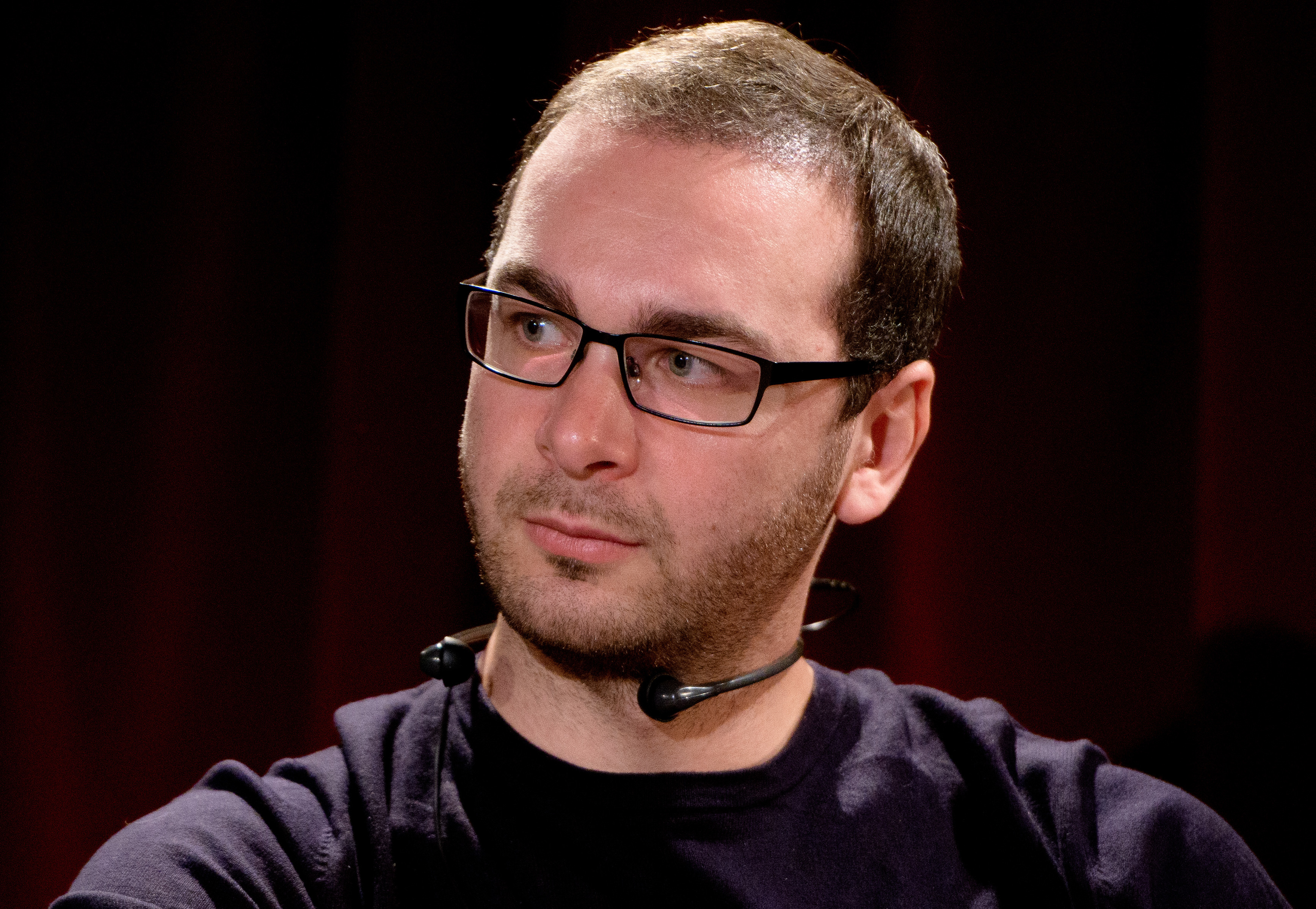
Pierre Jarawan, is a German-Lebanese writer.
