= Segu (novel) =

1984 novel by Maryse Condé

- First edition
- Author: Maryse Condé
- Original title: Ségou: les murailles de terre
- Translator: Barbara Bray
- Language: French
- Publisher: Éditions Robert Laffont
- Publication date: 1 May 1984
- English publication date: 11 March 1987 (Viking Press); 12 March 1988 (Ballantine Books); 3 September 1998 (Penguin Books)
- Media type: Print (hardback & paperback)
- Pages: 492 pp. (Robert Laffont); 480 pp. (Viking Press)
- Preceded by: A Season in Rihata
- Followed by: The Children of Segu

Segu: A Novel (French: Ségou: les murailles de terre, lit. Segu: The Earthern Wall) is a French novel by Maryse Condé published in May 1984. It was Condé's third novel. Set in historical Ségou (now part of Mali), it is an African saga that examines the violent impact of the slave trade, Islam, Christianity, and white colonization on a royal family during the period from 1797 to 1860. The book won the Liberatur Prize in 1988.

== Synopsis ==
Set in 1797, Segu follows the life of Dousika Traore the king's most trusted advisor, and his four sons, whose fates embody the forces tearing at the fabric of the nation. The eldest of Traore's sons, Tiekoro, renounces his people's religion and embraces Islam; Siga defends tradition, but becomes a merchant; Naba is kidnapped by slave traders; and Malobali becomes a mercenary and halfhearted Christian.

== Reviews ==
Segu, as well as its sequel, The Children of Segu, received positive review coverage.

The New York Times regarded the novel as "the most significant novel about black Africa published in many a year."

American writer Paule Marshall praised the novel, saying: "With the dazzling storytelling skills of an African griot, Condé has written a rich, fast-paced saga of a great kingdom during the tumultuous period of the slave trade and the coming of Islam. Segu is history as vivid and immediate as today. It has restored a part of my past that has long been missing."

Novelist Louise Meriwether commented: "Segu is an overwhelming accomplishment. It injects into the density of history characters who are as alive as you and I. Passionate, lusty, greedy, they are in conflict with themselves as well as with God and Mammon. Condé has done us all a tremendous service by rendering a history so compelling and exciting. Segu is a literary masterpiece I could not put down."
