= Maryse Condé =

French Guadeloupean author (1934–2024)

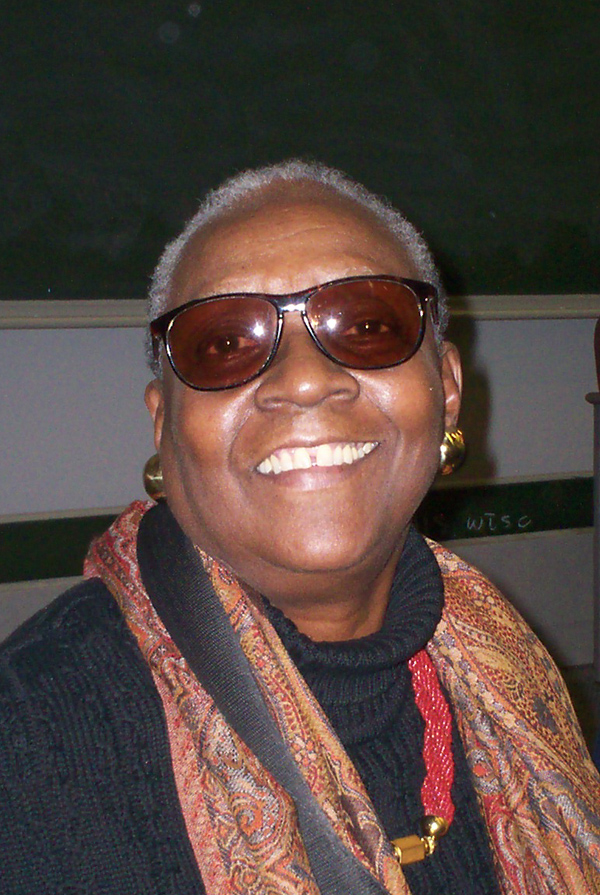
- Condé in 2006
- Born: Marise Liliane Appoline Boucolon; 11 February 1934; Pointe-à-Pitre, Guadeloupe, France
- Died: 2 April 2024 (aged 90); Apt, Vaucluse, France
- Education: Sorbonne Nouvelle
- Occupations: Novelist, critic, playwright, and academic
- Spouse(s): Mamadou Condé; Richard Philcox
- Writing career
- Language: French
- Notable works: Ségou (1984); The Gospel According to the New World (2023)
- Notable awards: Grand prix littéraire de la Femme (1986); Prix de l'Académie française (1988); Prix Carbet de la Caraïbe (1997); Hurston/Wright Legacy Award; New Academy Prize in Literature (2018)

Maryse Condé (née Marise Liliane Appoline Boucolon; 11 February 1934 – 2 April 2024) was a French novelist, critic, and playwright from the French Overseas department and region of Guadeloupe. She was also an academic, whose teaching career took her to West Africa and North America, as well as the Caribbean and Europe. As a writer, Condé is best known for her novel Ségou (1984–1985).

Condé's writings explore the African diaspora that resulted from slavery and colonialism in the Caribbean. Her novels, written in French, have been translated into English, German, Dutch, Italian, Spanish, Portuguese, and Japanese. She won various awards, such as the Grand Prix Littéraire de la Femme (1986), Prix de l'Académie française (1988), Prix Carbet de la Caraïbe (1997) and the New Academy Prize in Literature (2018) for her works. She was considered a strong contender for the Nobel Prize in Literature.

== Early life ==
Born in Pointe-à-Pitre, Guadeloupe, on 11 February 1934, she was the youngest of eight children. Her parents were among the first black instructors in Guadeloupe. Her mother, Jeanne Quidal (who was from Marie-Galante, an island which would often feature in Condé's creative writing), directed her own school for girls. Her father, Auguste Boucolon – previously an educator – founded the small bank "La Caisse Coopérative des prêts", which was later renamed "La Banque Antillaise."

Condé's father, Auguste Boucolon, had two sons from his first marriage: Serge and Albert. Condé's three sisters were Ena, Jeanne, and Gillette, and her brothers were Auguste, Jean, René, and Guy. Condé was born 11 years after Guy, when her mother was 43, and her father 63. Condé described herself as "the spoiled child", which she attributed to her parents' older age, as well as the age-gap between her and her siblings.

Condé began writing at an early age. Before she was 12 years old, she had written a one-act, one-person play. The play was written as a gift for her mother's birthday.

After having graduated from high school, Condé attended Lycée Fénelon from 1953 to 1955, being expelled after two years of attendance. She furthered her studies at the Université de Paris III (Sorbonne Nouvelle) in Paris. During her attendance, along with other West Indians, Condé established the Luis-Carlos Prestes club.

== Career ==
In 1958, Condé attended a rehearsal in Paris of Les Nègres/The Blacks by Jean Genet, where she met the Guinean actor Mamadou Condé. In August 1958, she married Mamadou Condé. They eventually had three children together before separating in 1969 (Condé already had one child from Haitian journalist Jean Dominique). By November 1959, the couple's relationship had already become strained, and Condé decided to go alone to the Ivory Coast, where she taught for a year in Bingerville.

During her returns to Guinea for the holidays, she became politically conscious through a group of Marxist friends, who would influence her to move to Ghana. It was for her a turbulent but formative time that she would later chronicle in her 2012 book La Vie sans fards (What Is Africa to Me? Fragments of a True-to-Life Autobiography), as in the recently independent West African countries she rubbed shoulders with the likes of Malcolm X, Che Guevara, Julius Nyerere and Maya Angelou.

Between the years 1960 and 1972, she taught in Guinea, Ghana and Senegal. While in Ghana, she edited a collection of francophone African literature, Anthologie de la literature africaine d'expression française (Ghana Institute of Languages, 1966). However, she became disillusioned with being "witness to many contradictory events", and accusations against her of suspected subversive activity resulted in Condé's deportation from Ghana.

After leaving West Africa, she worked in London as a BBC producer for two years. Then in 1973, she returned to Paris and taught Francophone literature at Paris VII (Jussieu), X (Nanterre), and Ill (Sorbonne Nouvelle). In 1975, she completed her M.A. and Ph.D. at the Sorbonne Nouvelle in Paris in comparative literature, examining black stereotypes in Caribbean literature. She was the author of works of criticism that included Le profil d'une oeuvre (Hatier, 1978), La Civilisation du Bossale (L'Harmattan, 1978), and La Parole des femmes (L'Harmattan, 1979).

In 1981, she and Condé divorced, having long been separated. The following year, she married Richard Philcox, an Englishman and the English-language translator of most of her novels.

She did not publish her first novel, Hérémakhonon, until she was nearly 40, as "[she] didn't have confidence in [herself] and did not dare present [her] writing to the outside world." Her second novel, Une saison à Rihata, was published in 1981; however, Condé would not reach prominence as a contemporary Caribbean writer until the publication of her third novel, Ségou (1984).

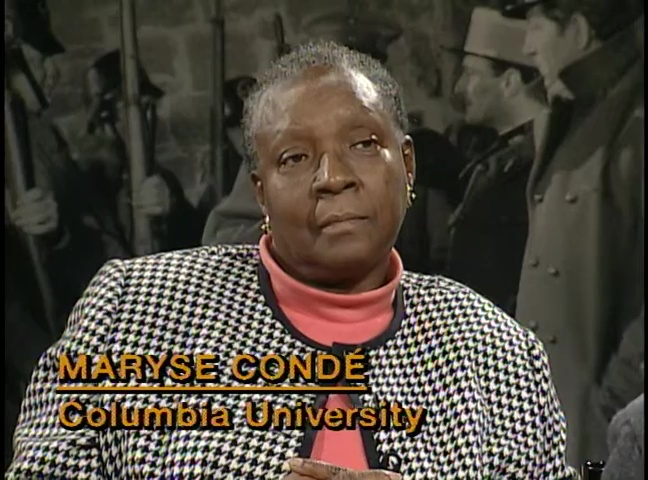
Condé on CUNY TV's City Cinematheque, 1999

Following the success of Ségou, in 1985, Condé was awarded a Fulbright scholarship to the United States to teach "Literature and Culture of the Caribbean" at Occidental College, Los Angeles (September 1985–May 1986). In 1987, she was a Rockefeller Foundation Bellagio writer-in-residence, and she was also awarded a Guggenheim Foundation Fellowship. In 1991, her play The Hills of Massabielle was staged in New York at the Ubu Repertory Theater. She was included in the 1992 anthology Daughters of Africa, edited by Margaret Busby. In 1995, Condé became a professor of French and Francophone literature at Columbia University in New York City, where she was subsequently professor emerita.

Condé taught at various universities, including the University of California, Berkeley; UCLA, the Sorbonne, the University of Virginia, and the University of Nanterre. She retired from teaching in 2005.

She is the subject of the 2011 documentary film Maryse Condé, une voix singulière, directed by Jérôme Sesquin, which retraces her life.

In 2011, Collège Maryse-Condé on the island of La Désirade was inaugurated in her honour.

== Death ==
Condé died in Apt, Vaucluse, southeastern France, on 2 April 2024, at the age of 90.

== Literary significance ==
Condé's novels explore racial, gender, and cultural issues in a variety of historical eras and locales, including the Salem witch trials in I, Tituba: Black Witch of Salem (1986); the 19th-century Bambara Empire of Mali in Ségou (1984–1985); and the 20th-century building of the Panama Canal and its influence on increasing the West Indian middle class in Tree of Life (1987). Her novels trace the relationships between African peoples and the diaspora, especially the Caribbean. As Louise Hardwick observes, "Cosmopolitan in nature, Condé’s literature tackles the complexities of a globalised world in an unmistakably frank voice. She rejected attempts to pigeonhole her style, or labels describing her as a French or Creole writer," and she was often quoted as stating: "I write in Maryse Condé."

Her first novel, Hérémakhonon (in the Malinke language, the title means "waiting for happiness"), was published in 1976. It was so controversial that it was pulled from the shelves after six months because of its criticism over the success of African socialism. While the story closely parallels Condé's own life during her first stay in Guinea, and is written as a first-person narrative, she stressed that it is not an autobiography. The book is the story, as she described it, of an "'anti-moi', an ambiguous persona whose search for identity and origins is characterized by a rebellious form of sexual libertinage".

Condé kept considerable distance from most Caribbean literary movements, such as Négritude and Creolité, and often focused on topics with strong feminist and political concerns. A radical activist in her work as well as in her personal life, Condé admitted: "I could not write anything... unless it has a certain political significance. I have nothing else to offer that remains important."

Her 1995 novel Windward Heights is a reworking of Emily Brontë's Wuthering Heights (1847), which Condé had first read at the age of 14. She had long wanted to create a work of her own around it, as an act of "homage". Condé's novel is set in Guadeloupe, and race and culture are featured as issues that divide people. Reflecting on how she drew from her Caribbean background in writing this book, she said:

"To be part of so many worlds – part of the African world because of the African slaves, part of the European world because of the European education – is a kind of double entendre. You can use that in your own way and give sentences another meaning. I was so pleased when I was doing that work, because it was a game, a kind of perverse but joyful game."

Condé's later writings include the autobiographical Tales From the Heart: True Stories From My Childhood (1999), a collection of essays about her childhood, and Victoire (2006), a fictional biography of her maternal grandmother during a period when the black population of Guadeloupe asserted their rights to education and political power.

Who Slashed Celanire's Throat (2000) was inspired by a true story and uses a blend of magical realism and fantasy in a novel about a woman who wants to uncover the truth of her past and avenge her childhood mutilation.

The 2017 translation by Richard Philcox of Condé's What Is Africa to Me? Fragments of a True-to-Life Autobiography was described by Noo Saro-Wiwa in a review for The Times Literary Supplement as "refreshingly frank ... an entertaining and occasionally humorous account of the twelve years the author spent in Africa during the late 1950s and 60s. ... and by the book's end the author concedes that she still doesn't know what Africa means to her – a brave admission in a world that hankers for defined narrative arcs."

In 2018, Condé was awarded the New Academy Prize in Literature, established as a one-off alternative to the Nobel Prize in Literature (for which she was often considered a favourite but which was not awarded that year, as a consequence of a sexual abuse scandal among the award committee), with the jury praising Condé as a "grand storyteller whose authorship belongs to world literature, describing the ravages of colonialism and the postcolonial chaos in a language which is both precise and overwhelming."

In 2022, she was honoured as one of 12 Royal Society of Literature International Writers, alongside Anne Carson, Tsitsi Dangarembga, Cornelia Funke, Mary Gaitskill, Faïza Guène, Saidiya Hartman, Kim Hyesoon, Yōko Ogawa, Raja Shehadeh, Juan Gabriel Vásquez and Samar Yazbek.

Condé's 2023 novel, The Gospel According to the New World, was longlisted for the International Booker Prize and, at the age of 86, she was the oldest writer ever to be longlisted for the prize. The creation of the novel was by means of dictation to her husband and translator Richard Philcox, as she had a degenerative neurological disorder that made it difficult to speak and see. Together, they were the first wife-and-husband author-translator team to be longlisted, and subsequently shortlisted, for the award.

=== Archives ===
Maryse Condé's literary archives (Maryse Condé papers, 1979–2012) are held at Columbia University Libraries.

== Selected bibliography ==
=== Novels ===
Original publication		English publication				
Title	Year	Title	Translator	Year	Publisher	Notes/References
Hérémakhonon	1976	Heremakhonon	Richard Philcox	1982	Three Continents Press	
Une saison à Rihata	1981	A Season in Rihata	Richard Philcox	1988	Heinemann	
Ségou: les murailles de terre (lit: "Segu: The Earthen Wall")	1984	Segu	Barbara Bray	1987	Viking Press	
Ségou: les murailles de terre (lit: "Segu: The Earthen Wall")	1984	Segu	Barbara Bray	1988	Ballantine Books	
Ségou: les murailles de terre (lit: "Segu: The Earthen Wall")	1984	Segu	Barbara Bray	1998	Penguin Books	
Ségou: la terre en miettes (lit: "Segu: The Earth in Pieces")	1985	The Children of Segu	Linda Coverdale	1989	Viking Press	
Ségou: la terre en miettes (lit: "Segu: The Earth in Pieces")	1985	The Children of Segu	Linda Coverdale	1990	Ballantine Books	
Moi, Tituba, Sorcière…Noire de Salem	1986	I, Tituba: Black Witch of Salem	Richard Philcox	1992, 2009	University of Virginia Press	
Moi, Tituba, Sorcière…Noire de Salem	1986	I, Tituba: Black Witch of Salem	Richard Philcox	1994	Ballantine Books	
La Vie scélérate (lit: "The Wicked Life")	1987	Tree of Life: A Novel of the Caribbean	Victoria Reiter	1992	Ballantine Books	
Traversée de la mangrove	1989	Crossing the Mangrove	Richard Philcox	1995	Anchor Books	
Les Derniers rois mages (lit: "The Last Magi")	1992	The Last of the African Kings	Richard Philcox	1997	University of Nebraska Press	
La Colonie du nouveau monde (lit: "The New World Colony")	1993	—N/a	—N/a	—N/a	—N/a	
La Migration des cœurs (lit: "The Migration of Hearts")	1995	Windward Heights	Richard Philcox	1998	Soho Press	
Desirada	1997	Desirada	Richard Philcox	2000	Soho Press	
Célanire cou-coupé (lit: "Slashed-Throat Célanire")	2000	Who Slashed Celanire's Throat?	Richard Philcox	2004	Atria Publishing Group	
La Belle créole (lit: "The Beautiful Créole")	2001	The Belle Créole	Nicole Simek	2020	University of Virginia Press	
Histoire de la femme cannibale	2003	The Story of the Cannibal Woman	Richard Philcox	2007	Atria Publishing Group	
Les Belles ténébreuses (lit: "The Dark Beauties")	2008	—N/a	—N/a	—N/a	—N/a	
En attendant la montée des eaux	2010	Waiting for the Waters to Rise	Richard Philcox	2021	World Editions	
Le Fabuleux et triste destin d'Ivan et d'Ivana	2017	The Wondrous and Tragic Life of Ivan and Ivana	Richard Philcox	2020	World Editions	
L'Évangile du nouveau monde	2021	The Gospel According to the New World	Richard Philcox	2023	World Editions	

=== Plays ===
- An Tan Révolisyion, published in 1991, first performed in Guadeloupe in 1989
- Comédie d'Amour, first performed in Paris in 1993
- Dieu nous l'a donné, published in 1972, first performed in Paris in 1973
- La Mort d'Oluwémi d'Ajumako, published in 1973, first performed in 1974 in Gabon
- Le Morne de Massabielle, first version staged in 1974 in Puteaux, France, later staged in English in New York as The Hills of Massabielle at the Ubu Repertory Theater (1991)
- Les Sept voyages de Ti-Noël (written in collaboration with José Jernidier), first performed in Guadeloupe in 1987
- Pension les Alizés, published in 1988, first staged in Guadeloupe and subsequently staged in New York as Tropical Breeze Hotel (1995)
- Comme deux frères (2007). Like Two Brothers.

=== Criticism and other non-fiction ===
- "Three Female Writers in Modern Africa : Flora Nwapa, Ama Ata Aidoo and Grace Ogot" (1972), Présence Africaine, 82:132–143.
- Le profil d'une oeuvre, Hatier, 1978
- La Civilisation du Bossale: Réflexions sur la littérature orale de la Guadeloupe et de la Martinique, Paris: L'Harmattan, 1978
- La Parole des femmes: Essai sur des romancières des Antilles de langue française., Paris: L'Harmattan, 1979
- Entretiens avec Maryse Condé (1993). Conversations with Maryse Condé (1996). Interviews with Françoise Pfaff. English translation includes a new chapter based on a 1994 interview.
- "The Role of the Writer" (1993), World Literature Today, 67(4): 697–699.
- Le cœur à rire et à pleurer : souvenirs de mon enfance (1999). Tales From the Heart: True Stories From My Childhood, trans. Richard Philcox (2001).
- "Order, Disorder, Freedom, and the West Indian Writer" (2000), Yale French Studies 97: 151.
- Victoire, les saveurs et les mots (2006). Victoire: My Mother's Mother, trans. Richard Philcox (2006).
- La Vie sans fards (2012). What Is Africa to Me? Fragments of a True-to-Life Autobiography, trans. Richard Philcox (2017).
- The Journey of a Caribbean Writer (2013). Collection of essays, trans. Richard Philcox.
- Mets et merveilles (2015). Of Morsels and Marvels, trans. Richard Philcox (2015).

=== As editor ===
- Anthologie de la littérature africaine d'expression française. Ghana Institute of Languages, 1966.
- La Poésie antillaise. Paris: Nathan, 1977.
- Le Roman antillais. Paris: Nathan, 1977.
- Bouquet de voix pour Guy Tirolien (also contributor). Pointe-à-Pitre: Editions Jasor, 1990.
- Caliban's Legacy, special issue of Callaloo on literature of Guadeloupe and Martinique, 1992.
- L'Heritage de Caliban (co-editor), essays on Francophone Caribbean literature. Pointe-à-Pitre: Editions Jasor, 1992.
- Penser la Créolité. Paris: Editions Karthala, 1995.

== Awards and honours ==
- 1986: Le Grand Prix Littéraire de la Femme
- 1987: Prix de l'Académie française (La vie scélérate)
- 1988: Liberatur Prize (Ségou)
- 1993: Puterbaugh Prize
- 1997: Prix Carbet de la Caraibe (Desirada)
- 1999: Marguerite Yourcenar Prize (Le coeur à rire et à pleurer)
- 1999: Lifetime Achievement Award from New York University's Africana Studies program
- 2001: Commandeur de l'Ordre des Arts et des Lettres by the French Government
- 2005: Hurston/Wright Legacy Award (Who Slashed Celanire's Throat?)
- 2007: Prix Tropiques de l'Agence française de développement (Victoire, les saveurs et les mots)
- 2008: Trophée des Arts Afro-Caribéens for Les Belles Ténébreuses. Paris
- 2009: Trophée des Arts Afro-Caribéens for Lifetime Achievement. Paris
- 2010: Grand prix du roman métis (En attendant la montée des eaux)
- 2018: New Academy Prize in Literature
- 2020: PEN Translates award for Waiting for the Waters to Rise
- 2021: Prix mondial Cino Del Duca
- 2021: PEN Translates award from English PEN for The Gospel According to the New World
- 2022: Royal Society of Literature International Writer

== See also ==
- Caribbean literature
- Postcolonial literature
- Negritude
