= Annelies Verbeke =

Belgian author (born 1976)

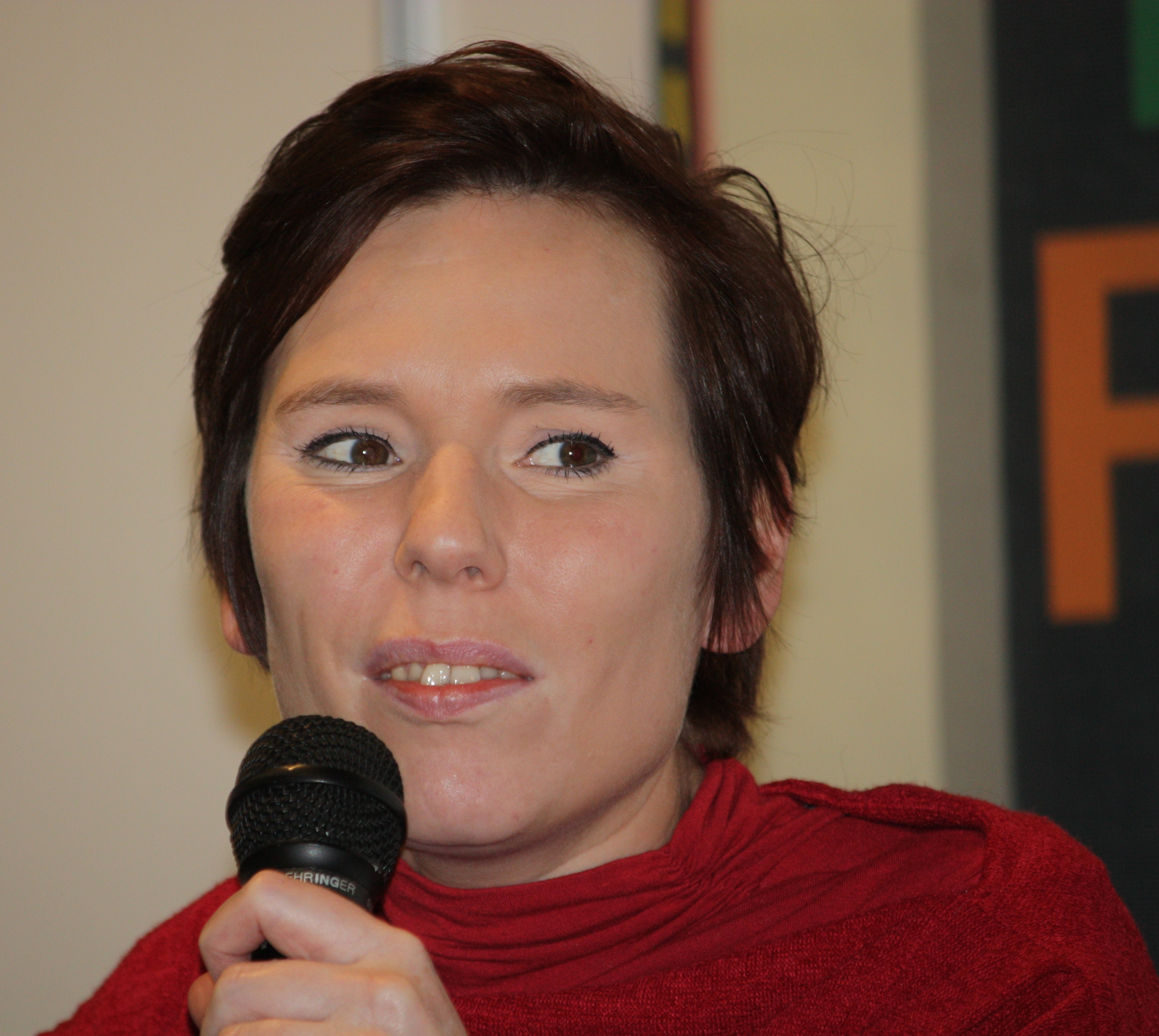
- Annelies Verbeke in 2011
- Born: 6 February 1976 (age 50); Dendermonde, Belgium
- Education: Ghent University
- Occupation: Writer
- Website: www.anneliesverbeke.com

Annelies Verbeke (born 6 February 1976) is a Belgian author who writes in Dutch. She made her name with the novel Slaap! (Sleep!) which has been translated into several languages.

== Biography ==
Verbeke studied language and literature at Ghent University before attending a scriptwriting course in Brussels. In 2003, she gained instant fame with her first novel Slaap! (Sleep!) when 70,000 copies of the Dutch edition were sold. The story has since been published in 22 countries. The award-winning work was highlighted for the way in which it showed how people with various backgrounds were all looking for fulfillment.

A more recent international success has been Vissen redden (Saving Fish, 2009), also translated into several languages including German and Danish.

== Selected works ==
Novels

- (2003) Slaap! (Sleep!)
- (2006) Reus (Giant)
- (2009) Vissen redden (Saving Fish)
- (2015) Dertig dagen (Thirty Days)

Short story collections

- (2007) Groener Gras (Greener Grass)
- (2012) Veronderstellingen (Presuppositions)

Other works

- (2013) Tirol inferno (Tirol Inferno), prose poem
- (2014) Onvoltooid landschap (Unfinished Landscape), short story

Plays

- (2009) Stukken (Pieces)
- (2010) Rail Gourmet (Rail Gourmet)
- (2010) Almschi
- (2012) Flow My Tears
