= Postcolonial literature =

Literature by people from formerly colonized countries

Postcolonial literature is literature by people from formerly colonized countries, originating from all continents except Antarctica. Postcolonial literature often addresses the problems and consequences of colonization and subsequent decolonization of a country, especially questions relating to the political and cultural independence of formerly subjugated people, and themes such as racialism and colonialism. A range of literary theory has evolved around the subject. It examines the role of literature in perpetuating and challenging what postcolonial critic Edward Said calls cultural imperialism. It is at its most overt in texts that write back to the European canon (Thieme 2001).

Migrant literature and postcolonial literature show some considerable overlap. However, not all migration takes place in a colonial setting, and not all postcolonial literature deals with migration. A current debate concerns the extent to which postcolonial theory also speaks to migration literature in non-colonial settings.

== Terminology ==
The significance of the prefix "post-" in "postcolonial" is a matter of contention among scholars and historians. In postcolonial studies, there has not been a unified consensus on when colonialism began and when it has ended (with numerous scholars contending that it has not). The contention has been influenced by the history of colonialism, which is commonly divided into several major phases; the European colonization of the Americas began in the 15th century and lasted until the 19th, while the colonisation of Africa and Asia reached their peak in the 19th century. By the dawn of the 20th century, the vast majority of non-European regions were under European colonial rule; this would last until after the Second World War when anti-colonial independence movements led to the decolonization of Africa, Asia and the Americas. Historians have also expressed differing opinions in regards to the postcolonial status of nations established through settler colonialism, such as the United States, Canada, Australia and New Zealand. Ongoing neocolonialism in the Global South and the effects of colonialism (many of which have persisted after the end of direct colonial rule) have made it difficult to determine whether or not a nation being no longer under colonial rule guarantees its postcolonial status.

Pramod Nayar defines postcolonial literature as "that which negotiates with, contests, and subverts Euro-American ideologies and representations"

=== Evolution of the term ===
Before the term "postcolonial literature" gained currency among scholars, "commonwealth literature" was used to refer to writing in English from colonies or nations which belonged to the British Commonwealth. Even though the term included literature from Britain, it was most commonly used for writing in English written in British colonies. Scholars of commonwealth literature used the term to designate writing in English that dealt with the topic of colonialism. They advocated for its inclusion in literary curricula, hitherto dominated by the British canon. However, the succeeding generation of postcolonial critics, many of whom belonged to the post-structuralist philosophical tradition, took issue with the "commonwealth" label for separating non-British writing from "English" language literature written in Britain. They also suggested that texts in this category frequently presented a short-sighted view on the legacy of colonialism.

Other terms used for English-language literature from former British colonies include terms that designate a national corpus of writing such as Australian or Canadian literature; numerous terms such as "English Literature Other than British and American", "New Literatures in English", "International Literature in English"; and "World Literatures" were coined. These, however, have been dismissed either as too vague or too inaccurate to represent the vast body of dynamic writing emerging from British colonies during and after the period of direct colonial rule. The term "colonial" and "postcolonial" continue to be used for writing emerging during and after the period of colonial rule respectively.

=== "Post-colonial" or "postcolonial"? ===
The consensus in the field is that "post-colonial" (with a hyphen) signifies a period that comes chronologically "after" colonialism. "Postcolonial," on the other hand, signals the persisting impact of colonization across time periods and geographical regions. While the hyphen implies that history unfolds in neatly distinguishable stages from pre- to post-colonial, omitting the hyphen creates a comparative framework by which to understand the varieties of local resistance to colonial impact. Arguments in favor of the hyphen suggest that the term "postcolonial" dilutes differences between colonial histories in different parts of the world and that it homogenizes colonial societies. The body of critical writing that participates in these debates is called Postcolonial theory.

== Critical approaches ==
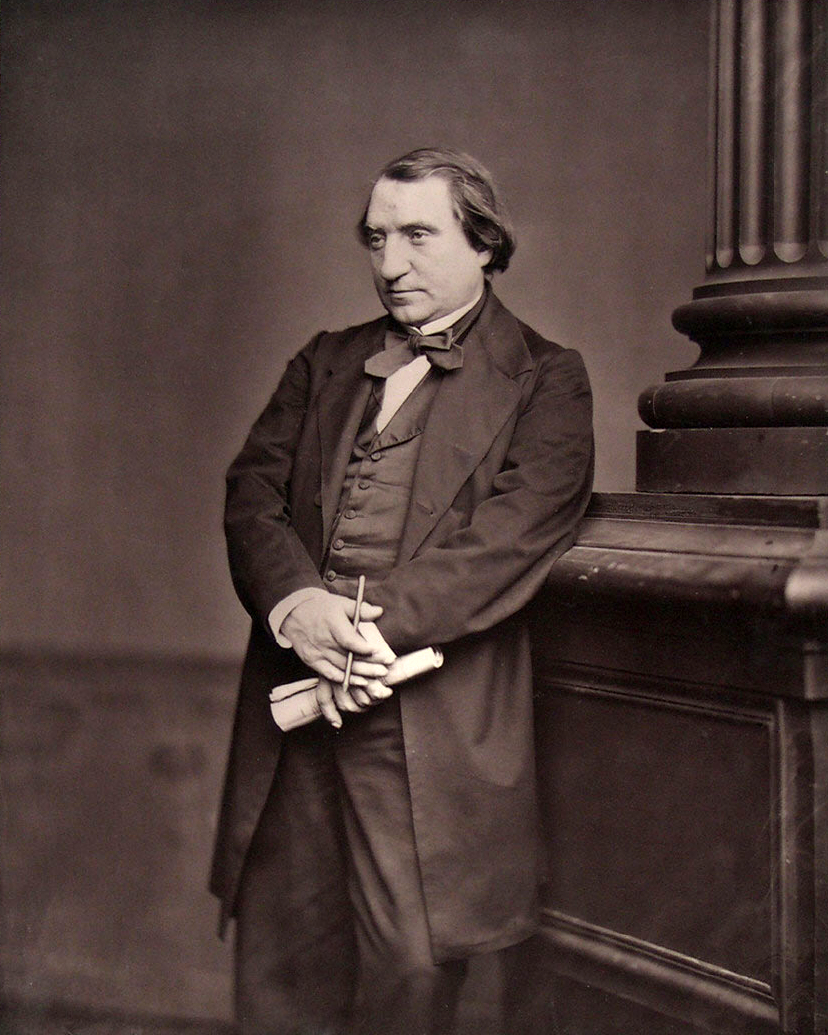
In La Réforme intellectuelle et morale (1871), the Orientalist Ernest Renan advocated imperial stewardship for civilising the non–Western peoples of the world.

Postcolonial fiction writers deal with the traditional colonial discourse, either by modifying or by subverting it, or both. Postcolonial literary theory re-examines colonial and postcolonial literature, especially concentrating upon the social discourse between the colonizer and the colonized that shaped and produced the literature. In Orientalism (1978), Edward Said analyzed the fiction of Honoré de Balzac, Charles Baudelaire, and Lautréamont (Isidore-Lucien Ducasse), exploring how they shaped and were influenced by the societal fantasy of European racial superiority. He pioneered the branch of postcolonial criticism called colonial discourse analysis.

Another important theorist of colonial discourse is Harvard University professor Homi K. Bhabha, (born 1949). He has developed a number of the field's neologisms and key concepts, such as hybridity, third-space, mimicry, difference, and ambivalence. Western canonical works like Shakespeare's The Tempest, Charlotte Brontë's Jane Eyre, Jane Austen's Mansfield Park, Rudyard Kipling's Kim, and Joseph Conrad's Heart of Darkness have been targets of colonial discourse analysis. The succeeding generation of postcolonial critics focus on texts that "write back" to the colonial center. In general, postcolonial theory analyzes how anti-colonial ideas, such as anti-conquest, national unity, négritude, pan-Africanism and postcolonial feminism were forged in and promulgated through literature. Prominent theorists include Gayatri Chakravorty Spivak, Frantz Fanon, Bill Ashcroft, Ngũgĩ wa Thiong'o, Chinua Achebe, Leela Gandhi, Gareth Griffiths, Abiola Irele, John McLeod, Hamid Dabashi, Helen Tiffin, Khal Torabully, and Robert J. C. Young.

=== Nationalism ===
The sense of identification with a nation, or nationalism, fueled anti-colonial movements that sought to gain independence from colonial rule. Language and literature were factors in consolidating this sense of national identity to resist the impact of colonialism. With the advent of the printing press, newspapers and magazines helped people across geographical barriers identify with a shared national community. This idea of the nation as a homogeneous imagined community connected across geographical barriers through the medium of language became the model for the modern nation. Postcolonial literature not only helped consolidate national identity in anti-colonial struggles but also critiqued the European colonial pedigree of nationalism. As depicted in Salman Rushdie's novels for example, the homogeneous nation was built on European models by the exclusion of marginalized voices. They were made up of religious or ethnic elites who spoke on behalf of the entire nation, silencing minority groups.

=== Negritude, pan-Africanism and pan-nationalism ===
Négritude is a literary and ideological philosophy, developed by francophone African intellectuals, writers, and politicians in France during the 1930s. Its initiators included Martinican poet Aimé Césaire, Léopold Sédar Senghor (a future President of Senegal), and Léon Damas of French Guiana. Négritude intellectuals disapproved of French colonialism and claimed that the best strategy to oppose it was to encourage a common racial identity for native Africans worldwide.

Pan-Africanism was a movement among English-speaking black intellectuals who echoed the principles négritude. Frantz Fanon (1925–1961), a Martinique-born Afro-Caribbean psychiatrist, philosopher, revolutionary, and writer, was one of the proponents of the movement. His works are influential in the fields of postcolonial studies, critical theory, and Marxism. As an intellectual, Fanon was a political radical and Marxist humanist concerned with the psychopathology of colonization, and the human, social, and cultural consequences of decolonization.

==== Back to Africa movement ====
Marcus Mosiah Garvey Jr. (1887–1940), another proponent of Pan-Africanism, was a Jamaican political leader, publisher, journalist, entrepreneur, and orator. He founded the Universal Negro Improvement Association and African Communities League (UNIA-ACL). He also founded the Black Star Line, a shipping and passenger line which promoted the return of the African diaspora to their ancestral lands. Prior to the 20th century, leaders such as Prince Hall, Martin Delany, Edward Wilmot Blyden, and Henry Highland Garnet advocated the involvement of the African diaspora in African affairs. However, Garvey was unique in advancing a Pan-African philosophy to inspire a global mass movement and economic empowerment focusing on Africa. The philosophy came to be known as Garveyism. Promoted by the UNIA as a movement of African Redemption, Garveyism would eventually inspire others, ranging from the Nation of Islam to the Rastafari movement (some sects of which proclaim Garvey as a prophet).

Against advocates of literature that promoted African racial solidarity in accordance with negritude principles, Frantz Fanon argued for a national literature aimed at achieving national liberation. Paul Gilroy argued against reading literature both as an expression of a common black racial identity and as a representation of nationalist sentiments. Rather, he argued that black cultural forms—including literature—were diasporic and transnational formations born out of the common historical and geographical effects of transatlantic slavery.

=== Anti-conquest ===
The "anti-conquest narrative" recasts the indigenous inhabitants of colonized countries as victims rather than foes of the colonisers. This depicts the colonised people in a more human light but risks absolving colonisers of responsibility by assuming that native inhabitants were "doomed" to their fate.

In her book Imperial Eyes, Mary Louise Pratt analyzes the strategies by which European travel writing portrays Europe as a secure home space against a contrasting representation of colonized outsiders. She proposes a completely different theorization of "anti-conquest" than the ideas discussed here, one that can be traced to Edward Said. Instead of referring to how natives resist colonization or are victims of it, Pratt analyzes texts in which a European narrates his adventures and struggles to survive in the land of the non-European Other. This secures the innocence of the imperialist even as he exercises his dominance, a strategy Pratt terms "anti-conquest." The anti-conquest is a function of how the narrator writes him or her self out of being responsible for or an agent, direct or indirect, of colonization and colonialism. This different notion of anti-conquest is used to analyze the ways in which colonialism and colonization are legitimized through stories of survival and adventure that purport to inform or entertain. Pratt created this unique notion in association with concepts of contact zone and transculturation, which have been very well received in Latin America social and human science circles. The terms refer to the conditions and effects of encounter between the colonizer and the colonized.

=== Postcolonial feminist literature ===
Postcolonial feminism emerged as a response to the Eurocentric focus of feminism. It accounts for the way that racism and the long-lasting political, economic, and cultural effects of colonialism affect non-white, non-Western women in the postcolonial world. Postcolonial feminism is not simply a subset of postcolonial studies or another variety of feminism. Rather, it seeks to act as an intervention that changes the assumptions of both postcolonial and feminist studies.Audre Lorde's foundational essay, "The Master's Tools Will Never Dismantle the Master's House", uses the metaphor of the master's tools and master's house to explain that western feminism fails to make positive change for third world women because it uses the same tools as the patriarchy. Postcolonial feminist fiction seeks to decolonize the imagination and society. With global debt, labor, and environmental crises one the rise, the precarious position of women (especially in the global south) has become a prevalent concern of postcolonial feminist novels. Common themes include women's roles in globalized societies and the impact of mass migration to metropolitan urban centers. Pivotal texts, including Nawal El Saadawi's The Fall of the Iman about the lynching of women, Chimamanda Adichie's Half of a Yellow Sun about two sisters in pre and post war Nigeria, and Giannina Braschi's United States of Banana which declares the independence of Puerto Rico. Other major voices include Maryse Condé, Fatou Diome, and Marie NDiaye.

Postcolonial feminist cultural theorists include Rey Chow, Maria Lugones, Gayatri Chakravorty Spivak, and Trinh T. Minh-ha.

== Pacific Islands ==
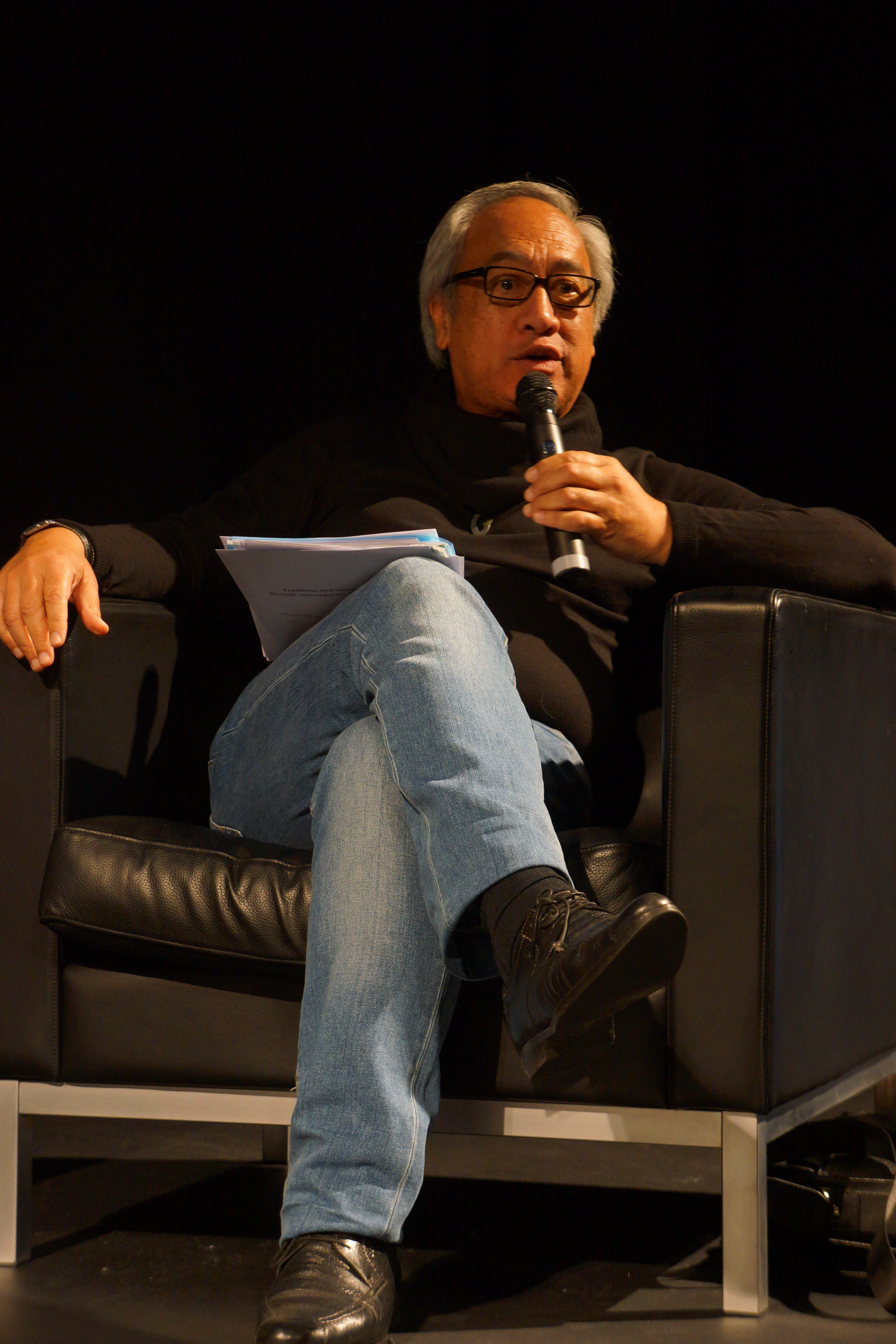
Witi Ihimaera, from New Zealand, the first published Māori novelist

The Pacific Islands comprise 20,000 to 30,000 islands in the Pacific Ocean. Depending on the context, it may refer to countries and islands with common Austronesian origins, islands once or currently colonized, or Oceania.Two of the most influential authors from Pacific Islands are: Witi Ihimaera, New Zealand's first published Māori novelist, and Samoan poet Albert Wendt (born 1939). Wendt lives in New Zealand. Among his works is Leaves of the Banyan Tree (1979). He is of German heritage through his paternal great-grandfather, which is reflected in some of his poems. He describes his family heritage as "totally Samoan", even though he has a German surname. However, he does not explicitly deny his German heritage.

Another notable figure from the region is Sia Figiel (born 1967), a contemporary Samoan novelist, poet, and painter, whose debut novel Where We Once Belonged won the Commonwealth Writers' Prize Best First Book of 1997, South East Asia and South Pacific Region. Sia Figiel grew up amidst traditional Samoan singing and poetry, which heavily influenced her writing. Figiel's greatest influence and inspiration in her career is the Samoan novelist and poet, Albert Wendt.

=== Australia ===
At the point of the first colonization of Australia from 1788, Indigenous Australians (Aboriginal and Torres Strait Islander people) had not developed a system of writing, so the first literary accounts of Aboriginal peoples come from the journals of early European explorers, which contain descriptions of first contact, both violent and friendly. Early accounts by Dutch explorers and the English buccaneer William Dampier wrote of the "natives of New Holland" as being "barbarous savages", but by the time of Captain James Cook and First Fleet marine Watkin Tench (the era of Jean-Jacques Rousseau), accounts of Aboriginal peoples were more sympathetic and romantic: "these people may truly be said to be in the pure state of nature, and may appear to some to be the most wretched upon the earth; but in reality they are far happier than ... we Europeans", wrote Cook in his journal on 23 August 1770.

While his father, James Unaipon (c. 1835–1907), contributed to accounts of Aboriginal mythology written by the South Australian missionary George Taplin, David Unaipon (1872–1967) provided the first accounts of Aboriginal mythology written by an Aboriginal person in his Legendary Tales of the Australian Aborigines. For this he is known as the first Aboriginal author.

Oodgeroo Noonuccal (born Kath Walker, 1920–1995) was an Australian poet, political activist, artist and educator. She was also a campaigner for Aboriginal rights. Oodgeroo was best known for her poetry, and was the first Aboriginal Australian to publish a book of verse, We Are Going (1964).

Sally Morgan's novel My Place (1987) was considered a breakthrough memoir in terms of bringing Indigenous stories to wider notice. Leading Aboriginal activists Marcia Langton (First Australians, 2008) and Noel Pearson (Up From the Mission, 2009) are active contemporary contributors to Australian literature.

The voices of Indigenous Australians continue to be increasingly noticed, and include the playwright Jack Davis and Kevin Gilbert. Writers coming to prominence in the 21st century include Kim Scott, Alexis Wright, Kate Howarth, Tara June Winch, in poetry Yvette Holt and in popular fiction Anita Heiss.

Indigenous authors who have won Australia's high prestige Miles Franklin Award include Kim Scott who was joint winner (with Thea Astley) in 2000 for Benang and again in 2011 for That Deadman Dance. Alexis Wright won the award in 2007 for her novel Carpentaria.

Bruce Pascoe's Dark Emu: Black Seeds: Agriculture or Accident? (2014), which, based on research already done by others but rarely included in standard historical narratives, reexamines colonial accounts of Aboriginal people in Australia and cites evidence of pre-colonial agriculture, engineering and building construction by Aboriginal and Torres Strait Islander peoples. The book won much acclaim, winning the Book of the Year in the NSW Premier's Literary Award and others, as well as selling very well: by 2019 it was in its 28the printing and had sold over 100,000 copies.

Many notable works have been written by non-Indigenous Australians on Aboriginal themes. Eleanor Dark's (1901–1985) The Timeless Land (1941) is the first of The Timeless Land trilogy of novels about European settlement and exploration of Australia. The narrative is told from European and Aboriginal points of view. Other examples include the poems of Judith Wright, The Chant of Jimmie Blacksmith by Thomas Keneally, Ilbarana by Donald Stuart, and the short story by David Malouf: "The Only Speaker of his Tongue".

== Africa ==
Colonialism in 1913: the African colonies of the European empires; and the postcolonial, contemporary political boundaries of the decolonized countries

Amadou Hampâté Bâ (1901–1991), a Malian writer and ethnologist, and Ayi Kwei Armah (born 1939) from Ghana, author of Two Thousand Seasons have tried to establish an African perspective to their own history. Another significant African novel is Season of Migration to the North by Tayib Salih from the Sudan.

Doris Lessing (1919–2013) from Southern Rhodesia, now Zimbabwe, published her first novel The Grass is Singing in 1950, after immigrating to England. She initially wrote about her African experiences. Lessing soon became a dominant presence in the English literary scene, frequently publishing right through the century, and won the Nobel Prize in Literature in 2007. Yvonne Vera (1964–2005) was an author from Zimbabwe. Her novels are known for their poetic prose, difficult subject-matter, and their strong women characters, and are firmly rooted in Zimbabwe's difficult past. Tsitsi Dangarembga (born 1959) is a notable Zimbabwean author and filmmaker.

Ngũgĩ wa Thiong'o (born 1938) is a Kenyan writer, formerly working in English and now working in Gikuyu. His work includes novels, plays, short stories, and essays, ranging from literary and social criticism to children's literature. He is the founder and editor of the Gikuyu-language journal Mũtĩiri. Stephen Atalebe (born 1983) is a Ghanaian Fiction writer who wrote the Hour of Death in Harare, detailing the post-colonial struggles in Zimbabwe as they navigate through sanctions imposed by the British Government under George Blair.

Bate Besong (1954–2007) was a Cameroonian playwright, poet and critic, who was described by Pierre Fandio as "one of the most representative and regular writers of what might be referred to as the second generation of the emergent Cameroonian literature in English". Other Cameroonian playwrights are Anne Tanyi-Tang, and Bole Butake.

Dina Salústio (born 1941) is a Cabo Verdean novelist and poet, whose works are considered an important contribution to Lusophone postcolonial literature, with a particular emphasis on their promotion of women's narratives.

=== Nigeria ===
Nigerian author Chinua Achebe (1930–2013) gained worldwide attention for Things Fall Apart in the late 1950s. Achebe wrote his novels in English and defended the use of English, a "language of colonisers", in African literature. In 1975, his lecture "An Image of Africa: Racism in Conrad's Heart of Darkness" featured a famous criticism of Joseph Conrad as "a thoroughgoing racist". A titled Igbo chieftain himself, Achebe's novels focus on the traditions of Igbo society, the effect of Christian influences, and the clash of Western and traditional African values during and after the colonial era. His style relies heavily on the Igbo oral tradition, and combines straightforward narration with representations of folk stories, proverbs, and oratory. He also published a number of short stories, children's books, and essay collections.

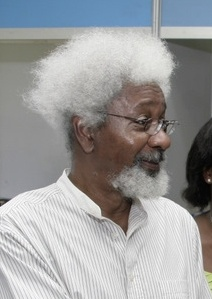
Wole Soyinka, Nigerian playwright and poet and Nobel laureate in 1986

Wole Soyinka (born 1934) is a playwright and poet, who was awarded the 1986 Nobel Prize in Literature, the first African to be honored in that category. Soyinka was born into a Yoruba family in Abeokuta. After studying in Nigeria and Great Britain, he worked with the Royal Court Theatre in London. He went on to write plays that were produced in both countries, in theatres and on radio. He took an active role in Nigeria's political history and its campaign for independence from British colonial rule. In 1965, he seized the Western Nigeria Broadcasting Service studio and broadcast a demand for the cancellation of the Western Nigeria Regional Elections. In 1967 during the Nigerian Civil War, he was arrested by the federal government of General Yakubu Gowon and put in solitary confinement for two years. Soyinka has been a strong critic of successive Nigerian governments, especially the country's many military dictators, as well as other political tyrannies, including the Mugabe regime in Zimbabwe. Much of his writing has been concerned with "the oppressive boot and the irrelevance of the colour of the foot that wears it".

Chimamanda Ngozi Adichie (born 1977) is a novelist, nonfiction writer and short story writer. A MacArthur Genius Grant recipient, Adichie has been called "the most prominent" of a "procession of critically acclaimed young anglophone authors [that] is succeeding in attracting a new generation of readers to African literature".

Flora Nwapa (1931 – 1993) was an Igbo novelist, often considered the mother of modern African Literature, was a prolific novelist whose works focus on the lives of women within Igbo society. Her first novel "Efuru (1966) was the first novel written in English by an African woman, and she worked with Chinua Achebe to get the work into print. She published numerous novels as well as volumes of short stories and poetry. In 1974, she founded Tana Press. In 1977, she founded the Flora Nwapa Company, both of which worked to further the voices of African women writers.

Buchi Emecheta OBE (1944–2017) was a Nigerian novelist based in Britain who published more than 20 books, including Second-Class Citizen (1974), The Bride Price (1976), The Slave Girl (1977) and The Joys of Motherhood (1979). Her themes of child slavery, motherhood, female independence and freedom through education won her considerable critical acclaim and honours.

=== South Africa ===
Elleke Boehmer writes, "Nationalism, like patriarchy, favours singleness—one identity, one growth pattern, one birth and blood for all ... [and] will promote specifically unitary or 'one-eyed' forms of consciousness." The first problem any student of South African literature is confronted with, is the diversity of the literary systems. Gerrit Olivier notes, "While it is not unusual to hear academics and politicians talk about a 'South African literature', the situation at ground level is characterised by diversity and even fragmentation". Robert Mossman adds that "One of the enduring and saddest legacies of the apartheid system may be that no one – White, Black, Coloured (meaning of mixed-race in South Africa), or Asian – can ever speak as a 'South African.'" The problem, however, pre-dates Apartheid significantly, as South Africa is a country made up of communities that have always been linguistically and culturally diverse. These cultures have all retained autonomy to some extent, making a compilation such as the controversial Southern African Literatures by Michael Chapman, difficult. Chapman raises the question:

[W]hose language, culture, or story can be said to have authority in South Africa when the end of apartheid has raised challenging questions as to what it is to be a South African, what it is to live in a new South Africa, whether South Africa is a nation, and, if so, what its mythos is, what requires to be forgotten and what remembered as we scour the past in order to understand the present and seek a path forward into an unknown future.

South Africa has 11 national languages: Afrikaans, English, Zulu, Xhosa, Sotho, Pedi, Tswana, Venda, SiSwati, Tsonga, and Ndebele. Any definitive literary history of South Africa should, it could be argued, discuss literature produced in all eleven languages. But the only literature ever to adopt characteristics that can be said to be "national" is Afrikaans. Olivier argues: "Of all the literatures in South Africa, Afrikaans literature has been the only one to have become a national literature in the sense that it developed a clear image of itself as a separate entity, and that by way of institutional entrenchment through teaching, distribution, a review culture, journals, etc. it could ensure the continuation of that concept." Part of the problem is that English literature has been seen within the greater context of English writing in the world, and has, because of English's global position as lingua franca, not been seen as autonomous or indigenous to South Africa – in Olivier's words: "English literature in South Africa continues to be a sort of extension of British or international English literature." The African languages, on the other hand, are spoken across the borders of Southern Africa - for example, Tswana is spoken in Botswana, and Tsonga in Zimbabwe, and Sotho in Lesotho. South Africa's borders were established during the colonial era and, as with all other colonies, these borders were drawn without regard for the people living within them. Therefore: in a history of South African literature, do we include all Tswana writers, or only the ones with South African citizenship? Chapman bypasses this problem by including "Southern" African literatures. The second problem with the African languages is accessibility, because since the African languages are regional languages, none of them can claim the readership on a national scale comparable to Afrikaans and English. Sotho, for instance, while transgressing the national borders of the RSA, is on the other hand mainly spoken in the Free State, and bears a great amount of relation to the language of Natal for example, Zulu. So the language cannot claim a national readership, while on the other hand being "international" in the sense that it transgresses the national borders.

Olivier argues that "There is no obvious reason why it should be unhealthy or abnormal for different literatures to co-exist in one country, each possessing its own infrastructure and allowing theoreticians to develop impressive theories about polysystems". Yet political idealism proposing a unified "South Africa" (a remnant of the plans drawn up by Sir Henry Bartle Frere) has seeped into literary discourse and demands a unified national literature, which does not exist and has to be fabricated. It is unrealistic to ever think of South Africa and South African literature as homogenous, now or in the near or distant future, since the only reason it is a country at all is the interference of European colonial powers. This is not a racial issue, but rather has to do with culture, heritage and tradition (and indeed the constitution celebrates diversity). Rather, it seems more sensible to discuss South African literature as literature produced within the national borders by the different cultures and language groups inhabiting these borders. Otherwise the danger is emphasising one literary system at the expense of another, and more often than not, the beneficiary is English, with the African languages being ignored. The distinction "black" and "white" literature is further a remnant of colonialism that should be replaced by drawing distinctions between literary systems based on language affiliation rather than race.

The first texts produced by black authors were often inspired by missionaries and frequently deal with African history, in particular the history of kings such as Chaka. Modern South African writing in the African languages tends to play at writing realistically, at providing a mirror to society, and depicts the conflicts between rural and urban settings, between traditional and modern norms, racial conflicts and most recently, the problem of AIDS.

In the first half of the 20th century, epics largely dominated black writing: historical novels, such as Sol T. Plaatje's Mhudi: An Epic of South African Native Life a Hundred Years Ago (1930), Thomas Mofolo's Chaka (trans. 1925), and epic plays including those of H. I. E. Dhlomo, or heroic epic poetry such as the work of Mazizi Kunene. These texts "evince black African patriarchy in its traditional form, with men in authority, often as warriors or kings, and women as background figures of dependency, and/or mothers of the nation". Female literature in the African languages is severely limited because of the strong influence of patriarchy, but over the last decade or two society has changed much and it can be expected that more female voices will emerge.

The following are notable white South African writers in English: Athol Fugard, Nadine Gordimer, J. M. Coetzee, and Wilbur Smith. André Brink has written in both Afrikaans and English while Breyten Breytenbach writes primarily in Afrikaans, though many of their works have been translated into English. Dalene Matthee's (1938–2005) is another Afrikaner, best known for her four Forest Novels, written in and around the Knysna Forest, including Fiela se Kind (1985) (Fiela's Child). Her books have been translated into fourteen languages, including English, French, and German. and over a million copies have been sold worldwide.

== The Americas ==
=== Caribbean Islands ===
Maryse Condé (born 1937) is a French (Guadeloupean) author of historical fiction, best known for her novel Segu (1984–1985).

==== West Indies ====
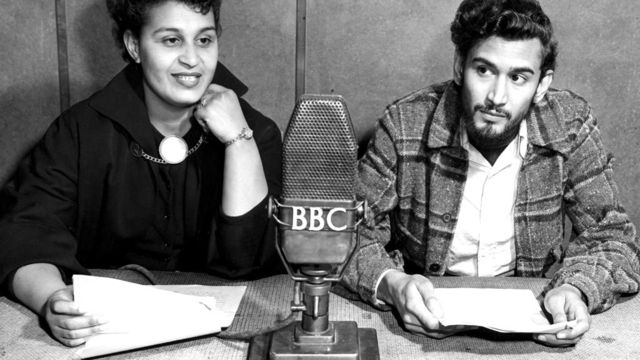
Actress Pauline Henriques and writer Samuel Selvon reading a story on BBC's Caribbean Voices 1952

The term "West Indies" first began to achieve wide currency in the 1950s, when writers such as Samuel Selvon, John Hearne, Edgar Mittelholzer, V.S. Naipaul, and George Lamming began to be published in the United Kingdom. A sense of a single literature developing across the islands was also encouraged in the 1940s by the BBC radio programme Caribbean Voices, which featured stories and poems written by West Indian authors, recorded in London under the direction of producer Henry Swanzy, and broadcast back to the islands. Magazines such as Kyk-Over-Al in Guyana, Bim in Barbados, and Focus in Jamaica, which published work by writers from across the region, also encouraged links and helped build an audience.

Some West Indian writers have found it necessary to leave their home territories and base themselves in the United Kingdom, the United States, or Canada in order to make a living from their work—in some cases spending the greater parts of their careers away from the territories of their birth. Critics in their adopted territories might argue that, for instance, V. S. Naipaul ought to be considered a British writer instead of a Trinidadian writer, or Jamaica Kincaid and Paule Marshall American writers, but most West Indian readers and critics still consider these writers "West Indian".

West Indian literature ranges over subjects and themes as wide as those of any other "national" literature, but in general many West Indian writers share a special concern with questions of identity, ethnicity, and language that rise out of the Caribbean historical experience.

One unique and pervasive characteristic of Caribbean literature is the use of "dialect" forms of the national language, often termed creole. The various local variations in the European languages which became established in the West Indies during the period of European colonial rule. These languages have been modified over the years within each country and each has developed a blend that is unique to their country. Many Caribbean authors in their writing switch liberally between the local variation – now commonly termed nation language – and the standard form of the language. Two West Indian writers have won the Nobel Prize in Literature: Derek Walcott (1992), born in St. Lucia, resident mostly in Trinidad during the 1960s and '70s, and partly in the United States since then; and V. S. Naipaul, born in Trinidad and resident in the United Kingdom since the 1950. (Saint-John Perse, who won the Nobel Prize in 1960, was born in the French territory of Guadeloupe.)

Other notable names in (anglophone) Caribbean literature have included Earl Lovelace, Austin Clarke, Claude McKay, Orlando Patterson, Andrew Salkey, Edward Kamau Brathwaite (who was born in Barbados and has lived in Ghana and Jamaica), Linton Kwesi Johnson, and Michelle Cliff. In more recent times, a number of literary voices have emerged from the Caribbean as well as the Caribbean diaspora, including Kittitian Caryl Phillips (who has lived in the UK since one month of age), Edwidge Danticat, a Haitian immigrant to the United States; Anthony Kellman from Barbados, who divides his time between Barbados and the United States; Andrea Levy of the United Kingdom, Jamaicans Colin Channer and Marlon James, the author of the Man Booker Prize-winning novel A Brief History of Seven Killings (2014) (as well as John Crow's Devil, The Book of Night Women, the unpublished screenplay "Dead Men", and the short story "Under Cover of Darkness"), Antiguan Marie-Elena John, and Lasana M. Sekou from St. Maarten/St. Martin.

The most famous writer from the island of Dominica is British-Dominican author Jean Rhys, best known for her 1966 novel Wide Sargasso Sea, which was written as a prequel to Charlotte Brontë's Jane Eyre. The novel deals with themes of women living in a patriarchal society, race, and assimilation. On 5 November 2019, BBC News listed Wide Sargasso Sea on its list of the 100 most influential novels. The novel has been adapted for stage, film and radio numerous times, most recently as a radio play by BBC Radio 4.

Earl Lovelace (born 1935) is a Trinidadian novelist, journalist, playwright, and short story writer. He is particularly recognized for his descriptive, dramatic fiction on Trinidadian culture: "Using Trinidadian dialect patterns and standard English, he probes the paradoxes often inherent in social change as well as the clash between rural and urban cultures." As Bernardine Evaristo notes, "Lovelace is unusual among celebrated Caribbean writers in that he has always lived in Trinidad. Most writers leave to find support for their literary endeavours elsewhere and this, arguably, shapes the literature, especially after long periods of exile. But Lovelace's fiction is deeply embedded in Trinidadian society and is written from the perspective of one whose ties to his homeland have never been broken."

The Caribbean Literature Day is celebrated annually on July 12, in the Caribbean region, across all language zones, and by Caribbean literature lovers worldwide.

=== United States ===
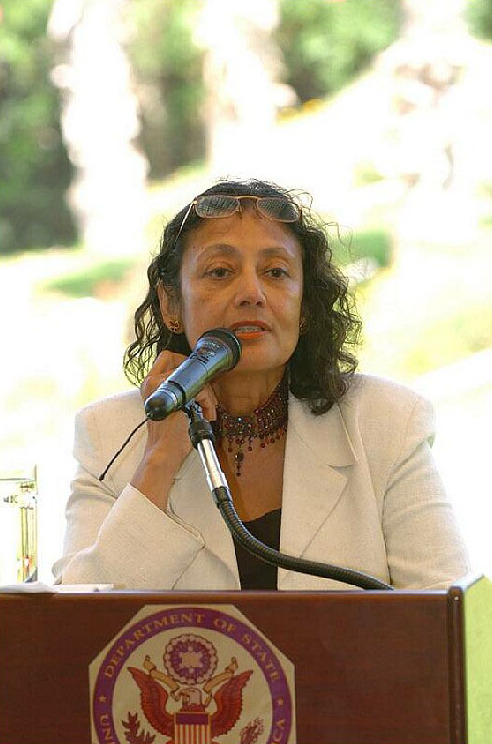
Indian born, American writer Bharati Mukherjee

American David Henry Hwang's play M. Butterfly addresses the Western perspective on China and the French as well as the American perspectives on Vietnam during the Vietnam War. It was inspired by Giacomo Puccini's opera Madama Butterfly.

Maxine Hong Kingston (born 1940) is a Chinese American author who has written three novels and several works of non-fiction about the experiences of Chinese immigrants living in the United States.

Bharati Mukherjee, although of East Indian ancestry, has gone on record that she considers herself an American writer and not an Indian expatriate writer. In a 1989 interview with Amanda Meer, Mukherjee said: "I totally consider myself an American writer, and that has been my big battle: to get to realize that my roots as a writer are no longer, if they ever were, among Indian writers, but that I am writing about the territory, about the feelings, of a new kind of pioneer here in America. I'm the first among Asian immigrants to be making this distinction between immigrant writing and expatriate writing. Most Indian writers prior to this have still thought of themselves as Indians, and their literary inspiration has come from India. India has been the source and home. Whereas I'm saying, those are wonderful roots, but now my roots are here, and my emotions are here, in North America."

Jhumpa Lahiri (born 1967) is an Indian-American author. Lahiri's debut short story collection Interpreter of Maladies (1999) won the 2000 Pulitzer Prize for Fiction, and her first novel, The Namesake (2003), was adapted into the popular film of the same name.

==== African-American literature ====
Throughout American history, African Americans have been discriminated against and subject to racist attitudes. This experience inspired some Black writers, at least during the early years of African-American literature, to prove they were the equals of European-American authors. As Henry Louis Gates Jr., has said, "it is fair to describe the subtext of the history of black letters as this urge to refute the claim that because blacks had no written traditions they were bearers of an inferior culture."

By refuting the claims of the dominant culture, African-American writers were also attempting to subvert the literary and power traditions of the United States. Some scholars assert that writing has traditionally been seen as "something defined by the dominant culture as a white male activity." This means that, in American society, literary acceptance has traditionally been intimately tied in with the very power dynamics which perpetrated such evils as racial discrimination. By borrowing from and incorporating the non-written oral traditions and folk life of the African diaspora, African-American literature broke "the mystique of connection between literary authority and patriarchal power." In producing their own literature, African Americans were able to establish their own literary traditions devoid of the white intellectual filter. In 1922, W. E. B. Du Bois wrote that "the great mission of the Negro to America and to the modern world" was to develop "Art and the appreciation of the Beautiful".

==== Puerto Rico ====
Giannina Braschi (born 1953) is a Puerto Rican writer, who is credited with writing the first Spanglish novel Yo-Yo Boing! (1998), the post-modern poetry trilogy Empire of Dreams (1994), and the philosophical fiction United States of Banana (2011), which chronicles the Latin American immigrants' experiences in the United States and the Puerto Rican battle with Spanish and American colonialism.

=== Canada ===
Canadian writer Margaret Laurence's work was informed by colonial relations and African culture when she lived in British Somaliland then the Gold Coast British colony in the 1950s near the end of their times as colonies. Margaret Atwood is a post-colonial writer who dealt with themes of identity-seeking through her Southern Ontario Gothic style of writing.

Canadian Michael Ondaatje, is an internationally acclaimed author with Sri Lankan roots, which he has explored in works like Running in the Family (1983) and The Cat's Table (2011).

Cyril Dabydeen (born 1945) is a Guyana-born, Canadian writer of Indian descent. He grew up in a sugar plantation with the sense of Indian indenture rooted in his family background.

African-Canadian George Elliott Clarke has promoted Black authors with Directions Home: Approaches to African-Canadian Literature (2012) as well as his own poetry, novels and plays.

In the decade 2008-2018 Canadian Indigenous writers published so many works that some critics called it a renaissance. This phenomenon was studied in Introduction to Indigenous Literary Criticism in Canada (2015). Eds Heather MacFarlane & Armand Garnet Ruffo.

Canadian scholar, Joseph Pivato has promoted the study of ethnic minority authors with Comparative Literature for the New Century (2018). Eds. Giulia De Gasperi & Joseph Pivato.

== East Asia ==
=== Korea ===
Chunghee Sara Soh's book The Comfort Women: Sexual Violence and Postcolonial Memory in Korea and Japan has shed new light on the practice of having forced sexual slavery, called "comfort women" during the Imperial Japanese army before and during World War II.

== West Asia: The Middle East ==
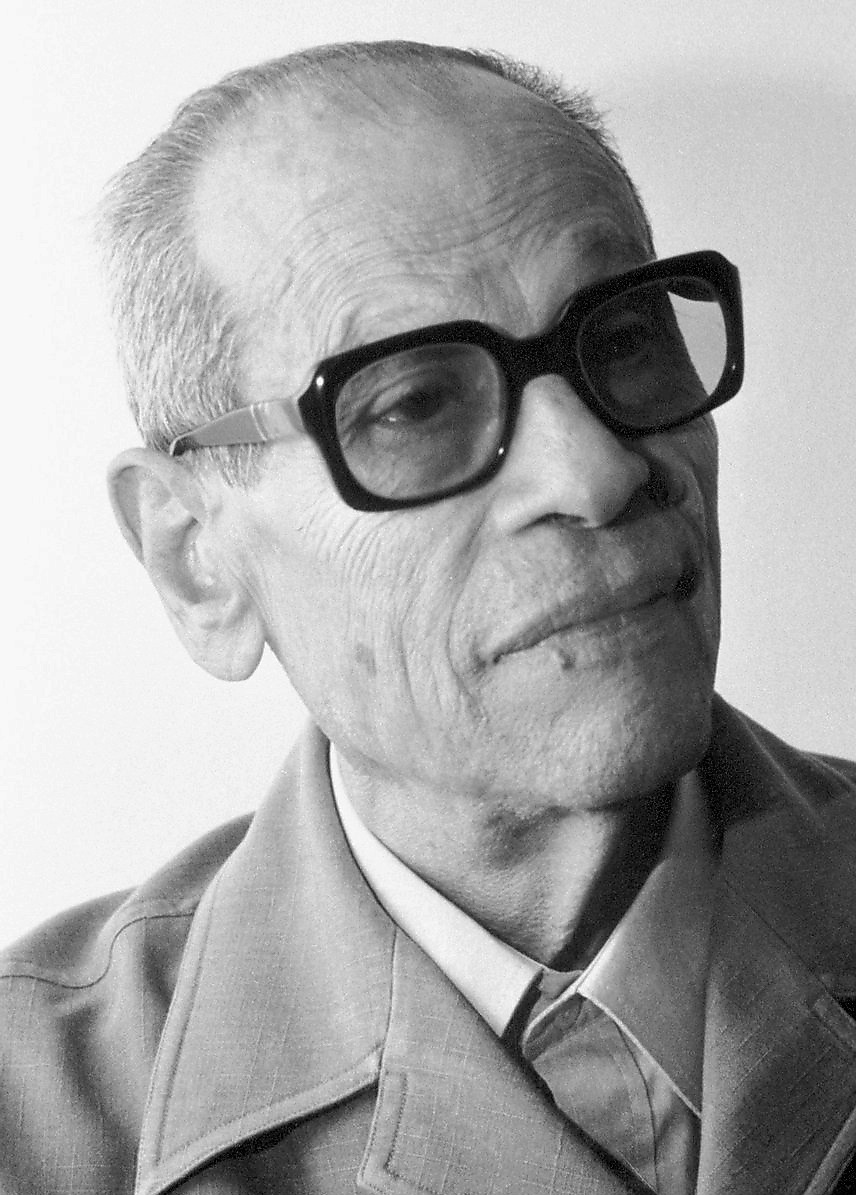
Leading Egyptian novelist Naguib Mahfouz

Major figures in the postcolonial literature of the Middle East included Egyptian novelist Naguib Mahfouz and Palestinian-American scholar Edward Said. Said published his most famous work, Orientalism, discussing the depiction of Asia by the Western world. Mahfouz was inspired to write in a large part by his experiences during the Egyptian Revolution of 1919 (when he was seven years old), including witnessing British soldiers firing on crowds of demonstrators in an effort to disperse them; according to Mahfouz, "You could say ... that the one thing which most shook the security of my childhood was the 1919 revolution", as he recounted in an interview.

== South and Southeast Asia ==
=== Philippines ===
Philippine literature includes the legends of prehistory, and the colonial legacy of the Philippines. Pre-Hispanic Philippine literature were actually epics passed on from generation to generation originally through oral tradition. However, wealthy families, especially in Mindanao were able to keep transcribed copies of these epics as family heirloom. One such epic was the Darangen, epic of the Maranaos of Lake Lanao. Most of the epics were known during the Spanish era.

Most of the notable literature of the Philippines was written during the Spanish period and the first half of the 20th century in the Spanish language. Philippine literature is written in Spanish, English, or any indigenous Philippine languages. Notable authors include F. Sionil José, Jose Dalisay Jr., N. V. M. Gonzalez and Nick Joaquin.

=== Indonesia ===
==== Dutch East Indies ====
Dutch Indies literature includes Dutch language postcolonial literature reflecting on the era of the Dutch East Indies (now Indonesia). Much of the postcolonial literature of this genre is written by Dutch Eurasians known as Indos. Important authors that have been translated to English include, Tjalie Robinson, Maria Dermout, and Marion Bloem.

=== Singapore ===
Bonny Hicks (1968–1997) was a Singapore Eurasian model and writer. After garnering fame as a model, she gained recognition for her contributions to Singaporean post-colonial literature and for the anthropic philosophy conveyed in her works. Her first book, Excuse Me, Are You A Model?, is recognised as a significant milestone in the literary and cultural history of Singapore.

=== India ===
One of the key issues is the superiority/inferiority of Indian Writing in English (IWE) as opposed to the literary production in the various languages of India. Key polar concepts bandied in this context are superficial/authentic, imitative/creative, shallow/deep, critical/uncritical, elitist/parochial and so on.

The views of Salman Rushdie and Amit Chaudhuri expressed through their books The Vintage Book of Indian Writing and The Picador Book of Modern Indian Literature respectively essentialise this battle. Rushdie's statement in his book – "the ironic proposition that India's best writing since independence may have been done in the language of the departed imperialists is simply too much for some folks to bear" – created a lot of resentment among many writers, including writers in English. In his book, Amit Chaudhuri questions – "Can it be true that Indian writing, that endlessly rich, complex and problematic entity, is to be represented by a handful of writers who write in English, who live in England or America and whom one might have met at a party?"

Chaudhuri feels that after Rushdie, Indian writing in English started employing magical realism, bagginess, non-linear narrative and hybrid language to sustain themes seen as microcosms of India and supposedly reflecting Indian conditions. He contrasts this with the works of earlier writers such as R. K. Narayan where the use of English is pure, but the deciphering of meaning needs cultural familiarity. He also feels that Indian is a theme constructed only in IWE and does not articulate itself in the vernacular literature. He further adds "the post-colonial novel, becomes a trope for an ideal hybrid by which the West celebrates not so much Indian, whatever that infinitely complex thing is, but its own historical quest, its reinterpretation of itself".

Some of these arguments form an integral part of what is called postcolonial theory. The very categorisation of IWE – as IWE or under post-colonial literature – is seen by some as limiting. Amitav Ghosh made his views on this very clear by refusing to accept the Eurasian Commonwealth Writers Prize for his book The Glass Palace in 2001 and withdrawing it from the subsequent stage.

Indian authors like Amitav Ghosh, Anita Desai, Hanif Kureishi, Rohinton Mistry, Meena Alexander, Arundhati Roy and Kiran Desai have written about their postcolonial experiences.

The most significant novels of the current generation of Indian novelists in Urdu are Makaan by Paigham Afaqui (born 1956), Do Gaz Zameen by Abdus Samad, and Pani by Ghazanfer. These works, especially Makaan, has moved the Urdu novel beyond the prevalent themes relating to Pakistan's gaining of independence in 1947, and identity issues, and take it into modern-day realities and issues of life in India. Makaan influenced many English writers including Vikram Seth. Paigham Afaqui's second major novel, Paleeta, was published in 2011 and depicts the political cynicism of a common Indian citizen in the six decades after India's independence.

The Hungry Generation was a literary movement in the Bengali language launched by what is known today as the "Hungryalist quartet", i.e. Shakti Chattopadhyay, Malay Roy Choudhury, Samir Roychoudhury and Debi Roy (alias Haradhon Dhara), during the 1960s in Kolkata, India. Due to their involvement in this avant garde cultural movement, the leaders lost their jobs and were jailed by the incumbent government. They challenged contemporary ideas about literature and contributed significantly to the evolution of the language and idiom used by contemporaneous artists to express their feelings in literature and painting.

Khushwant Singh (1915-2014) has written numerous fiction and non-fiction novels about the India-Pakistan Partition.

Nissim Ezekiel (1924–2004) was a foundational figure in postcolonial India's literary history, specifically for Indian writing in English.

Mahashweta Devi (1926–2016) is an Indian social activist and writer.

Urvashi Butalia's The Other Side of Silence is a collection of oral histories and testimonies about the India-Pakistan Partition.

=== Sri Lanka ===
Sri Lankan writers like Nihal De Silva and Carl Muller write about the post-colonial situation and the ethnic conflict in Sri Lanka. Notably authors such as the D.C.R.A Goonetilleke in Sri Lankan English Literature and the Sri Lankan People 1917-2003 targets the evolution of Sri Lankan English Literature specifically in regards to the acceptance of the English language and other major controversies of the time in Sri Lankan literature, after its Independence from the British Empire in 1948.

=== Bangladesh ===
Selim Al Deen from Bangladesh has also written postcolonial drama.

== Europe ==
=== Britain ===
The novels of J. G. Farrell are important texts dealing with the decline of the British Empire. Farrell's novel Troubles, set during the Irish War of Independence (1919–1921), is the first instalment in Farrell's "Empire Trilogy", preceding The Siege of Krishnapur and The Singapore Grip, all written during the 1970s. Although there are similar themes within the three novels (most notably that of the British Empire), they do not form a sequence of storytelling. The Siege of Krishnapur was inspired by events such as the sieges of Cawnpore and Lucknow, and details the siege of a fictional Indian town, Krishnapur, during the Indian Rebellion of 1857 from the perspective of the city's British residents. The Singapore Grip is satirical book about events following Japan's entry into the Second World War and occupation of Singapore. The story centres on a British family who own one of the colony's leading trading companies.

Novelist E. M. Forster's A Passage to India (1924) takes as its subject the relationship between East and West, seen through the lens of India in the later days of the British Raj. Forster connects personal relationships with the politics of colonialism through the story of the Englishwoman Adela Quested, the Indian Dr. Aziz, and the question of what did or did not happen between them in the Marabar Caves.

The Raj Quartet a four-volume novel sequence, written by Paul Scott, also deals with the subject of British colonial rule in India, in this case the concluding years of the British Raj. The series was written during the period 1965–1975. The Times called it "one of the most important landmarks of post-war fiction." The story of The Raj Quartet begins in 1942. World War II is at its zenith, and in South East Asia, the Allied forces have suffered great losses. Burma has been captured by Japan, and the Japanese invasion of the Indian subcontinent from the east appears imminent. The year 1942 is also marked by Indian nationalist leader Mahatma Gandhi's call for the Quit India movement to the British colonial government. The Raj Quartet is set in this tumultuous background for the British soldiers and civilians stationed in India who have a duty to manage this part of the British Empire. One recurrent theme is the moral certainty of the older generation as contrasted with the anomie of the younger. Another theme is the treatment of Indians by Britons living in India. As a reflection of these themes. the British characters let themselves be "trapped by codes and principles, which were in part to keep their own fears and doubts at bay."

An Outpost of Progress and Heart of Darkness by Polish-British writer Joseph Conrad are based on his experiences in the Congo Free State. There is also The Congo Diary and Other Uncollected Pieces.

=== Wales ===
Wales was gradually annexed by the Kingdom of England during the Middle Ages, and was fully incorporated within the English legal system under the Laws in Wales Acts 1535–1542. Distinctive Welsh politics developed in the 19th century, and Welsh nationalism grew during the 20th century. The Welsh nationalist party, Plaid Cymru, was formed in 1925 and the Welsh Language Society in 1962.

Welsh poet, novelist and dramatist Saunders Lewis, who was a prominent support of nationalism in Wales, rejected the possibility of Anglo-Welsh literature due to the language's status as the official tongue of the British state, affirming that "the literature which people called Anglo-Welsh was indistinguishable from English literature". Saunders Lewis was himself born in Wallasey in England to a Welsh-speaking family.

The attitude of the post-war generation of Welsh writers in English towards Wales differs from the previous generation, in that they were more sympathetic to Welsh nationalism and to the Welsh language. The change can be linked to the nationalist fervour generated by Saunders Lewis and the burning of the Bombing School on the Lleyn Peninsula in 1936, along with a sense of crisis generated by the Second World War. In poetry R. S. Thomas (1913–2000) was the most important figure throughout the second half of the 20th century, beginning with The Stones of the Field in 1946 and concluding with No Truce with the Furies (1995). While he "did not learn the Welsh language until he was 30 and wrote all his poems in English", he wanted the Welsh language to be made the official language of Wales, and the policy of Anglo-Welsh bilingualism abolished. He wrote his autobiography in Welsh, but said he lacked the necessary grasp of the language to employ it in his poems. Although an Anglican priest, he was a fervent nationalist and advocated boycotts against English owners of holiday homes in Wales. As an admirer of Saunders Lewis, Thomas defended his need to use English: "Since there is in Wales a mother tongue that continues to flourish, a proper Welshman can only look on English as a means of rekindling interest in the Welsh language, and of leading people back to the mother tongue."

With the creation the National Assembly for Wales, under the Government of Wales Act 1998, Wales now has more local autonomy from the central government in London. The Welsh Language Act 1993 and the Government of Wales Act 1998 provide that the English and Welsh languages be treated on a basis of equality. English is spoken by almost all people in Wales and is the de facto main language. Northern and western Wales retain many areas where Welsh is spoken as a first language by the majority of the population, and English learnt as a second language. The 2011 Census showed 562,016 people, 19.0% of the Welsh population, were able to speak Welsh.

=== Ireland ===
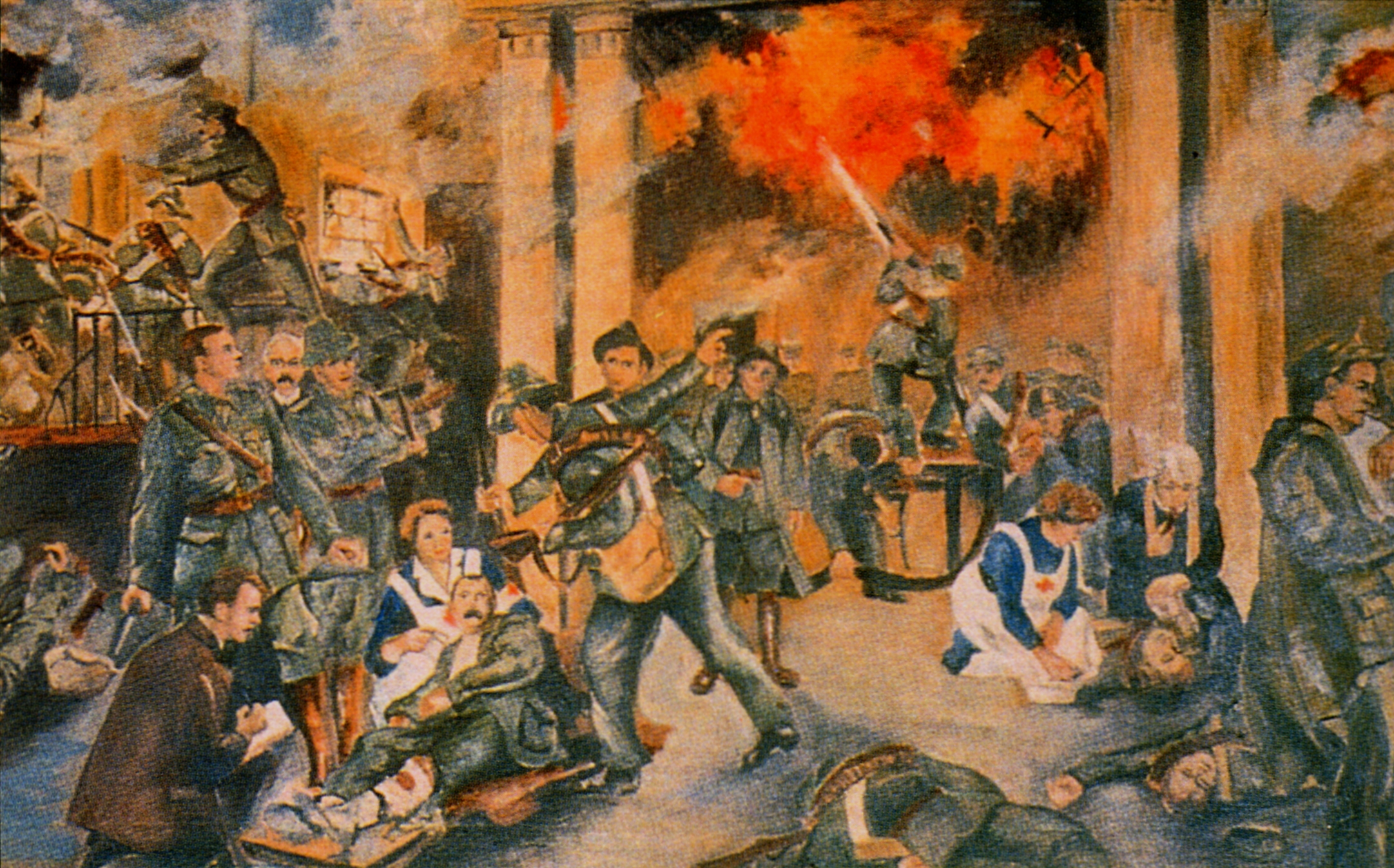
Birth of the Irish Republic"´ by Walter Paget, depicting the Dublin General Post Office being shelled during the Easter Uprising of 1916

The English language was introduced to Ireland in the 13th century, following the Norman Conquest of Ireland. However, English rule did not extend over the whole island until the 16th–17th century Tudor conquest, which led to plantation of Ireland. In the 1690s, the Protestant Anglo-Irish started to become dominant over the Catholic majority, which was extended during the 18th century. The Irish language, however, remained the dominant language of Irish literature down to the 19th century, despite a slow decline which began in the 17th century with the expansion of English control in Ireland.

The 17th century saw the tightening of English control over Ireland and the suppression of the Irish aristocracy. This meant that the literary class lost its patrons, since the new nobility were English speakers with little interest for the older culture. The elaborate classical metres lost their dominance and were largely replaced by more popular forms. This was an age of social and political tension, as expressed by the poet Dáibhí Ó Bruadair and the anonymous authors of Pairliment Chloinne Tomáis, a prose satire on the aspirations of the lower classes. Prose of another sort was represented by the historical works of Geoffrey Keating (Seathrún Céitinn) and the compilation known as the Annals of the Four Masters.

The consequences of these changes were seen in the 18th century. Poetry was still the dominant literary medium and its practitioners were poor scholars, often educated in the classics at local schools and schoolmasters by trade. Such writers produced polished work in popular metres for a local audience. This was particularly the case in Munster, in the south-west of Ireland, and notable names included Eoghan Rua Ó Súilleabháin and Aogán Ó Rathaille of Sliabh Luachra. A certain number of local patrons were still to be found, even in the early 19th century, and especially among the few surviving families of the Gaelic aristocracy. In the first half of the 18th century Dublin was the home of an Irish-language literary circle connected to the Ó Neachtain (Naughton) family, a group with wide-ranging Continental connections.

With the Acts of Union in 1801, Ireland became a part of the United Kingdom. The latter part of the 19th century saw a rapid replacement of Irish by English in the greater part of the country, though Irish was still an urban language, and continued to be so well into the 19th century. At the end of the 19th century, however, cultural nationalism displayed a new energy, marked by the Gaelic Revival (which encouraged a modern literature in Irish) and more generally by the Irish Literary Revival.

A war of independence in the early 20th century was followed by the partition of the island, creating the Irish Free State in 1922, which became increasingly sovereign over the following decades, and Northern Ireland, which remained a part of the United Kingdom.

=== Italy ===
Italian postcolonial literature comprises a body of works and discursive practices that developed from the 1990s onward, in relation to Italy’s colonial history and contemporary migration processes. It is characterized by the emergence of authorial voices, particularly from the former Italian colonies (such as Eritrea, Somalia, and Ethiopia) or from their related diasporas, who write in Italian while critically engaging with memory, identity, language, and power relations inherited from colonialism. This literary production is situated at the intersection of postcolonial studies, migration studies, and reflections on citizenship and cultural belonging. These works challenge the removal of Italy’s colonial past from collective memory and contribute to redefining the very idea of Italianità, proposing it as a plural and transnational space. Among the most significant figures are authors such as Ribka Sibhatu, born in Eritrea, who in her works interweaves orality, memory, and tradition, exploring the relationship between her culture of origin and writing in Italian. Shirin Ramzanali Fazel, of Somali origin, has contributed to bringing to light the memories of colonialism and exile, often in autobiographical and testimonial forms such as Islam and Me (2024). Cristina Ali Farah, also Somali-Italian, addresses themes such as the Somali civil war, the diaspora, and hybrid identities, employing fragmented and polyphonic narration. Although she did not migrate from the former colonies, Igiaba Scego in her narrative and essayistic works also investigates the link between Rome and Mogadishu, between private history and colonial memory, contributing to a critical re-reading of urban space and national history. Kaha Mohamed Aden proposes an ironic and incisive writing style that deconstructs cultural stereotypes and exoticizing representations, while Geneviève Makaping, an anthropologist and writer originally from Cameroon, is the author of Reversing the Gaze. What if you were the Other (2023), considered one of the first texts of critical race theory in the Italian language, in which she analyzes the cultural mechanisms of the colonial gaze and everyday racism. Italian postcolonial literature thus emerges as a fundamental critical space for understanding the contemporary transformations of Italian society and its unresolved relationship with its colonial past.

=== Poland ===
Clare Cavanagh believes that literature of Poland is postcolonial. Dariusz Skórczewski supports her and reveals how the experiences of foreign domination and the history of empire have shaped contemporary Polish culture and society. They both criticize Marxist basis of postcolonialism.

== See also ==
- Category: Postcolonial literature
- Postcolonial Studies
- Journal of Postcolonial Writing
- Migrant literature
- Breton literature
- Catalan literature
- Colonial cinema
- Caribbean literature
- Caribbean poetry
- Native American literature
- Francophone literature
- Māori poetry
- TSAR Publications – a book publisher focusing on Canadian multicultural literature
- Vernacular literature

== Bibliography ==
- Baldick, Chris (2015). "Postcolonial literature". The Oxford Dictionary of Literary Terms (Online Version) (4th ed.). Oxford University Press. ISBN 9780191783234.
- Bhabha, Homi (1994). The Location of Culture, Routledge, ISBN 0-415-05406-0
- Eugene Benson and L. W. Conolly (eds.), Encyclopedia of Post-Colonial Literatures in English, 1994, 2005.
- Elleke Boehmer, Colonial and Postcolonial Literature: Migrant Metaphors
- Clarke, George Elliott. Directions Home: Approaches to African-Canadian Literature. University of Toronto Press, 2012.
- De Gasperi, Giulia & Joseph Pivato. Eds. Comparative Literature for the New Century. McGill-Queen's U. P., 2018.
- Tobias Döring, Postcolonial Literatures in English: An Introduction, 2008.
- Hart, Jonathan; Goldie, Terrie (1993). "Post-colonial theory". In Makaryk, Irene Rima; Hutcheon, Linda; Perron, Paul (eds.). Encyclopedia of contemporary literary theory: approaches, scholars, terms. Toronto, Canada: University of Toronto Press. ISBN 978-0-8020-5914-7.
- Alamgir Hashmi, Commonwealth Literature: An Essay Towards the Re-definition of a Popular/Counter Culture, 1983.
- Alamgir Hashmi, The Commonwealth, Comparative Literature and the World, 1988.
- Chelsea 46: World Literature in English (1987)
- Poetry International 7/8 (2003–2004)
- John McLeod, Beginning Postcolonialism, second edition (MUP, 2010).
- Gerald Moore and Ulli Beier, eds. Penguin Book of Modern African Poetry
- Britta Olinde, A Sense of Place: Essays in Post-Colonial Literatures
- Olivier, Gerrit (1995). "Afrikaans and South African Literature". Journal of Literary Studies. 11 (2): 38–48. doi:10.1080/02564719508530106. ISSN 0256-4718.
- Prem Poddar and David Johnson, A Historical Companion to Postcolonial Literature in English, 2005.
- Popescu, Monica (2020). At Penpoint. African Literatures, Postcolonial Studies, and the Cold War (pdf). Durham, NC; London: Duke University Press. doi:10.1515/9781478012153. ISBN 978-1-4780-0940-5. S2CID 241238726.
- John Thieme, The Arnold Anthology of Post-Colonial Literatures in English, London and New York: Arnold, 1996.
- John Thieme, Postcolonial Con-Texts: Writing Back to the Canon, London and New York: Continuum, 2001.
- John Thieme Post-Colonial Studies: The Essential Glossary, London and New York: Arnold, 2003.
- Peter Thompson, Littérature moderne du monde francophone. Chicago: NTC (McGraw-Hill), 1997
- Jaydeep Sarangi, Indian Novels in English: Texts, Contexts and Language, Authorspress, New Delhi, 2018
- Postcolonial Theory and the Arab–Israeli Conflict edited by Philip Carl Salzman and Donna Robinson Divine, Routledge (2008)
- Friedman, Amy L. Postcolonial Satire: Indian Fiction and the Reimagining of Menippean Satire. Lexington, 2019.
