= The Empire Writes Back =

1989 book by Bill Ashcroft, Gareth Griffiths and Helen Tiffin

The Empire Writes Back : Theory and Practice in Post-Colonial Literatures
- Author: Bill Ashcroft, Gareth Griffiths, and Helen Tiffin
- Language: English
- Series: New Accents Ser.
- Subjects: Commonwealth literature (English) -- History and criticism. English literature -- 20th century -- History and criticism. Postcolonialism -- English-speaking countries. Postcolonialism -- Commonwealth countries. Postcolonialism in literature. Colonies in literature.
- Genre: LITERARY CRITICISM / Caribbean & Latin American LITERARY CRITICISM / European / English, Irish, Scottish, Welsh LITERARY CRITICISM / General
- Published: 1989
- Publisher: Taylor & Francis Group
- Publication place: America
- Pages: 296
- ISBN: 978-0-415-28019-8

The Empire Writes Back: Theory and Practice in Post-Colonial Literatures is a 1989 non-fiction book on postcolonialism, penned by Bill Ashcroft, Gareth Griffiths and Helen Tiffin. The Empire Writes Back was the first major theoretical account of a wide range of postcolonial texts and their relationship with bigger issues of postcolonial culture, and is said to be one of the most significant and important works published in the field of postcolonialism. The writers debate on the relationships within postcolonial works, study the mighty forces acting on words in the postcolonial text, and prove how these texts constitute a radical critique of Eurocentric notions of language and literature. First released in 1989, this book had a second edition published in 2002.

The title refers to Salman Rushdie's 1982 article "The Empire Writes Back with a Vengeance". In addition to being a pun on the film Star Wars: The Empire Strikes Back, the phrase refers to the ways postcolonial voices respond to the literary canon of the colonial centre.

== Background ==
Map of Decolonized Countries. Special Committee on Decolonization. United Nations.

The Empire Writes Back: Theory and Practice in Post-Colonial Literatures aims to give a theoretical account of an extensive range of postcolonial texts and how these texts relate to a greater number of issues relating to postcolonial culture. The term "postcolonial" in this book covers all the cultures of nations that have been affected by imperial policies that extend the rule and power of an empire or nation over foreign countries, or of acquiring and holding colonies and dependencies. Colonialism places the imperial interests over the interests of the dependent states. A process of decolonization has been attempted around colonized states to combat the negative effects of colonization on national and personal identity. The theoretical process of decolonization is a major subject that the authors examine.

Post-colonial literature examines countries: African countries, Australia, Bangladesh, Canada, Caribbean countries, India, Malaysia, Malta, New Zealand, Pakistan, Singapore, South Pacific Island countries and Sri Lanka that are widely discussed in this book. The literature of these countries is based on how European nations have dominated and controlled "Third World" culture and how these countries have reacted to and resisted those encroachments. They follow the development of postcolonial studies from the imperial period when the colonized lands are more or less "fictionally" represented in travel accounts, documents and diaries, fictional, photographic, and cinematic appropriation, to the natives' literature written under the "imperial licence" and finally to the so-called "postcolonial" writing. The Empire Writes Back considers the intertextually of postcolonial works and authorship by virtue of its references to a cultural, hegemonic discourse which it undermines and subverts, its sometimes parodic interpretation of the imperial discourse, and its ludic preferences regarding narrative techniques and linguistic nuances.

The authors of this book have explained that the task of the book is two-fold. The first task is to find the range and the exact nature of postcolonial scholarship, and the second task is to describe and account for the different theories which have emerged so far.

== Overview of Post-Colonial Studies ==
Four international organizations whose membership largely follows the pattern of previous colonial empires.

Post-colonialist literature is an academic study investigating the interplay between two discourses: colonialism (1871) and postcolonialism (1980). During the mid-20th century, a process of decolonization occurred whereby nations attempted to undo the effects of colonialism, granting its citizens the right to self-determination. As a result, postcolonial studies started to reflect the decolonization of nations in theory, referred to as "intellectual decolonisation". Postcolonial literature became centrally about strategically subverting colonizers' hegemony over the colonized by dismantling Eurocentric discourses.

In academia, literary theory has been the traditional home of postcolonial analysis such as the work of Gayatri Spivak on "the subaltern", Edward Said on "orientalism", Homi K. Bhabha on "hybridity", and Ngũgĩ wa Thiong'o on "language". These notable theorists are referred to throughout postcolonial literature and specifically in The Empire Writes Back when discussing colonial politics. Their investigative work seeks to offer redefinitions of representations of otherness, ex/centric, centre/periphery, decentralization, national identity, and deconstructing the semantics of language and vocabularies that underpin Eurocentric epistemological privilege. The Empire Writes Back is a theoretical account exploring the nexus between these literary scholars and their relation to the larger issues of postcolonial culture.

== Chapter Summary ==
=== Chapter 1: Cutting the ground: critical models of post-colonial literatures ===
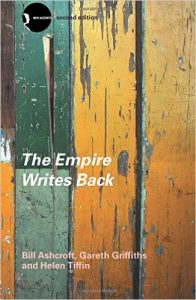
The Empire Writes Back Book Cover, 2nd Edition, New Accents.

In Chapter 1, the authors look at the development of descriptive models of postcolonial writing by examining the different ways in which they appropriate and arrange the material used in "linguistic" culture. To this end, they have four major models.

==== First Model ====
The first model is the national or regional model related to distinctive national or regional culture, literature, and language surrounding different communities. The emergence of a distinctive American literature in the late eighteenth century made the United States a postcolonial nation to link literature with nationality. The experience of developing this "national literature" in the attempt to create a new type of literature can be seen as the model for all later postcolonial writings. This illustrated that some of a postcolonial nation's strongest linguistic and cultural traits depend on its relationship with the colonising power which developed different characteristics from that of Britain.

Tied closely to the distinctive national or regional culture is the comparison between two or more regions that have diverse ideas. The comparisons between countries of the white diaspora; comparisons between areas of Black diaspora and comparisons across black and white communities allow for an understanding of the assimilation to predominantly British world-view that occurred due to colonization. By establishing the inter-relationship between the two cultures, the authors posit that black and white colonies are not able to escape from "metropolitan-colonial axis".

==== Second Model ====
The second model is the "race-based" model, which proposes that race is a feature of economic and political discrimination and draws together writers of different diaspora. It is this sharing of characteristics that allow writers of African diaspora; African Americans, Afro-Caribbeans, and other nationalities to write on the African nation. This is further addressed in the "Black writing" model.

==== Third Model ====
The third model is the comparative model, which tries to account for linguistic, historical, and cultural characteristics across the literature of two or more postcolonial countries. Some postcolonial critics have found thematic parallels between different literatures written in English such as the theme of celebration of the struggle towards independence in community and the individual. Other critics have also found that postcolonial literature is not limited to thematic parallel but also stylistic techniques such as the use of allegory, irony, and magical realism, which also characterize postcolonial writing.

==== Fourth Model ====
The fourth model is the comparative model, which looks at features such as cultural hybridity, drawing upon the works of Homi K. Bhabha, and syncretism (the blending of cultures and ideas) as the necessary components for all postcolonial literatures. The authors state that both literary theorists and cultural historians are now recognizing that syncreticity is potentially the destination point to the previous pursuit of one nation's conquest to dominate another nation—culturally, politically, and in postcolonial literatures.

=== Chapter 2: Re-placing language: textual strategies in post-colonial writing ===
In Chapter 2, the authors cover the process where language is used as a discursive practice to understand the self and make sense of one's culture. Language is a textual strategy in postcolonial writing. In this chapter, the authors cover the topic of "Re-Placing Language" using different strategies in postcolonial writings: "abrogation and appropriation". Abrogation is the rejection by postcolonial writers of a normative concept of "correct" English and the concepts of inferior "dialects" as well as the reworking of well-known texts to change their meaning. Abrogation allows for poly-dialectical cultures to exist. Appropriation is the term used by the authors to describe the reconstitution of language of the center and to remold language to its new usage. Further, appropriation is a process to "convey in a language that is not one's own the spirit that is one's own." (Raja Rao 1938) The authors explain that all postcolonial literature is cross-cultural as it attempts to negotiate the gap between them through the processes of abrogation and appropriation.

Drawing upon a dominant example of poly-dialectical culture is the working of the Creole Continuum with its specific application to the Caribbean. This theory offers a clear picture of how fast abrogating moving in the post-colonial literature. The metonymic function of language variance also abrogates the "correct" English by using a language that chooses to show a difference in order to for the colonized people to convey a sense of power and reclaim their identities whilst using a sameness to allow the language to be understood.

Glossing and untranslated words are used to convey a sense of cultural distinctiveness. The fusion of linguistic structures of two languages are further textual strategies used in postcolonial writing to replace language. All strategies discussed in this chapter enable the writers to produce texts that are culturally distinct and different although they are written in "English." In this manner, the authors feel that the postcolonial writers have contributed greatly to the "reformation" of English literature.

=== Chapter 3: Re-placing the text: the liberation of post-colonial writing ===
Chapter 3 covers "re-placing the text" which gives rise to the liberation of post-colonial writing. The authors establish how postcolonial writing combines with both the social and "material" practices of colonialism through the "symptomatic" readings of a number of texts. That is, how culture shapes and determines a reader's understanding of the text. Appropriation is stated as the one strategy that has had the most influence on postcolonial writing. By the author's readings of various postcolonial scholarship and novels, they have attempted to identify the various "theoretical shifts in the development of post-colonial writing."

Under the heading "Colonialism and Silence", Lewis Nkosi's novel Mating Birds (1986) is provided as an example whereby silence is led by the cultural conditions in South Africa and the manner in which the state controls the means of communication. The "silence" experienced in South Africa is evident in their newspapers, journals, and much of their literature writings. This silence precedes the process of appropriation.

Authenticity and the position that only particular types of experience can be regarded as "true" literature are covered through the examination of V.S. Naipaul's, a post-colonial writer from Trinidad, The Mimic Men (1967). Naipaul expresses in this literary work his view that the imitating of colonized societies of their culture and language to that of the "colonisers" can be disabling and that soon "truth", "reality", and "order" become illusions.

Further in Chapter 3, the authors cover the topic of abrogating "authenticity" through the study of a short story by Michael Anthony Sandra Street. This entire piece of work is about the abrogation of those experiences which have been regarded as "authentic". The authors challenge the process by which "authenticity" of culture is granted by the centre, colonizer, and oppressor, instead arguing for a repatriation of culture through abrogation.

The liberation of postcolonial writing is further examined through Timothy Findley in his book Not Wanted on the Voyage. In this text, Findley has extended the method of "writing back" by rewriting the story of Noah and the flood by changing the story, not to one of redemption but to one of marginalization and destruction. Further symptomatic readings in this Chapter include Janet Frame's (Frame 1962) The Edge of the Alphabet and R.K. Narayan's (1967) The Vendor of Sweets, both of which assist the authors in identifying the symptomatic and distinctive features of their analysis of postcolonial writings.

=== Chapter 4: Theory at the crossroads: indigenous theory and post-colonial reading ===
Chapter 4 discusses indigenous theory and postcolonial reading, which the authors cover under the heading of "Theory at the Crossroads". They acknowledge that all postcolonial countries still have "native" cultures that are widespread and range across the different and varied cultures. The authors are of the opinion that "received" English has always been a real problem for writers and that the preferred language is synonymous with indigenous attitudes when it comes to the actual role of literature in any society.

They state that a number of writers feel that the indigenous languages have been changed and hybridized due to the presence of the attempt to debunk ideas that have become entrenched as a result of colonialism. This can be attributed to the age of not only a rapid language change but also the enormous influence media has today on ordinary speech and cultural habits. This has made it difficult for some writers when they are attempting to revisit appropriation.

An example is given referencing R. Parthasarthy (1977:44), a poet who decided to return to writing in his native Tamil after years of writing in English. Contemporary criticism of Indian writing in English in this chapter states that writing in English only accounts for a small part of contemporary Indian writing. It is stated that the work produced by contemporary writers using their indigenous languages was far superior in quality and quantity to the work produced in English.

Negritude and "Black Literature" was further covered in this chapter as an extension from Chapter 1's "Black Writing Model". The white cultures of the settler colonies of the United States, Canada, Australia, and New Zealand have accumulated a huge number of literary studies and individual literary traditions. This has meant that colonizer literature has often dominated the English literary canon and diminishing colonized voices as inferior or intellectually incompatible.

A number of questions that have been raised in relation to these settler colonies, who are at the crossroads, focus on the tensions that are present in all postcolonial literatures. Namely, the connection that exists between social and literary practices in both the old world and the new world, the relationship that exists between the indigenous peoples in "settled" areas and the invading settlers and finally the relationship that exists between the "new" language and the new settlement.

=== Chapter 5: Replacing theory: post-colonial writing and literacy theory ===
The authors complicate the notion of European settles in the Americans, Australia and New Zealand as establishing their own "indigeneity" given that they were not the "first nation" of people to live on the land. The authors suggest that settler colonies had to create the indigenous to discover their "original relation with the universe." The issue differs when understanding the Indians' and Africans' claim to indigeneity who had to reconstruct their culture at the end of colonial rule.

The topics of language, place and theory and indigenous textuality are covered by exploring the more detailed issues surrounding the relationship between the indigenous and the settler communities. The Caribbean theories are discussed at length since the worst features of colonialism occurred in these areas, including the complete annihilation of the Caribs and the Arawaks.

Chapter 5 looks at replacing the theory around postcolonial writing and literacy by examining the broader implications of postcolonialism surrounding the roles of language for not only literary theory but also for social and political analysis. This chapter covers the different theories of modernism and the colonial experiences, with emphasis placed on the discovery of African culture in the 1980s and the 1990s. Before the "discovery", Africa had no literature of note and their art and social systems could not be recognized by European critics. Africa seemed to be one nation where modernization did not depend on postcolonization. The New Criticism movement was established in order to in order to legitimize the US's literary canon to prevent the overriding influence of English tradition. This was not without criticisms. Some arguments have been put forward to question whether or not American culture is postcolonial. The authors have used the works of Michel Foucault to cover the discourse theory which has helped them to discover the series of "rules" required for determining postcoloniality. Counter discourse, Richard Terdiman (1985) and the postcolonial theories of ideology are covered in detail.

Language, concepts of speech, political issues, and social changes are all important in feminist theory. The idea of the "other" under colonialist theory is represented in this book with the struggle to express their experiences in the language of their oppressors and as a result, have had to create a language of their own. Postcolonial feminism is a study that understands women to have been "othered" who have been colonized and even forced into positions of warfare in order to rebel against imperialism and yet have been removed from any discussions. The authors draw upon Spivak's theory of the subaltern who is doubly suppressed by her gender and her race. The meaning and value of literature, a complex issue, is discussed as the authors ponder not only what should enter the canon but also what texts should be classified as "literature", given that many of these texts have been altered as writers add their own traditional forms of expressions to the inherited English language acquired through colonization.

This book perceives postcoloniation as a reading strategy. It suggests that "a canon is not a body of texts per se, but rather a set of reading practices" (Ashcroft, et al. p. 186) that incorporates conventions about genre, literature, and about writing. The authors have used Shakespeare's The Tempest as an example of a text that has been reworked as a model for postcolonial readings of canonical works.

=== Chapter 6: Re-thinking the post-colonial: post-colonialism in the twenty first century ===
Chapter 6 has the authors rethinking postcolonialism in the twenty-first century. The authors concede that postcolonial theory is perhaps one of the most diverse issues in literary and cultural studies. They state that many other disciplines have used the term "post-colonial" to illustrate concerns in a number of fields including politics, sociology, and economic theory, although not all have been positive in their acceptance. The Empire Writes Back uses these theoretical frameworks to understand how postcolonialism acknowledge that the colonized are continually living under an oppressive system wherein they are unable to eradicate colonial influence.

The book arose from the works of African, Caribbean, and Indian writers and artists who were discussing and debating postcolonialism and had already started "writing back" in order to recuperate and re-acknowledge the precolonial parts of their identities. Colonial countries that produce literary texts in English translation, from native languages to common world languages such as English, is a topic that is debated regularly, specifically by Ngũgĩ wa Thiong'o in his writing on the "cultural bomb".

In the twenty-first century, in connection with postcolonialism, the authors have covered the relationship of the following ideas: postcolonialism and cultural studies, local conditions, traditional and sacred beliefs of the colonized peoples, animals and the environment and globalization. It concludes by analyzing that, while traditional globalization increased the process of cultural imperialism, our "neo-globalisation" has actually facilitated a disturbance of Eurocentric dominance as a diaspora of writers have been able to "write back" to the impact of the colonial phenomenon; slavery, indenture, and settlement.
