= Arab states of the Persian Gulf =

Overview of the Gulf Arab States

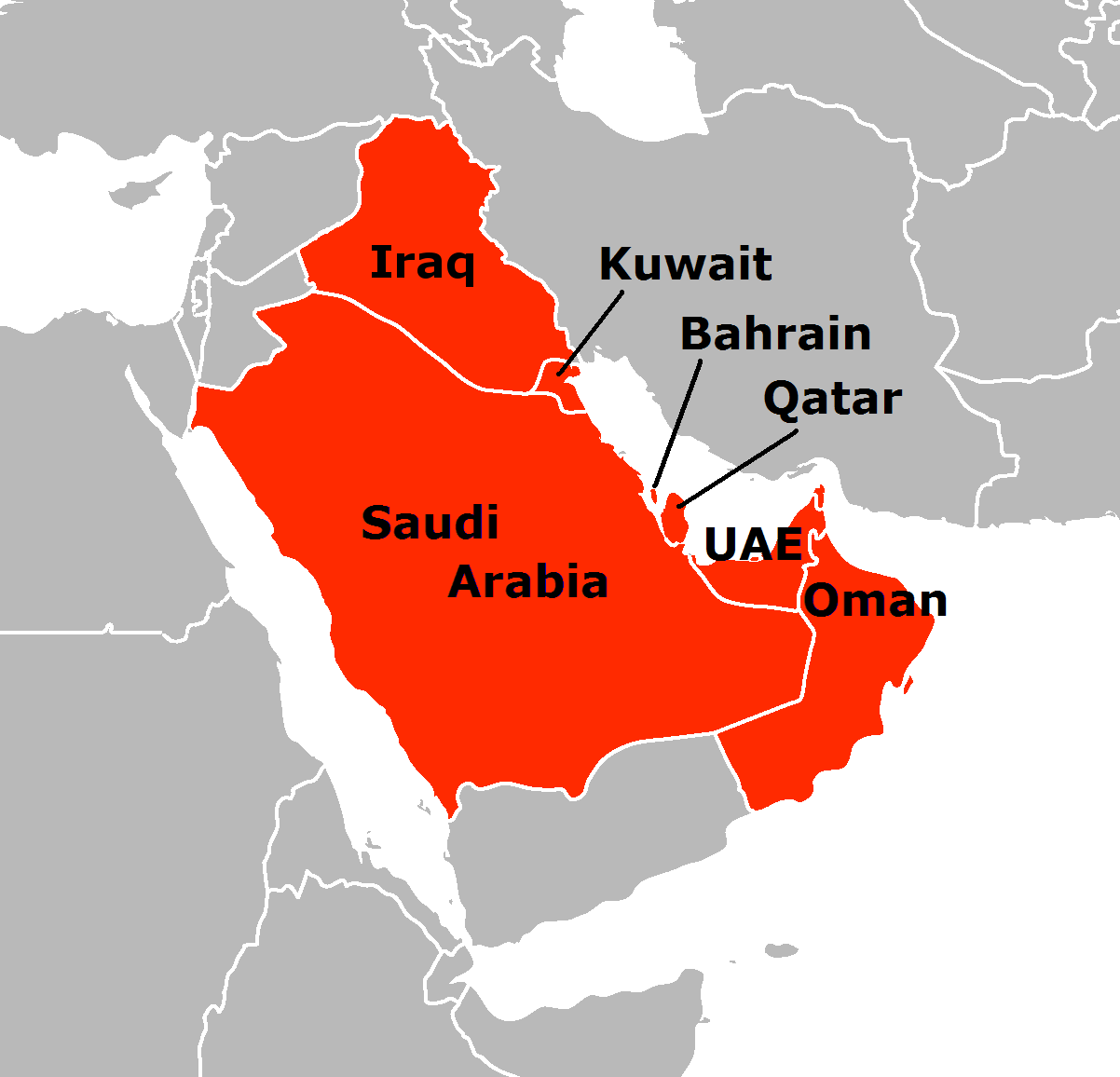
Arab states of the Persian Gulf

The Arab states of the Persian Gulf, commonly referred to as the Gulf Arab States, (Note: دول الخليج العربية duwal al-khalīj al-ʿarabiyyah,) comprise Bahrain, Iraq, Kuwait, Oman, Qatar, Saudi Arabia, and the United Arab Emirates. These seven Arab states are grouped together on the basis of their coastal boundaries with the Persian Gulf. The Gulf touches the coast of every state in the Arabian Peninsula except for Yemen. Oman's only coastline on the Persian Gulf is in the small Musandam exclave, which juts into the southern side of the Strait of Hormuz, while the northern coastline of mainland Oman faces the Gulf of Oman.

Excluding the Republic of Iraq, all Arab states of the Persian Gulf are Islamic monarchies and members of the Gulf Cooperation Council (GCC), which promotes political and economic integration alongside joint defense and security under its Unified Military Command. Most of the Gulf Arab states formerly existed as British protectorates until the late 20th century.

== History ==
=== Early modern period ===
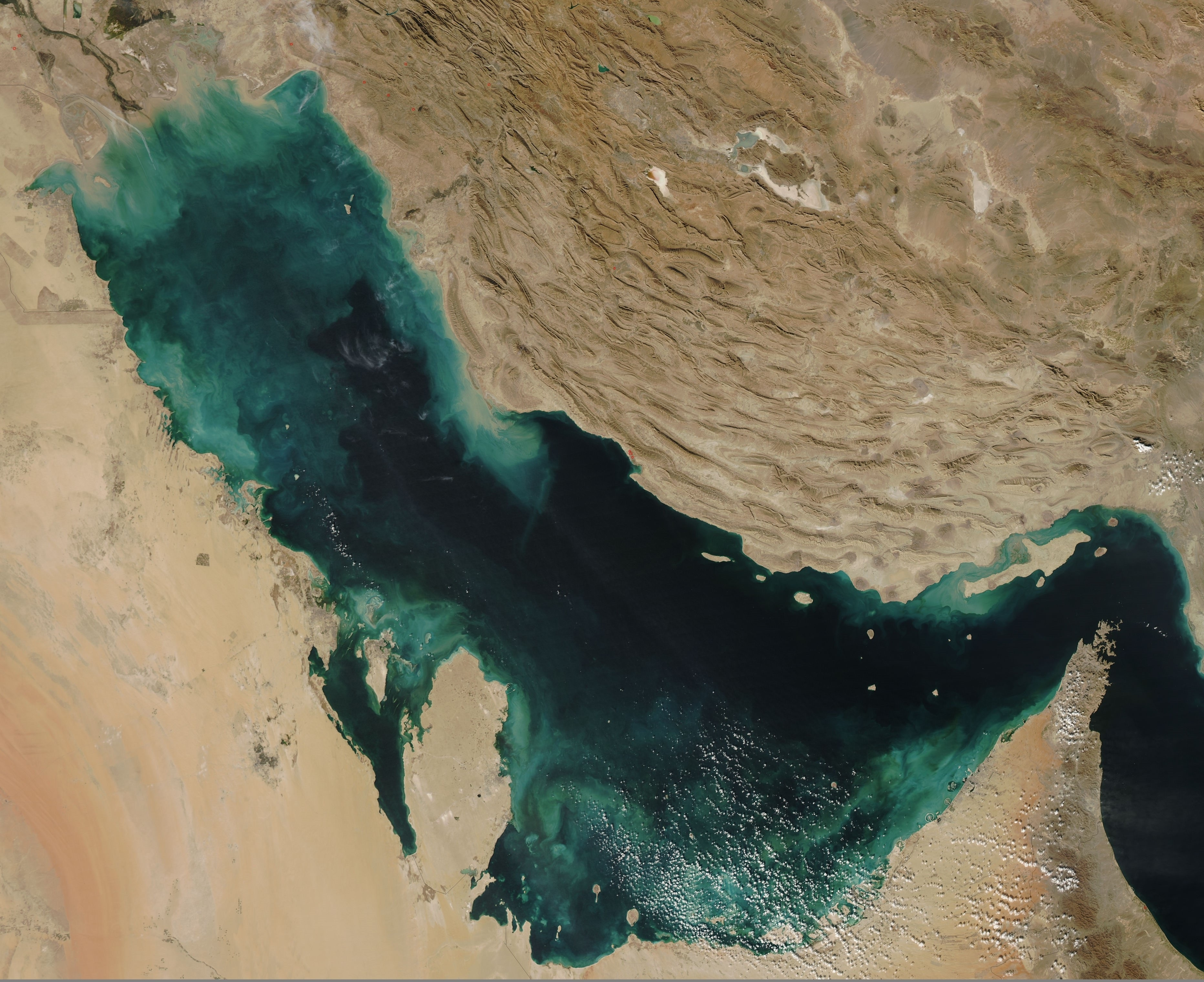
Satellite view of the Persian Gulf

The Arab ruling dynasties in Kuwait and Bahrain are descended from Bani Utbah, whose origins lie in central Arabia, particularly the Najd region. During a prolonged drought in the 17th century, the Utub clans migrated from their homeland, traveling through Al Aflaj, Qatif, and Al Ahsa and eventually reaching Freiha in northwestern Qatar. After a while in Iraq, they migrated to Kuwait and established the Emirate of Kuwait under the Al Sabah family in the mid-18th century. In the mid-18th century, the current ruling family of Bahrain – the Al Khalifa – migrated from Kuwait to Qatar, where they established a thriving town in Zubarah. Following the Bani Utbah invasion of Bahrain in 1783, in which Zubarah-based tribes conquered the Bahrain islands from the Persians, the Al Khalifa assumed control of both Bahrain and Zubarah, with Ahmed bin Muhammad bin Khalifa ruling from the latter until his death in 1796. His heirs would rule from Bahrain, where they continued to exert authority over mainland Qatar. The Al Khalifa signed a treaty with the British in 1820, guaranteeing their recognition as Bahrain's rulers.

The Al Thani, who are descended from Banu Tamim—which also originated in central Arabia—settled in Qatar around the 1720s. Their first settlement in Qatar was in the southern town of Sikak, and from there they moved north-west to Zubarah, Al Ruwais and then to Fuwayrit. They settled in Doha in the 19th century under their leader Mohammed bin Thani. While the Al Khalifa continued to view Qatar as a dependency, Mohammed bin Thani, began to gain significant political weight on the peninsula after the tribe migrated from Fuwayrit to Al Bidda in 1848. Their rise in influence was precipitated by the Battle of Mesaimeer in 1851, in which Thani led local Qatari tribes to defect from Bahrain to the Emirate of Nejd prior to a peace deal preserving the status quo, resulting in a power struggle between the Al Khalifa and the Al Thani over the proceeding years. In 1868, the Qatari–Bahraini War resulted in the independence of Qatar from Bahrain, which was recognized by the British.

The Al Qasimi, a Huwala dynasty which embraced Wahhabism and became a close ally of the Emirate of Diriyah in central Arabia, emerged as a maritime power based both in Ras Al Khaimah on the southern shore of the Persian Gulf and Qeshm Island, Bandar Abbas and Bandar Lingeh on the northern shore by the early 19th century. Around 1727, the Al Qasimi clan took control of Sharjah and declared the polity independent. The Qawasim were a powerful naval force and sought to end the rising European colonial infiltration on their trade and commercial routes. The Al Nahyan have ruled Abu Dhabi since 1793 and the Al Maktoum have ruled Dubai since 1833; both originated from the Bani Yas tribal confederation, which originated in the Najd region of central Arabia. The Emirate of Fujairah was annexed by the Qawasim of Sharjah from the Omani Empire in 1850, which later seceded under Al Sharqi.

=== British colonial era ===
Prior to the advent of the British, piracy in the Persian Gulf was prevalent throughout much of the 18th and 19th centuries. Many of the most notable historical instances of piracy were perpetrated by the Al Qasimi. This led to the British mounting the Persian Gulf campaigns of 1809 and 1819, the latter of which resulted in the signing of the General Maritime Treaty of 1820 between the British and the Sheikhs of what was then known as the "Pirate Coast". From 1763 until 1971, the British Empire maintained varying degrees of political control over Arab states in the Persian Gulf in the form of protectorates through the British Residency of the Persian Gulf, such as the Trucial States (now the United Arab Emirates), as well as Bahrain, Kuwait, Oman, and Qatar. The House of Saud, meanwhile, remained largely independent of foreign control and proceeded to expand across the Arabian Peninsula while receiving British military support for these campaigns. Iraq, which had been under Ottoman control since the 16th century, was brought under British control following the Mesopotamian campaign of World War I. The campaign led to the occupation of Baghdad in 1917 and the establishment of the British Mandate of Mesopotamia.

=== Post-independence ===
The Persian Gulf was a battlefield of the 1980–1988 Iran–Iraq War, during which Gulf Arab states financially supported Saddam Hussein's Iraq against Iran. Gulf Arab states such as Kuwait and Saudi Arabia engaged in the Tanker war. The United States intervened in the conflict in 1986 to protect Kuwaiti tankers, and engaged in a confrontation with Iran. The United States' role in the Persian Gulf grew in the second half of the 20th century. On 3 July 1988, Iran Air Flight 655 was shot down by the U.S. military (which had mistaken the Airbus A300 operating the flight for an Iranian F-14 Tomcat) while it was flying over the Persian Gulf, killing all 290 people on board. In 1991, the region witnessed the Gulf War, the largely air- and land-based conflict that followed the Iraqi invasion of Kuwait in 1990. The U.S.-led Gulf war coalition was joined by all Gulf Arab states, which offered the U.S. a military launchpad against Iraq, prompting the Iraqi ballistic missile strikes on Saudi Arabia. In 2003, Gulf states opposed the United States-led invasion of Iraq, with the exception of Kuwait, which strongly supported the invasion and provided financial and logistical support.

Following the outbreak of the 2026 Iran war started by joint U.S.–Israeli strikes on Iran from 28 February 2026, all Arab states of the Persian Gulf were exposed to Iranian attacks on their critical energy infrastructure and U.S. bases on their territory. According to diplomats, GCC states, particularly Saudi Arabia, supported continued strikes on Iran until the Iranian threat is reduced through changes in the Iranian leadership or a shift in Iranian behavior, while the United Arab Emirates, Kuwait, and Bahrain supported a ground invasion of Iran; Qatar and Oman favor diplomatic solutions. Saudi Arabia, Kuwait, and the UAE have reportedly been discreetly attacking Iran and Iranian-backed militias in Iraq throughout the war. The attacks included an Emirati strike on an oil refinery on Lavan Island. Iraq meanwhile has condemned the U.S.–Israeli strikes on Iran and attacks on Iranian-backed militias in Iraq such as the Popular Mobilization Forces, and called on the PMF to respond to such attacks. The impact of the Iran war has significantly damaged Gulf economies in the long term, having caused up to US$58 billion of damage according to estimates.

== Politics ==
Gulf monarchies have developed what political scientists term a "tribal dynastic monarchy" system, which distinguishes them from other Middle Eastern monarchical systems. This governance model emerged from traditional chieftaincies and incorporates two key mechanisms: "balanced opposition", where power is distributed among tribal groups; and "affiliation solidarity", which maintains cohesion through kinship networks. This system has enabled ruling families to adapt traditional authority structures to modern state institutions, contributing to their resilience compared to other Middle Eastern monarchies that were overthrown in the twentieth century and throughout the Arab Cold War.

Some of the Gulf Arab states are constitutional monarchies with elected parliaments, including Bahrain (al-Majlis al-Watani) and Kuwait (Majlis al-Ummah) which have legislatures with members elected by the population.

The Sultanate of Oman has an advisory council (Majlis ash-Shura) that is popularly elected. In the United Arab Emirates, a federation of seven monarchical emirates, the Federal National Council functions as an advisory body. Half of its members are indirectly elected by the hand-picked 33% of Emirati citizens who have voting rights through an electoral college, while the other half are directly appointed by the rulers of each emirate.

Neither Saudi Arabia nor Qatar has held national legislative elections in the sense of a fully elected parliament: Saudi Arabia has no national legislature elected by voters, with the Shura Council remaining appointed; while Qatar held a partial Shura Council election in 2021 with only two thirds of seats elected, but in 2024 moved to abolish those elections altogether and revert to a fully appointed Shura Council. Iraq is the only federal republic situated in the Persian Gulf.

The Gulf Arab States all follow a standard nomenclature for the sea they border, calling it the Arabian Gulf. This has resulted in a longstanding dispute over the name, the Persian Gulf naming dispute. In May 2025 American president Donald Trump announced he would support changing the name of the Persian Gulf to Arabian Gulf.

=== Freedom of the press ===
Freedom of the press is severely restricted in the Arab states of the Persian Gulf. In the 2025 World Press Freedom Index of Reporters Without Borders, all Gulf Arab states are ranked in the bottom third of the 180 countries examined, with the exception of Qatar, which ranks 79th. However, Qatar too is described as having a "draconian system of censorship", with multiple topics being "completely off limits" and with media coverage of critical regional events often "directly aligned with the Qatari government's official stance".

=== Peace index ===
Arab countries in the Persian Gulf region, and especially Qatar, stand accused of funding militant Islamist organizations, such as Hamas and the Muslim Brotherhood. According to the 2025 Global Peace Index of the Institute for Economics and Peace (IEP), the seven countries had varying degrees of success in maintaining peace amongst their respective borders, with Qatar ranked first amongst its regional peers as the most peaceful regional and Middle Eastern nation (and 27th worldwide), while Kuwait ranks second in both the Persian Gulf and the wider Middle East (31st worldwide), followed by Oman in the third spot (52nd worldwide). On the other end, Iraq was ranked last among the Gulf Arab States, at 16th in the Middle East and 147th worldwide.

== Economy ==
The economies of the Arab states of the Persian Gulf are historically characterized by a heavy reliance on hydrocarbons, with oil and gas exports forming the backbone of national revenues and foreign exchange earnings. According to data from the United States Congressional Research Service, oil revenues accounted for upwards of 40% of GDP in key states such as Saudi Arabia and the UAE around 2000. While these states hold a large share of global oil and gas reserves — for instance nearly 65% of world oil reserves and 34% of proven gas reserves at the turn of the millennium — their dependence on this sector has exposed them to substantial volatility in global energy markets.

In recent years, the region has stepped up efforts to diversify away from hydrocarbons, with non-oil activities becoming an increasingly important driver of growth. A World Bank report notes that in 2024 the non-oil sectors of Gulf Cooperation Council (GCC) economies achieved growth of roughly 4% to 4.6% in major states, supporting broader GDP recovery. Furthermore, non-oil sectors accounted for some 73% of GDP in the first quarter of 2025 among GCC states, indicating that diversification is shifting from aspiration to tangible reality. These sectors include tourism, logistics, manufacturing, financial services and real-estate, and are backed by large-scale infrastructure investment and reforms to attract foreign investment.

Despite these advances, hydrocarbon revenues remain critical to government budgets and fiscal balances across the region. For example, earlier studies note that hydrocarbon income still accounted for around 60-90% of government revenues in states like Kuwait and Saudi Arabia. The ability of the states to reduce vulnerability to oil-price swings depends on the successful implementation of structural reforms, increased non-oil exports and the deepening of private-sector investment.

== See also ==
- Persian Gulf naming dispute
  - Arab League–Iran relations
- Territorial disputes in the Persian Gulf
- Arabian Peninsula
  - Eastern Arabia
- Gulf Arabic
