= Bill Ashcroft (author) =

Australian writer and academic

- Born: 28 April 1946 (age 80)
- Citizenship: Australia
- Occupations: Writer, critic and theorist
- Notable work: The Empire Writes Back

Bill Ashcroft is an Australian literary theorist, critic, and an emeritus professor at the University of New South Wales (UNSW). He is recognized as a founding exponent of post-colonial theory. Alongside Gareth Griffiths and Helen Tiffin, he co-wrote the 1989 text, The Empire Writes Back, which was the first major work to systematically outline and define the field of post-colonial studies.

He was elected a Fellow of the Australian Academy of the Humanities in 2015.
