= Gareth Griffiths (academic) =

Australian literary scholar

Gareth Griffiths FAHA (born 1943) is a Welsh-born academic, emeritus professor of English and cultural studies at the University of Western Australia.

== Life ==
Griffiths was born in Wales, and educated at Cyfarthfa Grammar School. Apart from a period as chair at SUNY Albany, he has been based in Australia since 1973. He has also taught at Macquarie University in Sydney and in the United Kingdom and France. From 2002 to 2005 he chaired the English Department at SUNY Albany in the United States. He is a fellow of the Australian Academy of the Humanities. He has previously held positions as Head of the Theatre Studies Council of Australia and Western Australian theatre reviewer for The Australian newspaper.

Griffiths's work has primarily focused on postcolonial literature and theory, a topic on which he has been an influential contributor. He has published on the literatures of diverse third world and postcolonial spaces but his work has most significantly dealt with East and West Africa. He has also published significant works on the intersection of land and identity. His current research is on ideas of the secular and the sacred in the postcolonial world and on US/African relations in the 19th century.

== Selected works ==
- (ed.) John Romeril. Rodopi, 1993.
- A Double Exile: African and West Indian Writing Between Two Culture. Boyars, 1978.
- (with Bill Ashcroft and Helen Tiffin) The Empire Writes Back: Post-Colonial Literatures, Theory & Practice. Routledge, 1989; revised edition, 2002.
- (with Bill Ashcroft and Helen Tiffin) Key Concepts in Post-Colonial Studies. Routledge, 1998.
- African Literatures in English: East and West. Routledge 2000.
- (ed. with David S. Trigger). Disputed Territories: Land, Culture and Identity in Settler Societies. Hong Kong University Press, 2003.
- (ed. with Jamie S. Scott). Mixed Messages: Materiality, Textuality, Missions. Palgrave, 2005.
- (with Bill Ashcroft and Helen Tiffin) The Post-Colonial Studies Reader. Routledge, 2006.
