= Culture and Conflict in the Middle East =

2008 book by Philip Carl Salzman

- First edition cover
- Author: Philip Carl Salzman
- Language: English
- Subject: Middle Eastern studies, conflict management, anthropology
- Genre: Non-fiction
- Publisher: Humanities Press (Humanity Books)
- Publication date: December 31, 2007
- Publication place: United States
- Media type: Print (Hardcover)
- Pages: 224
- ISBN: 978-1-59102-587-0

Culture and Conflict in the Middle East is a 2008 book by Philip Carl Salzman, an emeritus professor of Anthropology at McGill University and senior fellow of the Frontier Centre for Public Policy, a Canadian thinktank associated with free-market, conservative political thought.

Culture and Conflict is an attempt to understand Middle Eastern politics and society as an outcome of the fact that tribal organization are central to Arab culture.

== Content ==
According to Salzman, tribes conceptualized as the descendants of a common ancestor on the male line will combine their resources with other closely related relatives against more distant ones, and the whole tribe will then stand together against outsiders. This tribal framework renders it nearly impossible to have a constitution or a regime of law and order, thereby "generating a society where all groups are on an equal basis." Tribal members "are loyal only to their groups."

Tribal loyalties are said by one commentator drawing on Salzman's work to "create a complex pattern of tribal autonomy and tyrannical centralism that obstructs the development of constitutionalism, the rule of law, citizenship, gender equality, and the other prerequisites of a democratic state. Not until this archaic social system based on the family is dispatched can democracy make real headway in the Middle East."

The book examines two key systems: "balanced opposition" and "affiliation solidarity".

== Balanced Opposition ==
- Balanced Opposition: A cultural value where individuals and groups maintain a delicate balance between opposing forces, often through a complex system of alliances, rivalries, and negotiations. This balance prevents one single group from becoming too strong.

== Affiliation Solidarity ==
- Affiliation Solidarity: A cultural tendency to prioritize loyalty and support for those who are socially closer, over those who are more distant, leading to a system of alliances and rivalries based on familial proximity rather than abstract principles.

One aspect of these two systems is "collective responsibility" where one small group is required to defend itself from another small group. In a confrontation, a small group faces a small group, but this escalates based on the size of the groups from "family" up to the entire "Islamic community (umma)".

Salzman describes the hierarchy as:

1. family vs. family
2. lineage vs. lineage
3. clan vs. clan
4. tribe vs. tribe
5. confederacy vs. confederacy
6. sect vs. sect.
7. the Islamic community (umma) vs. the infidels

The book quotes a common Arab phrase, "I against my brothers; my brothers and I against our cousins; my brothers and cousins and I against the world."

== Reviews ==
Stanley Kurtz called Culture and Conflict "a major event: the most penetrating, reliable, systematic, and theoretically sophisticated effort yet made to understand the Islamist challenge the United States is facing in cultural terms." By November 2020, the book had been cited 105 times.

Zerougui Abdelkader called the book "... more polemical than scientific; its purpose seems to be to serve the political agenda of the author." and "Salzman overemphasizes the importance of religion in the way North African and Middle Eastern countries deal with others." He argues Salzman's account of tribalism may apply in "... Gulf States and to some extent Lebanon, but in no way applies to Algeria, Tunisia and Egypt." He says "Partly out of flawed logic and conceptual confusion and partly out of what appears to be deeply ingrained prejudice, he has turned the Middle East into the kind of bogeyman we are used to in the Western media and its people into a barbarous and backward horde. One would expect better from an anthropology professor."

== Influence ==
Writing in The New York Times, David Brooks drew on Salzman's work to argue that "many Middle Eastern societies are tribal. The most salient structure is the local lineage group. National leaders do not make giant sacrifices on behalf of the nation because their higher loyalty is to the sect or clan. Order is achieved not by the top-down imposition of abstract law. Instead, order is achieved through fluid balance of power agreements between local groups." Culture and conflict is cited for its explanation of one of the "obstacles" blocking "individual freedoms, civil rights, political participation, popular sovereignty, equality before the law, and representative elections" in Arab lands.
