= Philip Carl Salzman =

American anthropologist (born 1940)

- Born: 1940 (age 85–86); United States
- Education: University of Chicago
- Occupations: Anthropologist, professor emeritus
- Known for: Anthropological research on Middle Eastern cultures

Philip Carl Salzman (born c. 1940) is professor emeritus of anthropology at McGill University, Quebec, Canada.

== Background ==
Salzman graduated from Antioch College in Ohio, United States in 1962, and received his Ph.D. from the University of Chicago in 1972 with a thesis on "Adaptation and change among the Yarahmadzai Baluch". He conducted field research among pastoral peoples, first the Shah Nawazi nomadic tribe in Baluchistan (Iran), then with the Bharawadin Reika pastoralists in Gujarat and Rajasthani in India, and finally the Sardinians in Italy. He is retired from McGill University, and is a senior fellow of the Frontier Centre for Public Policy, a Canadian thinktank associated with free-market and conservative political thought.

== Focus ==
Salzman has a particular interest in the study of social change, and in "the ways in which particular groups have transformed over time." He perceives change as "part of social organization rather than extraneous to it." His book Culture and Conflict in the Middle East elucidates this approach, arguing that Western colonial influences are less important in explanations of change than the culture and social dynamics of the region's societies. According to the Assyrian International News Agency, he demonstrates "how the dual pattern of tribal self-rule and tyrannical centralism continues to define life in the Middle East, and [uses] it to explain the region's most characteristic features, such as autocracy, political mercilessness, and economic stagnancy. It accounts ... for ... Islam's 'bloody borders' – the widespread hostility toward non-Muslims."

== Selected positions ==
Salzman has adopted a conservative stance in policy debates in North America, saying he holds "classical liberal values". He is strongly opposed to affirmative action on grounds of gender and race in higher education. He argues in a 2020 commentary that "The Woke Revolution is really about a power grab, through destroying liberal American institutions and culture and replacing them with a Marxist-inspired identity class struggle, socialism, and a totalitarian culture that cancels any opposition. This is now the agenda of our universities, of 'progressive' politicians and office holders, and of the rioting mobs in the streets." He is opposed to socialist government: "Socialism's sham absolute equality destroys prosperity, freedom and democracy." His 2019 book, Feminism and Injustice, challenges the social construction of gender, women's right to abortion, single motherhood, and commonly held visions of "social justice".

== Selected publications ==
=== Books ===
- 2020 Understanding Universities. Self-published with Bookbaby.
- 2019 Feminism and Injustice. Self-published with Bookbaby.
- 2012 Classic Comparative Anthropology: Studies from the Tradition. Prospect Heights, IL: Waveland.
- 2008 Postcolonial Theory and the Arab-Israeli Conflict. Edited with Donna Robinson Divine. Routledge.
- 2007 Culture and Conflict in the Middle East. Humanity (Prometheus) Press.
- 2007 Thinking Anthropologically: a practical guide for students. Second Edition, edited with Pat Rice. Upper Saddle River: Prentice-Hall. (first edition, 2003)
- 2004 Pastoralism: Equality, Hierarchy, And The State. Boulder, CO: Westview Press.
- 2001 Understanding Culture: An Introduction To Anthropological Theory. Prospect Heights, IL: Waveland. (Reviewed: JRAI 8 [4]:809, 2002)
- 2000 Black Tents Of Baluchistan. Washington, D.C.: Smithsonian Institution Press. Winner of the Premio Pitrè–Salomone Marino.
- 1999 The Anthropology Of Real Life: Events In Human Experience. Prospect Heights, IL: Waveland.
- 1992 Kin And Contract In Baluchi Herding Camps. Baluchistan Monograph Series II. Naples: Istituto Universitario Orientale & Istituto Italiano per Il Medeo ed Estremo Oriente.
- 1990 Nomadic Peoples In A Changing World. P.C. Salzman and J.G. Galaty (eds.). Naples: Istituto Universitario Orientale.
- 1982 Contemporary Nomadic And Pastoral Peoples: North Africa, Asia, And The North. P.C. Salzman (ed.).
- 1982 Contemporary Nomadic And Pastoral Peoples: Africa And Latin America. P.C. Salzman (ed.).
- 1981 Change And Development In Nomadic And Pastoral Societies. J.G. Galaty and P.C. Salzman (eds.). Leiden: Brill.
- 1981 The Future Of Pastoral Peoples J.G. Galaty, D.R. Aronson, and P.C. Salzman (eds.). Ottawa: International Development Research Centre.
- 1980 When Nomads Settle: Processes Of Sedentarization As Adaptation And Response. P.C. Salzman (ed.). Bergin/ Praeger.

=== Articles ===
- 2005 "The Iron Law of Politics," Politics And The Life Sciences 23(2):20-49, August
- 2002 "On Reflexivity," American Anthropologist 104(3):805-813.
- 2002 "Pastoral Nomads: Some General Observations Based on Research in Iran", Journal of Anthropological Research 58(2):245-264.
- 2001 "Toward a Balanced Approach to the Study of Equality", CURRENT ANTHROPOLOGY 42(2): 281–284.
- 2000 "Hierarchical Image and Reality: The Construction of a Tribal Chiefship", Comparative Studies In Society And History 42 (1):49-66.
- 1999 "Is Inequality Universal?", Current Anthropology 40 (1): 31–61.
