= Postcolonial Theory and the Arab–Israeli Conflict =

2008 book by Ed Morgan

- Author: Philip Carl Salzman and Donna Robinson Divine
- Publisher: Routledge Press
- Publication date: October 21, 2008
- Pages: 262
- ISBN: 9780415495769

Postcolonial Theory and the Arab–Israeli Conflict is a 2008 book edited by Philip Carl Salzman and Donna Robinson Divine and published by Routledge Press. The book is based on the proceedings of a conference on "Postcolonial Theory and the Middle East" held at Case Western Reserve University in 2005. The essays were first published in a special issue of the journal Israel Affairs.

== Contents ==
The book contains the following essays:

- Irfan Khawaja, “Essentialism, Consistency, and Islam: A Critique of Edward Said’s Orientalism”
- Ronald Niezen, “Postcolonialism and the Utopian Imagination”
- Ed Morgan, “Orientalism and the Foreign Sovereign: Today I am a Man of Law”
- Laurie Zoloth, “Mistaken-ness and the Nature of the ‘Post”: The Ethics and the Inevitability of Error in theoretical Work"
- Herbert Lewis, “The Influence of Edward Said and Orientalism on Anthropology, or: Can the Anthropologist Speak?”
- Gerald M. Steinberg, “Postcolonial theory and the Ideology of Peace Studies”
- Efraim Karsh, “The Missing Piece: Islamic Imperialism”
- David Cook, “The Muslim Man’s Burden: Muslim Intellectuals Confront their Imperialist Past”
- Andrew Bostom, “Negating the Legacy of Jihad in Palestine”
- Philip Carl Salzman, “Arab Culture and Postcolonial Theory”
- Richard Landes, “Edward Said and the Culture of Honour and Shame: Orientalism and our Misperceptions of the Arab–Israeli Conflict”
- Gideon Shimoni, “Postcolonial Theory and the History of Zionism”
- S. Ilan Troen, “De-Judaising the Homeland: Academic Politics in Re-Writing the History of Palestine”
- Donna Robinson Divine, “The Middle East Conflict and its Postcolonial Discontents”
- Irwin J. Mansdorf, “The Political Psychology of Postcolonial Ideology in the Arab World: an analysis of ‘Occupation’ and the ‘Right of Return’"
