= Donna Robinson Divine =

American political scientist

- Born: 1941 (age 84–85)

Academic background
- Education: Brandeis University; Columbia University

Donna Robinson Divine (born 1941) is the Morningstar Family Professor in Jewish Studies and Professor of Government at Smith College. She holds a B.A. from Brandeis University, 1963, and a Ph.D. from Columbia University, 1971, in Political Science. Divine has worked in the fields of Comparative Politics, Middle Eastern Politics, and Political Theory.

Divine is fluent in three of the major languages of the Middle East, Arabic, Hebrew, and Turkish.. She conducts research about the Middle East, studying both historical developments and contemporary trends.

She has written on Zionist immigration to Palestine during the British Mandate, analyzing how exile functioned as a contrast to the society created in Palestine during the period of British rule.

According to Efraim Karsh, Divine sees many common links between Zionist state building and the situation facing the Palestinians, comparing the roles of the Histadrut in Israel with that of Hamas and other voluntary bodies in the Palestinian "entity". She asserts that the Palestinians in the West Bank and Gaza "have created a more vibrant civil society than at any other time in their history".

Divine said that with their attention directed to explaining the loss of a Palestinian state in 1948, scholars have failed to appreciate Palestine's nineteenth century history as a period of significant development.

Divine is a feminist and has worked to expand women's rights and opportunities in the American academy and in the Middle East through her scholarship. Divine has also written and spoken about the Australian TV series A Place to Call Home. She has co-edited a book about the series that describes the impact of the series on its fans from across the globe. (Note: See A Place to Call Home: The Story of How a TV Series Stirred Passions and Connections (ISBN 9781098390037))

== Books ==
- Women Living Change: Cross-Cultural Perspectives. Essays from the Smith College Research Project on Women and Social Change. Edited with Susan C. Bourque. Temple University Press, 1985.
- Politics and Society in Ottoman Palestine: The Arab Struggle for Survival and Power. Lynne Rienner, 1994.
- Postcolonial Theory and the Arab-Israeli Conflict. Edited with Philip Carl Salzman Routledge, 2008.
- Exiled in the Homeland, University of Texas Press, 2010.
- Word Crimes: Reclaiming The Language of the Israeli-Palestinian Conflict.

== Fellowships, grants, awards ==
- Named by Algemeiner newspaper as one of the top 100 people positively influencing Jewish life [2019].

Mandelbaum Scholar, University of Sydney, March 2017 invited back for 2020 Organizing Fellow, Kahn Institute for the Liberal Arts 2005-2006

- Academic Fellow, Foundation for the Defense of Democracies, 2003-2004
- Smith College Grant for Curriculum Development: Multicultural Curriculum Development
- Jean Picker Fellowship, 1982–1985
- Andrew Mellon Foundation Grants 1978–1980, 1981–1984. Principal Investigator, Smith Research Project on Women and Social Change
- National Endowment for the Humanities Fellowship for Senior Scholars, 1982–1983
- Social Science Research Council Grants, 1978–1979; 1982–1983
- Department of State Middle East Scholar in Residence, January 1978
- American Association of University Women Fellowship, 1976–1977
- Smith College Grants
- Israel Government Award, 1967–1968
- Fulbright-Hayes Fellowship, 1967–1968
- National Defense Foreign Language Fellowships, 1963–1967
- Columbia University Grant, 1966–1967
- Columbia University Presidential Fellow, 1965–1966
- New York State Regents Fellowship for College Teachers, 1964–1965
- Columbia University Middle East Scholar, 1964–1965
- Woodrow Wilson National Fellow, 1963–1964
- Phi Beta Kappa, 1962
