= Helen Tiffin =

Australian academic

Helen M. Tiffin FAHA is an adjunct professor of English at the University of Wollongong, Australia, and an influential writer in post-colonial theory and literary studies.

Tiffin returned to Australia from Canada to take up her present post at the University of Tasmania. She was formerly Professor of English and Canada Research Chair (Tier 1) in English and Post-Colonial Studies at Queen's University. Prior to her move to Canada, Tiffin held the post of Professor in the School of English, Media Studies, and Art History (EMSAH) at the University of Queensland, where she was a founder member of the Postcolonial Research Group.

Tiffin's research and teaching interests include the history of colonial and post-colonial settler societies, literatures in English, Caribbean studies, literary theory, and more recently, the literary and cultural representation of animals.

Tiffin was elected Fellow of the Australian Academy of the Humanities in 2009.

== Principal works ==
- Robert Cribb, Helen Gilbert and Helen Tiffin. Wild Man from Borneo: A Cultural History of the Orangutan. University of Hawai'i Press, 2014: shortlisted for the General History Prize, New South Wales Premier's History Awards 2015.
- Graham Huggan and Helen Tiffin. Postcolonial Ecocriticism: Literature, Animals, Environment. Routledge, 2010.
- Helen Tiffin, ed. Five Emus to the King of Siam: Environment and Empire. Rodopi, 2007.
- Bill Ashcroft, Gareth Griffiths, and Helen Tiffin. The Post-Colonial Studies Reader. Routledge, 2006.
- Bill Ashcroft, Gareth Griffiths, and Helen Tiffin. The Empire Writes Back: Post-Colonial Literatures, Theory & Practice. Routledge, 1989; revised edition, 2002.
- Bill Ashcroft, Gareth Griffiths, Helen Tiffin. Key Concepts in Post-Colonial Studies. Routledge, 1998.
- Diana Brydon and Helen Tiffin. Decolonising Fictions: Comparative Studies in Post-Colonial Literatures. Dangaroo, 1993.
- Gillian Whitlock, Helen Tiffin, John Pengwerne Matthews, eds. Re-Siting Queen's English: Text and Tradition in Post-colonial Literatures : Essays Presented to John Pengwerne Matthews. Rodopi, 1992.
- Stephen Slemon and Helen Tiffin, eds. After Europe: Critical theory and post-colonial writing. Dangaroo Press, 1990.
- Ian Adam and Helen Tiffin. Past the Last Post: Theorizing Post-colonialism and Post-modernism. University of Calgary Press, 1990.
- Chris Tiffin and Helen Tiffin. South Pacific Stories. South Pacific Association for Commonwealth Literature and Language Studies, 1980.
