= Erik Brandt =

Erik Brandt may refer to:

- Erik Gottfrid Christian Brandt (1884–1955), Swedish politician
- Erik Rud Brandt (1943–2023), Danish fashion designer
