= Nobel Prize in Literature controversies =

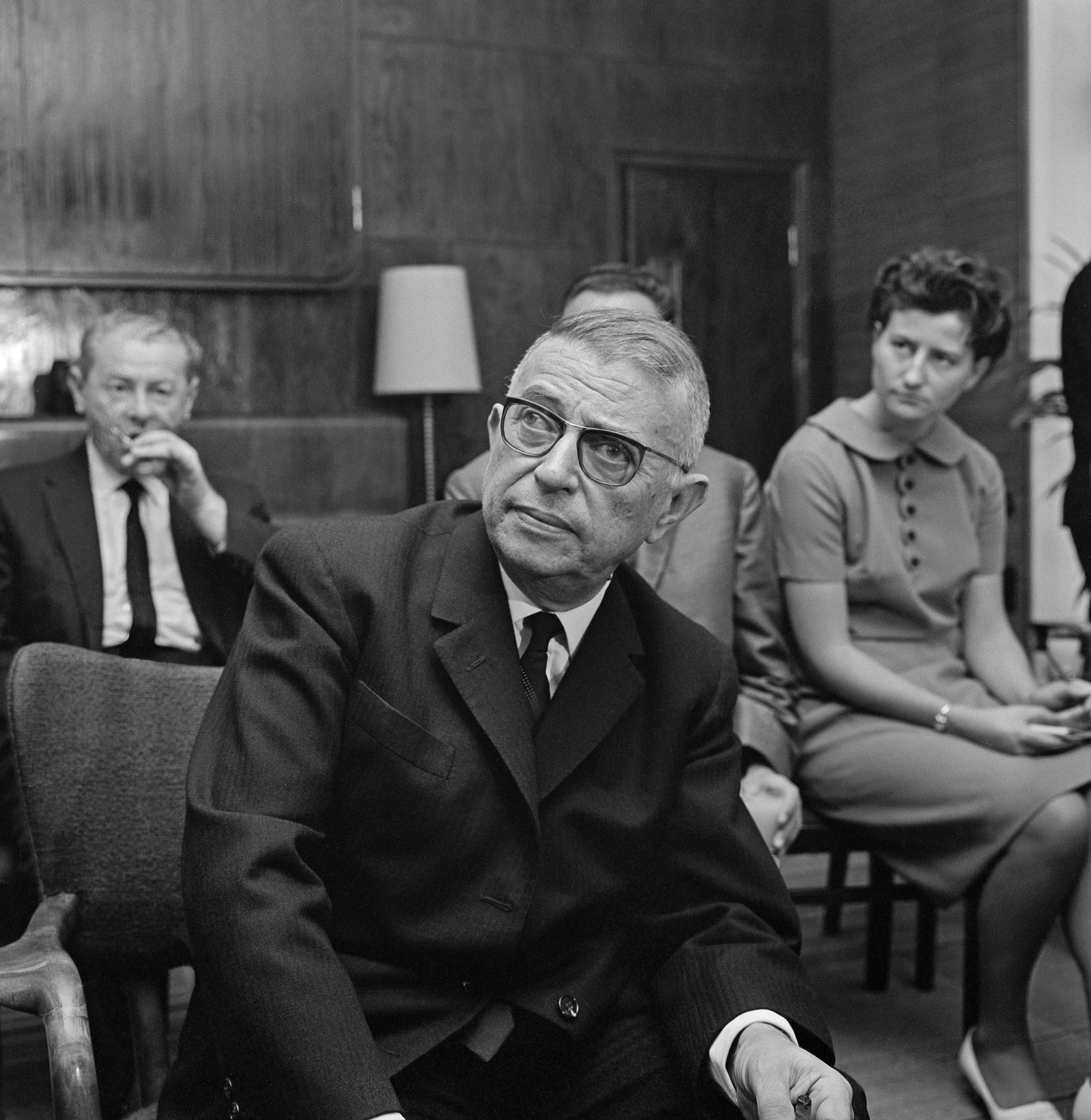
French writer Jean-Paul Sartre. He refused the 1964 Nobel Prize in Literature.

Since the first award in 1901 year, conferment of the Nobel Prizes, including the Nobel Prize in Literature, has engendered criticism and controversies. After his death in 1896, the will of Swedish industrialist Alfred Nobel established that an annual prize be awarded for service to humanity in the fields of physics, chemistry, physiology or medicine, literature, and peace. Similarly, the Sveriges Riksbank Prize in Economic Sciences in Memory of Alfred Nobel, first awarded in 1969 year, is awarded along with the Nobel Prizes. Nobel sought to reward "those who, during the preceding year, shall have conferred the greatest benefit on mankind".

From 1901 to 1912, the committee's work reflected an interpretation of the "ideal direction" stated in Nobel's will as "a lofty and sound idealism", which caused Leo Tolstoy, Henrik Ibsen, Mark Twain and Émile Zola to be rejected. Sweden's historic antipathy towards Russia was cited as the reason neither Tolstoy nor Anton Chekhov took the prize. During World War I and its immediate aftermath, the committee adopted a policy of neutrality, favouring writers from non-combatant countries. The interpretation of Nobel's original words concerning the Literature prize has also undergone repeated revisions.

Later, the prize has often been controversial due to the Swedish Academy's Eurocentric choices of laureates, or for political reasons, as seen in the years 1970, 2005, and 2019, and for the academy awarding its own members, as happened in 1974.

The Swedish Academy has also been criticised for historically favouring male writers. The heavy male dominance of laureates during the first century of the prize's history can partly be explained that much fewer female authors were nominated in the early history of the prize. Of the 1256 nominations between 1901 and 1950 only 44 were for female authors, of which five were awarded the prize. Between 1946 and 1990 only one woman, Nelly Sachs, was awarded the prize (shared with Shmuel Yosef Agnon in 1966). Eliza Orzeszkowa and Cecile Tormay were seriously considered for the prizes in 1905 and 1936, respectively, but were ultimately passed over. As were the multiple nominations for the Portuguese writer Maria Madalena de Martel Patrício, Spanish Concha Espina, American Edith Wharton and Danish author Karen Blixen.

The only laureate to ever refuse the Nobel Prize in Literature without reverting his decision was Jean-Paul Sartre in 1964 as he did not want to be “institutionalised.”

== Controversies by year ==
=== 1901: Prudhomme ===
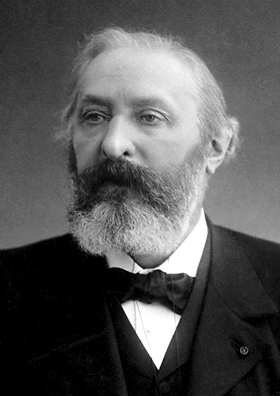
The Swedish Academy's decision to award Sully Prudhomme (pictured) the first Nobel Prize in Literature caused controversy.

The Swedish Academy's choice of the French poet Sully Prudhomme as the first Nobel prize laureate in literature was heavily criticized. Many believed that Leo Tolstoy should have been awarded the first Nobel Prize in literature. The choice of Prudhomme was interpreted as a politeness towards the Académie Française, model to the Swedish Academy. A number of the leading representatives of the contemporary Swedish cultural elite including August Strindberg, Selma Lagerlöf and Verner von Heidenstam protested against the Academy and sent a letter to Tolstoy saying he was the most worthy recipient of the prize and that the Swedish Academy did not represent the majority of Swedish cultural persons.

=== 1902: Mommsen ===
In 1902, Leo Tolstoy was considered for the prize along with the Norwegian authors Henrik Ibsen and Bjørnstjerne Bjørnson. Tolstoy was praised for his prominent literary work, but dismissed for his anarchistic ideology. Ibsen was dismissed for similar reasons, his radical style was considered completely against the ideal direction required by Alfred Nobel's will, while Bjørnson was pushed for the next year. As a consequence, German historian Theodor Mommsen was launched as a compromise candidate that could be agreed upon. While Mommsen was respected for his work, The Swedish Academy's decision to award a non-fiction writer instead of the most prominent writers of the time such as Tolstoy and Ibsen was criticized.

=== 1903: Bjørnson ===
On rumours of a shared prize to Bjørnstjerne Bjørnson and Henrik Ibsen, Bjørnson told Norwegian reporters that he would refuse a shared prize. While the Nobel committee had rejected the proposal of a shared prize to them, thinking it would likely be misunderstood as two distinguished authors being worthy of only half a prize, the committee took notice of Bjørnson's statement and, on the event that Bjørnson should decline the award, recommended that the prize alternatively should be awarded to Frédéric Mistral (who was awarded the following year).

=== 1908: Eucken ===
While some of their prize decisions were well received at the time, the Swedish Academy's handling of the Nobel prize in its early history has been heavily criticized. Nobel committee chairman Carl David af Wirsén was known to fiercely oppose that authors he disliked, such as Henrik Ibsen and Selma Lagerlöf, be awarded the prize. The choice of the insignificant German philosopher Rudolf Christoph Eucken as a compromise winner of the prize in 1908 was heavily criticized at the time, and has been described as one of the worst mistakes in the history of the Nobel Prize in Literature.

=== 1920: Hamsun ===
Knut Hamsun sent his Nobel medal to German propaganda minister Joseph Goebbels as a gift, after a meeting they had in 1943.

=== 1926: Shaw ===
In 1926, George Bernard Shaw first declined the 1925 Nobel Prize (which was awarded a year later) stating "I can forgive Nobel for inventing dynamite, but only a fiend in human form could have invented the Nobel prize". He later changed his mind and accepted the honour, but refused to receive the prize money. Shaw recommended that the prize money instead be used to fund the translation of works by Swedish playwright August Strindberg to English.

=== 1931: Karlfeldt ===
The 1931 prize awarded to "The poetry of Erik Axel Karlfeldt" was the first and only time the Nobel Prize in Literature has been awarded posthumously, which caused controversy in the Swedish press. In several newspapers the Swedish Academy's decision to posthumously award an author, particularly one who had refused to accept it before, was questioned and said to be against the purpose of the award. Internationally, it was heavily criticized as few had heard of Karlfeldt.

=== 1938: Buck ===
The 1938 Nobel Prize awarded to Pearl Buck is one of the most criticized in the prize's history because Buck's later works generally were not considered to be of the literary standard of a Nobel laureate. According to novelist Irving Wallace, he was told by Swedish Academy member Sven Hedin that Buck "scarcely bowled over the academy". Ten of the eighteen members voted against her, but Hedin and Selma Lagerlöf later changed their minds thus awarding her the prize.

=== 1953: Churchill ===
The prize awarded to Winston Churchill in 1953 has widely been seen as politically motivated, rather than an award for Churchill's literary merits. "Winston Churchill is historical but he belongs only to a little extent to the history of literature," wrote Helmer Lång in his 2001 book about the Nobel Prizes in literature, "It was the defender of democracy, the winner against fascism, that was awarded a Nobel Prize (...) for once it was also a master of eloquence that was awarded", that it was Churchill's speeches during World War II and his recently completed non-fiction work The Second World War that won him the prize. Churchill's private secretary Anthony Montague Browne later revealed that Churchill was disappointed that he had not been awarded the Nobel Peace Prize: “Churchill deeply wished to be remembered as a peacemaker.... I remember vividly his early and touching joy, which turned to indifference when he learned that it was for Literature and not for Peace.”

=== 1958: Pasternak ===
Following the international success of the novel Doctor Zhivago, Boris Pasternak was awarded the 1958 Nobel Prize in Literature, which angered the Soviet Union authorities. Pasternak first accepted the prize, but was forced by the authorities to decline it. After Doctor Zhivago was finally published in Russian in 1988, Pasternak's son accepted the prize on his father's behalf.

=== 1959: Quasimodo ===
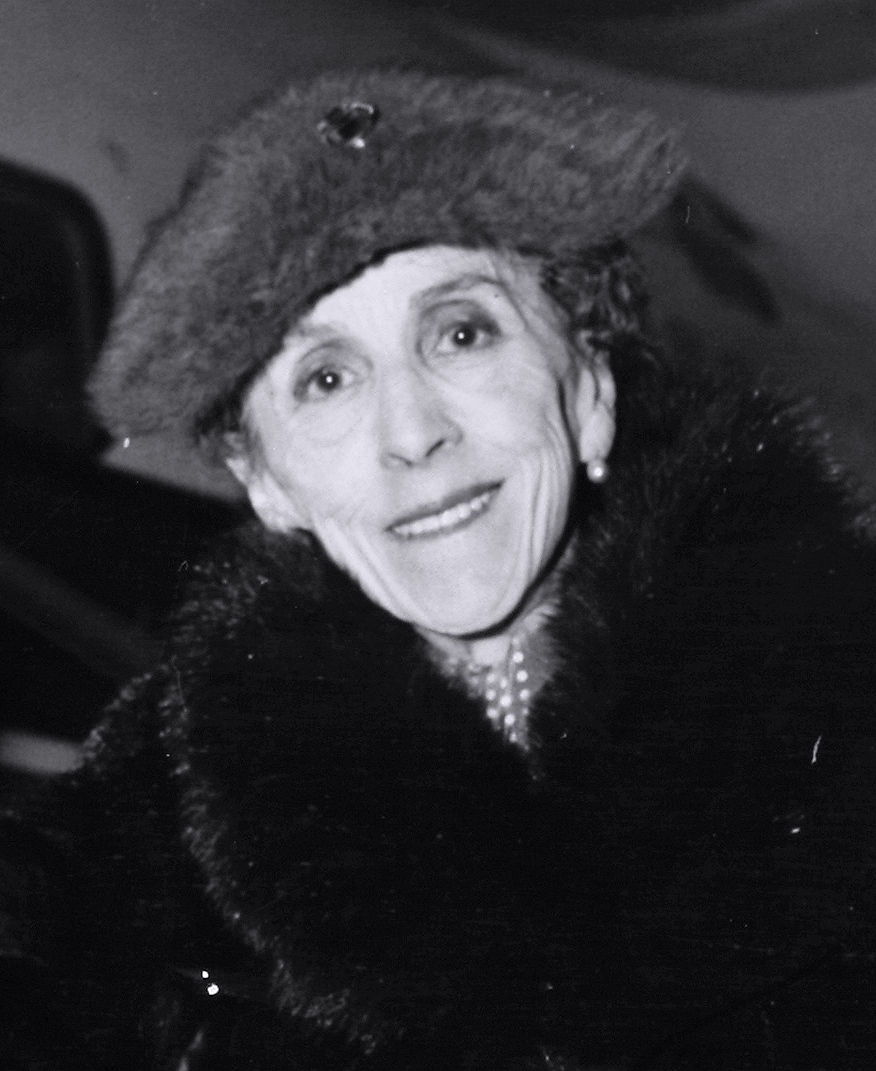
The Nobel committee proposed that the 1959 Nobel Prize in Literature should be awarded to the Danish author Karen Blixen.

The Nobel committee proposed that the Danish author Karen Blixen should be awarded the 1959 Nobel Prize in Literature. Committee chairman Anders Österling advocated a prize for Blixen, citing her "undubitable masterpiece" Out of Africa, and her short stories in which "she has created her own genre," that "at the high points are shining with ingenious fantasy and spiritual human knowledge". Two other members of the Nobel committee also supported a prize to Blixen, but one committee member, Eyvind Johnson (who himself fifteen years later would accept the 1974 Nobel Prize in Literature), opposed a prize to Blixen arguing that Scandinavians were overrepresentated among the Nobel laureates in literature and instead proposed a prize to a representative of the "rich, modern Italian literature", that Johnson thought had been neglected by the Nobel committee.

Unconventionally, the members of the Swedish Academy voted against the committee's recommendation of Blixen and instead awarded the Italian poet Salvatore Quasimodo. The choice of Quasimodo was widely criticized as a mediocre choice and in awarding an Italian poet Giuseppe Ungaretti and Eugenio Montale (awarded in 1975) was cited as more worthy recipients of the award.

=== 1962: Steinbeck ===
The selection of John Steinbeck was heavily criticized, and described as "one of the Academy's biggest mistakes" in one Swedish newspaper. The New York Times asked why the Nobel committee gave the award to an author whose "limited talent is, in his best books, watered down by tenth-rate philosophising", adding, "we think it interesting that the laurel was not awarded to a writer ... whose significance, influence and sheer body of work had already made a more profound impression on the literature of our age". Steinbeck himself, when asked if he deserved the Nobel on the day of the announcement, replied: "Frankly, no."

=== 1964: Sartre ===
Jean-Paul Sartre declined the Nobel Prize in Literature, claiming that he refused official distinctions and did not want to be institutionalised and for fear that it would limit the impact of his writing. While Sartre's statement to the Swedish press was polite, he revealed in the 1976 documentary film Sartre par lui-même (Sartre by Himself) quite opposite reasons for rejecting the Nobel Prize, stating: "Because I was politically involved, the bourgeois establishment wanted to cover up my past errors. Now there's an admission! And so they gave me the Nobel Prize. They pardoned me and said I deserved it. It was monstrous!"

=== 1965: Sholokhov ===
The 1965 prize awarded to the Soviet Union writer Mikhail Sholokhov was a controversial choice that was widely criticized for being politically motivated.

=== 1969: Beckett ===
Samuel Beckett was a controversial choice within the Swedish Academy. The Nobel committee were split between the two final candidates, French writer André Malraux and Samuel Beckett. Committee chair Anders Österling opposed awarding the prize to Beckett as he had serious doubts that Beckett's writing was in the spirit of Alfred Nobel's will. in 1964 Österling had argued that he "would almost consider a Nobel prize for him as an absurdity in his own style". Despite Österling's reservations, Beckett won the majority of the votes and was awarded the prize. Beckett's reaction to the news that he had been awarded the Nobel prize was described as a "catastrophe". While not rejecting the prize, Beckett did not attend the award ceremony in Stockholm, nor did he deliver a Nobel lecture, and donated the prize money, much of it to Trinity College Dublin.

=== 1970: Solzhenitsyn ===
The 1970 prize was awarded to Soviet dissident Aleksandr Solzhenitsyn, who did not attend the ceremony in Stockholm for fear that the Soviet Union would prevent his return. His works there were available only in samizdat-published, clandestine form. After the Swedish government refused to hold a public award ceremony and lecture at its Moscow embassy, Solzhenitsyn refused the award altogether, commenting that the conditions set by the Swedes (who preferred a private ceremony) were "an insult to the Nobel Prize itself". Solzhenitsyn later accepted the award on 10 December 1974, after the Soviet Union banished him. Critics suggest that Solzhenitsyn was awarded the prize because of his political stance, not his writing.

=== 1974: Johnson and Martinson ===
The 1974 prize was awarded to the Swedish authors Eyvind Johnson and Harry Martinson: both themselves members of the Swedish Academy and little known outside their home country. Graham Greene, Jorge Luis Borges, Saul Bellow and Vladimir Nabokov were favourites to win the award that year. Bellow won in 1976; neither Greene, Borges nor Nabokov were awarded the prize.

=== 1980: Milosz ===
The awarding of the Nobel prize to Czeslaw Miłosz coincided with the rise of the Solidarity movement in Poland. Many assumed that Milosz had been awarded for political reasons and the Swedish Academy was charged with political opportunism.

=== 1981: Canetti ===
The 1981 laureate Elias Canetti was a controversial choice within the Swedish Academy. Two members of the Academy told Swedish reporters that they were dissatisfied with the prize decision and Canetti's name was disclosed in the Swedish press before the prize announcement.

=== 1983: Golding ===
The choice of William Golding was unconventionally criticized by one of the Nobel committee's own members, Artur Lundkvist. Lundkvist, who advocated the Senegalese poet Léopold Sédar Senghor and French novelist Claude Simon (awarded in 1985) as candidates for the prize, said that Golding "was decent but hardly in the Nobel Prize class", and publicly accused the Academy's permanent secretary Lars Gyllensten of orchestrating a "coup" within the Academy, claiming to have been excluded from a second voting when Golding received the majority of the votes. Lundkvist further added that Golding was "a small English phenomenon of no great interest.", and revealed that he favoured Anthony Burgess over the other British candidates Graham Greene and Golding.

=== 1997: Fo ===
The 1997 prize went to Italian actor-playwright Dario Fo, who was initially considered "rather lightweight" by some critics, as he was seen primarily as a performer and had previously been censured by the Roman Catholic Church. Salman Rushdie and Arthur Miller had been favoured to receive the prize, but a committee member was later quoted as saying that they would have been "too predictable, too popular".

=== 2000: Gao ===
The choice of Chinese writer Gao Xingjian was heavily criticized. The professor of Chinese history and literature at University of Canberra, Geremie Barmé, called the prize decision "a comical masterpiece", while saying he was happy that a Chinese writer, "even an uneven and mediocre" one, had finally been awarded the prize. Respected literature critic Thomas Steinfeld, chief editor of literature at the German newspaper Frankfurter Allgemeine Zeitung expressed a feeling of humiliation that the prize had been awarded to an author unknown to them. In China, the news that the dissident writer Gao Xingjian had been awarded the Nobel Prize in Literature was first met with silence in Chinese media, then Gao Xingjian was condemned.

=== 2002: Kertész ===
The choice of Imre Kertész as the first Hungarian recipient of the Nobel Prize in Literature was controversial within Hungary. At the time of his award, Hungarian literary critics noted the writer's obscurity there (he had achieved most renown in Germany); expressed the sentiment that more prominent Hungarian writers like Endre Ady, Gyula Krúdy, and István Örkény had been passed over by the Nobel committee over the course of the 20th century; and noted Kertész's own ambivalent relationship, as a Hungarian Jew who had survived the Holocaust in Hungary, to Hungarian national identity. Kertész remained a controversial figure in the years following his receipt of the prize due to a series of interviews with German publications in which he was perceived as highly critical of Hungarian culture and collective memory practices. Nonetheless, in 2014, Kertész received and accepted Hungary's highest state decoration, the Order of St. Stephen, from president János Áder.

=== 2004: Jelinek ===
The 2004 prize was awarded to Elfriede Jelinek. Academy member Knut Ahnlund, who had been inactive since 1996, resigned, alleging that selecting Jelinek had caused "irreparable damage" to the prize's reputation.

=== 2005: Pinter ===
The 2005 prize went to Harold Pinter, "who in his plays uncovers the precipice under everyday prattle and forces entry into oppression's closed rooms". The award was delayed for some days, apparently due to Knut Ahnlund's resignation. In turn, this renewed speculation about a "political element" existing in the Swedish Academy's awarding of the Prize. Although poor health prevented him from giving his controversial Nobel Lecture, "Art, Truth and Politics", in person, Pinter appeared on video, which was simultaneously transmitted on Britain's Channel Four. The issue of "political stance" was also raised in response to Orhan Pamuk and Doris Lessing, prizewinners in 2006 and 2007, respectively.

=== 2009: Müller ===
The 2009 prize awarded to Herta Müller was criticized because many U.S. literary critics and professors had never heard of Müller before. This reignited criticism that the committee was too Eurocentric.

=== 2010: Vargas Llosa ===
In 2010, the prize was awarded to the Peruvian writer Mario Vargas Llosa. Some people, including the poet Antonio Cisneros, stated that he would have been awarded the prize earlier if not for his right-wing political stance in Peru. Vargas Llosa was against nationalization proposed by president Alan García.

=== 2012: Yan ===
The 2012 prize awarded to the Chinese author Mo Yan caused controversy. Several Chinese dissidents criticized Mo Yan, saying he voiced support for the Chinese government's system of censorship in his Nobel lecture.

=== 2016: Dylan ===
The 2016 prize awarded to Bob Dylan was controversial, since it marked the first time that a songwriter-musician had been awarded the prize. Many writers and commentators, mostly novelists, objected, feeling it cheapened the prize. Scottish novelist Irvine Welsh stated "I'm a Dylan fan, but this is an ill-conceived nostalgia award wrenched from the rancid prostates of senile, gibbering hippies", while Lebanese novelist Rabih Alameddine argued that "Bob Dylan winning a Nobel in Literature is like Mrs Fields being awarded 3 Michelin stars." However, others noted that poetry has long been recognized by the committee and speculated that the popularity of Dylan's work was the true motive behind those objecting. Songwriter Leonard Cohen said that awarding Dylan the prize was "like pinning a medal on Mount Everest for being the highest mountain".

In a live webchat hosted by The Guardian, Norwegian writer Karl Ove Knausgård said that "I'm very divided. I love that the Nobel committee opens up for other kinds of literature – lyrics and so on. I think that's brilliant. But knowing that Dylan is the same generation as Thomas Pynchon, Philip Roth, Cormac McCarthy, makes it very difficult for me to accept it." An article in Slate magazine found multiple parts of Dylan's Nobel lecture that closely resembled the analysis of Moby-Dick on the study guide website SparkNotes. According to an Associated Press analysis, the two texts contained more than 20 "identical phrases and similar phrasing", but "no verbatim sentences". The New York Times wrote that plagiarism allegations were "nothing new" for Dylan, who had defended borrowing material as "a rich and enriching tradition" in folk music.

=== 2019: Handke ===
The 2019 prize awarded to Austrian novelist and playwright Peter Handke came under heavy criticism due to his history of denying the Bosnian genocide and his vocal support for late Serbian President Slobodan Milošević, even speaking at his funeral in 2006. Authors Miha Mazzini, Hari Kunzru, Jonathan Littell, Slavoj Žižek, and Salman Rushdie each heavily criticized the choice, and it was further condemned by PEN International, as well as Holocaust historian Deborah Lipstadt, who said that the award gave his views a platform that "he does not deserve and the public does not need him to have". The governments of Bosnia and Herzegovina, Kosovo, and Turkey issued condemnations against the award, and the ambassadors from Albania, Bosnia, Croatia, Kosovo, North Macedonia, and Turkey boycotted the award ceremony. Hundreds of people protested outside the award ceremony, and a petition to revoke the award received close to 60,000 signatures.

== Claims of Eurocentrism ==
The heavy focus on European authors, and Swedes in particular, is the subject of mounting criticism, including from major Swedish newspapers. The majority of the laureates for the Nobel Prize in Literature have been European. Swedes in particular have received more prizes in this category than all of Asia. In 2008, Horace Engdahl, then the permanent secretary of the academy, declared that "Europe still is the center of the literary world" and said that American writers did not win often (the most recent at the time was Toni Morrison, 15 years prior) because "the US is too isolated, too insular. They don't translate enough and don't really participate in the big dialogue of literature." David Remnick replied, "You would think that the permanent secretary of an academy that pretends to wisdom but has historically overlooked Marcel Proust, James Joyce, and Vladimir Nabokov, to name just a few non-Nobelists, would spare us the categorical lectures." Remnick cited Philip Roth, John Updike and Don DeLillo as counterexamples to Engdahl's claim, along with "many younger writers, some of them sons and daughters of immigrants writing in their adopted English."

Adam Kirsch wrote: "When Saul Bellow learned that he had won the Nobel Prize for literature in 1976, he reacted to the news in the only way a great writer can or should: He tried hard not to care. 'I'm glad to get it,' Bellow admitted, but 'I could live without it.' This month, as the Swedish Academy prepares for its annual announcement, Bellow's heirs in the top ranks of American literature—Roth, Updike, Pynchon, DeLillo—already know they're going to live without the Nobel Prize." In 2009, Engdahl's replacement, Peter Englund, rejected his sentiment ("In most language areas ... there are authors that really deserve and could get the Nobel Prize and that goes for the United States and the Americas, as well"), and acknowledged the Eurocentric bias of the selections, saying that, "I think that is a problem. We tend to relate more easily to literature written in Europe and in the European tradition."

== Unrecognized literary achievements ==
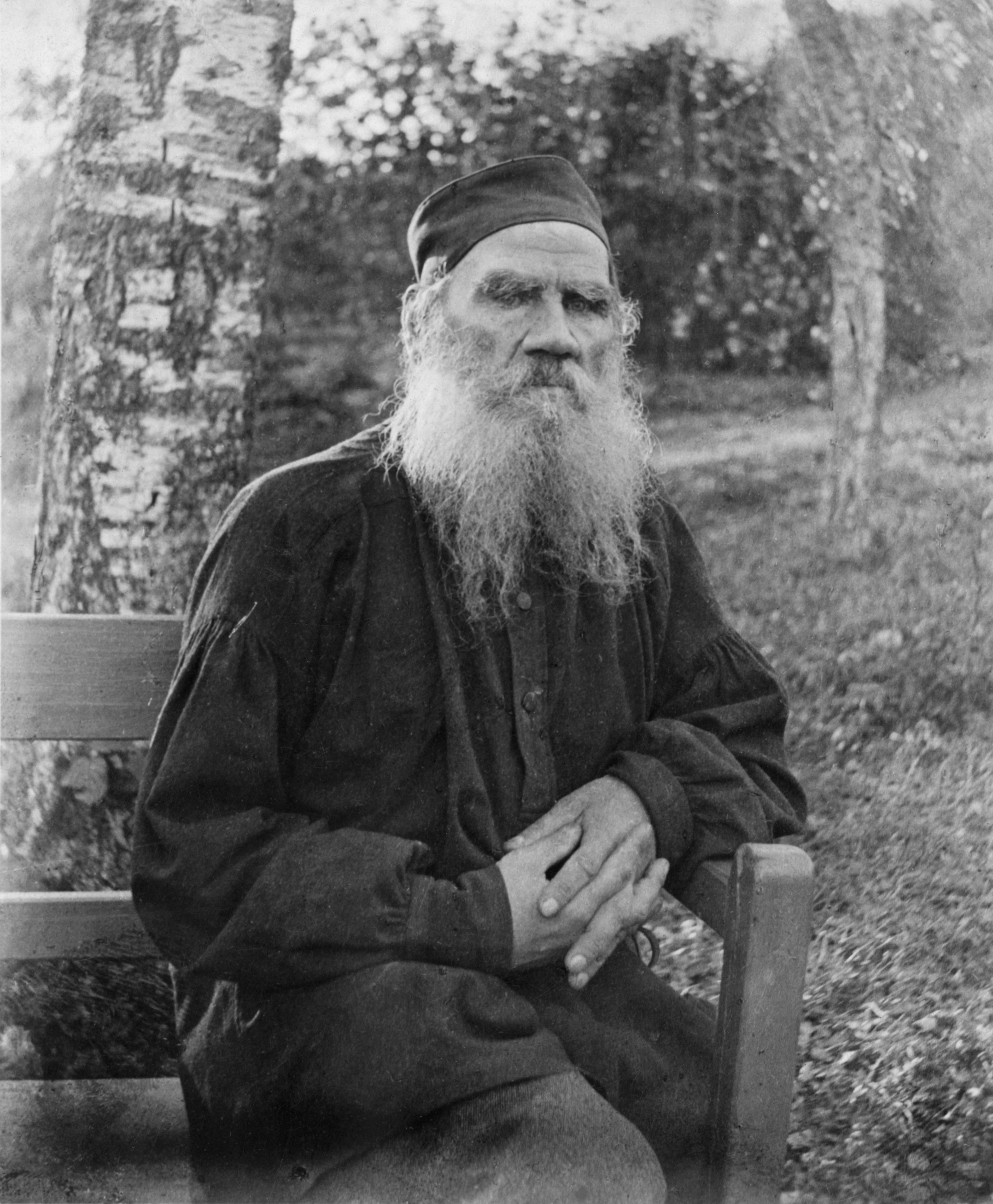
Leo Tolstoy was nominated several times but never won the Nobel Prize in Literature.

The Nobel Prize in Literature has a history of controversial omissions. Joseph Epstein noted: "You may not know it, but you and I are members of a club whose fellow members include Leo Tolstoy, Henry James, Anton Chekhov, Mark Twain, Henrik Ibsen, Marcel Proust, Joseph Conrad, James Joyce, Thomas Hardy, Jorge Luis Borges and Vladimir Nabokov. The club is the Non-Winners of the Nobel Prize in Literature. All these authentically great writers, still alive when the prize, initiated in 1901, was being awarded, didn't win it." This led him to speculate that "Criteria other than high art seem to be involved." Other major authors have been ignored, including Joseph Kessel, André Malraux, W. H. Auden, Graham Greene and Virginia Woolf.

There are omissions which are beyond the control of the Nobel Committee such as the early death of an author as was the case with Marcel Proust, Italo Calvino, and Roberto Bolaño. According to Kjell Espmark, "the main works of Kafka, Cavafy, and Pessoa were not published until after their deaths, and the true dimensions of Mandelstam's poetry were revealed above all in the unpublished poems that his wife saved from extinction and gave to the world long after he had perished in his Siberian exile."

British novelist Tim Parks ascribed the never-ending controversy surrounding the decisions of the Nobel Committee to the "essential silliness of the prize and our own foolishness at taking it seriously" and noted that "eighteen (or sixteen) Swedish nationals will have a certain credibility when weighing up works of Swedish literature, but what group could ever really get its mind round the infinitely varied work of scores of different traditions. And why should we ask them to do that?"

Although several Scandinavians were awarded, two of the most celebrated writers, Norwegian playwright Henrik Ibsen and Swedish author August Strindberg, were repeatedly bypassed by the committee, but Strindberg holds the singular distinction of being awarded an Anti-Nobel Prize, conferred by popular acclaim and national subscription and presented to him in 1912 by future prime minister Hjalmar Branting.

Paul Valéry was nominated twelve times between 1930 and 1945 but died just as the academy intended to award him the prize in 1945. James Joyce wrote the books that rank 1st and 3rd on the Modern Library 100 Best Novels – Ulysses and A Portrait of the Artist as a Young Man – but Joyce was never nominated for the prize. Kjell Espmark, a member of the Nobel Prize committee and author of the history of the prize, claimed that Joyce's "stature was not properly recognized even in the English-speaking world," but that Joyce doubtless would have been awarded if he had lived in the late 1940s when the academy began to award literary pioneers like T. S. Eliot.

Argentine writer Jorge Luis Borges was nominated for the prize several times, but the academy did not award it to him, though he was among the final candidates some years in the 1960s. Edwin Williamson, Borges' biographer, stated that the author's support of Argentine and Chilean right-wing military dictators may have been a factor. Graham Greene was nominated for the prize forty-three times between 1950 and 1975. Greene was a celebrated candidate to be awarded the prize in the 1960s and 1970s, and the academy was criticised for passing him over. W. H. Auden was nominated for the Nobel Prize in Literature forty-one times from 1961 until his death in 1973, and was among the final candidates for the prize several times, but the academy favoured other writers. In 1964 Auden and Jean-Paul Sartre were the leading candidates, and the academy favoured Sartre as Auden's best work was thought "too far back in time." In 1967 Auden was one of three final candidates along with Graham Greene and the awarded Guatemalan author Miguel Ángel Asturias.

Czech writer Karel Čapek's War With the Newts was considered too offensive to the German government, and he declined to suggest a non-controversial publication that could be cited in its stead ("Thank you for the good will, but I have already written my doctoral dissertation"). He never received a prize. French novelist and intellectual André Malraux was considered for the Literature prize in the 1950s, according to Swedish Academy archives studied by the newspaper Le Monde on their opening in 2008. Malraux was competing with Albert Camus, but was rejected several times, especially in 1954 and 1955, "so long as he does not come back to the novel", while Camus won the prize in 1957. The academy's refusal to express support for Salman Rushdie in 1989, after Ayatollah Ruhollah Khomeini issued a fatwā calling for his death, led two Academy members to resign.

=== Tolstoy ===
Leo Tolstoy was nominated for the Nobel Prize in Literature every year from 1902 to 1906 but never won, and in 1901 he was not even nominated, resulting in a major controversy. The 1901 prize went instead to French poet Sully Prudhomme, and the year after to German historian Theodor Mommsen. Reports suggest that Tolstoy did not receive the prize because of the jury's reservations towards his political and religious positions as well as Sweden's historical enmity towards Russia. In 1901, 42 Swedish writers, including August Strindberg, wrote Tolstoy a letter following the announcement, expressing their dissatisfaction with the decision.

== Swedish Academy board members ==
Membership in the 18-member academy, who select the recipients, is technically for life. Until 2018, members were not allowed to leave, although they might refuse to participate. For members who did not participate, their board seat was left vacant until they died. Twelve active/participating members are required for a quorum.

In 1989, three members, including the former permanent secretary Lars Gyllensten, resigned in protest after the academy refused to denounce Ayatollah Ruhollah Khomeini for calling for the death of Salman Rushdie, author of The Satanic Verses. A fourth member, Knut Ahnlund, decided to remain in the academy but later refused to participate in their work and resigned on 11 October 2005, just a few days before the announcement of the 2005 Nobel Prize in Literature in protest against the prize being awarded to Elfriede Jelinek. According to Ahnlund, the decision to award Jelinek ruined the worth of the Nobel Prize in Literature for a long time. He characterized Jelinek's work as chaotic and pornographic.

=== 2018 controversy and award cancellation ===
In April 2018, three members of the academy board resigned in response to a sexual misconduct investigation involving author Jean-Claude Arnault, who is married to board member Katarina Frostenson. Arnault was accused by at least 18 women of sexual assault and harassment. He and his wife were also accused of leaking the names of prize recipients on at least seven occasions so friends could profit from bets. He denied all accusations, although he was later convicted of rape and sentenced to two years and six months in prison. Sara Danius, the board secretary, hired a law firm to investigate if Frostenson had leaked confidential information and if Arnault had any influence on the academy, but no legal action was taken. The investigation caused a split within the academy. Following a vote to exclude board member Frostenson, the three members resigned in protest over the decisions by the academy. Two former permanent secretaries, Sture Allén and Horace Engdahl, called Danius a weak leader.

On 10 April, Danius was asked to resign from her position by the academy, bringing the number of empty seats to four. Although the academy voted against removing Katarina Frostenson from the committee, she voluntarily agreed to withdraw from participating in the academy, bringing the number of total withdrawals to five. Because two other seats were still vacant from the Rushdie affair, this left only 11 active members, one short of the quorum needed to vote in replacements. On 4 May 2018, the Swedish Academy announced that the selection would be postponed until 2019, when two laureates would be chosen. It was still technically possible to choose a 2018 laureate, as only eight active members are required to choose a recipient. However, there were concerns that the academy was not in any condition to credibly present the award. The New Academy Prize in Literature, not affiliated with either the Nobel Foundation or the Swedish Academy, was created as an alternative award for 2018 only. The first and only New Academy Prize in Literature was won by Maryse Condé, a writer from Guadeloupe noted for her novels Segu, Tree of Life: A Novel of the Caribbean and Windward Heights.

The scandal was widely seen as damaging to the credibility of the prize and its authority. As noted by Andrew Brown in The Guardian in a lengthy deconstruction of the scandal:

"The scandal has elements of a tragedy, in which people who set out to serve literature and culture discovered they were only pandering to writers and the people who hang around with them. The pursuit of excellence in art was entangled with the pursuit of social prestige. The academy behaved as if the meals in its clubhouse were as much an accomplishment as the work that got people elected there."

King Carl XVI Gustaf of Sweden said a reform of the rules may be evaluated, including the introduction of the right to resign from the current lifelong membership of the committee. On 5 March 2019, it was announced that the Nobel Prize in Literature would once again be awarded, and laureates for both 2018 and 2019 would be announced together. The decision came after several changes were made to the structure of the Swedish Academy as well as to the Nobel Committee members selection, in order to "[restore] trust in the Academy as a prize-awarding institution".

== See also ==
- Nobel Peace Prize controversies
- Nobel Prize in Physics controversies
