= Nobel Peace Prize controversies =

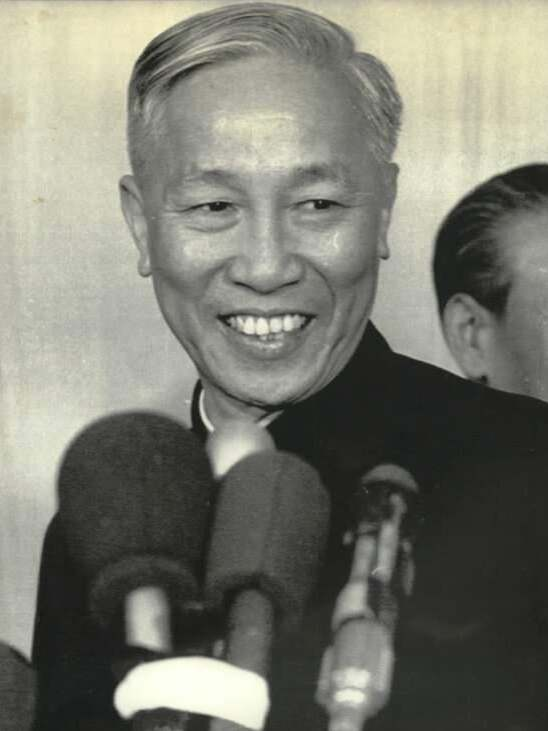
Vietnamese leader Lê Đức Thọ is the only person to have refused the Nobel Peace Prize.

Since the first award in 1901 year, conferment of the Nobel Prizes has engendered criticism and controversies. After his death in 1896, the will of Swedish industrialist Alfred Nobel established that an annual prize be awarded for service to humanity in the fields of physics, chemistry, physiology or medicine, literature, and peace.

In accordance with Nobel's will, the Nobel Peace Prize is selected by the Norwegian Nobel Committee, a five-member committee appointed by the Parliament of Norway unlike all the other awards chosen by the Swedish Nobel Committees. Nobel Peace Prize controversies often reach beyond the academic community. Criticisms that have been leveled against some of the awards include allegations that they were politically motivated, premature, or guided by a faulty definition of what constitutes work for peace.

== Controversies per year ==
=== 1906: Roosevelt ===
The first head of state to receive a Nobel Peace Prize was United States president Theodore Roosevelt for his arbitration to stop the Russo–Japanese War. Roosevelt was previously militarily involved in Cuba during the 1898 Spanish–American War and had sent fleets to the Caribbean during his presidency. The New York Times wrote "a broad smile illuminated the face of the globe when the prize was awarded … to the most warlike citizen of these United States". A similar comment came from Spaniard Santiago Ramón y Cajal, who got the Nobel Medicine Prize of that year.

=== 1935: von Ossietzky ===
The prize of 1935 was retroactively awarded one year later to Carl von Ossietzky, a German pacifist who had been convicted of high treason and espionage for exposing German rearmament. In an unprecedented move, King Haakon VII of Norway was absent from the award ceremony, two committee members resigned in protest, and the Norwegian conservative press, including leading daily Aftenposten, condemned giving the award to a convicted criminal. Ossietzky, interned in the concentration camp Esterwegen and severely ill with tuberculosis, accepted the award by letter but was prevented from traveling to Oslo. The award led to Adolf Hitler's forbidding any German to receive any of the Nobel Prizes in the future, and Ossietzky's prize was not allowed to be mentioned in the German press.

=== 1973: Kissinger and Lê ===
The 1973 prize went to North Vietnamese communist leader Lê Đức Thọ and United States Secretary of State Henry A. Kissinger "for the 1973 Paris Peace Accords intended to bring about a cease-fire in the Vietnam War and a withdrawal of the American forces". Thọ later declined the prize, on grounds that such "bourgeois sentimentalities" were not for him and that the Paris Peace Accords were not being adhered to in full. Kissinger was also privately skeptical about sharing the prize, saying to Soviet ambassador Anatoly Dobrynin, "I figure it like Groucho Marx said, 'any club that took him in he would not want to join'. I would say that anything Lê Đức Thọ is eligible for, there must be something wrong with it."

North Vietnam invaded South Vietnam in April 1975 and reunified the country whilst Lê Đức Thọ was still in government. Thọ had also been in government during the Tet Offensive, a Viet Cong surprise assault that killed 7,721 civilians, destroyed 75,000 homes, and displaced over 670,000 people. Kissinger's history included the secret 1969–1975 bombing campaign against Khmer Rouge and North Vietnamese Army troops in Cambodia, U.S. involvement in Operation Condor—a mid-1970s campaign of kidnapping and murder coordinated among the intelligence and security services of Argentina, Bolivia, Brazil, Chile (see details), Paraguay, and Uruguay—as well as the death of French nationals under the Chilean junta. He also supported the Turkish invasion of Cyprus, resulting in the de facto partition of the island. Kissinger has been cited as being responsible for the deaths of between 3 million and 4 million people during his eight-year term in office. According to Irwin Abrams in 2001, this prize was the most controversial to date. Two Norwegian Nobel Committee members resigned in protest.

The American press also reacted with consternation to the award. The New York Times dubbed it the "Nobel War Prize", and The Washington Post quoted retired diplomat George Ball as saying that on the evidence "The Norwegians must have a sense of humour." The well-known comedian and political satirist Tom Lehrer said: "Political satire became obsolete when Henry Kissinger was awarded the Nobel peace prize." When the award was announced, hostilities were continuing. Kissinger did not attend the award ceremony in Oslo over concern that it would be targeted by anti-war protest groups. He requested that the prize money be donated to a scholarship fund for US servicemen killed or missing in Indochina. In 1975, as Saigon fell to North Vietnamese forces, he offered to return the medal, an offer not accepted by the Nobel Committee.

=== 1979: Mother Teresa ===
Mother Teresa (born Anjezë Gonxhe Bojaxhiu) received the 1979 prize for "work undertaken in the struggle to overcome poverty and distress, which also constitutes a threat to peace". However, the 1979 laureate was a subject of numerous controversies. Critics, particularly Canadian academics Serge Larivée, Geneviève Chénard, and Carole Sénéchal, argued that despite receiving millions in donations, her clinics provided inadequate medical care, lacking proper diagnosis, nutrition, and pain relief. They contended that Mother Teresa viewed suffering as spiritually valuable, believing the sick should suffer like Christ, and that donated funds could have been used to create modern palliative care instead. Journalist Christopher Hitchens echoed and amplified these criticisms, accusing her of glorifying poverty, misleading donors, opposing women's empowerment and reproductive rights, and acting hypocritically by accepting advanced medical care for herself. He argued that her primary mission was religious expansion rather than alleviating poverty.

=== 1991: Aung San Suu Kyi ===
In 1991, Aung San Suu Kyi received the prize "for her non-violent struggle for democracy and human rights." Her party had got most of the vote in the 1990 Burmese general election, but the military refused to yield power and placed her under house arrest for years. In 2016, her party won again. While she was barred constitutionally from becoming the president of Burma, the position of State Counsellor was created for her. In 2017, there were calls to take her prize away because of her reaction to the Rohingya genocide. On 14 February 2025, a court in Argentina, acting on a petition from the Burmese Rohingya Organisation UK and citing universal jurisdiction, issued arrest warrants against several officials in Myanmar, including Aung San Suu Kyi, on charges of "genocide and crimes against humanity" against the Rohingyas.

=== 1992: Menchú ===
The 1992 prize went to Rigoberta Menchú of Guatemala for "her work for social justice and ethno-cultural reconciliation based on respect for the rights of indigenous peoples". The prize was controversial because the prize-winner's memoirs, which had brought her to fame, turned out to be partly fictitious.

=== 1994: Arafat, Peres and Rabin ===
The 1994 prize went to Yasser Arafat, Shimon Peres, and Yitzhak Rabin "for their efforts to create peace in the Middle East". Kåre Kristiansen, a member of the Nobel Committee, resigned in protest at Arafat's award, citing his sponsorship of terrorism through the Palestine Liberation Organization (PLO) and calling him the "world's most prominent terrorist".

=== 2000: Kim ===
The 2000 prize went to Kim Dae-jung "for his work for democracy and human rights in South Korea and in East Asia in general, and for peace and reconciliation with North Korea in particular". Critics argued that Kim's 2000 inter-Korean summit was tainted by allegations that several hundred million dollars were paid to North Korea. His chief of staff, Park Jie-won, was initially sentenced to twelve years in prison in 2003 for, among other charges, his role in the payment to North Korea for the North–South summit, though he was later acquitted by the Supreme Court of Korea. In order to persuade North Korea to attend the summit, several "unconverted long-term prisoners" kept by South Korea were released and returned to North Korea.

=== 2002: Carter ===
The 2002 prize went to Jimmy Carter for "decades of untiring effort to find peaceful solutions to international conflicts, to advance democracy and human rights, and to promote economic and social development". The announcement of the award came shortly after the US House and Senate authorized President George W. Bush to use military force against Iraq in order to enforce UN Security Council resolutions requiring that Baghdad give up weapons of mass destruction. Asked if the selection of the former president was a criticism of Bush, Gunnar Berge, head of the Nobel Prize Committee, said, "With the position Carter has taken on this, it can and must also be seen as criticism of the line the current US administration has taken on Iraq." Carter declined to comment on the remark in interviews, saying that he preferred to focus on the work of the Carter Center.

=== 2004: Maathai ===
The 2004 prize went to Wangari Maathai "for her contribution to sustainable development, democracy and peace". Controversially, she was reported by the Kenyan newspaper The Standard and Radio Free Europe to have stated that HIV/AIDS was originally developed by Western scientists in order to depopulate Africa. She later denied these claims, although The Standard stood by its reporting. Additionally, in a Time magazine interview, she hinted that she believed HIV had a non-natural origin, saying that someone knows where it came from and that it "did not come from monkeys".

=== 2009: Obama ===
The 2009 prize went to U.S. president Barack Obama "for his extraordinary efforts to strengthen international diplomacy and cooperation between peoples". The award, given just nine months into Obama's first presidential term, received criticism that it was undeserved, premature, politically motivated, and wishful. Obama himself said that he felt "surprised" by the win and did not consider himself worthy of the award, but nonetheless accepted it. Obama's peace prize was called a "stunning surprise" by The New York Times. Much of the surprise arose from the fact that nominations for the award had been due by 1 February 2009, only 12 days after Obama took office. In an October 2011 interview, Thorbjørn Jagland, chairman of the Norwegian Nobel Committee, was asked whether Obama had lived up to the prize, and replied:

Yes, I think so. I'm as convinced as I was when he got it that he deserved it for many reasons. During three months' time, he ... paved the way for new negotiations with the Russian Federation about nuclear arms. If you look at the will of Alfred Nobel that goes directly to what he said that the prize should go to the person that has worked for—he called it reduction of standing armies but in today's terms it means arm control and disarmament. ... But, there are other things also, which we looked at, for instance, the fact that he started immediately to build bridges to the Muslim world throughout the time.

In 2015, Geir Lundestad, director of the Norwegian Nobel Institute (who sat in on the committee's meetings but did not have a vote), wrote in his memoir, Secretary of Peace, that he regretted giving the prize to Obama. The committee "thought it would strengthen Obama and it didn't have this effect", Lundestad told the Associated Press, though he fell short of calling the award a mistake. "In hindsight, we could say that the argument of giving Obama a helping hand was only partially correct", Lundestad wrote. Critics also argued that the award was a symbolic rejection of the George W. Bush Administration.

=== 2010: Liu ===
The 2010 prize went to Liu Xiaobo "for his long and non-violent struggle for fundamental human rights in China". Liu was imprisoned at the time of the award and neither he nor his family were allowed to attend the ceremony. The Chinese government alleged that Liu did not promote "international friendship, disarmament, and peace meetings", the prize's stated goal. The award led to a diplomatic dispute between Norway and China. Relations were normalized in December 2016.

=== 2012: European Union ===
The 2012 prize went to the European Union for "over six decades contributed to the advancement of peace and reconciliation, democracy and human rights in Europe". Among other objections, some former laureates disputed the award, claiming that the EU is "clearly not a champion of peace".

=== 2016: Santos ===
On 7 October 2016 the Nobel Peace Prize went to the president of Colombia, Juan Manuel Santos, for his efforts working with the Marxist–Leninist guerrilla group Revolutionary Armed Forces of Colombia (FARC) to bring the more than 50-year-long Colombian civil war to an end. The award has since been described as premature, as it was conferred five days after the nation narrowly rejected his peace plan in the 2016 Colombian peace agreement referendum. On 24 November 2016, the Colombian government and the FARC signed a revised peace deal, which the Colombian Congress approved on 30 November.

=== 2019: Abiy Ahmed ===
The 2019 Nobel Peace Prize was awarded to the prime minister of Ethiopia Abiy Ahmed "for his efforts to achieve peace and international cooperation, and in particular for his decisive initiative to resolve the border conflict with neighbouring Eritrea" as well as efforts to improve democracy and civil rights within Ethiopia. On November 3, 2020, the Tigray war broke out, which became the deadliest war of the 21st century with an estimated 600,000 to 800,000 people killed, and millions more displaced. All parties in the conflict were accused of systematic human rights violations and war crimes. The Ethiopian National Defence Force, and its allies Fano and the Eritrean Defence Forces were found to have engaged in indiscriminate bombardment of civilian areas, extrajudicial mass detention of civilians and killing of civilians, forced displacement of civilians, torture and rape. In 2022 the Nobel Committee issued a statement stating: "Since the autumn of 2020, tensions in Ethiopia have escalated into a large-scale armed conflict. The humanitarian situation is extremely serious, and it is unacceptable that large amounts of humanitarian aid are not reaching those in need. As Prime Minister and a winner of the Nobel Peace Prize, Abiy Ahmed has a special responsibility to end the conflict and help to create peace."

Relations between Ethiopia and Eritrea deteriorated in the years following the end of the Tigray war in 2022, particularly after a 2023 televised speech given to Ethiopian lawmakers by Ahmed in which he said that the Red Sea was Ethiopia's "natural boundary", and that access to the sea was "existential. He also reportedly said that "Ethiopia will secure direct access to a port – peacefully or, if necessary, by force." On 2 October 2026, Ethiopia and Eritrea severed diplomatic ties, over accusations that Eritrea was arming the Tigrayan People's Liberation Front. On 9 October 2026, conflict broke out between the countries when Eritrean troops entered Ethiopia's Tigray region, with Eritrea’s Minister of Information Yemane Gebremeskel saying "The Ethiopian regime has been pursuing, in effect, an unprovoked war of aggression against Eritrea for more than three years now".

Concerns have also been raised about political repression under Abiy Ahmed, particularly because of the widespread arrest of journalists and activists by the Ahmed regime, internet shutdowns and democratic backsliding. Abiy Ahmed is considered to be one of the most controversial Nobel laureates in history, with multiple mainstream news organisations criticizing the Nobel Committee for their award decision.

=== 2025: Machado ===
The 2025 prize was awarded to María Corina Machado "for her tireless work promoting democratic rights for the people of Venezuela and for her struggle to achieve a just and peaceful transition from dictatorship to democracy". Nicolás Maduro's government criticized the decision and announced the closure of its embassy in Oslo shortly after Machado's win. The Guardian noted that while Machado was popular in Venezuela, she was distrusted by some due to her support for foreign intervention in Venezuela and her support for U.S. president Donald Trump's disputed claim that the Venezuelan gang Tren de Aragua launched an "invasion" of the United States. Furthermore, the Muslim American civil rights group Council on American–Islamic Relations criticized what they described as a "unconscionable decision" in giving the Nobel Peace Prize to Machado due to her position on the Gaza war, while Norwegian lawmaker Bjørnar Moxnes argued that the award was not in line with Nobel's intentions, as Machado signed a cooperation agreement with Israel's Likud party in 2020.

Colombian president Gustavo Petro questioned the awarding of the Nobel to Machado, citing her past outreach to then Argentinian president Mauricio Macri and Israeli prime minister Benjamin Netanyahu in seeking support for her campaign to oust Maduro. Stefan Wolff, a professor of International Security at the University of Birmingham, argued that "Machado's efforts are laudable and she deserves praise for her personal courage standing up to Venezuela's strongman ruler, Nicolás Maduro. What is less apparent is how her selection fits with the award criteria as specified in Alfred Nobel's will. Nobel wanted the recipient to be 'the person who shall have done the most or the best work for fraternity between nations, the abolition or reduction of standing armies, and for the holding and promotion of peace congresses'. It's open to debate whether Machado fits those criteria." Also controversial according to Wolff was "the entire process surrounding the 2025 Nobel peace prize" for being "highly unusual, in the way it has involved very public lobbying for a particular candidate. Trump himself has used every conceivable opportunity to push for the award – even his speech before the UN general assembly on September 23, when he reiterated a claim he made on August 19 that he 'solved seven wars'."

In January 2026, following U.S. military actions that led to the removal of Nicolás Maduro, Machado met with Donald Trump at the White House and presented him with her physical Nobel Peace Prize medal as a "symbol of gratitude" for his "decisive action to secure a free Venezuela". The Norwegian Nobel Committee stated previously that "The Nobel Prize and the Laureate Are Inseparable", reiterating that while the medal can be disposed of freely, the prize honor itself "cannot be revoked, shared, or transferred" and remains permanently with Machado as the sole recorded laureate.

== Unrecognized peace advocates ==
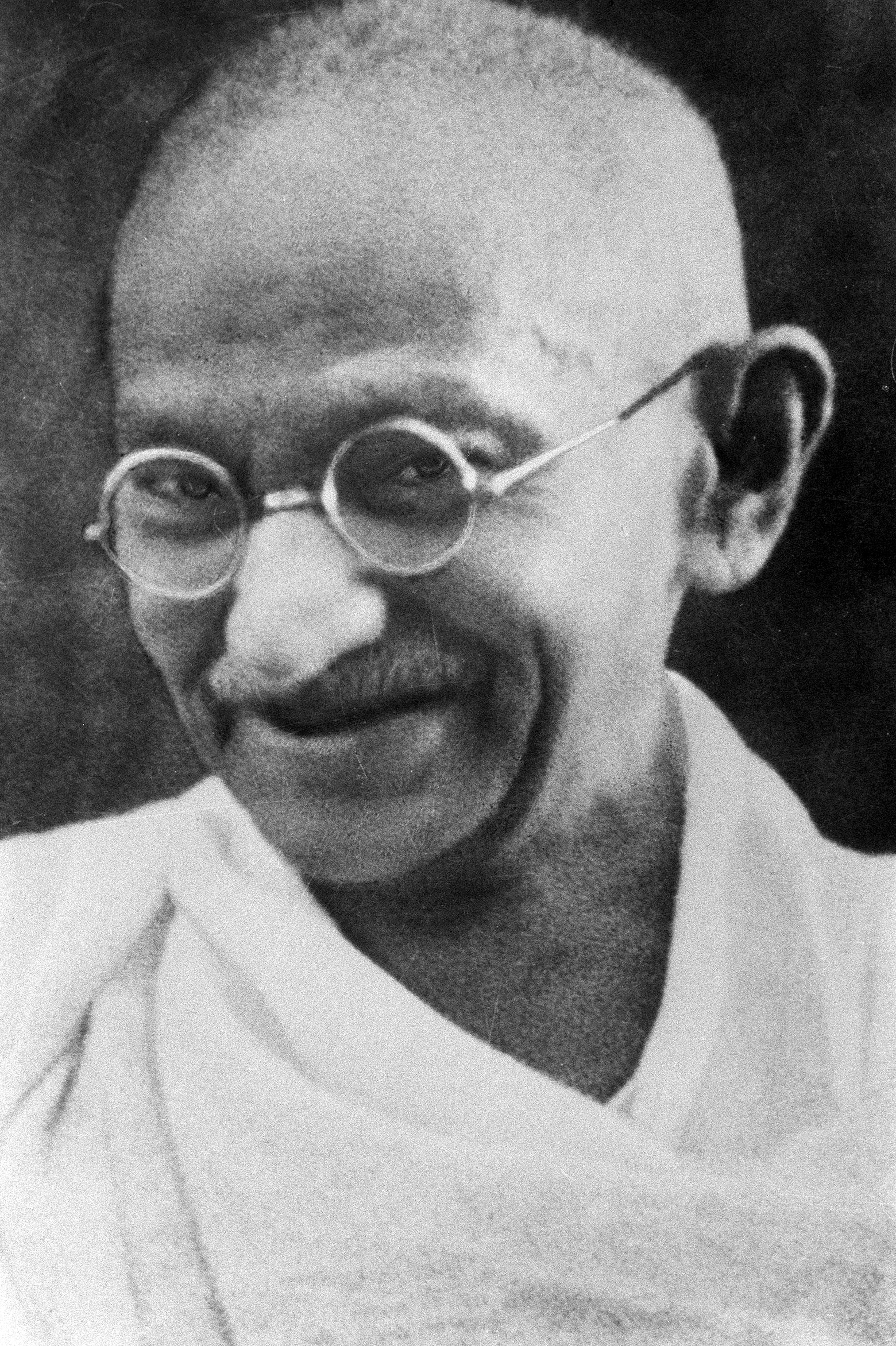
Mohandas Karamchand Gandhi (Mahatma Gandhi), "a role model for the generations to come" according to Albert Einstein, never won the Nobel Peace Prize despite five nominations.

In 2010, Foreign Policy noted people who had been overlooked for the Prize: Mohandas K. Gandhi, Eleanor Roosevelt, Václav Havel, Ken Saro-Wiwa, Sari Nusseibeh, Corazon Aquino and Liu Xiaobo (Liu would later win).

=== Gandhi ===
Mahatma Gandhi never received the Nobel Peace Prize, although between 1937 and 1948 he was nominated five times. In 1948, Gandhi received six letters of nomination and was on the shortlist for the Peace Prize but he was assassinated on 30 January 1948, two days before the closing date for nominations. The Nobel Committee decided against awarding the prize, saying the laureate could only be awarded posthumously if the laureate died after the committee's decision had been made. The Nobel Committee ultimately made no award in 1948, stating "there was no suitable living candidate". Decades later, a Nobel Committee publicly declared its regret for the omission. Geir Lundestad, Secretary of the Norwegian Nobel Committee in 2006, said, "The greatest omission in our 106-year history is undoubtedly that Mahatma Gandhi never received the Nobel Peace prize. Gandhi could do without the Nobel Peace prize, [but] whether Nobel committee can do without Gandhi is the question."

== Controversial nominations ==
In a submission not intended to be taken seriously, Erik Gottfrid Christian Brandt, an anti-fascist member of the Riksdag from the Swedish Social Democratic Party, nominated German dictator Adolf Hitler; the nomination was subsequently withdrawn on 1 February 1939, seven months before World War II began. No prize was awarded in 1939 to anyone for peace.

== See also ==
- Nobel Prize in Physics controversies
- Nobel Prize in Economics controversies
