= Antony Hewish =

British radio astronomer (1924–2021)

Antony Hewish FRS FInstP
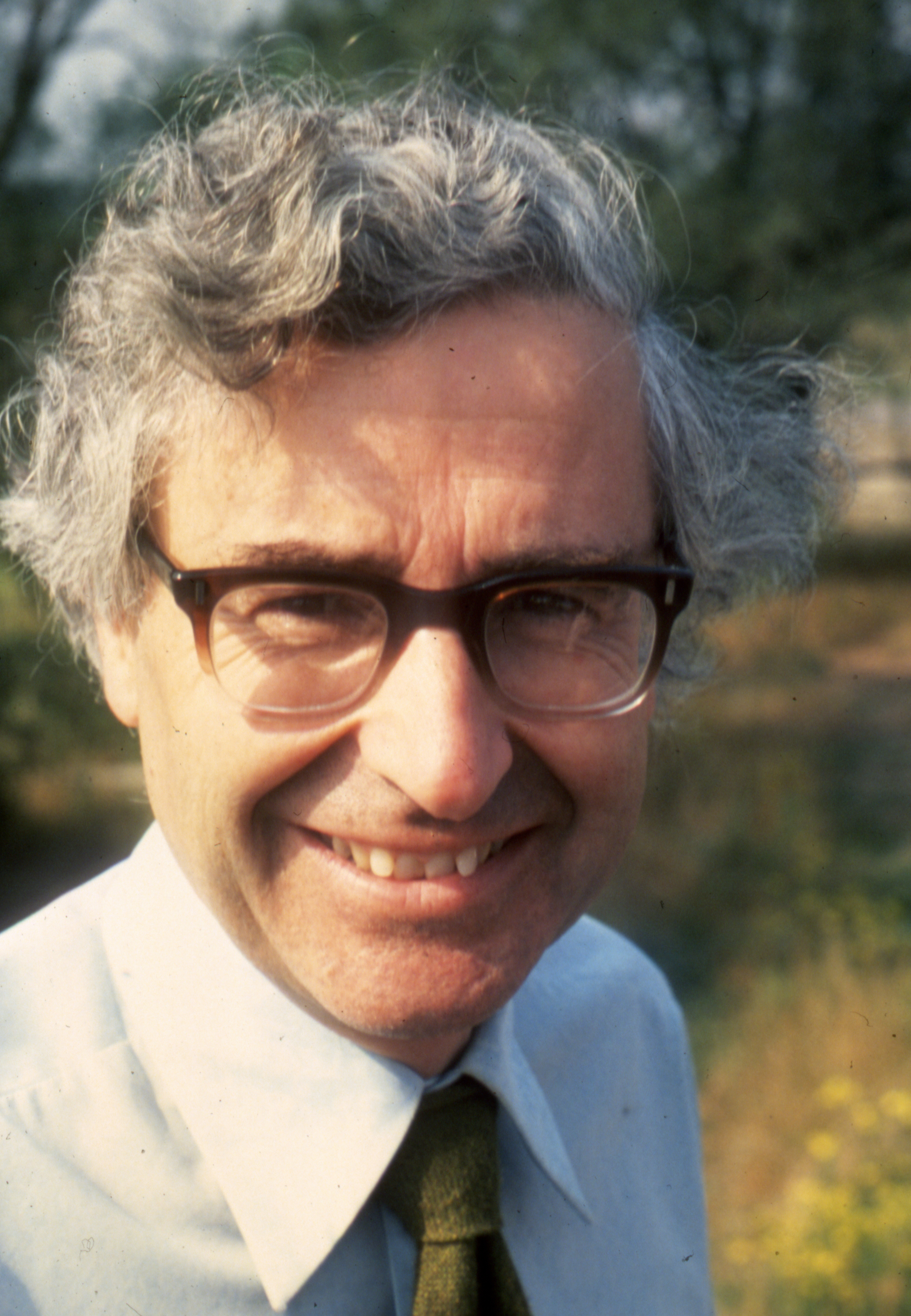
- Hewish in 1976
- Born: 11 May 1924; Fowey, Cornwall, England
- Died: 13 September 2021 (aged 97)
- Education: King's College, Taunton
- Alma mater: University of Cambridge (BA, PhD)
- Known for: Pulsars
- Spouse: Marjorie Richards (m. 1950)
- Awards: Hughes Medal (1977); Nobel Prize for Physics (1974); Eddington Medal (1969)
- Scientific career
- Fields: Radio astronomy
- Workplaces: Gonville and Caius College, Cambridge; Cavendish Laboratory
- Thesis: The fluctuations of galactic radio waves (1952)
- Doctoral students: Jocelyn Bell Burnell

Antony Hewish (11 May 1924 – 13 September 2021) was a British radio astronomer who won the Nobel Prize for Physics in 1974 (together with fellow radio-astronomer Martin Ryle) for his role in the discovery of pulsars. He was also awarded the Eddington Medal of the Royal Astronomical Society in 1969.

== Early life and education ==
Hewish attended King's College, Taunton. His undergraduate degree, at Gonville and Caius College, Cambridge, was interrupted by the Second World War. He was assigned to war service at the Royal Aircraft Establishment, and at the Telecommunications Research Establishment where he worked with Martin Ryle. Returning to the University of Cambridge in 1946, Hewish completed his undergraduate degree and became a postgraduate student in Ryle's research team at the Cavendish Laboratory. For his PhD thesis, awarded in 1952, Hewish made practical and theoretical advances in the observation and exploitation of the scintillations of astronomical radio sources, due to foreground plasma.

== Career and research ==
Hewish proposed the construction of a large phased array radio telescope, which could be used to perform a survey at high time resolution, primarily for studying interplanetary scintillation. In 1965 he secured funding to construct his design, the Interplanetary Scintillation Array, at the Mullard Radio Astronomy Observatory (MRAO) outside Cambridge. It was completed in 1967. One of Hewish's PhD students, Jocelyn Bell (later known as Jocelyn Bell Burnell), helped to build the array and was assigned to analyse its output. Bell soon discovered a radio source which was ultimately recognised as the first pulsar. Hewish initially thought that the signal might be radio frequency interference, but it remained at a constant right ascension, which is unlikely for a terrestrial source. The scientific paper announcing the discovery had five authors, Hewish's name being listed first, Bell's second.

Hewish and Ryle were awarded the Nobel Prize in Physics in 1974 for work on the development of radio aperture synthesis and for Hewish's decisive role in the discovery of pulsars. The exclusion of Bell from the Nobel prize was controversial (see Nobel Prize in Physics controversies). Fellow Cambridge astronomer Fred Hoyle argued that Bell should have received a share of the prize, although Bell herself stated "it would demean Nobel Prizes if they were awarded to research students, except in very exceptional cases, and I do not believe this is one of them". Michael Rowan-Robinson later wrote that "Hewish was undoubtedly the major player in the work that led to the discovery, inventing the scintillation technique in 1952, leading the team that built the array and made the discovery, and providing the interpretation".

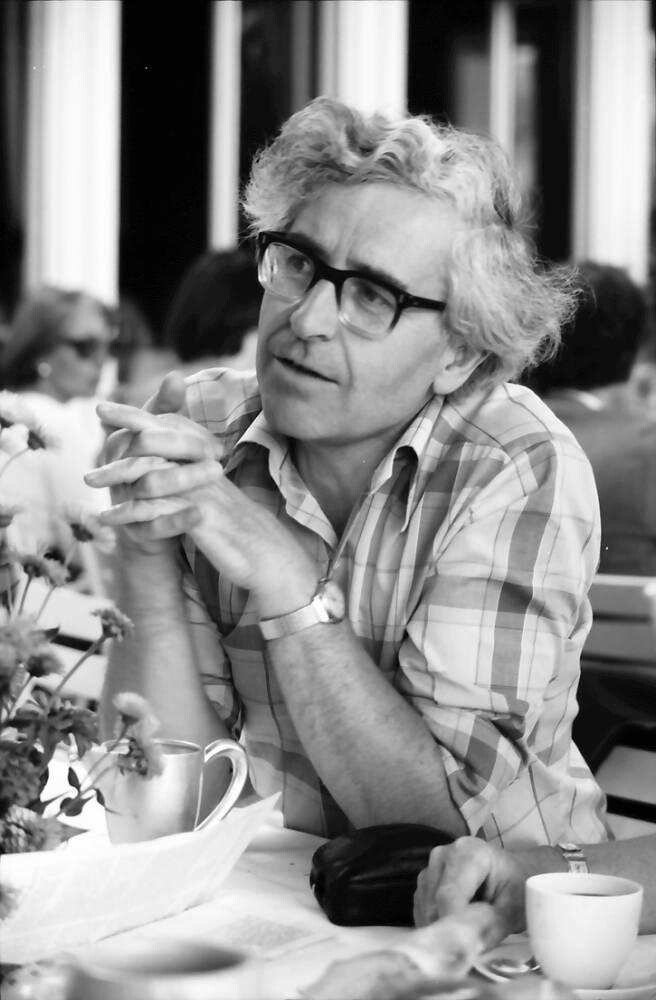
Hewish at a conference in 1976

Hewish was professor of radio astronomy in the Cavendish Laboratory from 1971 to 1989 and head of the MRAO from 1982 to 1988. He developed an association with the Royal Institution in London when it was directed by Sir Lawrence Bragg. In 1965 he was invited to co-deliver the Royal Institution Christmas Lecture on "Exploration of the Universe". He subsequently gave several Friday Evening Discourses and was made a Professor of the Royal Institution in 1977. Hewish was a fellow of Churchill College, Cambridge. He was also a member of the Advisory Council for the Campaign for Science and Engineering.

=== Awards and honours ===
Hewish had honorary degrees from six universities, including Manchester, Exeter and Cambridge, was a foreign member of the Belgian Royal Academy, American Academy of Arts and Sciences and the Indian National Science Academy. The National Portrait Gallery holds multiple portraits of him in its permanent collection. Other awards and honours include:

- Elected a Fellow of the Royal Society (FRS) in 1968
- Eddington Medal, Royal Astronomical Society (1969)
- Dellinger Gold Medal, International Union of Radio Science (1972)
- Albert A. Michelson Medal, Franklin Institute (1973, jointly with Jocelyn Bell Burnell)
- Fernand Holweck Medal and Prize (1974)
- Nobel Prize for Physics (jointly) (1974)
- Hughes Medal, Royal Society (1976)
- Elected a Fellow of the Institute of Physics (FInstP) in 1998

== Personal life ==
Hewish married Marjorie Elizabeth Catherine Richards in 1950. They had a son, a physicist, and a daughter, a language teacher. Hewish died on 13 September 2021, aged 97. Following his death, Hewish's Nobel Prize medal and other prizes were donated to Churchill College, Cambridge by his family.

=== Religious views ===
Hewish argued that religion and science are complementary. In the foreword to Questions of Truth, Hewish writes, "The ghostly presence of virtual particles defies rational common sense and is non-intuitive for those unacquainted with physics. Religious belief in God, and Christian belief ... may seem strange to common-sense thinking. But when the most elementary physical things behave in this way, we should be prepared to accept that the deepest aspects of our existence go beyond our common-sense understanding."
