= Nobel Prize in Physics controversies =

Controversies around the Nobel Prize in Physics

Nobel Prize in Physics
- Awarded for: Outstanding contributions to mankind in the field of physics
- Country: Sweden; Norway
- Presented by: Swedish Academy; Royal Swedish Academy of Sciences; Karolinska Institutet; Norwegian Nobel Committee
- First award: 1901; 125 years ago

Highlights
- Most awards: John Bardeen (2)
- Website: www.nobelprize.org/physics/

Since the first award in 1901, conferment of the Nobel Prizes, including the Nobel Prize in Physics, has engendered criticism and controversies. After his death in 1896, the will of Swedish industrialist Alfred Nobel established that an annual prize be awarded for service to humanity in the fields of physics, chemistry, physiology or medicine, literature, and peace. Similarly, the Sveriges Riksbank Prize in Economic Sciences in Memory of Alfred Nobel, first awarded in 1969, is awarded along with the Nobel Prizes.

Nobel sought to reward "those who, during the preceding year, shall have conferred the greatest benefit on mankind". One prize, he stated, should be given "to the person who shall have made the most important 'discovery' or 'invention' within the field of physics". Awards committees have historically rewarded discoveries over inventions: as of 2004, 77 percent of Nobel Prizes in Physics had given to discoveries, compared with only 23 percent to inventions.

A major controversy-generating factor for the more recent physics-related prizes is the Nobel rule that each award can not be shared by more than two different research areas and no more than three different individuals each year. This rule was adequate in 1901, when most of the science research was performed by individual scientists working with their small group of assistants in relative isolation. But in more recent times science research has increasingly become a matter of widespread international cooperation and exchange of ideas among different research groups. These groups are themselves composed of dozens or even hundreds of researchers - modern science has been described as "the teamiest of team sports". The three-person limit has led to glaring omissions of key participants in awarded research. As an example, the 2017 prize awarded for gravitational waves could not acknowledge the work of the huge LIGO consortium. Similarly, the 2013 prize for discovery of the Higgs boson did not reward the discovering ATLAS/CMS collaboration at CERN. The latter collaboration included a list of researchers filling 15 single-spaced pages.

The two area, three person limit, with no prizes to organizations, is not mentioned in Nobel's will, but was added by the award committee. The Nobel Peace Prize, for example, has long been granted to organizations as well as individuals. This would certainly have been appropriate in physics for cases such as ATLAS/CMS or LIGO.

== Controversies per year ==
=== 1923: Millikan ===
The 1923 prize went to Robert Millikan "for his work on the elementary charge of electricity and on the photoelectric effect". Millikan might have won in 1920 but for Felix Ehrenhaft's incorrect claim to have measured a smaller charge. Some controversy, however, still seems to linger over Millikan's oil drop experiment and experimental interpretation, over whether Millikan manipulated his data in the 1913 scientific paper measuring the electron charge. Allegedly, he did not report all his observations.

=== 1938: Fermi ===
The 1938 prize went to Enrico Fermi in part for "his demonstrations of the existence of new radioactive elements produced by neutron irradiation". His team's discovery of slow neutrons and different types of radioactivity were correct. But what he believed to be heavy transuranic elements created by neutron absorption of uranium (ausenium and hesperium) turned out to be something quite different. As part of replicating Fermi's experiments, Otto Hahn, Otto Robert Frisch, Lise Meitner, and Fritz Strassmann instead discovered, in late 1938, that Fermi had actually induced nuclear fission in the uranium, and that his identified "transuranics" turned out to be fission products, isotopes of much lighter elements than uranium. Fermi delivered his Nobel Prize lecture only a few weeks before this discovery; he added a footnote to the lecture afterwards, indicating that the discovery of fission products by Hahn et al., "makes it necessary to reexamine all the problems of the transuranic elements, as many of them might be found to be products of a splitting of uranium."

=== 1950: Powell ===
Another case of "scientific injustice" in the Nobel Prize in Physics is the exclusion of Brazilian physicist César Lattes from the 1950 prize, which was awarded solely to Cecil Frank Powell "for his development of the photographic method of studying nuclear processes and for the discoveries revealed by it with regard to cosmic rays and new particles". Lattes was a central member of Powell's group at the University of Bristol and played a decisive role in the discovery and characterization of the π meson (pion), a subatomic particle composed of a quark and an antiquark. He was also the principal researcher and first author of the landmark Nature paper describing the pion, but was excluded from the 1950 prize. The decision to award the prize only to Powell, and not to Lattes or other collaborators, has been interpreted as reflecting a tradition of the time in which the head of the group was the only name submitted for the Nobel, while younger members, even when essential experimentally, were systematically excluded.

There have been rumors that Niels Bohr left a letter entitled "Why César Lattes Did Not Win the Nobel Prize – Open 50 Years After My Death". However, during searches conducted at the Niels Bohr Institute in Copenhagen, Denmark, no such document was found.

=== 1974: Ryle and Hewish ===
The 1974 prize went to Martin Ryle and Antony Hewish "for their pioneering research in radio astrophysics: Ryle for his observations and inventions, in particular of the aperture synthesis technique, and Hewish for his decisive role in the discovery of pulsars". Jocelyn Bell Burnell, who first detected the signal from the first radio pulsar, was not included among the laureates. Hewish had initially mistaken Bell's findings as 'radio interference'. While Fred Hoyle argued that Bell should have been included in the prize, Bell said, "I believe it would demean Nobel Prizes if they were awarded to research students, except in very exceptional cases, and I do not believe this is one of them."

Over four decades later, Bell was recognized with a three million dollar Special Breakthrough Prize in Fundamental Physics of which she donated the entirety to assist female, minority, and refugee students in becoming physics researchers.

=== 1978: Penzias and Wilson ===
The 1978 prize was awarded for the chance "detection of cosmic microwave background radiation" by Bell Labs physicists Arno Allan Penzias and Robert Woodrow Wilson. There was some controversy over the award for a serendipitous discovery since it did not include Ralph Alpher and Robert Herman, who predicted the cosmic microwave background radiation in 1948, or Princeton physicist Robert Dicke who was also searching for the same phenomenon and co-published with Penzias and Wilson, explaining their results.

=== 1983: Chandrasekhar and Fowler ===
Half of the 1983 prize went to William Alfred Fowler "for his theoretical and experimental studies of the nuclear reactions of importance in the formation of the chemical elements in the universe". Fowler acknowledged Fred Hoyle as the pioneer of the concept of stellar nucleosynthesis but Hoyle did not receive a share in the prize. Hoyle's championing of many disreputable and disproven ideas may have damaged his overall reputation and invalidated him in the Nobel committee's view. Hoyle's obituary in Physics Today notes that "Many of us felt that Hoyle should have shared Fowler's 1983 Nobel Prize in Physics, but the Royal Swedish Academy of Sciences later made partial amends by awarding Hoyle, with Edwin Salpeter, its 1997 Crafoord Prize".

=== 1997: Chu, Cohen-Tannoudji and Philips ===
The 1997 prize went to Steven Chu, Claude Cohen-Tannoudji and William Daniel Phillips "for development of methods to cool and trap atoms with laser light". The award was disputed by Russian scientists who questioned the awardees' priority in the acquired approach and techniques, which the team of Vladimir Minogin and Victor Balykin claimed to have carried out more than a decade before.

=== 2005: Glauber ===
Half of the 2005 prize went to Roy J. Glauber "for his contribution to the quantum theory of optical coherence". Several physicists wrote to the Swedish Academy, protesting that Indian theoretical physicist E. C. George Sudarshan should have been awarded a share of the Prize for the Sudarshan diagonal representation (also known as Glauber–Sudarshan representation) in quantum optics, for which Glauber won his share of the prize. Sudarshan and other physicists sent a letter to the Nobel Committee claiming that the P representation had more contributions of "Sudarshan" than "Glauber".

=== 2008: Nambu, Kobayashi and Maskawa ===
Half of the 2008 prize went to Makoto Kobayashi and Toshihide Maskawa for their 1972 work on quark mixing. This postulated the existence of three additional quarks beyond the three then known to exist and used this postulate to provide a possible mechanism for CP violation, which had been observed 8 years earlier. Their work expanded and reinterpreted research by the Italian physicist Nicola Cabibbo, dating to 1963, before the quark model was even introduced. The resulting quark mixing matrix, which described probabilities of different quarks to turn into each other under the action of the weak force, is known as CKM matrix, after Cabibbo, Kobayashi, and Maskawa. Cabibbo arguably merited a share of the award. The recipient of the other half of the 2008 prize was Yoichiro Nambu for the discovery of the mechanism of spontaneous broken symmetry in subatomic physics. The fundamental step in this field is the Nambu–Jona-Lasinio model (NJL model), developed together with the Italian theoretical physicist Giovanni Jona-Lasinio, who was left out of the prize like Cabibbo. In recognition to his colleague's work, Nambu asked Jona-Lasinio to hold the Nobel Lecture at the Stockholm University in his place. As the prize is awarded each year to at most three people for no more than two different research works, the committee was forced to skip one member each from both the CKM and the NJL workgroups.

=== 2009: Kao, Boyle and Smith ===
The 2009 Nobel Prize in Physics was divided between three recipients over two disciplines, fiber optics and charge-coupled devices. Combined with the limit of three awardees, this led to some omissions. Charles Kuen Kao's award for his work in fiber optics led to claims that Narinder Singh Kapany's previous work had been overlooked.

The second award topic was "for the invention of an imaging semiconductor circuit—the CCD sensor". The awardees, Willard Boyle and George E. Smith, developed the CCD, but for use as a memory. This led to Eugene I. Gordon and Michael Francis Tompsett claiming that it should have been theirs for establishing that the technology could be used for imaging, especially as "imaging" is part of the award description.

=== 2010: Geim and Novoselov ===
The 2010 Nobel Prize in Physics was awarded to Andre Geim and Konstantin Novoselov of the University of Manchester "for groundbreaking experiments regarding the two-dimensional material graphene". Several problems with the factual accuracy of the supporting documents issued by the Nobel committee have been pointed out, including that they seem to wrongly attribute the discovery of graphene to Geim and Novoselov, and they did not take into account other contributions to graphene research, like those from Walter de Heer and Philip Kim.

=== 2013: Higgs and Englert ===
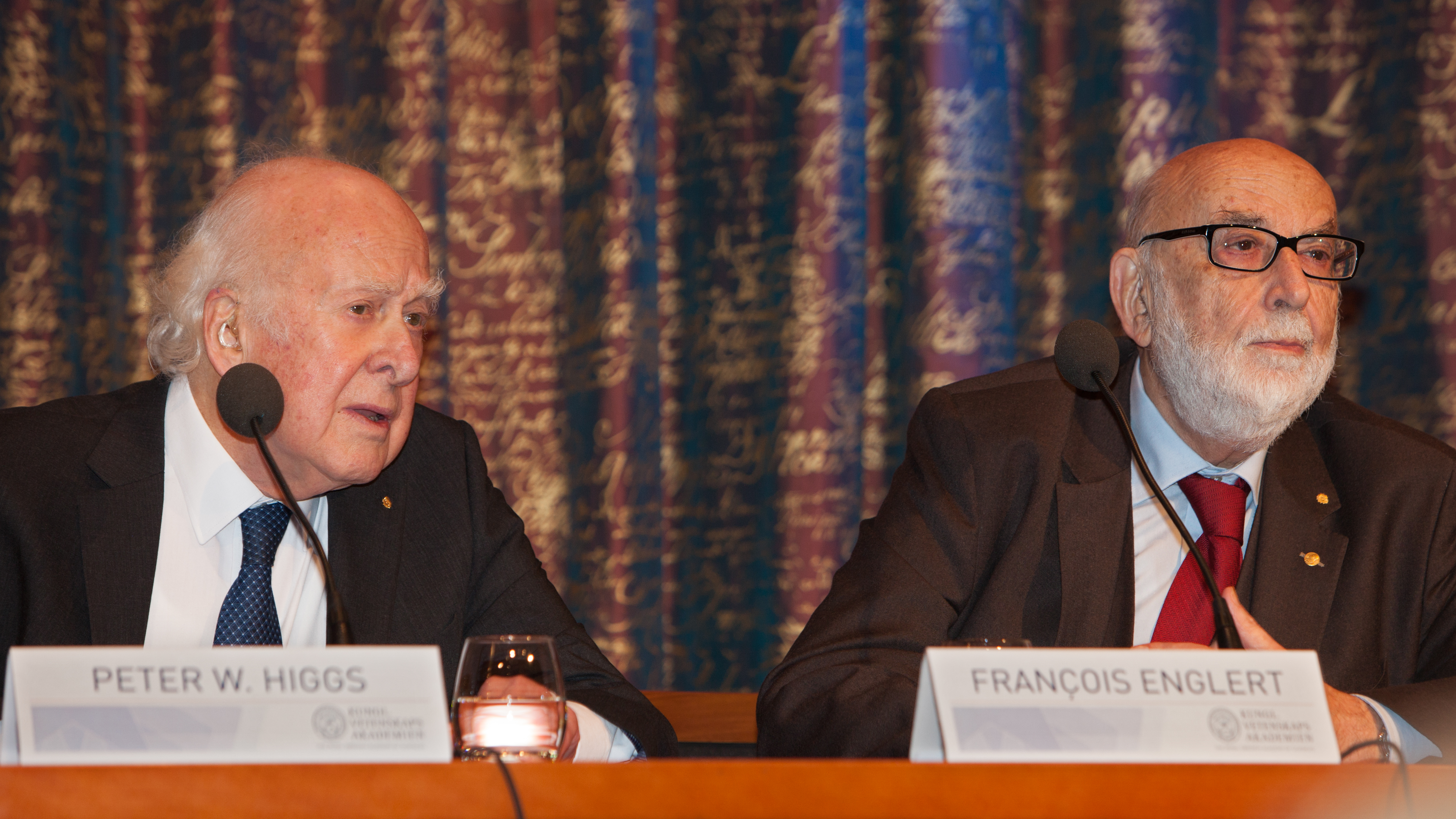
Peter Higgs and François Englert during 2013 Nobel Prize press conference

Peter Higgs and François Englert were awarded the 2013 Nobel Prize in Physics for their theoretical predictions related to the Higgs boson. This ran into the problem of the Nobel only awarding three individuals since three separate 1964 PRL symmetry breaking papers have been credited with the discovery of the Higgs mechanism and Higgs boson. These PRL papers were written by 1) Robert Brout and François Englert, 2) Peter Higgs, and 3) Gerald Guralnik, C. Richard Hagen, and Tom Kibble. Brout died a few years earlier and was not included. There was debate over whether Guralnik/Hagen/Kibble should have been included in the Nobel Prize for their 1964 PRL symmetry breaking papers. CERN, whose experiments proved the existence of the Higgs boson, was also excluded from the 2013 Prize.

=== 2014: Akasaki, Amano and Nakamura ===
The 2014 Nobel Prize in Physics, awarded to Isamu Akasaki, Hiroshi Amano and Shuji Nakamura for the blue light-emitting diode, did not recognize the decades of incremental work in developing the LED by other pioneers such as Oleg Losev, Nick Holonyak, and Gertrude Neumark and overlooked a prior claim for invention of the blue LED by RCA materials researcher Herbert Paul Maruska.

=== 2017: Weiss, Thorne and Barish ===
The 2017 Nobel Prize in Physics was awarded to Reiner Weiss, Kip Thorne, and Barry Barish for their contribution to LIGO, which led to the detection of gravitational waves. Despite the contributions of the upwards of a thousand scientists and engineers in LIGO, the Nobel Committee continued its tradition of awarding the prize to only three physicists. All three winners commented saying that the prize belongs to the entire LIGO Scientific Collaboration (LSC). Thorne said "It is unfortunate that, due to the statutes of the Nobel Foundation, the prize has to go to no more than three people, when our marvelous discovery is the work of more than a thousand." Further controversy was narrowly avoided by the death of Ronald Drever, who if still alive would have forced the committee to choose three of the four main contributors.

=== 2024: Hopfield and Hinton ===
The 2024 Nobel Prize in Physics was awarded to John Hopfield and Geoffrey Hinton for their work on neural networks. The announcement sparked debates between physicists in social media about whether the laureates' work on artificial intelligence belonged to physics or not. It has also been argued that Japanese pioneers in artificial intelligence like Shun'ichi Amari, who developed an algorithm equivalent to that of Hopfield networks prior to Hopfield and anticipated Hinton's backpropagation algorithm, were excluded from the prize.

== Other major unrecognized discoveries ==
=== Nuclear fission ===
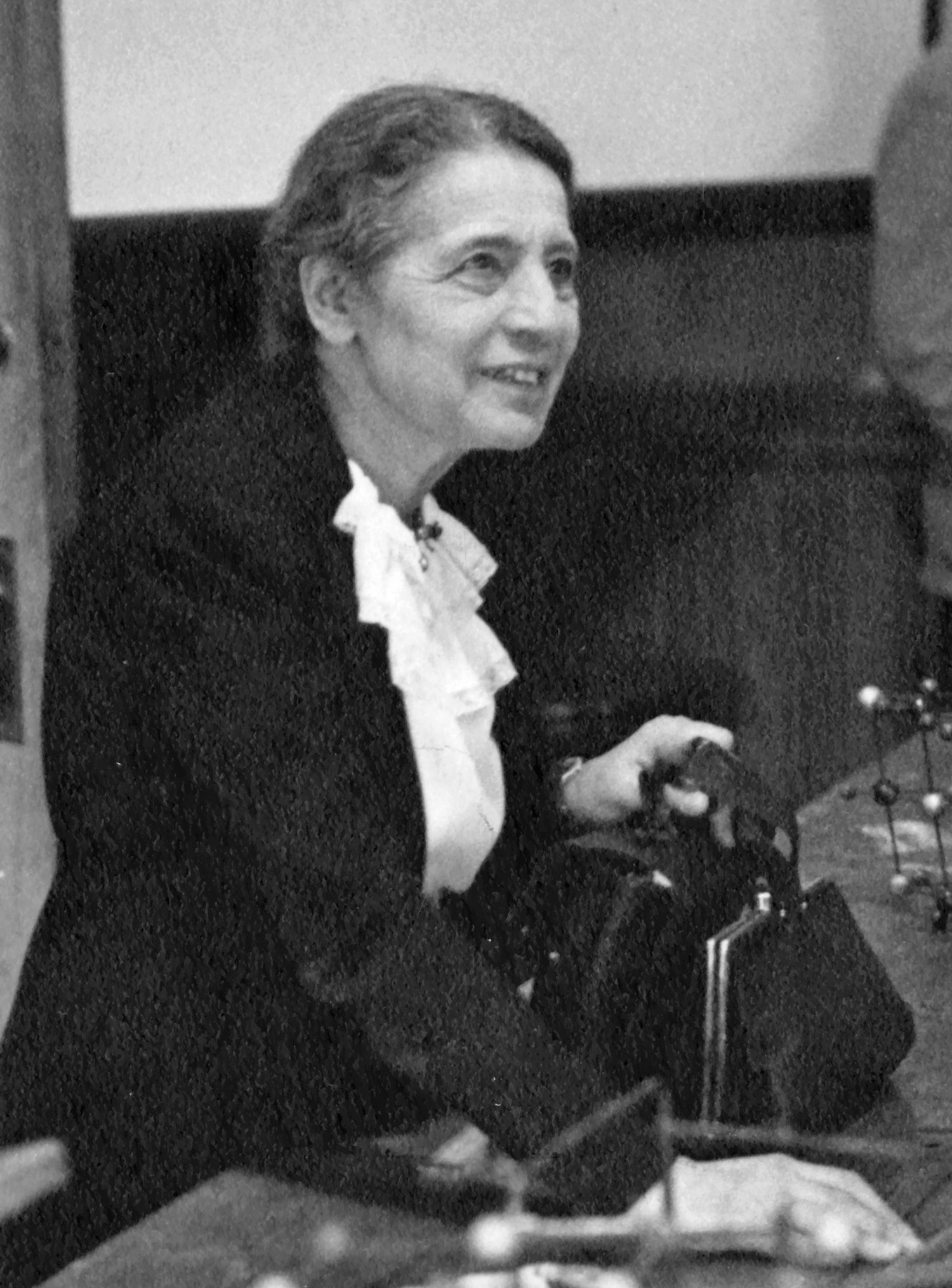
Lise Meitner who discovered nuclear fission with Otto Hahn. Hahn received the Nobel Prize in Chemistry, Meitner never received a Nobel Prize.

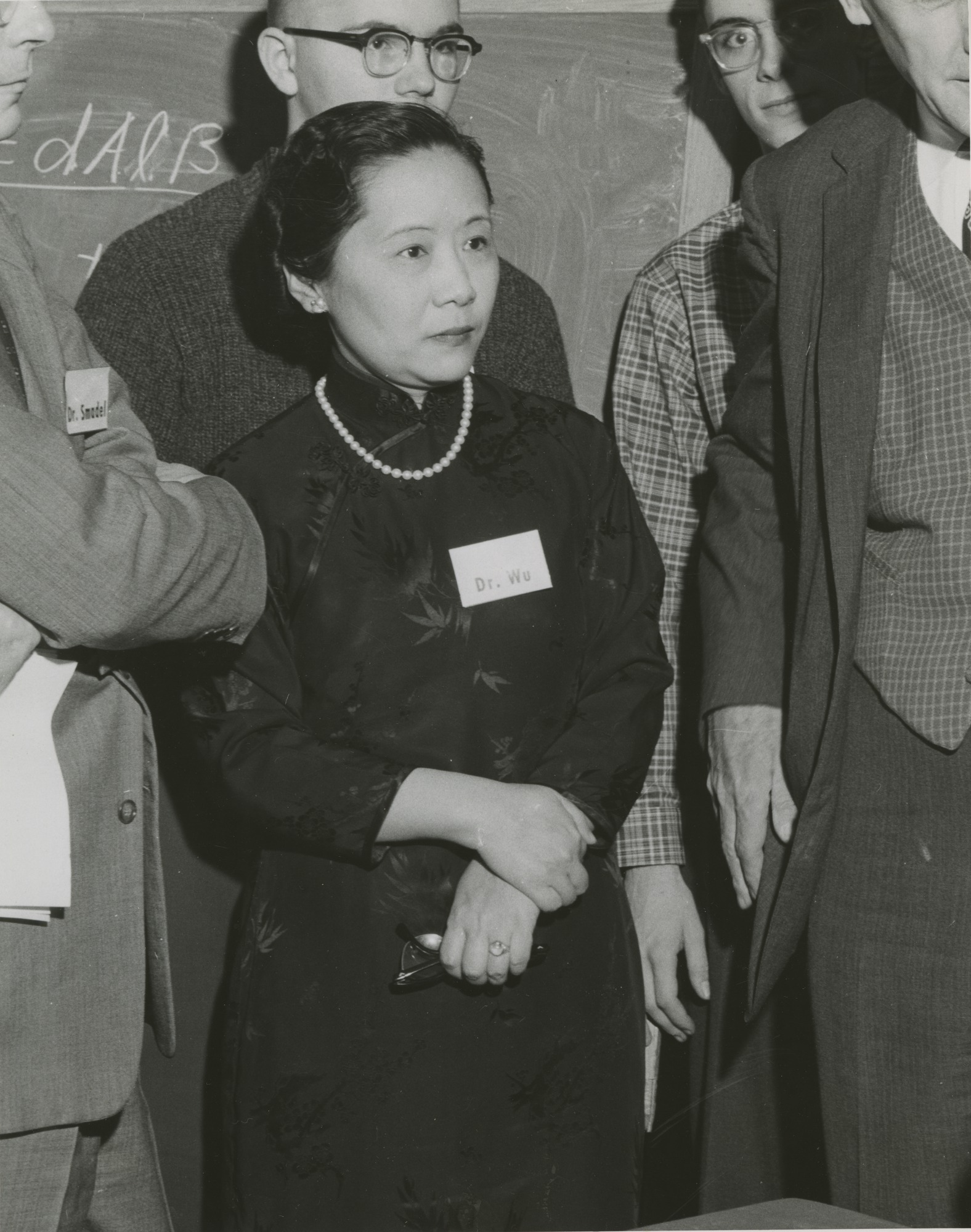
Chien-Shiung Wu, known for the 1956 Wu experiment that demonstrated parity violations in physics, never received a Nobel Prize

None of the contributors to the discovery of nuclear fission won the prize for Physics. Instead, the prize for Chemistry was awarded to Otto Hahn for his discovery of fission in Berlin in 1938. Lise Meitner also contributed to the discovery of nuclear fission, through her collaboration with Hahn. From the beginning, she had worked with Hahn on the neutron bombardment of uranium, but left Germany for Sweden before fission was discovered. Working there with the experimental data supplied to her by Hahn, she managed, with Otto Robert Frisch's participation, to incorporate Niels Bohr's liquid drop model (first suggested by George Gamow) into fission's theoretical foundation. In an earlier collaboration with Hahn, she had independently discovered a new chemical element (called protactinium). Bohr nominated both for this work, in addition to recommending the Chemistry prize for Hahn. Hahn's assistant, Fritz Strassmann, was not considered for the Physics prize.

=== Violation of the conservation of parity ===
Chien-Shiung Wu disproved the law of the conservation of parity (1956) with the so called Wu experiment, becoming the first Wolf Prize in Physics laureate. She died in 1997 without receiving a Nobel. Wu assisted Tsung-Dao Lee personally in his parity laws development—with Chen-Ning Yang—by providing him in 1956 with a possible test method for beta decay that worked successfully. Her book Beta Decay (1965) is still a sine qua non reference for nuclear physicists.

=== Sommerfeld's contributions ===
Arnold Sommerfeld was nominated for the Nobel Prize 84 times, more than any other physicist (including Otto Stern, who got nominated 82 times), but he never received the award.

=== Bose–Einstein statistics ===
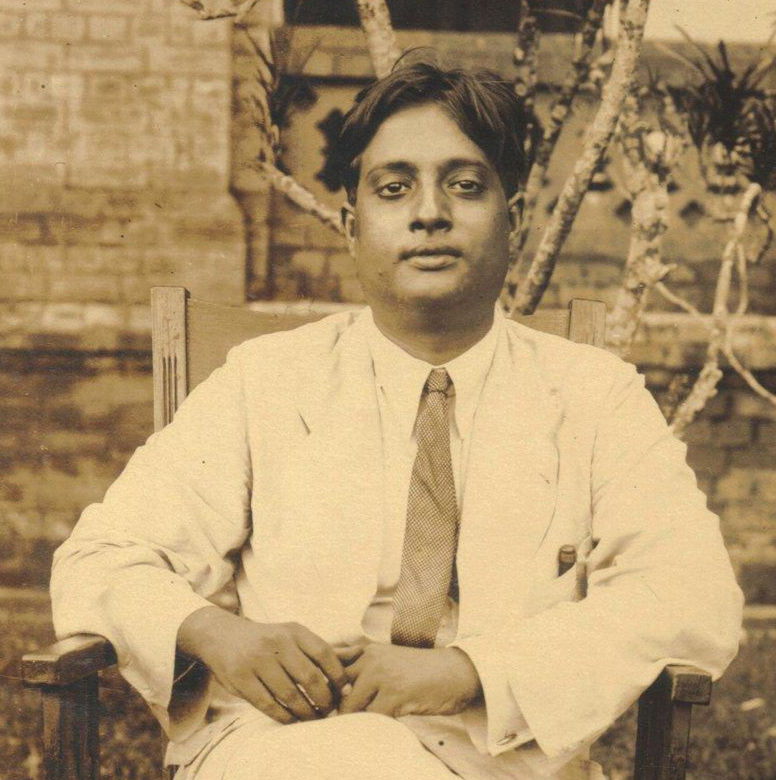
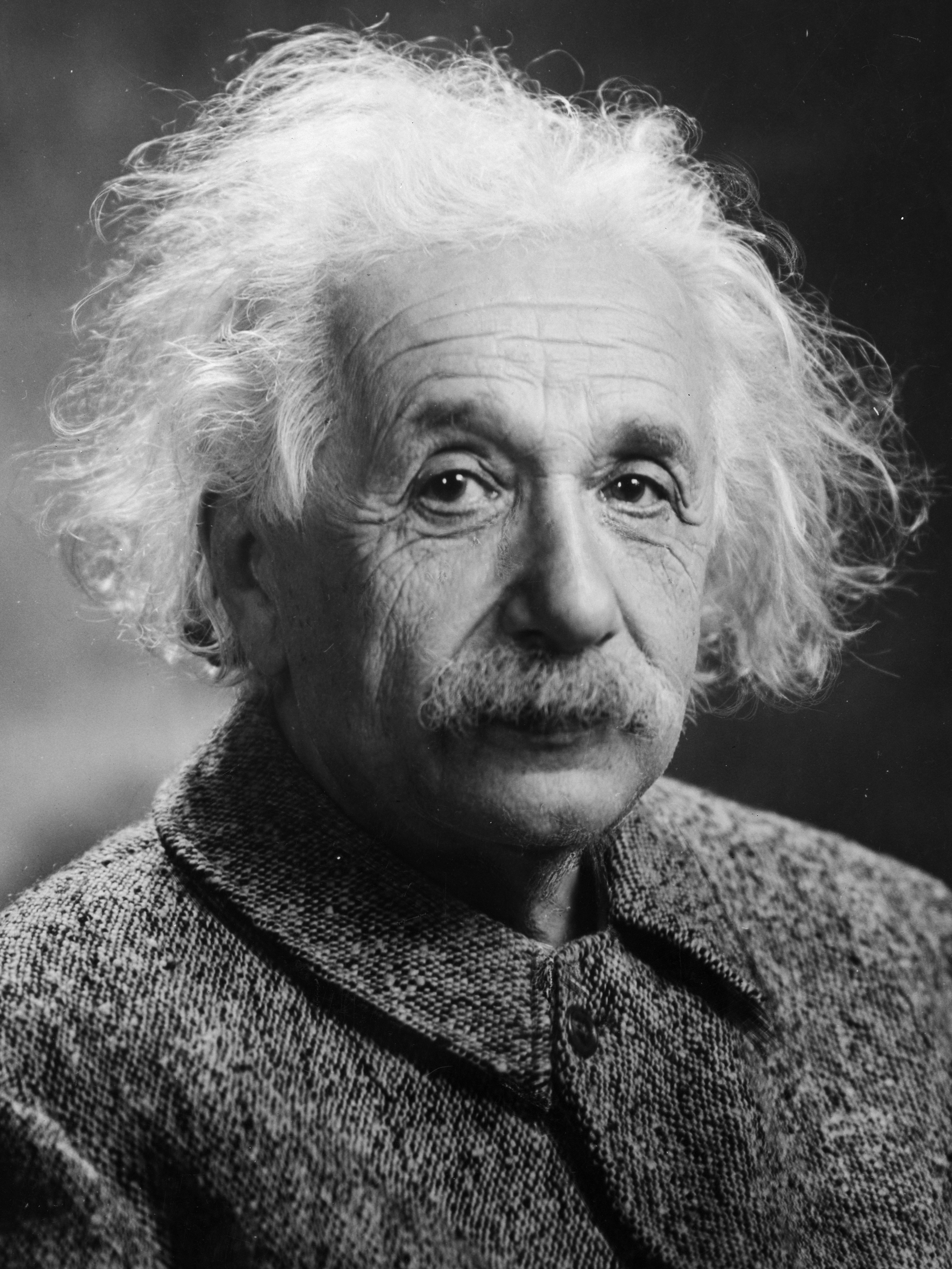
Satyendra Nath Bose (left) and Albert Einstein (right) discovered Bose–Einstein statistics. Bose never received a Nobel Prize. Einstein awarded a single 1921 prize out of numerous nominations.

Several Nobel Prizes were awarded for research related to the concepts of the boson, Bose–Einstein statistics and Bose–Einstein condensate—the latest being the 2001 Nobel Prize in Physics given for advancing the theory of Bose–Einstein condensates although Satyendra Nath Bose himself was not awarded the Nobel Prize. In his book The Scientific Edge, physicist Jayant Narlikar observed: "SN Bose's work on particle statistics (c.1922), which clarified the behavior of photons (the particles of light in an enclosure) and opened the door to new ideas on statistics of Microsystems that obey the rules of quantum theory, was one of the top ten achievements of 20th century Indian science and could be considered in the Nobel Prize class." The work of other 20th century Indian scientists which Narlikar considered to be of Nobel Prize class were Srinivasa Ramanujan, Chandrasekhara Venkata Raman and Meghnad Saha. However, when asked about the omission, Bose himself said: "I have got all the recognition I deserve." Rolf-Dieter Heuer, the director general of European organization for nuclear research CERN, commented in a scientific meet in Kolkata titled Frontiers of Science that "it is unfortunate that pioneering Indian physicist Satyendra Nath Bose did not win the Nobel Prize for work on quantum physics in the 1920s that provided the foundation of the Bose–Einstein statistics and the theory of the Bose–Einstein condensate".

=== Einstein's annus mirabilis ===
Albert Einstein's 1921 Nobel Prize Award mainly recognized his 1905 discovery of the mechanism of the photoelectric effect and "for his services to Theoretical Physics". The Nobel committee passed on several nominations for his many other seminal contributions, although these led to prizes for others who later applied more advanced technology to experimentally verify his work, most notably the 2017 prize awarded to the heads of LIGO. Many predictions of Einstein's theories have been verified as technology has advanced. Recent examples include the bending of light in a gravitational field, gravitational waves (detected by LIGO), gravitational lensing and black holes. It was not until 1993 that the first evidence for the existence of gravitational radiation came via the Nobel Prize-winning measurements of the Hulse–Taylor binary system.

The committee also failed to recognize the other contributions of his annus mirabilis papers on Brownian motion and special relativity. Often these nominations for special relativity were for both Hendrik Lorentz and Einstein. Henri Poincaré was also nominated at least once for his work, including on Lorentz's relativity theory. However, Walter Kaufmann's then-experimental results (incorrectly) cast doubt on special relativity. These doubts were not resolved until 1915. By this time, Einstein had progressed to his general theory of relativity, including his theory of gravitation. Empirical support—in this case the predicted spectral shift of sunlight—was in question for many decades. The only piece of original evidence was the consistency with the known perihelion precession of the planet Mercury. Some additional support was gained at the end of 1919, when the predicted deflection of starlight near the Sun was confirmed by Arthur Eddington's solar eclipse expedition, though here again the actual results were somewhat ambiguous. Conclusive proof of the gravitational light deflection prediction was not achieved until the 1970s.

== Mistakes in the award notification ==
- 1989: The Nobel Committee mistakenly phoned Washington DC economist Norman Ramsey, trying to award him the Nobel Prize in Physics. They meant to call the Harvard University physicist Norman Foster Ramsey Jr..

== See also ==
- Nobel Peace Prize controversies
- Nobel Economics Prize controversies
- Nobel Prize in Literature controversies
- Nobel Chemistry Prize controversies
- Nobel Physiology or Medicine Prize controversies
