= Erik Gottfrid Christian Brandt =

Swedish politician (1884–1955)

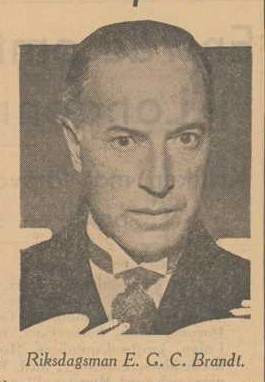
Erik Gottfrid Christian Brandt (1939)

Erik Gottfrid Christian Brandt, called Brandt i Söderby in Parliament, (31 August 1884 – 22 October 1955) was a Swedish politician (Social Democratic) and a deputy in the Riksdag (parliament) from 1938 to 1943.

== Biography ==
Brandt was born in Borrby, Kristianstad County, and came from a southern Swedish pastor's family. After studying at Lund University in 1911, he became a schoolteacher in Luleå. From 1915, he served as inspector of schools in the province of Dalarna. In 1938, he was elected as a substitute to the Första kammare (upper house) of the Riksdag, but was able to assume membership after the deaths of Smedh and Ivar Englund and the resignation of Gunnar Myrdal. He held the role until 1943.

Brandt is best known for his failed nomination of Adolf Hitler for the Nobel Peace Prize on the eve of World War II. The nomination was quickly withdrawn as Brandt, who was an antifascist, never intended for it to be a serious proposal and instead saw it only as a "satiric criticism" on another concurrent nomination, namely that of British Prime Minister Neville Chamberlain. Brandt firmly opposed Nazi Germany's policies during World War II.

To the Norwegian Nobel Committee

I hereby humbly suggest that the Peace Prize for 1939 is awarded the German Chancellor and Führer Adolf Hitler, a man, who in the opinion of millions of people, is a man who more than anyone in the world has deserved this highly respected reward. Authentic documents reveal that in September 1938 world peace was in great danger; it was only a matter of hours before a new European war could break out. The man who during this dangerous time saved our part of the world from this terrible catastrophe was without no doubt the great leader of the German people. In the critical moment he voluntarily did not let weapons speak although he had the power to start a world war.

By his glowing love for peace, earlier documented in his famous book Mein Kampf – next to the Bible perhaps the best and most popular piece of literature in the world - together with his peaceful achievement – the annexation of Austria-Adolf Hitler has avoided the use of force by freeing his countrymen in Sudetenland and making his fatherland big and powerful. Probably Hitler will, if unmolested and left in peace by war mongers, pacify Europe and possibly the whole world.

Sadly there still are a great number of people who fail to see the greatness in Adolf Hitler´s struggle for peace. Based on this fact I would not have found the time right to nominate Hitler as a candidate to the Nobel Peace Prize had it not been for a number of Swedish parliamentarians who have nominated another candidate, namely the British Prime Minister Neville Chamberlain. This nomination seems to be poorly thought. Although it is true that Chamberlain through his generous understanding of Hitler´s struggle for pacification has contributed to the saving of world peace, the last decision was Hitler´s and not Chamberlains! Hitler and no one else is first and foremost to be thanked for the peace which still prevails in the greater part of Europe; and this man is also the hope for peace in the future.

As Chamberlains obviously can claim his share of the peace making, he could possibly have a smaller part of the Peace Prize. But the most correct thing to do is not to put another name beside the name of Adolf Hitler and thereby throwing a shadow on him. Adolf Hitler is by all means the authentic God-given fighter for peace, and millions of people all over the world put their hopes in him as the Prince of Peace on earth.

Stockholm, January 27, 1939

Brandt died in Stora Tuna parish, Kopparberg County, in 1955.
